= List of moths of North America (MONA 001–854.1) =

North American moths represent about 12,000 types of moths. In comparison, there are about 825 species of North American butterflies. The moths (mostly nocturnal) and butterflies (mostly diurnal) together make up the taxonomic order Lepidoptera.

This list is sorted by MONA number (MONA is short for Moths of America North of Mexico). A numbering system for North American moths introduced by Ronald W. Hodges, et al. in 1983 in the publication Check List of the Lepidoptera of America North of Mexico. The list has since been updated, but the placement in families is outdated for some species.

This list covers America north of Mexico (effectively the continental United States and Canada). For a list of moths and butterflies recorded from the state of Hawaii, see List of Lepidoptera of Hawaii.

This is a partial list, covering moths with MONA numbers ranging from 0001 to 854.1. For the rest of the list, see List of moths of North America.

== Micropterigidae ==
- 0001 – Epimartyria auricrinella, goldcap moss-eater moth
- 0002 – Epimartyria pardella
- no number yet – Epimartyria bimaculella

== Eriocraniidae ==
- 0003 – Dyseriocrania griseocapitella, chinquapin leaf-miner moth
- 0004 – Dyseriocrania auricyanea
- 0005 – Eriocrania semipurpurella, purplish birch-miner moth
- 0006 – Eriocrania breviapex
- 0007 – Eriocraniella aurosparsella
- 0008 – Eriocraniella xanthocara
- 0009 – Eriocraniella longifurcula
- 0010 – Eriocraniella platyptera
- 0011 – Eriocraniella variegata
- 0012 – Eriocraniella trigona
- 0013 – Eriocraniella falcata
- 0013.1 – Eriocraniella mediabulla
- 0014 – Neocrania bifasciata

== Acanthopteroctetidae ==
- 0015 – Acanthopteroctetes tripunctata
- 0016 – Acanthopteroctetes bimaculata
- 0017 – Acanthopteroctetes unifascia
- 0017.1 – Acanthopteroctetes aurulenta

== Hepialidae ==
- 0018 – Sthenopis argenteomaculatus, silver-spotted ghost moth
- 0019 – Sthenopis purpurascens, four-spotted ghost moth
- 0021 – Sthenopis thule, willow ghost moth
- 0022 – Sthenopis auratus, gold-spotted ghost moth
- 0023 – Gazoryctra hyperboreus
- 0023.1 – Gazoryctra sciophanes
- 0024 – Gazoryctra confusus
- 0025 – Gazoryctra roseicaput
- 0026 – Gazoryctra pulcher
- 0027 – Gazoryctra mcglashani
- 0028 – Gazoryctra mathewi, Matthew's ghost moth
- 0029 – Gazoryctra novigannus
- 0029.1 – Gazoryctra wielgusi
- 0031 – Korscheltellus gracilis, conifer swift moth
- 0031.1 – Korscheltellus lupulina, common swift moth
- 0032 – Gazoryctra lembertii
- 0033 – Phymatopus behrensi
- 0035 – Phymatopus californicus, lupine ghost moths
- 0036 – Phymatopus hectoides

== Nepticulidae ==
- 0037 – Ectoedemia ochrefasciella, hard maple budminer moth
- 0038 – Ectoedemia sericopeza, Norway maple seedminer
- 0039 – Ectoedemia argyropeza
- 0040 – Ectoedemia canutus, balsam poplar petiole miner
- 0041 – Ectoedemia trinotata
- 0042 – Ectoedemia marmaropa
- 0043 – Ectoedemia platanella, sycamore leaf blotch miner
- 0044 – Ectoedemia clemensella
- 0045 – Ectoedemia similella
- 0046 – Ectoedemia virgulae
- 0047 – Ectoedemia lindquisti, small birch leafminer moth
- 0048 – Ectoedemia rubifoliella
- 0049 – Ectoedemia ulmella
- 0049.1 – Ectoedemia andrella
- 0050 – Ectoedemia nyssaefoliella
- 0051 – Ectoedemia quadrinotata
- 0052 – Ectoedemia populella, aspen petiole gall moth
- 0053 – Ectoedemia obrutella
- 0053.1 – Ectoedemia acanthella
- 0053.2 – Ectoedemia piperella
- 0054 – Ectoedemia chlorantis
- 0055 – Ectoedemia heinrichi
- 0056 – Ectoedemia castaneae
- 0057 – Ectoedemia phleophaga
- 0058 – Ectoedemia mesoloba
- 0058.1 – Ectoedemia reneella
- 0058.2 – Ectoedemia helenella
- 0059 – Trifurcula saccharella
- 0060 – Ectoedemia pteliaeella
- 0061 – Ectoedemia hypericella
- 0062 – Stigmella crataegifoliella
- 0063 – Stigmella scintillans
- 0064 – Stigmella pomivorella
- 0065 – Stigmella chalybeia
- 0066 – Stigmella scinanella
- 0067 – Stigmella purpuratella
- 0068 – Stigmella stigmaciella
- 0069 – Stigmella taeniola
- 0070 – Stigmella prunifoliella
- 0071 – Stigmella ceanothi
- 0072 – Stigmella intermedia
- 0073 – Stigmella rhoifoliella
- 0074 – Stigmella rhamnicola
- 0075 – Stigmella diffasciae
- 0076 – Stigmella gossypii, cotton leafminer moth
- 0076.1 – Stigmella inconspicuella
- 0076.2 – Stigmella heteromelis
- 0077 – Stigmella cerea
- 0078 – Stigmella rosaefoliella
- 0079 – Stigmella slingerlandella
- 0080 – Stigmella villosella
- 0081 – Stigmella apicialbella
- 0082 – Stigmella fuscotibiella
- 0083 – Ectoedemia canadensis
- 0084 – Stigmella populetorum
- 0085 – Stigmella aromella
- 0086 – Stigmella pallida
- 0087 – Stigmella saginella
- 0088 – Stigmella macrocarpae
- 0089 – Stigmella nigriverticella
- 0090 – Stigmella castaneaefoliella
- 0091 – Stigmella flavipedella
- 0091.1 – Stigmella sclerostyla
- 0092 – Stigmella corylifoliella
- 0093 – Stigmella ostryaefoliella
- 0094 – Stigmella myricafoliella
- 0095 – Stigmella juglandifoliella, pecan serpentine leafminer moth
- 0095.1 – Stigmella longisacca
- 0096 – Stigmella unifasciella
- 0097 – Stigmella condaliafoliella
- 0098 – Stigmella tiliella
- 0099 – Stigmella quercipulchella
- 0100 – Stigmella variella
- 0101 – Stigmella altella
- 0102 – Stigmella procrastinella
- 0103 – Stigmella alba
- 0104 – Stigmella braunella
- 0105 – Stigmella argentifasciella
- 0105.1 – Stigmella plumosetaeella
- 0106 – Stigmella amelanchierella
- 0107 – Ectoedemia anguinella
- 0108 – Stigmella belfrageella
- 0109 – Ectoedemia grandisella
- 0109.1 – Ectoedemia coruscella
- 0109.2 – Ectoedemia reneella
- 0109.3 – Ectoedemia weaveri
- 0110 – Ectoedemia platea
- 0111 – Stigmella resplendensella
- 0112 – Acalyptris thoracealbella
- 0112.1 – Acalyptris bipinnatellus
- 0113 – Acalyptris bicornutus
- 0114 – Acalyptris punctulata
- 0114.1 – Acalyptris lotella
- 0114.2 – Acalyptris postalatratus
- 0114.3 – Acalyptris distaleus
- 0115 – Acalyptris tenuijuxtus
- 0116 – Acalyptris scirpi
- 0117 – Enteucha basidactyla
- 0118 – Enteucha gilvafascia

== Opostegidae ==
- 0119 – Pseudopostega cretea
- 0119.1 – Pseudopostega floridensis
- 0119.2 – Pseudopostega parakempella
- 0119.3 – Pseudopostega acidata
- 0119.4 – Pseudopostega texana
- 0119.5 – Pseudopostega venticola
- 0121 – Pseudopostega albogaleriella
- 0122 – Pseudopostega quadristrigella, gooseberry barkminer moth
- 0124 – Pseudopostega kempella
- 0125 – Opostegoides scioterma

== Tischeriidae ==
- 0126 – Coptotriche citrinipennella
- 0127 – Coptotriche mediostriata
- 0128 – Coptotriche consanguinea
- 0129 – Coptotriche badiiella
- 0130 – Coptotriche lucida
- 0131 – Coptotriche distincta
- 0132 – Coptotriche subnubila
- 0133 – Coptotriche concolor
- 0134 – Coptotriche simulata
- 0135 – Coptotriche purinosella
- 0136 – Coptotriche discreta
- 0137 – Coptotriche arizonica
- 0138 – Coptotriche clemensella
- 0139 – Coptotriche fuscomarginella
- 0140 – Coptotriche castaneaeella
- 0141 – Coptotriche perplexa
- 0143 – Coptotriche zelleriella
- 0144 – Tischeria quercitella, oak blotch miner moth
- 0145 – Coptotriche malifoliella, apple leaf trumpet miner moth
- 0146 – Coptotriche crataegifoliae
- 0147 – Coptotriche roseticola
- 0148 – Coptotriche agrimoniella
- 0149 – Coptotriche aenea, blackberry leafminer moth
- 0150 – Coptotriche splendida
- 0151 – Coptotriche insolita
- 0152 – Coptotriche confusa
- 0153 – Coptotriche inexpectata
- 0154 – Coptotriche amelanchieris
- 0155 – Coptotriche admirabilis
- 0156 – Astrotischeria solidagonifoliella
- 0157 – Astrotischeria astericola
- 0158 – Astrotischeria occidentalis
- 0159 – Astrotischeria heliopsisella
- 0160 – Astrotischeria ambrosiaeella
- 0161 – Astrotischeria helianthi
- 0162 – Astrotischeria gregaria
- 0163 – Astrotischeria marginata
- 0164 – Astrotischeria heteroterae
- 0165 – Astrotischeria longeciliata
- 0166 – Astrotischeria pallidipennella
- 0167 – Tischeria ceanothi
- 0169 – Tischeria ambigua
- 0170 – Tischeria bifurcata
- 0171 – Astrotischeria omissa
- 0172 – Astrotischeria explosa
- 0173 – Tischeria pulvella

== Incurvariidae and Prodoxidae ==
- 0174 – Incurvaria vetulella
- 0174.1 – Alloclemensia americana
- 0175 – Lampronia russatella
- 0176 – Lampronia oregonella
- 0177 – Lampronia capitella, currant shoot borer moth
- 0178 – Lampronia taylorella
- 0179 – Lampronia trimaculella
- 0180 – Lampronia rubiella, raspberry bud moth
- 0180.1 – Lampronia corticella, raspberry bud moth
- 0181 – Paraclemensia acerifoliella, maple leafcutter moth
- 0182 – Vespina quercivora
- 0183 – Phylloporia bistrigella
- 0184 – Lampronia aenescens
- 0185 – Lampronia sublustris
- 0186 – Lampronia humilis
- 0186.1 – Tetragma gei
- 0187 – Greya obscuromaculata
- 0188 – Greya sparsipunctella
- 0189 – Greya punctiferella
- 0189.1 – Greya piperella
- 0189.2 – Greya mitellae
- 0189.3 – Greya obscura
- 0190 – Greya variata
- 0191 – Greya subalba
- 0192 – Greya solenobiella
- 0192.1 – Greya suffusca
- 0193 – Greya reticulata
- 0193.1 – Greya powelli
- 0194 – Greya politella
- 0194.1 – Greya enchrysa
- 0194.2 – Greya variabilis
- 0194.3 – Greya pectinifera
- 0195 – Tridentaforma fuscoleuca
- 0196 – Tegeticula synthetica
- 0197 – Tegeticula maculata
- 0197.1 – Tegeticula altiplanella
- 0197.2 – Tegeticula cassandra
- 0197.3 – Tegeticula baccatella
- 0197.4 – Tegeticula intermedius
- 0197.5 – Tegeticula carnerosanella
- 0198 – Tegeticula yuccasella, yucca moth
- 0198.1 – Tegeticula corruptrix
- 0198.2 – Tegeticula elatella
- 0198.3 – Tegeticula maderae
- 0198.4 – Tegeticula mojavella
- 0198.5 – Tegeticula rostratella
- 0198.6 – Tegeticula superficiella
- 0198.7 – Tegeticula treculeanella
- 0199 – Parategeticula pollenifera
- 0200 – Prodoxus quinquepunctella
- 0200.1 – Prodoxus decipiens, bogus yucca moth
- 0201 – Prodoxus y-inversum
- 0201.1 – Prodoxus praedictus
- 0202 – Prodoxus coloradensis
- 0202.2 – Prodoxus phylloryctus
- 0203 – Prodoxus ochrocarus
- 0204 – Prodoxus sordidus
- 0205 – Prodoxus marginatus
- 0206 – Prodoxus pulverulentus
- 0207 – Prodoxus cinereus
- 0208 – Prodoxus aenescens
- 0209 – Mesepiola specca
- 0210 – Agavenema barberella
- 0211 – Agavenema pallida

== Adelidae ==
- 0212 – Cauchas dietziella
- 0213 – Cauchas cyanella
- 0214 – Cauchas sedella
- 0215 – Cauchas cockerelli
- 0216 – Cauchas simpliciella
- 0217 – Cauchas discalis
- 0218 – Nemophora bellela
- 0219 – Adela punctiferella
- 0220 – Adela singulella
- 0221 – Adela septentrionella
- 0222 – Adela oplerella
- 0223 – Adela thorpella
- 0224 – Adela flammeusella
- 0225 – Adela trigrapha
- 0226 – Adela eldorada
- 0227 – Adela caeruleella, southern longhorn moth
- 0228 – Adela ridingsella, Ridings' fairy moth
- 0229 – Adela purpurea

== Heliozelidae and Elachistidae ==
- 0230 – Heliozela aesella
- 0231 – Heliozela gracilis
- 0232 – Antispila cornifoliella
- 0233 – Antispila freemani
- 0234 – Antispila nysaefoliella, tupelo leafminer moth
- 0235 – Antispila eugeniella
- 0236 – Antispila isabella
- 0237 – Antispila viticordifoliella
- no number yet – Antispila oinophylla
- 0238 – Stephensia major
- 0239 – Antispila aurirubra
- 0240 – Antispila ampelopsifoliella
- 0241 – Antispila voraginella
- 0242 – Antispila argentifera
- 0243 – Antispila hydrangaeella
- 0244 – Coptodisca diospyriella
- 0245 – Coptodisca condaliae
- 0246 – Coptodisca ella
- 0247 – Coptodisca lucifluella
- 0248 – Coptodisca juglandiella
- 0249 – Coptodisca magnella
- 0250 – Coptodisca matheri
- 0251 – Coptodisca negligens
- 0252 – Coptodisca ostryaefoliella
- 0253 – Coptodisca saliciella
- 0254 – Coptodisca splendoriferella
- 0255 – Coptodisca arbutiella
- 0256 – Coptodisca kalmiella
- 0257 – Coptodisca ribesella
- 0258 – Coptodisca cercocarpella
- 0259 – Coptodisca quercicolella
- 0260 – Coptodisca powellella

== Tineidae and Acrolophidae ==
- 0261 – Nemapogon acapnopennella
- 0262 – Nemapogon angulifasciella
- 0263 – Nemapogon auropulvella
- 0263.5 – Nemapogon clematella
- 0264 – Nemapogon defectella
- 0265 – Nemapogon geniculatella
- 0266 – Nemapogon granella, European grain moth
- 0267 – Nemapogon interstitiella
- 0268 – Nemapogon molybdanella
- 0269 – Nemapogon multistriatella
- 0270 – Nemapogon ophrionella
- 0271 – Nemapogon oregonella
- 0272 – Nemapogon rileyi
- 0273 – Nemapogon roburella
- 0274 – Nemapogon tylodes
- 0275 – Nemapogon variatella
- 0276 – Doleromorpha porphyria
- 0277 – Eudarcia eunitariaeella
- 0278 – Eudarcia simulatricella
- 0279 – Diachorisia velatella
- 0280 – Bathroxena heteropalpella
- 0281 – Augolychna septemstrigella
- 0282 – Leucomele miriamella
- 0283 – Oenoe hybromella
- 0284 – Homosetia argentinotella
- 0285 – Homosetia argentistrigella
- 0286 – Homosetia auricristatella
- 0287 – Homosetia bifasciella
- 0288 – Homosetia chrysoadspersella
- 0289 – Homosetia costisignella
- 0290 – Homosetia cristatella
- 0291 – Homosetia fasciella
- 0292 – Homosetia fuscocristatella
- 0293 – Homosetia marginimaculella
- 0294 – Homosetia miscecristatella
- 0295 – Homosetia tricingulatella
- 0296 – Stenoptinea auriferella
- 0297 – Stenoptinea ornatella
- 0298 – Isocorypha chrysocomella
- 0299 – Isocorypha mediostriatella, old gold isocorypha moth
- 0300 – Hybroma servulella, yellow wave moth
- 0301 – Homostinea curviliniella
- 0302 – Pompostolella charipepla
- 0303 – Erechthias zebrina
- 0304 – Erechthias minuscula, Caribbean scavenger moth
- 0305 – Mea bipunctella, two-spotted mea moth
- 0306 – Mea skinnerella
- 0307 – Dryadaula visaliella
- 0307.1 – Dryadaula terpsichorella
- 0308 – Scardiella approximatella
- 0309 – Amorophaga cryptophori
- 0310 – Montescardia fuscofasciella
- 0311 – Scardia anatomella
- 0312 – Daviscardia coloradella
- 0313 – Morophagoides berkeleyella
- 0314 – Morophagoides burkerella
- 0315 – Diataga leptosceles
- 0316 – Xylesthia albicans
- 0317 – Xylesthia pruniramiella, Clemens' bark moth
- 0318 – Phryganeopsis brunnea
- 0319 – Kearfottia albifasciella
- 0320 – Hypoplesia busckiella
- 0321 – Hypoplesia dietziella
- 0322 – Dyotopasta yumaella
- 0323 – Tenaga pomiliella
- 0324 – Cephitinea obscurostrigella
- 0325 – Haplotinea insectella, fungus grain moth
- 0326 – Apreta paradoxella
- 0327 – Amydria apachella
- 0328 – Amydria arizonella
- 0329 – Amydria brevipennella
- 0330 – Amydria clemensella
- 0331 – Amydria confusella
- 0332 – Amydria curvistrigella
- 0333 – Amydria dyarella
- 0334 – Amydria effrentella
- 0335 – Amydria margoriella
- 0336 – Amydria obliquella
- 0337 – Amydria onagella
- 0338 – Acrolophus acanthogonus
- 0339 – Acrolophus acornus
- 0340 – Acrolophus arcanella, grass tubeworm moth
- 0341 – Acrolophus arizonellus
- 0342 – Acrolophus baldufi
- 0343 – Acrolophus bicornutus
- 0344 – Acrolophus chiricahuae
- 0345 – Acrolophus cockerelli
- 0346 – Acrolophus crescentella
- 0347 – Acrolophus cressoni, Cresson's grass tubeworm moth
- 0348 – Acrolophus davisellus
- 0349 – Acrolophus dorsimaculus
- 0350 – Acrolophus exaphristus
- 0351 – Acrolophus fervidus
- 0352 – Acrolophus filicornus
- 0353 – Acrolophus forbesi
- 0354 – Acrolophus furcatus
- 0355 – Acrolophus griseus
- 0355.1 – Acrolophus heppneri
- 0356 – Acrolophus juxtatus
- 0357 – Acrolophus kearfotti
- 0358 – Acrolophus klotsi
- 0359 – Acrolophus laticapitanus
- 0360 – Acrolophus leucodocis
- 0361 – Acrolophus luriei
- 0362 – Acrolophus macrogaster
- 0363 – Acrolophus macrophallus
- 0364 – Acrolophus maculifer
- 0365 – Acrolophus minor
- 0366 – Acrolophus mortipennella
- 0367 – Acrolophus morus
- 0367.1 – Acrolophus mycetophagus, frilly grass tubeworm moth
- 0368 – Acrolophus panamae, Panama grass tubeworm moth
- 0369 – Acrolophus parvipalpus
- 0370 – Acrolophus persimplex
- 0370.1 – Acrolophus pholeter
- 0371 – Acrolophus piger, piger grass tubeworm moth
- 0372 – Acrolophus plumifrontella, eastern grass tubeworm moth
- 0373 – Acrolophus popeanella, Clemens' grass tubeworm moth
- 0374 – Acrolophus propinquus, Walsingham's grass tubeworm moth
- 0375 – Acrolophus pseudohirsutus
- 0376 – Acrolophus punctellus
- 0377 – Acrolophus pyramellus
- 0378 – Acrolophus quadrellus
- 0379 – Acrolophus seculatus
- 0380 – Acrolophus serratus
- 0381 – Acrolophus simulatus
- 0382 – Acrolophus sinclairi
- 0382.1 – Acrolophus spilotus
- 0383 – Acrolophus texanella, Texas grass tubeworm moth
- 0384 – Acrolophus vanduzeei
- 0385 – Acrolophus variabilis
- 0386 – Acrolophus vauriei
- 0387 – Dorata atomophora
- 0388 – Dorata inornatella
- 0389 – Dorata lineata
- 0390 – Phereoeca uterella, household casebearer moth
- 0390.1 – Phereoeca praecox
- 0391 – Tryptodema sepulchrella
- 0392 – Tinea apicimaculella
- 0393 – Tinea behrensella
- 0394 – Tinea carnariella
- 0395 – Tinea columbariella
- 0396 – Tinea croceoverticella
- 0397 – Tinea dubiella
- 0398 – Tinea grumella
- 0399 – Tinea irrepta
- 0400 – Tinea mandarinella, Mandarin tinea moth
- 0401 – Tinea misceella
- 0402 – Tinea niveocapitella
- 0403 – Tinea occidentella, western clothes moth
- 0404 – Tinea pallescentella
- 0405 – Tinea pellionella, casemaking clothes moth
- 0406 – Tinea straminella, large pale clothes moth
- 0407 – Tinea thoracestrigella
- 0408 – Tinea translucens
- 0409 – Tinea unomaculella
- 0410 – Tinea xanthostictella
- 0411 – Niditinea fuscella, European house moth
- 0412 – Niditinea orleansella
- 0413 – Trichophaga tapetzella, carpet moth
- 0414 – Ceratophaga vicinella, gopher tortoise moth
- 0415 – Monopis crocicapitella, bird nest moth
- 0415.1 – Monopis laevigella
- 0415.2 – Monopis weaverella
- 0416 – Monopis dorsistrigella, skunkback monopis moth
- 0417 – Monopis marginistrigella
- 0418 – Monopis monachella, white-headed monopis moth
- 0418.1 – Monopis pavlovski, Pavlovski's monopis moth
- 0419 – Monopis mycetophilella
- 0420 – Monopis rusticella
- 0421 – Monopis spilotella
- 0422 – Eccritothrix trimaculella
- 0423 – Praeacedes atomosella, African scavenger moth
- 0425 – Elatobia carbonella
- 0426 – Tineola bisselliella, webbing clothes moth
- 0426.1 – Xystrologa antipathetica
- 0427 – Tiquadra inscitella
- 0428 – Setomorpha rutella, tropical tobacco moth
- 0429 – Lindera tessellatella
- 0430 – Phaeoses sabinella
- 0431 – Opogona arizonensis
- 0432 – Opogona floridensis
- 0432.1 – Opogona sacchari, banana moth
- 0433 – Opogona omoscopa
- 0433.1 – Opogona purpuriella
- 0434 – Oinophila v-flava
- 0434.1 – Pelecystola nearctica

== Psychidae ==
- 0435 – Taleporia walshella
- 0436 – Dahlica triquetrella
- 0436.1 – Dahlica lichenella
- 0437 – Psyche casta, common bagworm moth
- 0438 – Apterona helix, snailcase bagworm moth
- 0438.1 – Apterona helicoidella
- 0439 – Prochalia pygmaea
- 0440 – Zamopsyche commentella
- 0441 – Cryptothelea nigrita, nigrita bagworm moth
- 0442 – Cryptothelea gloverii
- 0443 – Astala confederata
- 0444 – Astala polingi
- 0445 – Astala edwardsi
- 0446 – Hyaloscotes coniferella
- 0447 – Hyaloscotes fragmentella
- 0448 – Hyaloscotes fumosa
- 0449 – Hyaloscotes pithopoera
- 0450 – Basicladus tracyi
- 0451 – Basicladus celibatus
- 0451.1 – Coloneura fragilis
- 0452 – Oiketicus toumeyi
- 0453 – Oiketicus townsendi
- 0454 – Oiketicus abbotii, Abbot's bagworm moth
- 0455 – Thyridopteryx meadii
- 0456 – Thyridopteryx alcora
- 0457 – Thyridopteryx ephemeraeformis, evergreen bagworm moth
- 0458 – Thyridopteryx rileyi
- 0459 – Thyridopteryx davidsoni
- 0460 – Ochsenheimeria vacculella, cereal stem moth
- 0461 – Euprora argentiliniella

== Lyonetiidae ==
- 0462 – Philonome clemensella
- 0463 – Philonome luteella
- 0464 – Philonome albella
- no number – Philonome nigrescens
- no number – Philonome wielgusi
- 0465 – Bedellia minor, Florida morning-glory leafminer moth
- 0466 – Bedellia somnulentella, morning-glory leafminer moth
- 0467 – Eulyonetia inornatella
- 0468 – Lyonetia alniella
- 0469 – Lyonetia candida
- 0470 – Lyonetia latistrigella
- 0471 – Lyonetia saliciella
- 0472 – Lyonetia prunifoliella
- 0473 – Acanthocnemes fuscoscapulella
- 0474 – Proleucoptera smilaciella
- 0475 – Paraleucoptera albella, cottonwood leafminer moth
- 0475.1 – Paraleucoptera heinrichi
- 0476 – Corythophora aurea
- 0477 – Leucoptera erythrinella
- 0478 – Leucoptera guettardella
- 0479 – Leucoptera laburnella, laburnum leaf miner moth
- 0480 – Leucoptera pachystimella
- 0481 – Leucoptera robinella
- 0482 – Leucoptera spartifoliella
- 0483 – Exegetia crocea

== Bucculatricidae ==
- 0484 – Bucculatrix fusicola
- 0485 – Bucculatrix solidaginiella
- 0486 – Bucculatrix montana
- 0487 – Bucculatrix magnella
- 0488 – Bucculatrix needhami
- 0489 – Bucculatrix longula
- 0490 – Bucculatrix simulans
- 0491 – Bucculatrix niveella
- 0492 – Bucculatrix parvinotata
- 0493 – Bucculatrix ochritincta
- 0494 – Bucculatrix viguierae
- 0495 – Bucculatrix micropunctata
- 0496 – Bucculatrix inusitata
- 0497 – Bucculatrix seneciensis
- 0498 – Bucculatrix bicristata
- 0499 – Bucculatrix cuneigera
- 0500 – Bucculatrix albaciliella
- 0501 – Bucculatrix ochristrigella
- 0502 – Bucculatrix eurotiella
- 0503 – Bucculatrix tenebricosa
- 0504 – Bucculatrix ericameriae
- 0505 – Bucculatrix variabilis
- 0505.1 – Bucculatrix dominatrix
- 0506 – Bucculatrix separabilis
- 0507 – Bucculatrix brunnescens
- 0508 – Bucculatrix evanescens
- 0509 – Bucculatrix benenotata
- 0510 – Bucculatrix floccosa
- 0511 – Bucculatrix flourensiae
- 0512 – Bucculatrix franseriae
- 0513 – Bucculatrix staintonella
- 0514 – Bucculatrix immaculatella
- 0515 – Bucculatrix agnella
- 0516 – Bucculatrix kimballi
- 0517 – Bucculatrix ivella
- 0518 – Bucculatrix ambrosiaefoliella
- 0519 – Bucculatrix pallidula
- 0520 – Bucculatrix taeniola
- 0521 – Bucculatrix carolinae
- 0522 – Bucculatrix angustata
- 0523 – Bucculatrix adelpha
- 0524 – Bucculatrix plucheae
- 0525 – Bucculatrix eupatoriella
- 0525.1 – Bucculatrix kendalli
- 0526 – Bucculatrix polymniae
- 0527 – Bucculatrix speciosa
- 0528 – Bucculatrix subnitens
- 0529 – Bucculatrix sexnotata
- 0530 – Bucculatrix divisa
- 0531 – Bucculatrix illecebrosa
- 0532 – Bucculatrix insolita
- 0533 – Bucculatrix transversata
- 0534 – Bucculatrix koebelella
- 0535 – Bucculatrix salutatoria
- 0536 – Bucculatrix leptalea
- 0537 – Bucculatrix arnicella
- 0538 – Bucculatrix tridenticola
- 0539 – Bucculatrix spectabilis
- 0540 – Bucculatrix seorsa
- 0541 – Bucculatrix angustisquamella
- 0542 – Bucculatrix columbiana
- 0543 – Bucculatrix sororcula
- 0544 – Bucculatrix nigripunctella
- 0545 – Bucculatrix atrosignata
- 0546 – Bucculatrix enceliae
- 0547 – Bucculatrix latella
- 0547.1 – Bucculatrix tetradymiae
- 0548 – Bucculatrix sporobolella
- 0549 – Bucculatrix packardella
- 0550 – Bucculatrix albertiella, oak-ribbed skeletonizer moth
- 0551 – Bucculatrix coniforma
- 0552 – Bucculatrix platyphylla
- 0553 – Bucculatrix ochrisuffusa
- 0554 – Bucculatrix trifasciella
- 0555 – Bucculatrix quinquenotella
- 0556 – Bucculatrix domicola
- 0557 – Bucculatrix zophopasta
- 0558 – Bucculatrix litigiosella
- 0559 – Bucculatrix coronatella
- 0560 – Bucculatrix canadensisella, birch skeletonizer moth
- 0561 – Bucculatrix improvisa
- 0562 – Bucculatrix polytita
- 0563 – Bucculatrix luteella
- 0564 – Bucculatrix recognita
- 0565 – Bucculatrix paroptila
- 0566 – Bucculatrix fugitans
- 0567 – Bucculatrix callistricha
- 0568 – Bucculatrix eugrapha
- 0569 – Bucculatrix cerina
- 0570 – Bucculatrix copeuta
- 0571 – Bucculatrix locuples
- 0572 – Bucculatrix ainsliella, oak skeletonizer moth
- 0573 – Bucculatrix eclecta
- 0574 – Bucculatrix anaticula
- 0575 – Bucculatrix disjuncta
- 0576 – Bucculatrix ceanothiella
- 0577 – Bucculatrix pomifoliella
- 0578 – Bucculatrix ilecella
- 0579 – Bucculatrix quadrigemina
- 0580 – Bucculatrix gossypiella
- 0581 – Bucculatrix sphaeralceae
- 0582 – Bucculatrix thurberiella
- 0582.1 – Bucculatrix frigida

== Gracillariidae ==
- 0583 – Caloptilia aceriella
- 0584 – Caloptilia acerifoliella
- 0585 – Caloptilia agrifoliella
- 0586 – Caloptilia alnicolella
- 0587 – Caloptilia alnivorella, alder leafminer moth
- 0588 – Caloptilia amphidelta
- 0589 – Caloptilia anthobaphes
- 0590 – Caloptilia asplenifoliatella
- 0591 – Caloptilia atomosella
- 0592 – Caloptilia azaleella, azalea leafminer moth
- 0593 – Caloptilia behrensella
- 0594 – Caloptilia belfragella
- 0594.1 – Caloptilia betulivora
- 0595 – Caloptilia bimaculatella
- 0596 – Caloptilia blandella
- 0597 – Caloptilia burgessiella
- 0598 – Caloptilia burserella
- 0599 – Caloptilia canadensisella
- 0600 – Caloptilia cornusella
- 0601 – Caloptilia coroniella
- 0602 – Caloptilia diversilobiella
- 0603 – Caloptilia ferruginella
- 0604 – Caloptilia flavella
- 0605 – Caloptilia flavimaculella
- 0606 – Caloptilia fraxinella, ash leaf cone roller moth
- 0607 – Caloptilia glutinella
- 0608 – Caloptilia hypericella
- 0609 – Caloptilia invariabilis, cherry leaf-cone caterpillar moth
- 0610 – Caloptilia juglandiella
- 0611 – Caloptilia macranthes
- 0612 – Caloptilia melanocarpae
- 0613 – Caloptilia minimella
- 0614 – Caloptilia murtfeldtella
- 0615 – Caloptilia negundella, boxelder leafroller moth
- 0616 – Caloptilia nondeterminata
- 0617 – Caloptilia obscuripennella
- 0618 – Caloptilia ostryaeella
- 0619 – Caloptilia ovatiella
- 0620 – Caloptilia packardella
- 0621 – Caloptilia palustriella
- 0622 – Caloptilia paradoxa
- 0623 – Caloptilia perseae
- 0624 – Caloptilia populiella
- 0625 – Caloptilia porphyretica
- 0626 – Caloptilia pulchella
- 0627 – Povolnya quercinigrella
- 0628 – Caloptilia reticulata
- 0629 – Caloptilia rhodorella
- 0630 – Caloptilia rhoifoliella, sumac leafblotch miner moth
- 0631 – Caloptilia ribesella
- 0632 – Caloptilia sanguinella
- 0633 – Caloptilia sassafrasella, sassafras caloptilia moth
- 0634 – Caloptilia sauzalitoeella
- 0635 – Caloptilia scutellariella
- 0636 – Caloptilia sebastianiella
- 0637 – Caloptilia serotinella
- 0638 – Caloptilia speciosella
- 0639 – Caloptilia stigmatella
- 0640 – Caloptilia strictella
- 0641 – Caloptilia superbifrontella
- 0642 – Caloptilia umbratella
- 0643 – Caloptilia vacciniella
- 0644 – Caloptilia violacella
- 0645 – Caloptilia syringella, lilac leafminer moth
- 0646 – Neurostrota gunniella
- 0647 – Micrurapteryx salicifoliella, willow leafblotch miner moth
- 0648 – Parectopa albicostella
- 0649 – Parectopa basquella
- 0650 – Parectopa bumeliella
- 0651 – Parectopa geraniella
- 0652 – Parectopa interpositella
- 0653 – Parectopa lespedezaefoliella
- 0654 – Parectopa occulta
- 0655 – Parectopa pennsylvaniella
- 0656 – Parectopa plantaginisella
- 0657 – Parectopa robiniella, locust digitate leafminer moth
- 0658 – Parectopa thermopsella
- 0659 – Neurolipa randiella
- 0660 – Apophthisis congregata
- 0661 – Apophthisis pullata
- 0662 – Neurobathra bohartiella
- 0663 – Neurobathra strigifinitella
- 0663.1 – Neurobathra curcassi, jatropha leafminer moth
- 0664 – Callisto denticulella
- 0665 – Parornix alta
- 0666 – Parornix arbitrella
- 0667 – Parornix arbutifoliella
- 0668 – Parornix boreasella
- 0669 – Parornix conspicuella
- 0670 – Parornix crataegifoliella
- 0671 – Parornix dubitella
- 0672 – Parornix festinella
- 0673 – Parornix geminatella, unspotted tentiform leafminer moth
- 0674 – Parornix innotata
- 0675 – Parornix inusitatumella
- 0676 – Parornix kalmiella
- 0677 – Parornix melanotella
- 0678 – Parornix obliterella
- 0679 – Parornix peregrinaella
- 0680 – Parornix preciosella
- 0681 – Parornix quadripunctella
- 0681.1 – Parornix solitariella
- 0682 – Parornix spiraeifoliella
- 0683 – Parornix strobivorella
- 0684 – Parornix texanella
- 0685 – Parornix trepidella
- 0686 – Parornix vicinella
- 0687 – Chilocampyla dyariella
- 0688 – Acrocercops affinis
- 0689 – Acrocercops albinatella
- 0690 – Acrocercops arbutella
- 0691 – Acrocercops insulariella
- 0692 – Acrocercops astericola
- 0693 – Acrocercops pnosmodiella
- 0694 – Acrocercops quinquistrigella
- 0695 – Acrocercops rhombiderella
- 0696 – Eucosmophora sideroxylonella
- 0696.1 – Eucosmophora manilkarae
- 0696.2 – Eucosmophora pithecollobiae
- 0697 – Acrocercops strigosus
- 0698 – Leucospilapteryx venustella
- 0699 – Metriochroa psychotriella
- 0700 – Leucanthiza amphicarpeaefoliella
- 0701 – Leucanthiza dircella
- 0702 – Marmara apocynella
- 0703 – Marmara arbutiella
- 0704 – Marmara auratella
- 0705 – Marmara basidendroca
- 0706 – Marmara corticola
- 0707 – Marmara elotella, apple barkminer moth
- 0708 – Marmara fasciella, white pine barkminer moth
- 0709 – Marmara fraxinicola
- 0710 – Marmara fulgidella
- 0711 – Marmara guilandinella
- 0712 – Marmara leptodesma
- 0713 – Marmara opuntiella
- 0714 – Marmara oregonensis
- 0715 – Marmara pomonella, apple fruitminer moth
- 0716 – Marmara salictella
- 0717 – Marmara serotinella
- 0718 – Marmara smilacisella
- 0718.1 – Marmara gulosa, citrus peelminer moth
- no number yet – Marmara habecki
- 0719 – Protolithocolletis lathyri
- 0720 – Cremastobombycia ambrosiella
- 0721 – Cremastobombycia grindeliella
- 0722 – Cremastobombycia ignota
- 0723 – Cremastobombycia solidaginis
- 0724 – Cremastobombycia verbesinella
- 0725 – Phyllonorycter aberrans
- 0726 – Phyllonorycter aeriferella
- 0726.1 – Phyllonorycter alaskana
- 0727 – Phyllonorycter albanotella
- 0728 – Phyllonorycter alni
- 0729 – Phyllonorycter alnicolella
- 0730 – Phyllonorycter antiochella
- 0731 – Phyllonorycter apicinigrella
- 0732 – Phyllonorycter arbutusella
- 0733 – Phyllonorycter argentifimbriella
- 0734 – Phyllonorycter argentinotella
- 0735 – Phyllonorycter arizonella
- 0736 – Phyllonorycter apparella, aspen leaf blotch miner moth
- 0737 – Phyllonorycter auronitens
- 0738 – Phyllonorycter basistrigella
- 0739 – Phyllonorycter bataviella
- 0740 – Phyllonorycter blancardella, spotted tentiform leafminer moth
- 0741 – Phyllonorycter caryaealbella, pecan blotchminer moth
- 0742 – Phyllonorycter celtifoliella
- 0743 – Phyllonorycter celtisella
- 0744 – Phyllonorycter clemensella
- 0745 – Phyllonorycter comptoniella
- 0746 – Phyllonorycter crataegella, apple blotch leafminer moth
- 0747 – Phyllonorycter cretaceella
- 0748 – Phyllonorycter deceptusella
- 0748.1 – Phyllonorycter deserticola
- 0749 – Phyllonorycter diaphanella
- 0750 – Phyllonorycter diversella
- 0750.1 – Phyllonorycter emberizaepenella
- 0750.2 – Phyllonorycter elmaella, western tentiform leafminer moth
- 0750.3 – Phyllonorycter erugatus
- 0751 – Phyllonorycter felinelle
- 0752 – Phyllonorycter fitchella
- 0753 – Phyllonorycter fragilella
- 0754 – Phyllonorycter gemmea
- 0755 – Phyllonorycter hagenii
- 0756 – Phyllonorycter holodisci
- 0757 – Phyllonorycter incanella
- 0758 – Phyllonorycter insignis
- 0759 – Phyllonorycter intermixtus
- 0760 – Phyllonorycter inusitatella
- 0761 – Phyllonorycter kearfottella
- 0761.1 – Phyllonorycter latus
- 0763 – Phyllonorycter ledella
- 0764 – Phyllonorycter lucetiella, basswood miner moth
- 0765 – Phyllonorycter lucidicostella, lesser maple leaf blotch miner moth
- 0766 – Phyllonorycter lysimachiaeella
- 0767 – Phyllonorycter malimalifoliella
- 0768 – Phyllonorycter manzanita
- 0769 – Phyllonorycter mariaeella
- 0770 – Phyllonorycter martiella
- 0771 – Phyllonorycter memorabilis
- 0771.1 – Phyllonorycter mespilella
- 0771.2 – Phyllonorycter mildredae
- 0772 – Phyllonorycter minutella
- 0773 – Phyllonorycter morrisella
- 0774 – Phyllonorycter nipigon, balsam poplar leaf blotch miner moth
- 0775 – Phyllonorycter obscuricostella
- 0776 – Phyllonorycter obsoleta
- 0777 – Phyllonorycter occitanica
- 0778 – Phyllonorycter olivaeformis
- 0780 – Phyllonorycter oregonensis
- 0781 – Phyllonorycter ostryaefoliella
- 0782 – Phyllonorycter pernivalis
- 0783 – Phyllonorycter populiella, poplar leafminer moth
- 0784 – Phyllonorycter propinquinella, cherry blotch miner moth
- 0785 – Phyllonorycter quercialbella
- 0786 – Phyllonorycter restrictella
- 0787 – Phyllonorycter rhododendrella
- 0788 – Phyllonorycter ribefoliae
- 0789 – Phyllonorycter rileyella
- 0790 – Phyllonorycter robiniella
- 0791 – Phyllonorycter salicifoliella, willow leaf blotch miner moth
- 0792 – Phyllonorycter salicivorella
- 0793 – Phyllonorycter sandraella
- 0794 – Phyllonorycter scudderella
- 0795 – Phyllonorycter sexnotella
- 0796 – Phyllonorycter symphoricarpaeella
- 0797 – Phyllonorycter tiliacella, basswood round-blotch miner moth
- 0799 – Phyllonorycter trinotella
- 0800 – Phyllonorycter tritaenianella
- 0801 – Phyllonorycter uhlerella
- 0802 – Phyllonorycter viburnella
- 0803 – Cameraria aceriella, maple leaf blotch miner moth
- 0804 – Cameraria aesculisella
- 0805 – Cameraria affinis
- 0806 – Cameraria agrifoliella
- 0806.1 – Cameraria anomala
- 0807 – Cameraria arcuella
- 0808 – Cameraria australisella
- 0809 – Cameraria bethunella
- 0810 – Cameraria betulivora, birch-leaf blotchminer moth
- 0811 – Cameraria caryaefoliella, pecan leafminer moth
- 0812 – Cameraria castaneaeella
- 0813 – Cameraria cervina
- 0814 – Cameraria chambersella
- 0815 – Cameraria cincinnatiella, gregarious oak leafminer moth
- 0816 – Cameraria conglomeratella
- 0817 – Cameraria corylisella
- 0817.1 – Cameraria diabloensis
- 0818 – Cameraria eppelsheimii
- 0819 – Cameraria fasciella
- 0820 – Cameraria fletcherella
- 0821 – Cameraria gaultheriella
- 0822 – Cameraria guttifinitella
- 0823 – Cameraria hamadryadella, solitary oak leafminer moth
- 0824 – Cameraria hamameliella
- 0824.1 – Cameraria jacintoensis
- 0825 – Cameraria lentella
- 0826 – Cameraria leucothorax
- 0826.1 – Cameraria lobatiella
- 0827 – Cameraria macrocarpae
- 0828 – Cameraria macrocarpella
- 0828.1 – Cameraria marinensis
- 0829 – Cameraria mediodorsella
- 0829.1 – Cameraria mendocinensis
- 0830 – Cameraria nemoris
- 0831 – Cameraria obstrictella
- 0832 – Cameraria ostryarella
- 0832.1 – Cameraria pentekes
- 0833 – Cameraria picturatella
- 0834 – Cameraria platanoidiella
- 0835 – Cameraria quercivorella
- 0836 – Cameraria saccharella
- 0836.1 – Cameraria sadlerianella
- 0836.2 – Cameraria sempervirensella
- 0836.3 – Cameraria serpentinensis
- 0836.4 – Cameraria shenaniganensis
- 0837 – Cameraria superimposita
- 0837.1 – Cameraria tildeni
- 0837.2 – Cameraria temblorensis
- 0838 – Cameraria tubiferella
- 0839 – Cameraria ulmella
- 0840 – Cameraria umbellulariae
- 0840.1 – Cameraria walsinghami
- 0841 – Cameraria wislizeniella
- 0842 – Chrysaster ostensackenella
- 0843 – Porphyrosela desmodiella
- 0844 – Phyllocnistis ampelopsiella
- 0845 – Phyllocnistis finitima
- 0846 – Phyllocnistis insignis
- 0847 – Phyllocnistis intermediella
- 0848 – Phyllocnistis liquidambarisella
- 0849 – Phyllocnistis liriodendronella
- 0850 – Phyllocnistis magnatella
- 0851 – Phyllocnistis magnoliella, magnolia serpentine leafminer moth
- 0851.1 – Phyllocnistis meliacella, mahogany leafminer moth
- 0852 – Phyllocnistis populiella, aspen serpentine leafminer moth
- 0853 – Phyllocnistis vitegenella
- 0854 – Phyllocnistis vitifoliella
- 0854.1 – Phyllocnistis citrella, citrus leafminer moth
- No number yet Phyllocnistis hyperpersea
- No number yet Phyllocnistis longipalpa
- No number yet Phyllocnistis subpersea

== See also ==
- List of butterflies of North America
- List of Lepidoptera of Hawaii
- List of moths of Canada
- List of butterflies of Canada
