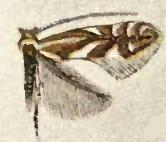

Scientific classification
- Domain: Eukaryota
- Kingdom: Animalia
- Phylum: Arthropoda
- Class: Insecta
- Order: Lepidoptera
- Family: Gracillariidae
- Genus: Phyllonorycter
- Species: P. propinquinella

Binomial name
- Phyllonorycter propinquinella (Braun, 1908)

Synonyms
- Lithocolletis propinquinella Braun, 1908

= Phyllonorycter propinquinella =

Species of moth

Phyllonorycter propinquinella, the cherry blotch miner moth, is a moth of the family Gracillariidae. It is known from Canada (Québec and Nova Scotia) and the United States (Illinois, Ohio, Maine, Maryland, New York, Michigan, Vermont and Connecticut).

The wingspan is 8–9 mm.

The larvae feed on Prunus serotina.
