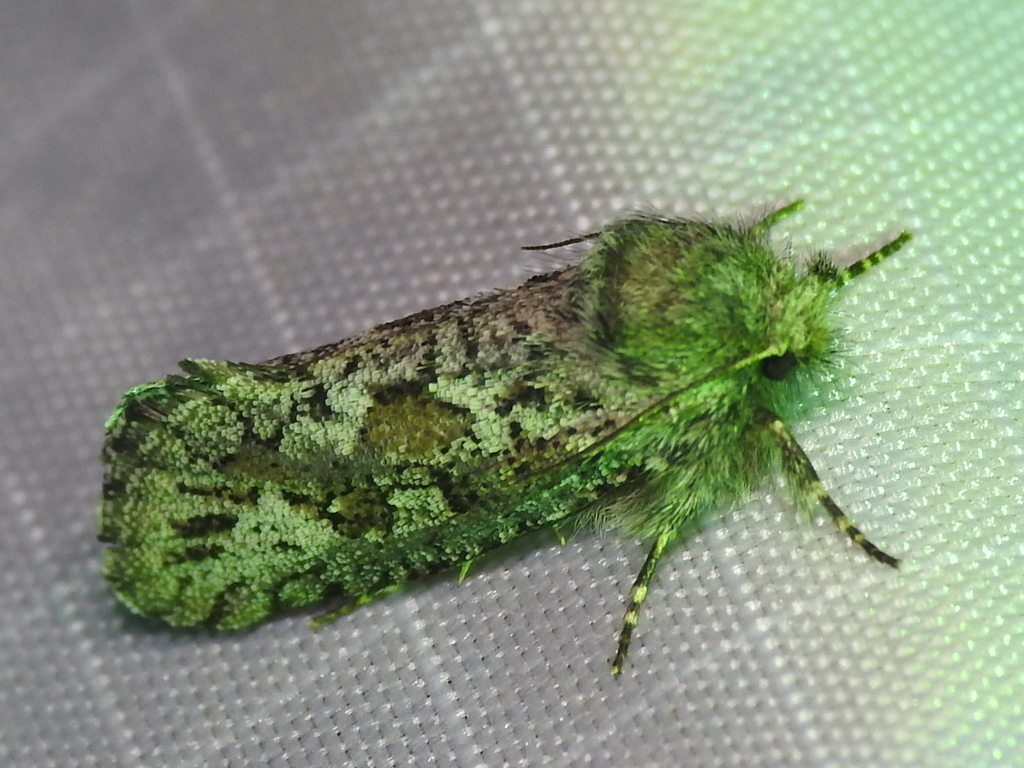

Scientific classification
- Kingdom: Animalia
- Phylum: Arthropoda
- Clade: Pancrustacea
- Class: Insecta
- Order: Lepidoptera
- Family: Tineidae
- Genus: Acrolophus
- Species: A. minor

Binomial name
- Acrolophus minor (Dyar, 1903)

Synonyms
- Pseudanaphora minor Dyar, 1903; Homonymus coloradellus Walsingham 1907

= Acrolophus minor =

Species of moth

Acrolophus minor is a moth of the family Acrolophidae. It was described by Harrison Gray Dyar Jr. in 1903. It is found in North America, including Arizona.
