= Stigmella aromella =

Scientific classification
- Kingdom: Animalia
- Phylum: Arthropoda
- Clade: Pancrustacea
- Class: Insecta
- Order: Lepidoptera
- Family: Nepticulidae
- Genus: Stigmella
- Species: S. aromella

Binomial name
- Stigmella aromella Wilkinson & Scoble, 1979

Species of moth

Stigmella aromella is a moth of the family Nepticulidae which is endemic to Ontario, Canada.

Late instar larvae have been found in mid-August and mid-September, with adults on wing in February, March and late August. There are probably two generations per year.

The larvae feed on Populus species, including Populus deltoides and Populus x canadensis. They mine the leaves of their host plant.
