= Stigmella unifasciella =

Scientific classification
- Kingdom: Animalia
- Phylum: Arthropoda
- Clade: Pancrustacea
- Class: Insecta
- Order: Lepidoptera
- Family: Nepticulidae
- Genus: Stigmella
- Species: S. unifasciella

Binomial name
- Stigmella unifasciella (Chambers, 1875)

Synonyms
- Nepticula unifasciella Chambers, 1875

Species of moth

Stigmella unifasciella is a moth of the family Nepticulidae. It is found in the United States in Kentucky, Ohio, Maryland, Illinois, Texas and Massachusetts.

The wingspan is 4.5-7.4 mm. There are possibly two generations per year. Adults have been collected in mid-June in Ohio and in late July on Plummers Island in Maryland.

The host plant is unknown, but might be a Quercus species.
