= Stigmella fuscotibiella =

Scientific classification
- Kingdom: Animalia
- Phylum: Arthropoda
- Clade: Pancrustacea
- Class: Insecta
- Order: Lepidoptera
- Family: Nepticulidae
- Genus: Stigmella
- Species: S. fuscotibiella

Binomial name
- Stigmella fuscotibiella (Clemens, 1862)

Synonyms
- Nepticula fuscotibiella Clemens, 1862; Nepticula ciliaefuscella Chambers, 1873; Nepticula discolorella Braun, 1912

Species of moth

Stigmella fuscotibiella is a moth of the family Nepticulidae. It is found in North America in Ohio, Pennsylvania, Kentucky, Colorado, Maine, Massachusetts, Ontario and Nova Scotia.

Mine

The wingspan is 4-4.5 mm. There are at least three generations per year and larvae may be collected from June until the end of October.

The larvae feed on Salix species, including S. nigra and S. discolor. They mine the leaves of their host plant.
