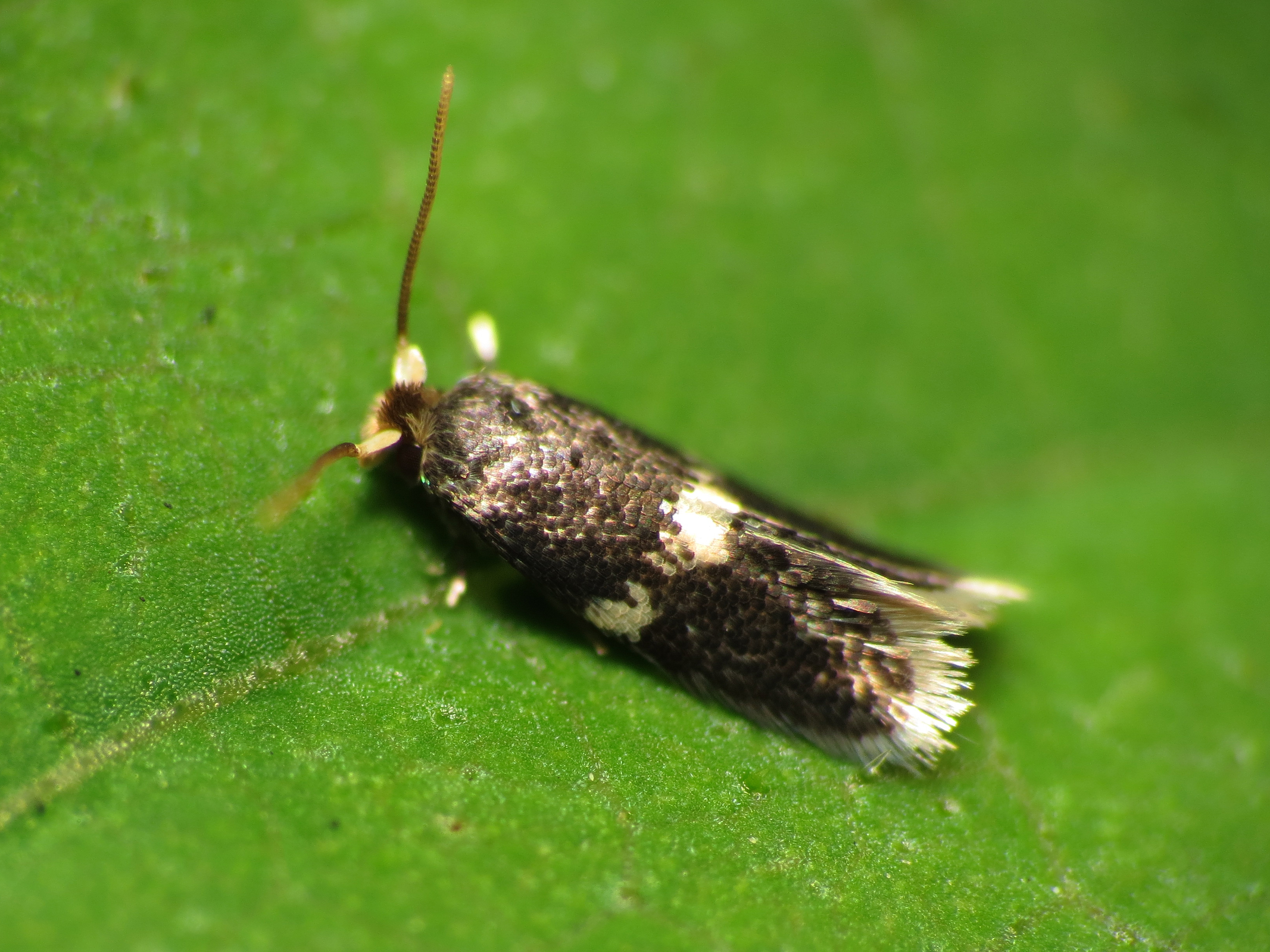

Scientific classification
- Kingdom: Animalia
- Phylum: Arthropoda
- Class: Insecta
- Order: Lepidoptera
- Family: Nepticulidae
- Genus: Stigmella
- Species: S. macrocarpae

Binomial name
- Stigmella macrocarpae (Freeman, 1967)

Synonyms
- Nepticula latifasciella Chambers, in Hayden, 1878 (not Nepticula latifasciella Herrich-Schaffer, 1855); Nepticula macrocarpae Freeman, 1967; Stigmella latifasciella Chambers, 1878

= Stigmella macrocarpae =

Species of moth

Stigmella macrocarpae is a moth of the family Nepticulidae. It is found in North America in Arkansas, Florida, Georgia, Illinois, Indiana, Kentucky, Maryland, Massachusetts, Michigan, New York, Ohio, Pennsylvania, South Carolina, Virginia, West Virginia, Ontario and British Columbia.

There are probably three generations per year in most of its range.

The larvae feed on Quercus species, including Quercus rubra and the host for which the species is named, Quercus macrocarpa. They mine the leaves of their host plant.

This species was formerly known as Stigmella latifasciella (from its original description by Chambers in 1878), but the name latifasciella had been assigned to a different European species in the same genus by Gottlieb August Wilhelm Herrich-Schäffer in 1855.
