= Stigmella resplendensella =

Scientific classification
- Kingdom: Animalia
- Phylum: Arthropoda
- Clade: Pancrustacea
- Class: Insecta
- Order: Lepidoptera
- Family: Nepticulidae
- Genus: Stigmella
- Species: S. resplendensella

Binomial name
- Stigmella resplendensella (Chambers, 1875)

Synonyms
- Nepticula resplendensella Chambers, 1875

Species of moth

Stigmella resplendensella is a moth of the family Nepticulidae. It is found in North America, including Kentucky.

The wingspan is about 6 mm.

The larvae feed on Celtis occidentalis. They mine the leaves of their host plant.
