= Phyllonorycter comptoniella =

Scientific classification
- Domain: Eukaryota
- Kingdom: Animalia
- Phylum: Arthropoda
- Class: Insecta
- Order: Lepidoptera
- Family: Gracillariidae
- Genus: Phyllonorycter
- Species: P. comptoniella

Binomial name
- Phyllonorycter comptoniella (Darlington, 1949)

Species of moth

Phyllonorycter comptoniella is a moth of the family Gracillariidae. It is known from Canada (Nova Scotia, Québec) and the United States (Connecticut, New Jersey and Vermont).

The larvae feed on Comptonia peregrina. They probably mine the leaves of their host plant.
