= Stigmella longisacca =

Scientific classification
- Kingdom: Animalia
- Phylum: Arthropoda
- Clade: Pancrustacea
- Class: Insecta
- Order: Lepidoptera
- Family: Nepticulidae
- Genus: Stigmella
- Species: S. longisacca

Binomial name
- Stigmella longisacca Newton & Wilkinson, 1982

Species of moth

Stigmella longisacca is a moth of the family Nepticulidae. It is found in California, United States.

The wingspan is 3.2-4.4 mm. There are two and possibly three generations per year.

The larvae feed on Juglans species, including Juglans californica. They mine the leaves of their host plant.
