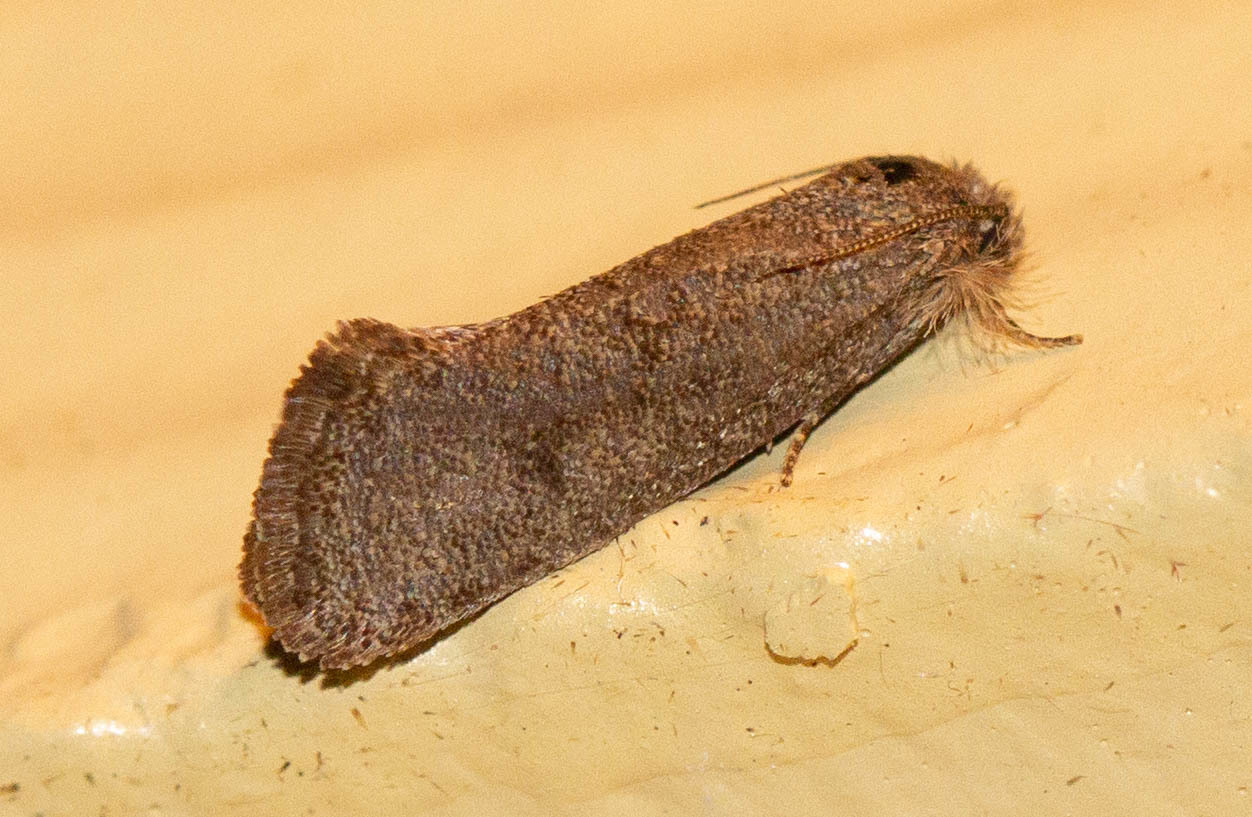

Scientific classification
- Kingdom: Animalia
- Phylum: Arthropoda
- Clade: Pancrustacea
- Class: Insecta
- Order: Lepidoptera
- Family: Tineidae
- Genus: Acrolophus
- Species: A. heppneri

Binomial name
- Acrolophus heppneri Davis, 1990

= Acrolophus heppneri =

Species of moth

Acrolophus heppneri is a moth of the family Acrolophidae. It was described by Donald R. Davis in 1990. It is found in North America, including the US states of Alabama, Florida, Mississippi and Texas.

The wingspan is about 17 mm.
