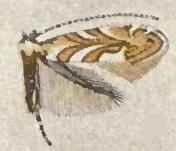

Scientific classification
- Domain: Eukaryota
- Kingdom: Animalia
- Phylum: Arthropoda
- Class: Insecta
- Order: Lepidoptera
- Family: Gracillariidae
- Genus: Phyllonorycter
- Species: P. arbutusella

Binomial name
- Phyllonorycter arbutusella (Braun, 1908)

Synonyms
- Lithocolletis arbutusella Braun, 1908; Phyllonorycter arbutella (Meyrick, 1912)

= Phyllonorycter arbutusella =

Species of moth

Phyllonorycter arbutusella is a moth of the family Gracillariidae. It is known from California, United States.

The wingspan is about 8 mm.

The larvae feed on Arbutus menziesii. They mine the leaves of their host plant.
