= Ectoedemia reneella =

Scientific classification
- Kingdom: Animalia
- Phylum: Arthropoda
- Clade: Pancrustacea
- Class: Insecta
- Order: Lepidoptera
- Family: Nepticulidae
- Genus: Ectoedemia
- Species: E. reneella

Binomial name
- Ectoedemia reneella Wilkinson, 1981

Species of moth

Ectoedemia reneella is a moth of the family Nepticulidae. It was described by Wilkinson in 1981. It is known from Florida.

The wingspan is about 6 mm.
