= Stigmella apicialbella =

Scientific classification
- Kingdom: Animalia
- Phylum: Arthropoda
- Clade: Pancrustacea
- Class: Insecta
- Order: Lepidoptera
- Family: Nepticulidae
- Genus: Stigmella
- Species: S. apicialbella

Binomial name
- Stigmella apicialbella (Chambers, 1873)

Synonyms
- Nepticula apicialbella Chambers, 1873; Nepticula leucostigma Braun, 1912

Species of moth

Stigmella apicialbella is a moth of the family Nepticulidae. It is found in Kentucky and Ohio of the United States.

Mine

The wingspan is 3.6-4.8 mm.
