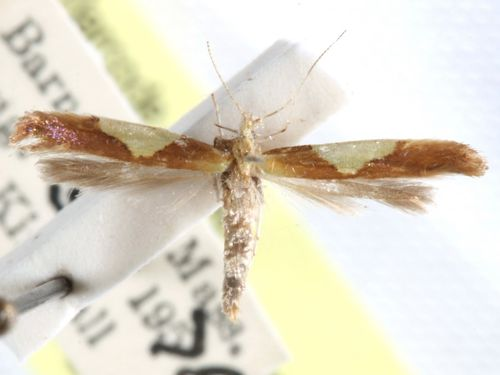

Scientific classification
- Kingdom: Animalia
- Phylum: Arthropoda
- Clade: Pancrustacea
- Class: Insecta
- Order: Lepidoptera
- Family: Gracillariidae
- Genus: Caloptilia
- Species: C. glutinella

Binomial name
- Caloptilia glutinella (Ely, 1915)

Synonyms
- Gracilaria glutinella

= Caloptilia glutinella =

Species of moth

Caloptilia glutinella is a moth of the family Gracillariidae. It is found in Canada and the United States. The species was first described by Charles Russell Ely in 1915.

The larvae feed on Alnus species, including Alnus serrulata and Alnus glutinosa. They mine the leaves of their host plant.

== Description ==
The wingspan ranges from 12–13 mm (0.47–0.51 in). The face is yellow, and the head and thorax are a reddish bronze. The antennae are brown-striped with yellowish coloration at the joints. The abdomen is pale yellow-grey above and pale yellow below. The tibiae and femora of the front and middle legs are reddish bronze, and the tarsi are white with few dark scales at the joints. The hind legs are pale yellowish gray with the tibia shaded brown near the tarsal joint. The forewing is reddish bronze and the wings are marked by a golden triangle on the costal margin. The apex of the triangular marking extends inward to the middle of the wing. The hindwing is dark gray with paler cilia.

In broods that emerge in later summer months, the bright yellow typical of C. glutinella dulls to a straw color and the forewings darken to a deeper purplish color. It can be assumed from this that the species has a seasonal color form.

== Etymology ==
The species is named after their host plant Alnus glutinosa.
