= Phyllonorycter elmaella =

Scientific classification
- Kingdom: Animalia
- Phylum: Arthropoda
- Class: Insecta
- Order: Lepidoptera
- Family: Gracillariidae
- Genus: Phyllonorycter
- Species: P. elmaella

Binomial name
- Phyllonorycter elmaella Doğanlar & Mutuura, 1980

Species of moth

Phyllonorycter elmaella, the western tentiform leafminer, is a moth of the family Gracillariidae. It is known from British Columbia in Canada and California, Oregon, Washington and Utah in the United States.

The wingspan is about 6 mm.
