= Phyllonorycter viburnella =

Scientific classification
- Domain: Eukaryota
- Kingdom: Animalia
- Phylum: Arthropoda
- Class: Insecta
- Order: Lepidoptera
- Family: Gracillariidae
- Genus: Phyllonorycter
- Species: P. viburnella

Binomial name
- Phyllonorycter viburnella (Braun, 1923)

Species of moth

Phyllonorycter viburnella is a moth of the family Gracillariidae. It is known from Quebec in Canada and Connecticut and Ohio in the United States.
