= Stigmella ceanothi =

Scientific classification
- Kingdom: Animalia
- Phylum: Arthropoda
- Clade: Pancrustacea
- Class: Insecta
- Order: Lepidoptera
- Family: Nepticulidae
- Genus: Stigmella
- Species: S. ceanothi

Binomial name
- Stigmella ceanothi (Braun, 1910)

Synonyms
- Nepticula ceanothi Braun, 1910

Species of moth

Stigmella ceanothi is a moth of the family Nepticulidae. It is found in California, United States.

Mine

The wingspan is 3.2-6.6 mm. Adults are on wing in March, mid-April, mid-May and September. There are two and possibly three generations per year.

The larvae feed on Ceanothus divaricatus. They mine the leaves of their host plant.
