= Phyllonorycter alni =

Scientific classification
- Kingdom: Animalia
- Phylum: Arthropoda
- Class: Insecta
- Order: Lepidoptera
- Family: Gracillariidae
- Genus: Phyllonorycter
- Species: P. alni

Binomial name
- Phyllonorycter alni (Walsingham, 1891)

Synonyms
- Lithocolletis alni Walsingham, 1891; Phyllonorycter alnivorella (Chambers, 1875)

Species of moth

Phyllonorycter alni is a moth of the family Gracillariidae. It is known Colorado and Maine in the United States.

The wingspan is about 5.5 mm.

The larvae feed on Alnus species, including Alnus tenuifolia. They mine the leaves of their host plant.
