= Caloptilia sanguinella =

Scientific classification
- Domain: Eukaryota
- Kingdom: Animalia
- Phylum: Arthropoda
- Class: Insecta
- Order: Lepidoptera
- Family: Gracillariidae
- Genus: Caloptilia
- Species: C. sanguinella

Binomial name
- Caloptilia sanguinella (Beutenmüller, 1888)

Synonyms
- Caloptilia fuscoochrella (Beutenmüller, 1889); Caloptilia nigristrigella (Beutenmüller, 1888); Caloptilia ruptistrigella (Beutenmüller, 1888); Caloptilia ruptostrigella (Dyar, [1903]); Caloptilia shastaella (Dyar, [1903] ); Caloptilia shastella (Beutenmüller, 1888)

Species of moth

Caloptilia sanguinella is a moth of the family Gracillariidae. It is known from California and Maine in the United States.
