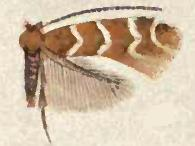

Scientific classification
- Kingdom: Animalia
- Phylum: Arthropoda
- Clade: Pancrustacea
- Class: Insecta
- Order: Lepidoptera
- Family: Gracillariidae
- Genus: Phyllonorycter
- Species: P. mariaeella

Binomial name
- Phyllonorycter mariaeella (Chambers, 1875)

Synonyms
- Lithocolletis mariaeella Chambers, 1875; Phyllonorycter mariaella Maier & Davis, 1989; Phyllonorycter mariella (Riley, 1891)

= Phyllonorycter mariaeella =

Species of moth

Phyllonorycter mariaeella is a moth of the family Gracillariidae. It is known from Canada (Québec and Ontario) and the United States (Missouri and Michigan).

The wingspan is 8-8.5 mm.

The larvae feed on Symphoricarpos species, including Symphoricarpos orbiculatus, Symphoricarpos symphoricarpos and Symphoricarpos vulgaris. They mine the leaves of their host plant.
