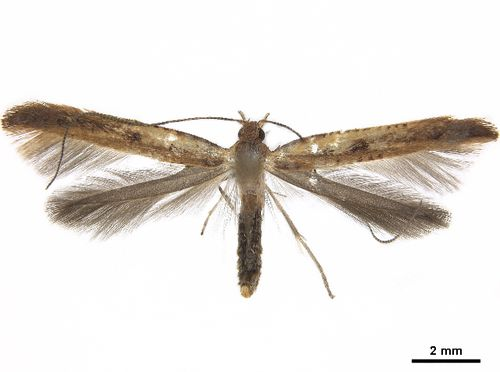

Scientific classification
- Kingdom: Animalia
- Phylum: Arthropoda
- Clade: Pancrustacea
- Class: Insecta
- Order: Lepidoptera
- Family: Gracillariidae
- Genus: Caloptilia
- Species: C. pulchella

Binomial name
- Caloptilia pulchella (Chambers, 1875)

= Caloptilia pulchella =

Species of moth

Caloptilia pulchella is a moth of the family Gracillariidae. It is known from Canada (Nova Scotia and Québec) the United States (Vermont).

The larvae feed on Alnus incana and Alnus rugosa. They mine the leaves of their host plant.
