= Stigmella braunella =

Scientific classification
- Kingdom: Animalia
- Phylum: Arthropoda
- Clade: Pancrustacea
- Class: Insecta
- Order: Lepidoptera
- Family: Nepticulidae
- Genus: Stigmella
- Species: S. braunella

Binomial name
- Stigmella braunella (W. W. Jones, 1933)

Synonyms
- Nepticula braunella W. W. Jones, 1933

Species of moth

Stigmella braunella is a moth of the family Nepticulidae which is endemic to California. The species was first described by W. W. Jones in 1933.

The wingspan is 5.4–6.6 millimetres (0.21–0.26 in). There are two generations per year with late-instar larvae being encountered throughout the year.

The larvae, commonly called the Catalina Cherry Leaf Miner, feed on Prunus ilicifolia. They mine the leaves of their host plant.
