= Phyllonorycter intermixta =

Scientific classification
- Domain: Eukaryota
- Kingdom: Animalia
- Phylum: Arthropoda
- Class: Insecta
- Order: Lepidoptera
- Family: Gracillariidae
- Genus: Phyllonorycter
- Species: P. intermixta

Binomial name
- Phyllonorycter intermixta (Braun, 1930)

Species of moth

Phyllonorycter intermixta is a moth of the family Gracillariidae. It is known from Québec in Canada and Connecticut, Ohio, Rhode Island and Vermont in the United States.

The larvae feed on Corylus americana. They mine the leaves of their host plant.
