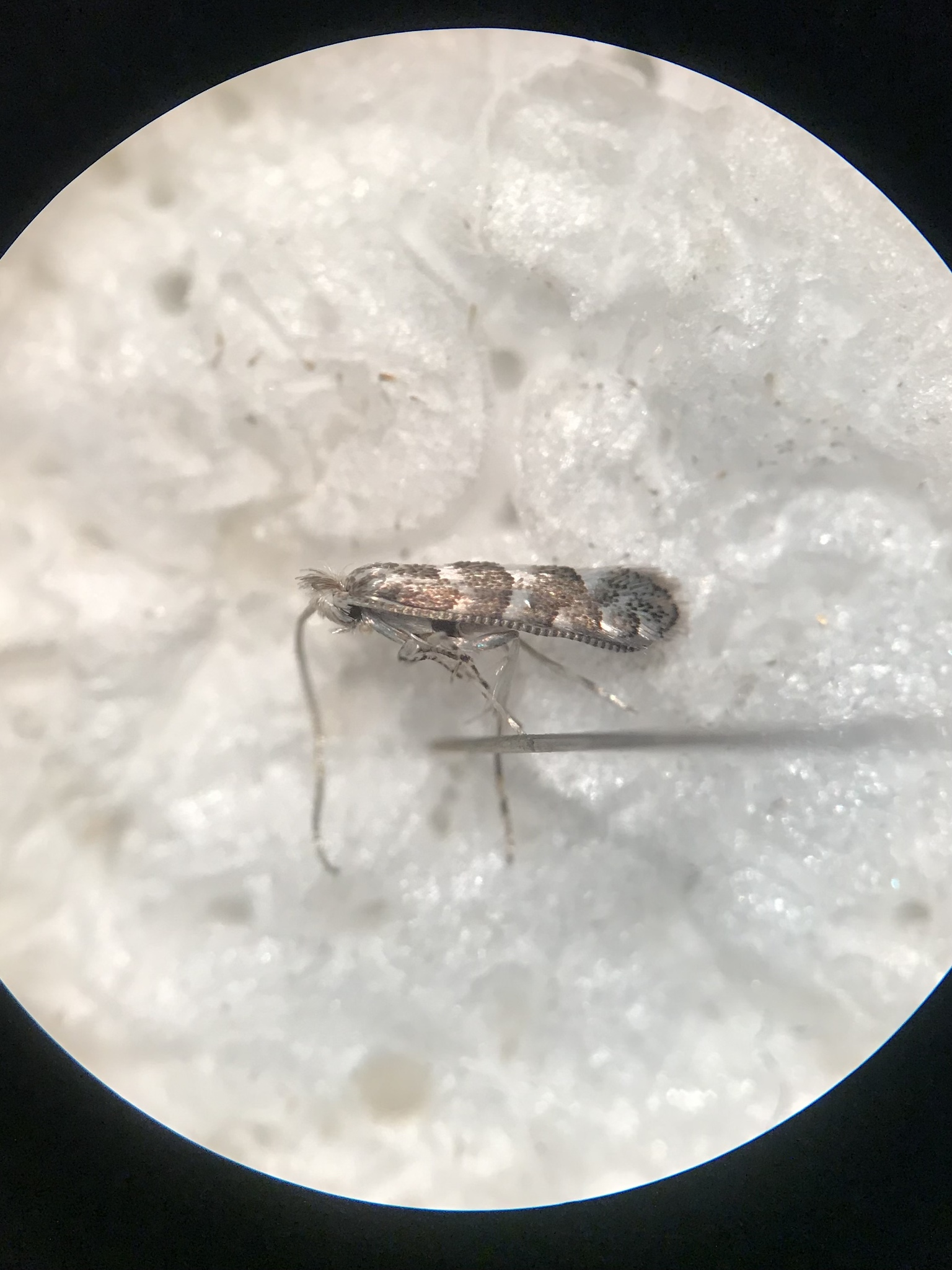

Scientific classification
- Kingdom: Animalia
- Phylum: Arthropoda
- Clade: Pancrustacea
- Class: Insecta
- Order: Lepidoptera
- Family: Gracillariidae
- Genus: Phyllonorycter
- Species: P. bataviella

Binomial name
- Phyllonorycter bataviella (Braun, 1908)

Synonyms
- Lithocolletis bataviella Braun, 1908

= Phyllonorycter bataviella =

Species of moth

Phyllonorycter bataviella is a species of moth in the family Gracillariidae. It is known from the United States (Illinois, Ohio, Maine and Michigan).

The wingspan is 7-7.5 mm.

The larvae feed on oak species. They mine the leaves of their host plant.
