= Phyllonorycter antiochella =

Scientific classification
- Kingdom: Animalia
- Phylum: Arthropoda
- Class: Insecta
- Order: Lepidoptera
- Family: Gracillariidae
- Genus: Phyllonorycter
- Species: P. antiochella

Binomial name
- Phyllonorycter antiochella (Opler, 1971)

Species of moth

Phyllonorycter antiochella is a moth of the family Gracillariidae. It is known from California, United States.

The larvae feed on Quercus agrifolia. They mine the leaves of their host plant.
