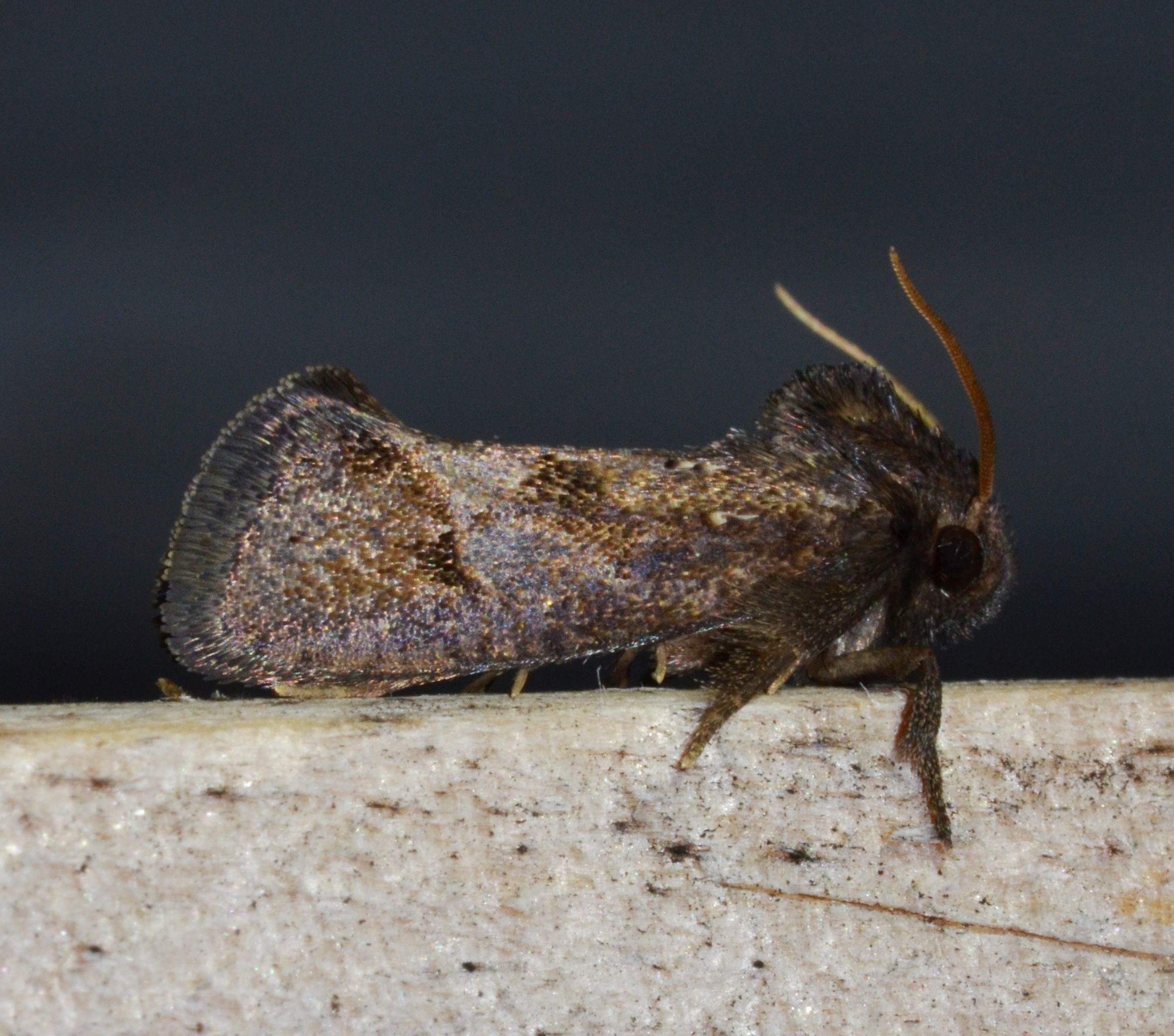

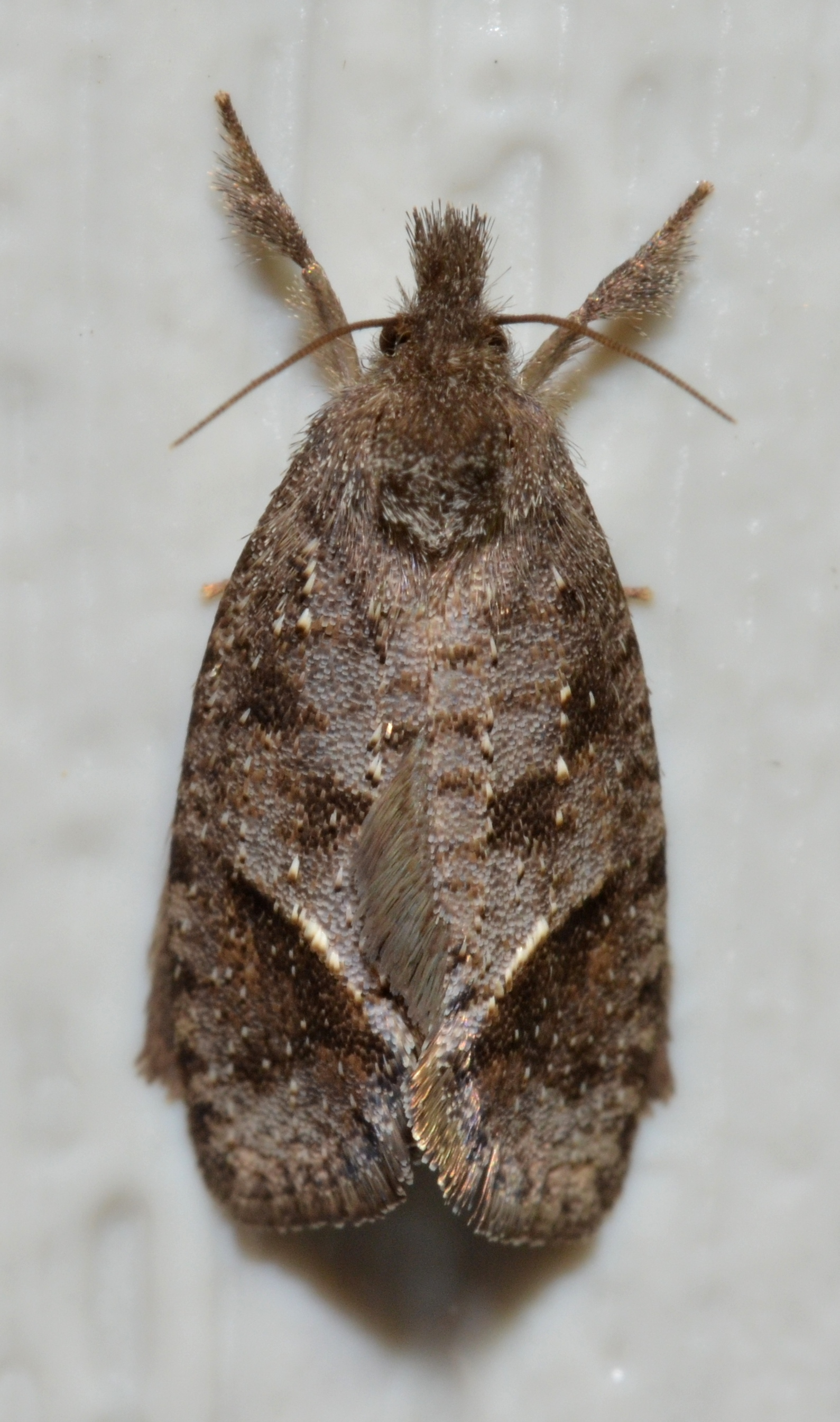

Scientific classification
- Kingdom: Animalia
- Phylum: Arthropoda
- Clade: Pancrustacea
- Class: Insecta
- Order: Lepidoptera
- Family: Tineidae
- Genus: Acrolophus
- Species: A. texanella

Binomial name
- Acrolophus texanella (Chambers, 1878)

Synonyms
- Anaphora texanella Chambers, 1878; Acrolophus hulstellus Beutenmüller, 1887; Atopocera barnesii Dyar, 1900

= Acrolophus texanella =

Species of moth

Acrolophus texanella (grass tubeworm or Texas grass tubeworm moth) is a moth of the family Acrolophidae. It is found from Maryland to Florida and to Texas.

The wingspan is about 20 mm.
