= Stigmella belfrageella =

Scientific classification
- Kingdom: Animalia
- Phylum: Arthropoda
- Clade: Pancrustacea
- Class: Insecta
- Order: Lepidoptera
- Family: Nepticulidae
- Genus: Stigmella
- Species: S. belfrageella

Binomial name
- Stigmella belfrageella (Chambers, 1875)

Synonyms
- Nepticula belfrageella Chambers, 1875

Species of moth

Stigmella belfrageella is a moth of the family Nepticulidae which is endemic to Texas.

The wingspan is 6.25–6.50 millimetres (0.246–0.256 in). Adults have been found in April.
