= Stigmella plumosetaeella =

Scientific classification
- Kingdom: Animalia
- Phylum: Arthropoda
- Clade: Pancrustacea
- Class: Insecta
- Order: Lepidoptera
- Family: Nepticulidae
- Genus: Stigmella
- Species: S. plumosetaeella

Binomial name
- Stigmella plumosetaeella Newton & Wilkinson, 1982

Species of moth

Stigmella plumosetaeella is a species of moth in the family Nepticulidae. It is found in Arizona, USA, and Tamaulipas, Mexico.

The wingspan is 3.8–3.9 millimetres (0.150–0.154 in).
