= Acrocercops astericola =

Scientific classification
- Kingdom: Animalia
- Phylum: Arthropoda
- Clade: Pancrustacea
- Class: Insecta
- Order: Lepidoptera
- Family: Gracillariidae
- Genus: Acrocercops
- Species: A. astericola

Binomial name
- Acrocercops astericola (Frey & Boll, 1873)

Species of insect

Acrocercops astericola is a moth of the family Gracillariidae, known from Canada (Québec and Nova Scotia) and the United States (Pennsylvania, Kentucky, Maine, Michigan, Vermont, Massachusetts and New York).
