= Stigmella alba =

Scientific classification
- Kingdom: Animalia
- Phylum: Arthropoda
- Clade: Pancrustacea
- Class: Insecta
- Order: Lepidoptera
- Family: Nepticulidae
- Genus: Stigmella
- Species: S. alba

Binomial name
- Stigmella alba Wilkinson & Scoble, 1979

Species of moth

Stigmella alba is a moth of the family Nepticulidae. In North America it has been recorded from Arizona and British Columbia.
