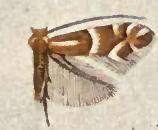

Scientific classification
- Kingdom: Animalia
- Phylum: Arthropoda
- Class: Insecta
- Order: Lepidoptera
- Family: Gracillariidae
- Genus: Phyllonorycter
- Species: P. martiella

Binomial name
- Phyllonorycter martiella (Braun, 1908)

Synonyms
- Lithocolletis martiella Braun, 1908

= Phyllonorycter martiella =

Species of moth

Phyllonorycter martiella is a moth of the family Gracillariidae. It is known from British Columbia, Nova Scotia and Québec in Canada and from Maine, Michigan, North Carolina, Vermont and Kentucky in the United States.

The wingspan is about 6.8 mm.

The larvae feed on Betula species, including Betula lenta. They mine the leaves of their host plant.
