= Caloptilia minimella =

Scientific classification
- Domain: Eukaryota
- Kingdom: Animalia
- Phylum: Arthropoda
- Class: Insecta
- Order: Lepidoptera
- Family: Gracillariidae
- Genus: Caloptilia
- Species: C. minimella

Binomial name
- Caloptilia minimella (Ely, 1915)

Species of moth

Caloptilia minimella is a moth of the family Gracillariidae. It is known from Connecticut, Illinois and Maine in the United States.

The larvae feed on Gymnanthes lucida. They mine the leaves of their host plant.
