= Caloptilia sebastianiella =

Scientific classification
- Domain: Eukaryota
- Kingdom: Animalia
- Phylum: Arthropoda
- Class: Insecta
- Order: Lepidoptera
- Family: Gracillariidae
- Genus: Caloptilia
- Species: C. sebastianiella

Binomial name
- Caloptilia sebastianiella (Busck, 1900)

Synonyms
- Caloptilia sebastianella (Dyar, 1903)

Species of moth

Caloptilia sebastianiella is a moth of the family Gracillariidae. It is known from Florida, United States.

The larvae feed on Gymnanthes lucida and Sebastiana fruticosa. They mine the leaves of their host plant. The mine has the form of a brown, irregular, elongated upper blotch-mine, with the upper epidermis drawn into a longitudinal ridge.
