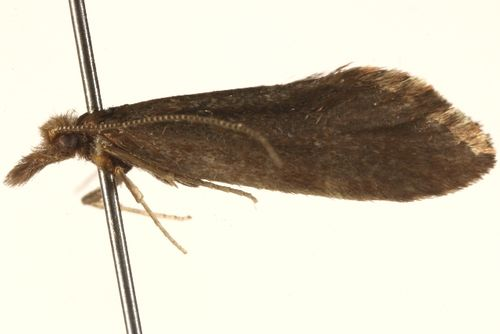

Scientific classification
- Kingdom: Animalia
- Phylum: Arthropoda
- Clade: Pancrustacea
- Class: Insecta
- Order: Lepidoptera
- Family: Tineidae
- Genus: Phryganeopsis; Walsingham, 1881
- Species: P. brunnea

Binomial name
- Phryganeopsis brunnea Walsingham, 1881

Synonyms
- Genus: Setonella McDunnough, 1927; Species: Setonella buscki McDunnough, 1927

= Phryganeopsis =

Genus of moths

Phryganeopsis is a genus of moths belonging to the family Tineidae. It contains only one species, Phryganeopsis brunnea, which is found in California.
