= Caloptilia palustriella =

Scientific classification
- Domain: Eukaryota
- Kingdom: Animalia
- Phylum: Arthropoda
- Class: Insecta
- Order: Lepidoptera
- Family: Gracillariidae
- Genus: Caloptilia
- Species: C. palustriella

Binomial name
- Caloptilia palustriella (Braun, 1910)

Species of moth

Caloptilia palustriella is a moth of the family Gracillariidae. It is known from California, United States.

The larvae feed on Salix species, including Salix lasiolepis. They mine the leaves of their host plant.
