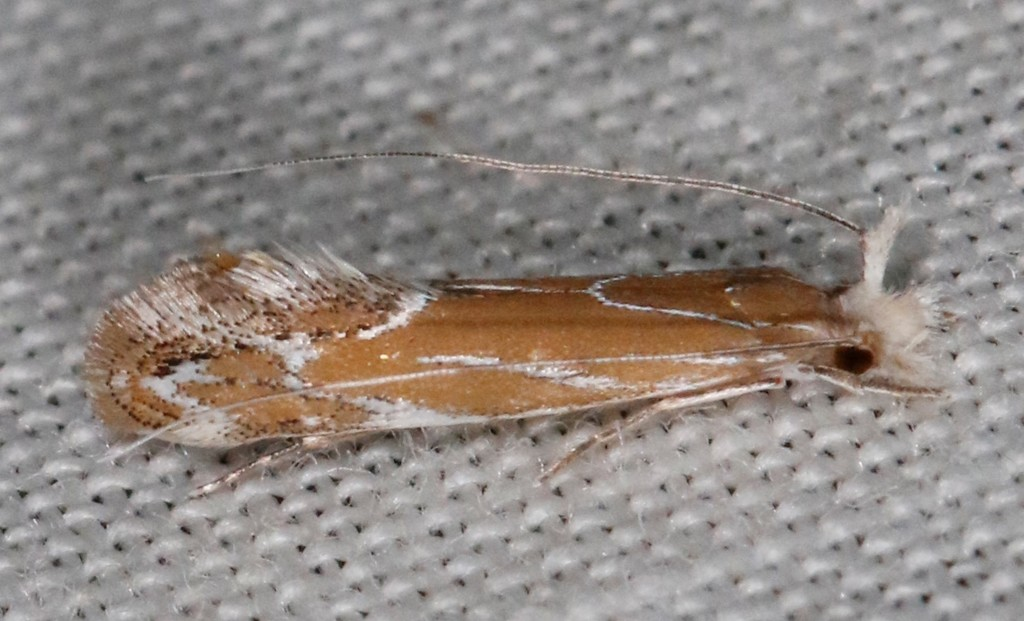

Scientific classification
- Kingdom: Animalia
- Phylum: Arthropoda
- Clade: Pancrustacea
- Class: Insecta
- Order: Lepidoptera
- Family: Tineidae
- Genus: Euprora; Busck, 1906
- Species: E. argentiliniella

Binomial name
- Euprora argentiliniella Busck, 1906

Synonyms
- Euprora argentilineella

= Euprora =

Genus of moths

Euprora is a moth genus, belonging to the family Tineidae. It contains only one species, Euprora argentiliniella, which is found in the southern parts of the United States, including Texas and Florida.

The wingspan is about 17 mm. The forewings are golden ochreous with silvery white markings. The hindwings are shining, dark ochreous fuscous. Adults can be distinguished by the large white tufts on their antennae and palpi.
