= Stigmella villosella =

Scientific classification
- Kingdom: Animalia
- Phylum: Arthropoda
- Clade: Pancrustacea
- Class: Insecta
- Order: Lepidoptera
- Family: Nepticulidae
- Genus: Stigmella
- Species: S. villosella

Binomial name
- Stigmella villosella (Clemens, 1861)

Synonyms
- Nepticula villosella Clemens, 1862; Nepticula dallasiana Frey & Boll, 1876

Species of moth

Stigmella villosella is a moth of the family Nepticulidae. It is found in the United States in Texas, Ohio, Kentucky and Pennsylvania.

The wingspan is 2.8-4.6 mm.
