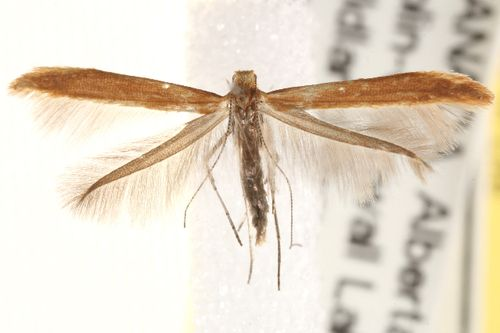

Scientific classification
- Kingdom: Animalia
- Phylum: Arthropoda
- Clade: Pancrustacea
- Class: Insecta
- Order: Lepidoptera
- Family: Gracillariidae
- Genus: Caloptilia
- Species: C. flavella

Binomial name
- Caloptilia flavella (Ely, 1915)

= Caloptilia flavella =

Species of moth

Caloptilia flavella is a moth of the family Gracillariidae. It is known from Canada (Nova Scotia and Québec) and the United States (Connecticut, Maine and Vermont).

The larvae feed on Myrica caroliniensis, Myrica cerifera and Myrica gale. They mine the leaves of their host plant.
