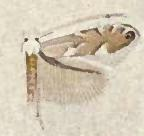

Scientific classification
- Domain: Eukaryota
- Kingdom: Animalia
- Phylum: Arthropoda
- Class: Insecta
- Order: Lepidoptera
- Family: Gracillariidae
- Genus: Phyllonorycter
- Species: P. olivaeformis

Binomial name
- Phyllonorycter olivaeformis (Braun, 1908)

Synonyms
- Lithocolletis olivaeformis Braun, 1908; Phyllonorycter oliviformis (Meyrick, 1912)

= Phyllonorycter olivaeformis =

Species of moth

Phyllonorycter olivaeformis is a moth of the family Gracillariidae. It is known from Maine, New York and Ohio in the United States.

The wingspan is about 6.5 mm.

The larvae feed on Carya illinoinensis. They mine the leaves of their host plant.
