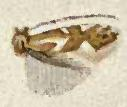

Scientific classification
- Kingdom: Animalia
- Phylum: Arthropoda
- Clade: Pancrustacea
- Class: Insecta
- Order: Lepidoptera
- Family: Gracillariidae
- Genus: Phyllonorycter
- Species: P. deceptusella

Binomial name
- Phyllonorycter deceptusella (Chambers, 1879)

Synonyms
- Lithocolletis deceptusella Chambers, 1879; Phyllonorycter deceptella (Meyrick, 1912); Phyllonorycter deceptisella (Hagen, 1884)

= Phyllonorycter deceptusella =

Species of moth

Phyllonorycter deceptusella is a moth in the family Gracillariidae. It is known Kentucky and Maine in the United States.

The wingspan is about 6 mm.

The larvae feed on Crataegus species. They mine the leaves of their host plant.
