= Stigmella pomivorella =

Scientific classification
- Kingdom: Animalia
- Phylum: Arthropoda
- Clade: Pancrustacea
- Class: Insecta
- Order: Lepidoptera
- Family: Nepticulidae
- Genus: Stigmella
- Species: S. pomivorella

Binomial name
- Stigmella pomivorella (Packard, 1870)

Synonyms
- Micropteryx pomivorella Packard, 1870; Nepticula pomivorella (Packard, 1870)

Species of moth

Stigmella pomivorella is a moth of the family Nepticulidae. It is found in New York, Washington, Massachusetts, Nova Scotia, Ontario and British Columbia.

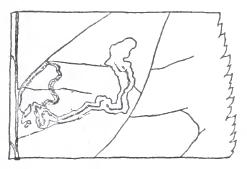
Mine

The wingspan is about 5 millimetres (0.20 in).

The larvae feed on Rosaceae species. They mine the leaves of their host plant.
