= Stigmella scintillans =

Scientific classification
- Kingdom: Animalia
- Phylum: Arthropoda
- Clade: Pancrustacea
- Class: Insecta
- Order: Lepidoptera
- Family: Nepticulidae
- Genus: Stigmella
- Species: S. scintillans

Binomial name
- Stigmella scintillans (Braun, 1917)

Synonyms
- Nepticula scintillans Braun, 1917

Species of moth

Stigmella scintillans is a moth of the family Nepticulidae. It is found in North America in Ohio, Michigan and Ontario.

Mine

There are usually two generations per year. Second-generation larvae are found in July and early August. These normally overwinter. At times, a third generation occurs, with larvae in late August.

The larvae feed on Crataegus species, including Crataegus mollis. They mine the leaves of their host plant.
