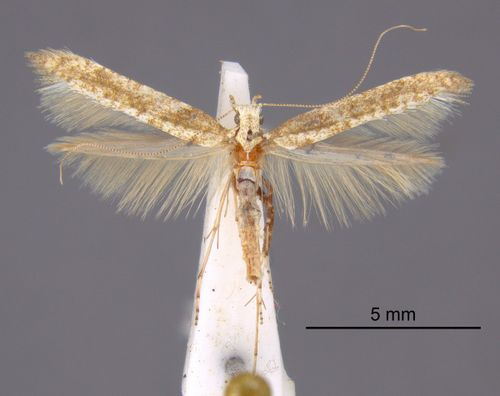

Scientific classification
- Kingdom: Animalia
- Phylum: Arthropoda
- Clade: Pancrustacea
- Class: Insecta
- Order: Lepidoptera
- Family: Gracillariidae
- Genus: Caloptilia
- Species: C. paradoxum

Binomial name
- Caloptilia paradoxum (Frey & Boll, 1873)

Synonyms
- Coriscum paradoxum Frey & Boll, 1873; Caloptilia paradoxa Meyrick, 1912

= Caloptilia paradoxum =

Species of moth

Caloptilia paradoxum is a moth of the family Gracillariidae. It is known from the United States (including Florida, Maine, Massachusetts, Michigan, Pennsylvania, South Carolina and Texas).
