= Phyllonorycter memorabilis =

Scientific classification
- Domain: Eukaryota
- Kingdom: Animalia
- Phylum: Arthropoda
- Class: Insecta
- Order: Lepidoptera
- Family: Gracillariidae
- Genus: Phyllonorycter
- Species: P. memorabilis

Binomial name
- Phyllonorycter memorabilis (Braun, 1939)

Species of moth

Phyllonorycter memorabilis is a moth of the family Gracillariidae. It is known from California, United States.

The larvae feed on Lathyrus species. They mine the leaves of their host plant.
