= Stigmella scinanella =

Scientific classification
- Kingdom: Animalia
- Phylum: Arthropoda
- Clade: Pancrustacea
- Class: Insecta
- Order: Lepidoptera
- Family: Nepticulidae
- Genus: Stigmella
- Species: S. scinanella

Binomial name
- Stigmella scinanella Wilkinson & Scoble, 1979

Species of moth

Stigmella scinanella is a moth of the family Nepticulidae. It is found in Ontario, Canada.

The larvae feed on Malus species. They mine the leaves of their host plant.
