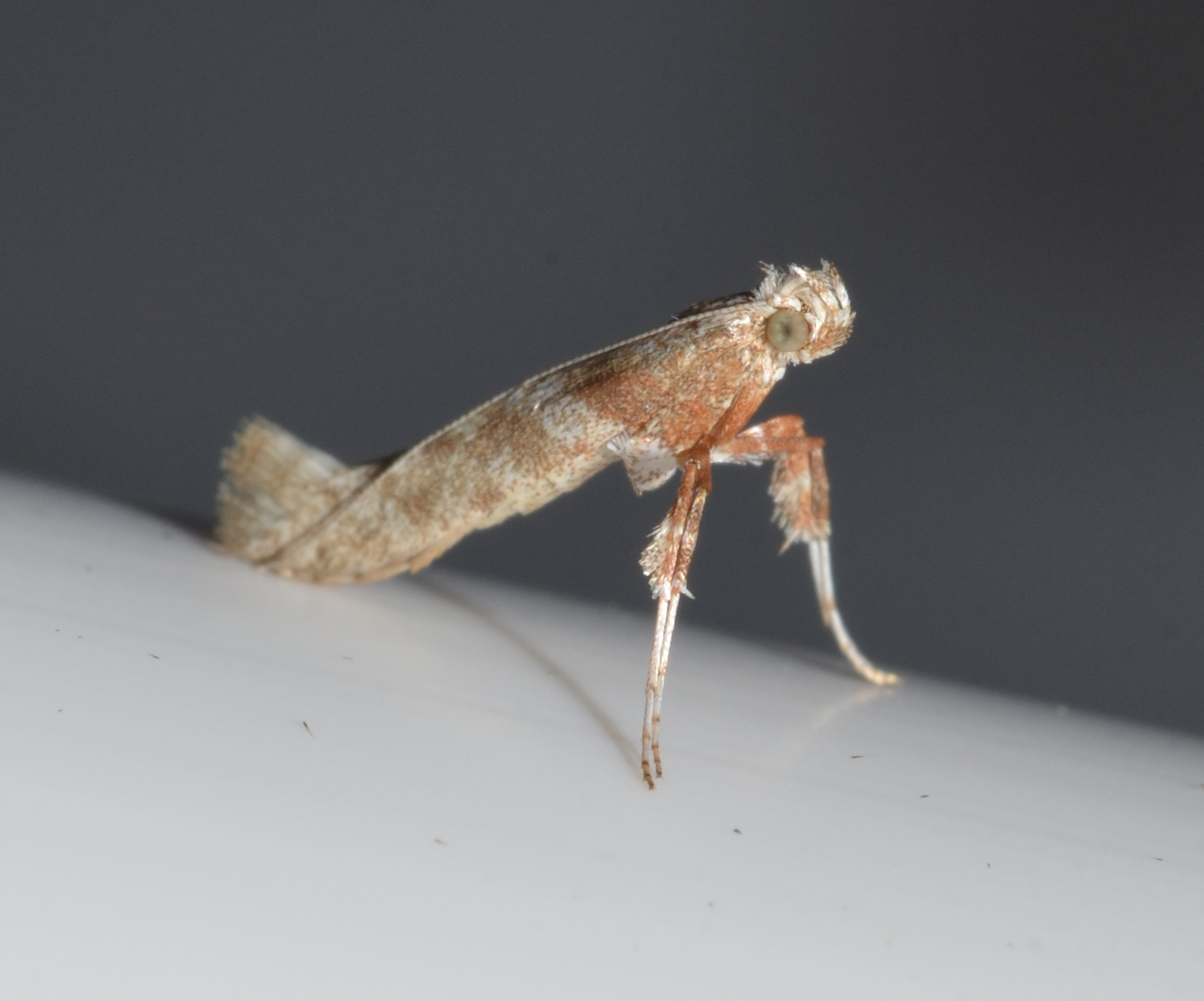

Scientific classification
- Domain: Eukaryota
- Kingdom: Animalia
- Phylum: Arthropoda
- Class: Insecta
- Order: Lepidoptera
- Family: Gracillariidae
- Genus: Caloptilia
- Species: C. quercinigrella

Binomial name
- Caloptilia quercinigrella (Ely, 1915)

Synonyms
- Gracilaria quercinigrella Ely, 1915; Povolnya quercinigrella (Ely, 1915)

= Caloptilia quercinigrella =

Species of moth

Caloptilia quercinigrella or Povolnya quercinigrella is a moth of the family Gracillariidae. It is widely distributed in eastern North America in the United States (south to Florida and Texas) and Canada (Ontario).

The wingspan is about 10 mm. In North Carolina, adults are active in March–April. The larvae feed on Quercus species, including Quercus nigra. They mine the leaves of their host plant.
