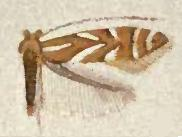

Scientific classification
- Domain: Eukaryota
- Kingdom: Animalia
- Phylum: Arthropoda
- Class: Insecta
- Order: Lepidoptera
- Family: Gracillariidae
- Genus: Phyllonorycter
- Species: P. ledella

Binomial name
- Phyllonorycter ledella (Walsingham, 1889)

Synonyms
- Lithocolletis ledella Walsingham, 1889

= Phyllonorycter ledella =

Species of moth

Phyllonorycter ledella is a moth of the family Gracillariidae. It is known from Québec, Canada, and California, United States. The species is listed as endangered in Connecticut.

The wingspan is 9–10 mm.

The larvae feed on Rhododendron columbianum. They mine the leaves of their host plant.
