= Acrolophus pseudohirsutus =

Scientific classification
- Domain: Eukaryota
- Kingdom: Animalia
- Phylum: Arthropoda
- Class: Insecta
- Order: Lepidoptera
- Family: Tineidae
- Genus: Acrolophus
- Species: A. pseudohirsutus

Binomial name
- Acrolophus pseudohirsutus Hasbrouck, 1964

Synonyms
- Acrolophus hirsutus Busck, 1912; Acrolophus pseudonoma Meyrick, 1922

Species of moth

Acrolophus pseudohirsutus is a moth of the family Acrolophidae. It was described by Hasbrouck in 1964. It is found in North America, including California and Arizona. It is also found in Brazil.
