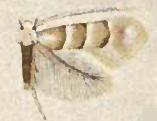

Scientific classification
- Kingdom: Animalia
- Phylum: Arthropoda
- Clade: Pancrustacea
- Class: Insecta
- Order: Lepidoptera
- Family: Gracillariidae
- Genus: Phyllonorycter
- Species: P. tiliacella

Binomial name
- Phyllonorycter tiliacella (Chambers, 1871)

Synonyms
- Lithocolletis tiliacella Chambers, 1871; Phyllonorycter tiliaeella (Chambers, 1871); Phyllonorycter tilieacella (Dyar, 1903); Phyllonorycter tiliella (Walsingham, 1889); Phyllonorycter tilliaeella (Chambers, 1878)

= Phyllonorycter tiliacella =

Species of moth

Phyllonorycter tiliacella is a moth of the family Gracillariidae. It is known from Canada (Québec and Ontario) and the United States (including Illinois, Kentucky, New York, Maine, Vermont and Connecticut).

The larvae feed on Tilia species, including Tilia americana. They mine the leaves of their host plant. The mine has the form of a tentiform mine on upperside leaf. The mine is white and densely speckled with dark brown. The pupa of the summer brood is suspended in a very slight silken web, in the brood remaining through the winter in the pupal state, a denser cocoon is spun, which is attached above and below.
