= Acrocercops rhombiferellum =

Scientific classification
- Kingdom: Animalia
- Phylum: Arthropoda
- Clade: Pancrustacea
- Class: Insecta
- Order: Lepidoptera
- Family: Gracillariidae
- Genus: Acrocercops
- Species: A. rhombiferellum

Binomial name
- Acrocercops rhombiferellum (Frey & Boll, 1876)

Synonyms
- Acrocercops rhombiferella Meyrick, 1912

Species of moth

Acrocercops rhombiferellum is a moth of the family Gracillariidae. It is known from the United States (Texas).
