= Stigmella myricafoliella =

Scientific classification
- Kingdom: Animalia
- Phylum: Arthropoda
- Clade: Pancrustacea
- Class: Insecta
- Order: Lepidoptera
- Family: Nepticulidae
- Genus: Stigmella
- Species: S. myricafoliella

Binomial name
- Stigmella myricafoliella (Busck, 1900)

Synonyms
- Nepticula myricafoliella Busck, 1900

Species of moth

Stigmella myricafoliella is a moth of the family Nepticulidae. It has been recorded in North America from Florida and Nova Scotia.

Mine

The wingspan is 5-5.2 mm.

The larvae feed on Myrica species. They mine the leaves of their host plant. The mine begins on the upper side as a short serpentine track, but soon broadens out in a large irregular blotch, often obliterating the early part of the mine. The frass is black and scattered. When full grown, the larva is 4.5–5 mm long, cylindrical and somewhat flattened. The color is white, with light-brown mandibles and two small black lateral spots on the first thoracic segment. Pupation takes place in a hammock outside of the mine on the leaf in a glistening white oblong cocoon spun under an equally showy white bridgework of longitudinal silken bands. One leaf often contains several mines.
