= Caloptilia melanocarpae =

Scientific classification
- Domain: Eukaryota
- Kingdom: Animalia
- Phylum: Arthropoda
- Class: Insecta
- Order: Lepidoptera
- Family: Gracillariidae
- Genus: Caloptilia
- Species: C. melanocarpae

Binomial name
- Caloptilia melanocarpae (Braun, 1925)

Species of moth

Caloptilia melanocarpae is a moth of the family Gracillariidae. It is known from Quebec, Canada, and Utah and California in the United States.

The larvae feed on Prunus melanocarpa and Prunus virginiana. They mine the leaves of their host plant.
