= Stigmella argentifasciella =

Scientific classification
- Kingdom: Animalia
- Phylum: Arthropoda
- Clade: Pancrustacea
- Class: Insecta
- Order: Lepidoptera
- Family: Nepticulidae
- Genus: Stigmella
- Species: S. argentifasciella

Binomial name
- Stigmella argentifasciella (Braun, 1912)

Synonyms
- Nepticula argentifasciella Braun, 1912

Species of moth

Stigmella argentifasciella is a moth of the family Nepticulidae. It is found in Ohio, Kentucky and Illinois.

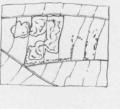
Mine

The wingspan is 3.6–4.8 millimetres (0.14–0.19 in). There are two or possibly three generations per year. Full-grown larvae have been collected in June, August and September.

The larvae feed on Tilia americana. They mine the leaves of their host plant.
