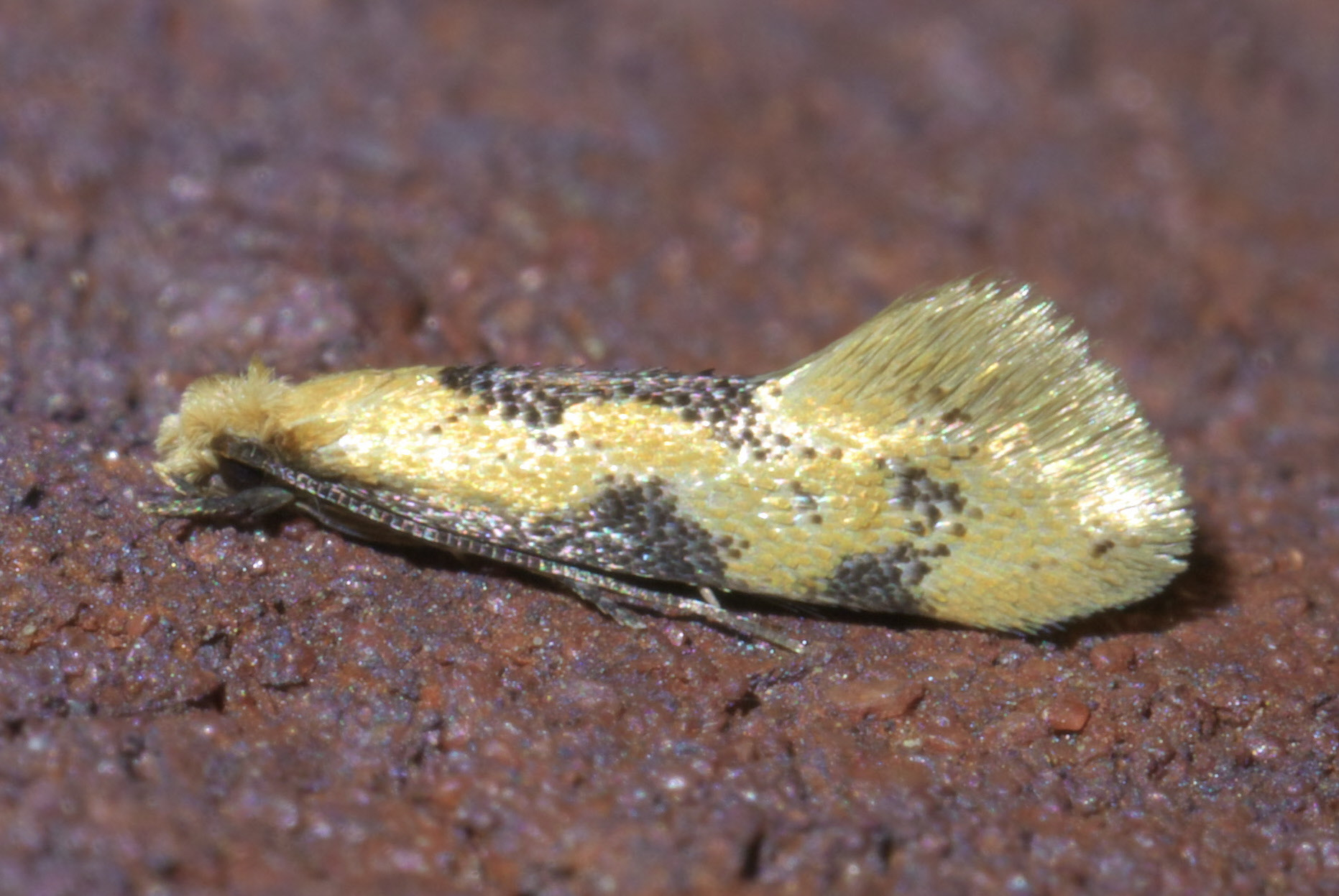
- Hybroma servulella

Scientific classification
- Kingdom: Animalia
- Phylum: Arthropoda
- Clade: Pancrustacea
- Class: Insecta
- Order: Lepidoptera
- Family: Tineidae
- Genus: Hybroma

= Hybroma =

Genus of moths

Hybroma is a genus of moths belonging to the family Tineidae, that have a yellow and black pattern.
