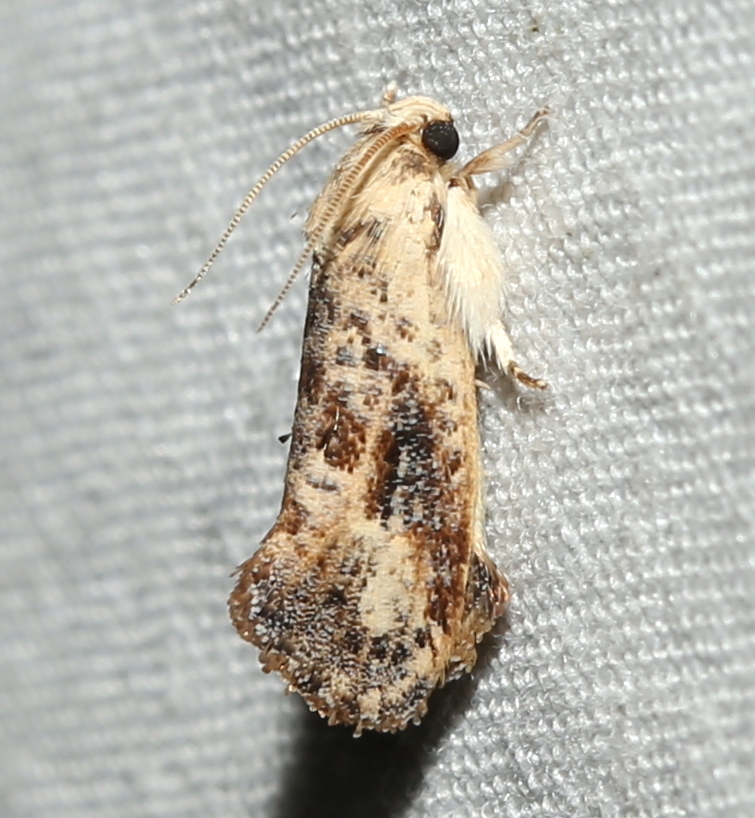

Scientific classification
- Kingdom: Animalia
- Phylum: Arthropoda
- Class: Insecta
- Order: Lepidoptera
- Family: Tineidae
- Genus: Acrolophus
- Species: A. mycetophagus

Binomial name
- Acrolophus mycetophagus Davis, 1990

= Acrolophus mycetophagus =

Frilly grass tubeworm moth

Species of moth

Acrolophus mycetophagus, commonly known as the frilly grass tubeworm moth, is a moth of the family Acrolophidae. It was described by Donald R. Davis in 1990. It is found in the southern United States from Virginia and Florida to Texas.

The wingspan is 16–17 mm (0.63–0.67 in).

The larvae are thought to feed on fungi.
