= Acrolophus pholeter =

Scientific classification
- Kingdom: Animalia
- Phylum: Arthropoda
- Class: Insecta
- Order: Lepidoptera
- Family: Tineidae
- Genus: Acrolophus
- Species: A. pholeter

Binomial name
- Acrolophus pholeter Davis, 1988

Species of moth

Acrolophus pholeter is a moth of the family Acrolophidae. It was described by Donald R. Davis in 1988. It is found in North America, including Florida. Larvae have been reported to feed on animal fecal matter, particularly that of tortoises.
