= Stigmella heteromelis =

Scientific classification
- Kingdom: Animalia
- Phylum: Arthropoda
- Clade: Pancrustacea
- Class: Insecta
- Order: Lepidoptera
- Family: Nepticulidae
- Genus: Stigmella
- Species: S. heteromelis

Binomial name
- Stigmella heteromelis Newton & Wilkinson, 1982

Species of moth

Stigmella heteromelis is a moth of the family Nepticulidae. It is found in California, United States.

The wingspan is 5-6.5 mm.

The larvae feed on Heteromeles species, including Heteromeles arbutifolia. They mine the leaves of their host plant.
