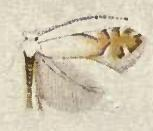

Scientific classification
- Kingdom: Animalia
- Phylum: Arthropoda
- Clade: Pancrustacea
- Class: Insecta
- Order: Lepidoptera
- Family: Gracillariidae
- Genus: Phyllonorycter
- Species: P. clemensella

Binomial name
- Phyllonorycter clemensella (Chambers, 1871)

Synonyms
- Lithocolletis clemensella Chambers, 1871; Phyllonorycter clemensiella (Hagen, 1884); Phyllonorycter demensella Kuznetzov & Baryshnikova, 2004

= Phyllonorycter clemensella =

Species of moth

Phyllonorycter clemensella is a moth of the family Gracillariidae. It is known from Québec in Canada and Illinois, Kentucky, New York, Ohio, Maine, Connecticut and Michigan in the United States.
