= Caloptilia asplenifoliatella =

Scientific classification
- Kingdom: Animalia
- Phylum: Arthropoda
- Clade: Pancrustacea
- Class: Insecta
- Order: Lepidoptera
- Family: Gracillariidae
- Genus: Caloptilia
- Species: C. asplenifoliatella

Binomial name
- Caloptilia asplenifoliatella (Darlington, 1949)

Species of moth

Caloptilia asplenifoliatella is a moth of the family Gracillariidae. It is known from Nova Scotia and the United States (New Jersey).

The larvae feed on Comptonia peregrina and Myrica gale. They mine the leaves of their host plant.
