= Stigmella cerea =

Scientific classification
- Kingdom: Animalia
- Phylum: Arthropoda
- Clade: Pancrustacea
- Class: Insecta
- Order: Lepidoptera
- Family: Nepticulidae
- Genus: Stigmella
- Species: S. cerea

Binomial name
- Stigmella cerea (Braun, 1917)

Synonyms
- Nepticula cerea Braun, 1917

Species of moth

Stigmella cerea is a moth of the family Nepticulidae. It is found in Ohio and Pennsylvania in the United States.

The wingspan is 3.5–3.6 mm.
