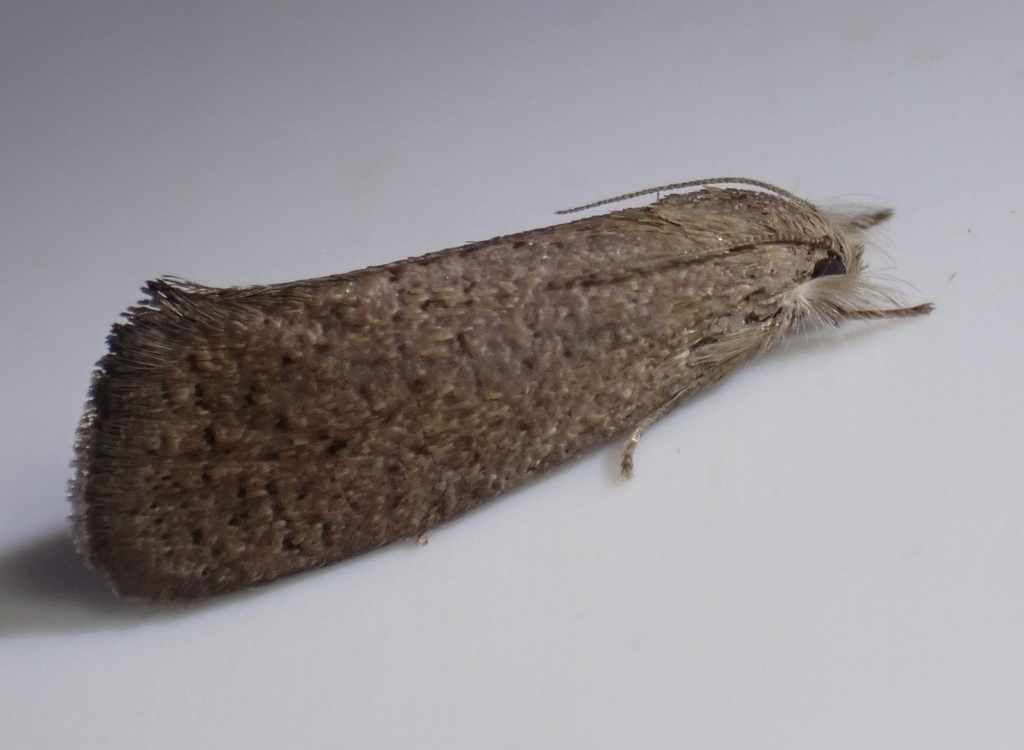

Scientific classification
- Kingdom: Animalia
- Phylum: Arthropoda
- Clade: Pancrustacea
- Class: Insecta
- Order: Lepidoptera
- Family: Tineidae
- Genus: Acrolophus
- Species: A. spilotus

Binomial name
- Acrolophus spilotus Davis, 1990

= Acrolophus spilotus =

Species of moth

Acrolophus spilotus is a moth of the family Acrolophidae. It was described by Donald R. Davis in 1990.

== Distribution ==
It is found in North America, including Alabama, Florida, Mississippi and Texas.

The wingspan is about 16 mm.
