= Stigmella taeniola =

Scientific classification
- Kingdom: Animalia
- Phylum: Arthropoda
- Clade: Pancrustacea
- Class: Insecta
- Order: Lepidoptera
- Family: Nepticulidae
- Genus: Stigmella
- Species: S. taeniola

Binomial name
- Stigmella taeniola (Braun, 1925)

Synonyms
- Nepticula taeniola Braun, 1925

Species of moth

Stigmella taeniola is a moth of the family Nepticulidae. It is found in Utah and Idaho in the United States.

The wingspan is about 5.2 mm.

The larvae feed on Amelanchier alnifolia. They mine the leaves of their host plant.
