= Stigmella crataegifoliella =

Scientific classification
- Kingdom: Animalia
- Phylum: Arthropoda
- Clade: Pancrustacea
- Class: Insecta
- Order: Lepidoptera
- Family: Nepticulidae
- Genus: Stigmella
- Species: S. crataegifoliella

Binomial name
- Stigmella crataegifoliella (Clemens, 1861)

Synonyms
- Nepticula crataegifoliella Clemens, 1862

Species of moth

Stigmella crataegifoliella is a moth of the family Nepticulidae. It is found in North America in Ohio, Pennsylvania, Kentucky and Ontario.

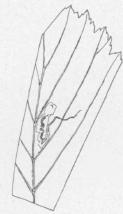
Mine

The wingspan is 3.5-4.5 mm. Adults are on wing in May and again in August in Ohio. There are two generations per year.
