= Phyllonorycter erugatus =

Scientific classification
- Kingdom: Animalia
- Phylum: Arthropoda
- Class: Insecta
- Order: Lepidoptera
- Family: Gracillariidae
- Genus: Phyllonorycter
- Species: P. erugatus

Binomial name
- Phyllonorycter erugatus Davis & Deschka, 2001

Species of moth

Phyllonorycter erugatus is a moth of the family Gracillariidae. It is known in the United States from widely scattered localities from Santa Clara County near sea level in mid-coastal California north to southern Alaska and west to the Rocky Mountains of Colorado to elevations of 2,800 meters.

The length of the forewings is 3.7-4.8 mm. Adults are on wing from late July to early October. There might be two generations per year in the southern part of the range.

The larvae feed on Populus balsamifera and possibly other Populus species. They mine the leaves of their host plant.
