= Stigmella juglandifoliella =

Scientific classification
- Kingdom: Animalia
- Phylum: Arthropoda
- Clade: Pancrustacea
- Class: Insecta
- Order: Lepidoptera
- Family: Nepticulidae
- Genus: Stigmella
- Species: S. juglandifoliella

Binomial name
- Stigmella juglandifoliella (Clemens, 1861)

Synonyms
- Nepticula juglandifoliella Clemens, 1862

Species of moth

The pecan serpentine leafminer (Stigmella juglandifoliella) is a moth of the family Nepticulidae. It is found in Ohio, Pennsylvania and Kentucky in the United States.

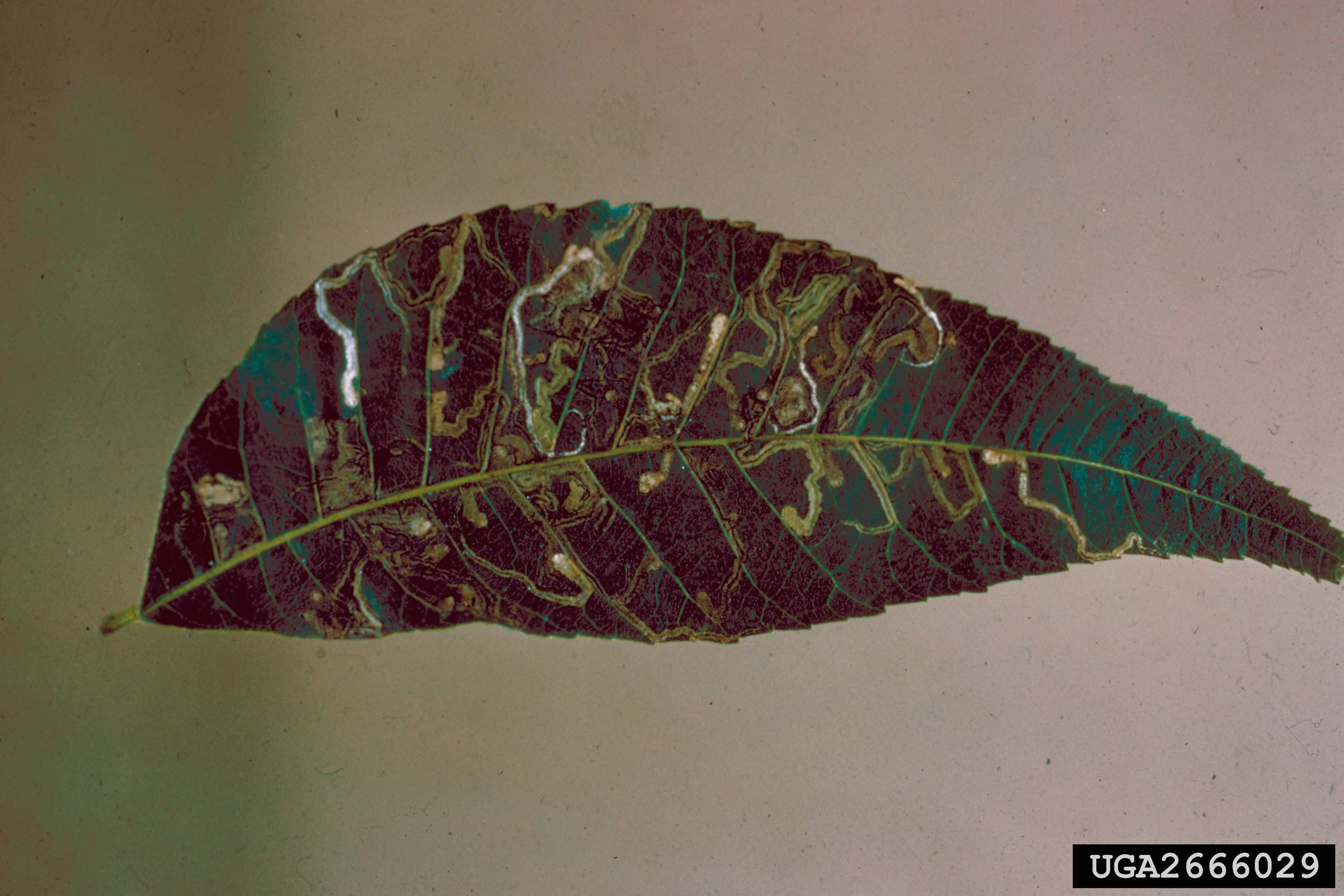
Stigmella juglandifoliella mine

The wingspan is 3.5-3.8 mm. There are probably two generations per year.

The larvae feed on Carya illinoinensis (pecan). They mine the leaves of their host plant.

== General references ==
Common name: Pecan serpentine leafminer.

- The Leafminers of Pecan - Pecan South Magazine
- Management of the Pecan Serpentine Leafminer (Lepidoptera: Nepticulidae) - Journal of Economic Entomology, Volume 78, Issue 5, 1 October 1985, Pages 1121–1124
- Leafminer, shuckworm pests target New Mexico pecans 264240 - Western Farm Press
- Pecan Serpentine Leafminer Moth- Maryland Biodiversity Project
