= Stigmella castaneaefoliella =

Scientific classification
- Kingdom: Animalia
- Phylum: Arthropoda
- Clade: Pancrustacea
- Class: Insecta
- Order: Lepidoptera
- Family: Nepticulidae
- Genus: Stigmella
- Species: S. castaneaefoliella

Binomial name
- Stigmella castaneaefoliella (Chambers, 1875)

Synonyms
- Nepticula castaneaefoliella Chambers, 1875

Species of moth

Stigmella castaneaefoliella is a moth of the family Nepticulidae. It is found in North America in Kentucky, Ohio, Virginia, Illinois, Pennsylvania, New Jersey, Massachusetts, Florida and Ontario. As a caterpillar, the species is a leaf miner of Castanea species.

Mine

The wingspan is 4-4.5 mm.
