= Stigmella nigriverticella =

Scientific classification
- Kingdom: Animalia
- Phylum: Arthropoda
- Clade: Pancrustacea
- Class: Insecta
- Order: Lepidoptera
- Family: Nepticulidae
- Genus: Stigmella
- Species: S. nigriverticella

Binomial name
- Stigmella nigriverticella (Chambers, 1875)

Synonyms
- Nepticula nigriverticella Chambers, 1875; Nepticula maculosella Chambers, 1880

Species of moth

Stigmella nigriverticella is a moth of the family Nepticulidae. It is found in Texas, Cincinnati, Ohio, New York, Arkansas, Pennsylvania and Kentucky in the United States.

The wingspan is 4.4-5.2 mm. There are probably three generations per year.

Specimens have been taken on the trunk of wild cherry but there is no other evidence to verify that this is the host plant.
