= Stigmella purpuratella =

Scientific classification
- Kingdom: Animalia
- Phylum: Arthropoda
- Clade: Pancrustacea
- Class: Insecta
- Order: Lepidoptera
- Family: Nepticulidae
- Genus: Stigmella
- Species: S. purpuratella

Binomial name
- Stigmella purpuratella (Braun, 1917)

Synonyms
- Nepticula purpuratella Braun, 1917

Species of moth

Stigmella purpuratella is a moth of the family Nepticulidae. It is found in Pennsylvania, United States.

The wingspan is 4.2-4.4 mm.

The immature stages and host plants are unknown.
