= Caloptilia agrifoliella =

Scientific classification
- Kingdom: Animalia
- Phylum: Arthropoda
- Clade: Pancrustacea
- Class: Insecta
- Order: Lepidoptera
- Family: Gracillariidae
- Genus: Caloptilia
- Species: C. agrifoliella

Binomial name
- Caloptilia agrifoliella Opler, 1971

Species of moth

Caloptilia agrifoliella is a moth of the family Gracillariidae. It is known from the United States (California). The larvae feed on Quercus agrifolia. They mine the leaves of their host plant.
