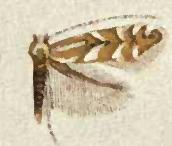

Scientific classification
- Kingdom: Animalia
- Phylum: Arthropoda
- Clade: Pancrustacea
- Class: Insecta
- Order: Lepidoptera
- Family: Gracillariidae
- Genus: Phyllonorycter
- Species: P. alnicolella

Binomial name
- Phyllonorycter alnicolella (Walsingham, 1889)

Synonyms
- Lithocolletis alnicolella Walsingham, 1889

= Phyllonorycter alnicolella =

Species of moth

Phyllonorycter alnicolella is a moth of the family Gracillariidae. It is known California and Maine in the United States and Ontario and Quebec in Canada.

The wingspan is about 6 mm.

The larvae feed on Alnus incana. They mine the leaves of their host plant.
