= Caloptilia aceriella =

Scientific classification
- Kingdom: Animalia
- Phylum: Arthropoda
- Clade: Pancrustacea
- Class: Insecta
- Order: Lepidoptera
- Family: Gracillariidae
- Genus: Caloptilia
- Species: C. aceriella

Binomial name
- Caloptilia aceriella (Chambers, 1881)

Species of moth

Caloptilia aceriella is a moth of the family Gracillariidae. It is known from the United States (Massachusetts, California and Maine).

The larvae feed on Acer species, including Acer rubrum. They mine the leaves of their host plant.
