= Stigmella sclerostyla =

Scientific classification
- Kingdom: Animalia
- Phylum: Arthropoda
- Clade: Pancrustacea
- Class: Insecta
- Order: Lepidoptera
- Family: Nepticulidae
- Genus: Stigmella
- Species: S. sclerostyla

Binomial name
- Stigmella sclerostyla Newton & Wilkinson, 1982

Species of moth

Stigmella sclerostyla is a moth of the family Nepticulidae. It is found in North America in Arkansas and Ontario.

The wingspan is 4-4.4 mm. Adults are on wing in mid-June and early July. There are possibly two generations per year.
