= Phyllonorycter restrictella =

Scientific classification
- Domain: Eukaryota
- Kingdom: Animalia
- Phylum: Arthropoda
- Class: Insecta
- Order: Lepidoptera
- Family: Gracillariidae
- Genus: Phyllonorycter
- Species: P. restrictella

Binomial name
- Phyllonorycter restrictella (Braun, 1939)

Species of moth

Phyllonorycter restrictella is a moth of the family Gracillariidae. It is known from Québec in Canada and New York, Maine, Connecticut, Vermont, Pennsylvania and Michigan in the United States.

The larvae feed on Castanea dentata, Fagus grandifolia and Fagus sylvatica. They mine the leaves of their host plant.
