= Caloptilia betulivora =

Scientific classification
- Domain: Eukaryota
- Kingdom: Animalia
- Phylum: Arthropoda
- Class: Insecta
- Order: Lepidoptera
- Family: Gracillariidae
- Genus: Caloptilia
- Species: C. betulivora

Binomial name
- Caloptilia betulivora (McDunnough, 1946)

Species of moth

Caloptilia betulivora is a moth of the family Gracillariidae. It is known from Canada (Nova Scotia and Québec) the United States.

The larvae feed on Betula species, including Betula alleghaniensis, Betula papyrifera and Betula populifolia. They mine the leaves of their host plant.
