= Phyllonorycter lysimachiaeella =

Scientific classification
- Kingdom: Animalia
- Phylum: Arthropoda
- Clade: Pancrustacea
- Class: Insecta
- Order: Lepidoptera
- Family: Gracillariidae
- Genus: Phyllonorycter
- Species: P. lysimachiaeella

Binomial name
- Phyllonorycter lysimachiaeella (Chambers, 1875)

Synonyms
- Lithocolletis lysimachiaeella Chambers, 1875

Species of moth

Phyllonorycter lysimachiaeella is a moth of the family Gracillariidae. It is known from Kentucky, Maine and New York in the United States.

The larvae feed on Lysimachia lanceolata. They mine the leaves of their host plant.
