= Caloptilia sauzalitoeella =

Scientific classification
- Kingdom: Animalia
- Phylum: Arthropoda
- Clade: Pancrustacea
- Class: Insecta
- Order: Lepidoptera
- Family: Gracillariidae
- Genus: Caloptilia
- Species: C. sauzalitoeella

Binomial name
- Caloptilia sauzalitoeella (Chambers, 1876)

Synonyms
- Caloptilia sauzalitella (Meyrick, 1912); Caloptilia sauzalitoella (Chambers, 1878)

Species of moth

Caloptilia sauzalitoeella is a moth of the family Gracillariidae. It is known from California, United States.
