= Stigmella procrastinella =

Scientific classification
- Kingdom: Animalia
- Phylum: Arthropoda
- Clade: Pancrustacea
- Class: Insecta
- Order: Lepidoptera
- Family: Nepticulidae
- Genus: Stigmella
- Species: S. procrastinella

Binomial name
- Stigmella procrastinella (Braun, 1927)

Synonyms
- Nepticula procrastinella Braun, 1927

Species of moth

Stigmella procrastinella is a moth of the family Nepticulidae. It is found in North America in Virginia, Maine and Ontario.
