= Caloptilia behrensella =

Scientific classification
- Kingdom: Animalia
- Phylum: Arthropoda
- Clade: Pancrustacea
- Class: Insecta
- Order: Lepidoptera
- Family: Gracillariidae
- Genus: Caloptilia
- Species: C. behrensella

Binomial name
- Caloptilia behrensella (Chambers, 1876)

Species of moth

Caloptilia behrensella is a moth of the family Gracillariidae. It is known from the United States (California).
