= Stigmella condaliafoliella =

Scientific classification
- Kingdom: Animalia
- Phylum: Arthropoda
- Clade: Pancrustacea
- Class: Insecta
- Order: Lepidoptera
- Family: Nepticulidae
- Genus: Stigmella
- Species: S. condaliafoliella

Binomial name
- Stigmella condaliafoliella (Busck, 1900)

Synonyms
- Nepticula condaliafoliella Busck, 1900

Species of moth

Stigmella condaliafoliella is a moth of the family Nepticulidae. It is found in Florida, United States.

The wingspan is 2.8-3.1 mm.

The larvae feed on Condalia ferrea. They mine the leaves of their host plant.
