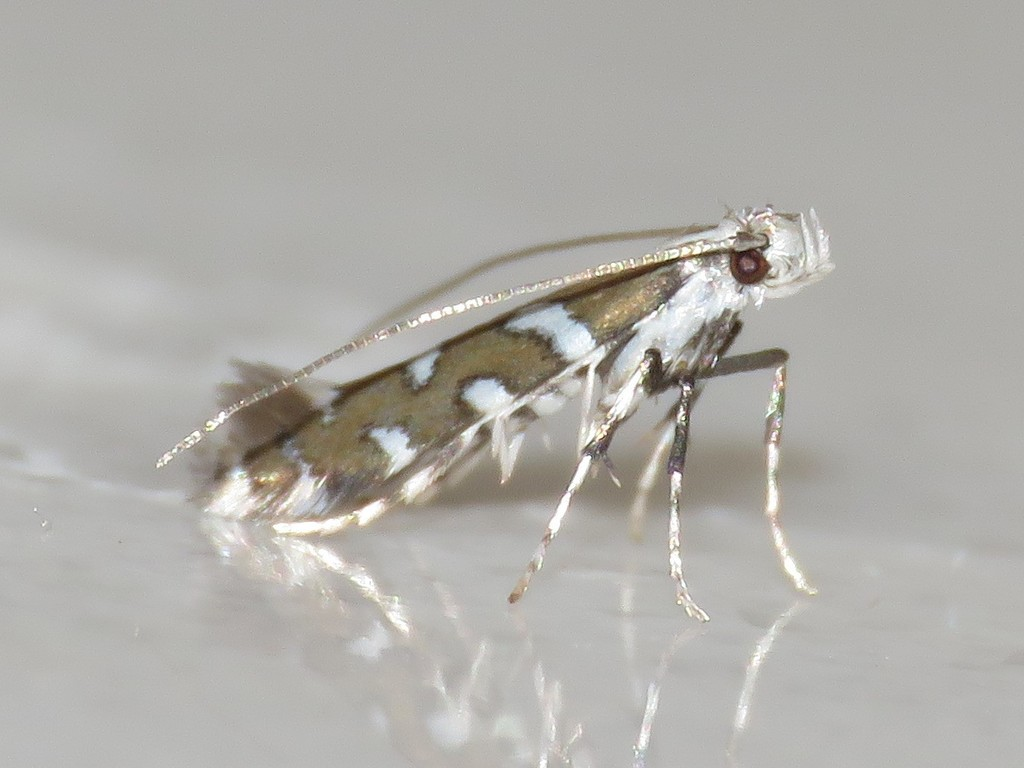

Scientific classification
- Kingdom: Animalia
- Phylum: Arthropoda
- Clade: Pancrustacea
- Class: Insecta
- Order: Lepidoptera
- Family: Gracillariidae
- Genus: Acrocercops
- Species: A. pnosmodiella

Binomial name
- Acrocercops pnosmodiella (Busck, 1902)

Synonyms
- Acrocercops onosmodiella Meyrick, 1912

= Acrocercops pnosmodiella =

Species of moth

Acrocercops pnosmodiella (marbleseed leafminer) is a moth of the family Gracillariidae. It is known from Québec, Canada, and Colorado and California in the United States).

The larvae feed on Onosmodium species, including Onosmodium carolinianum and Onosmodium molle. They mine the leaves of their host plant.
