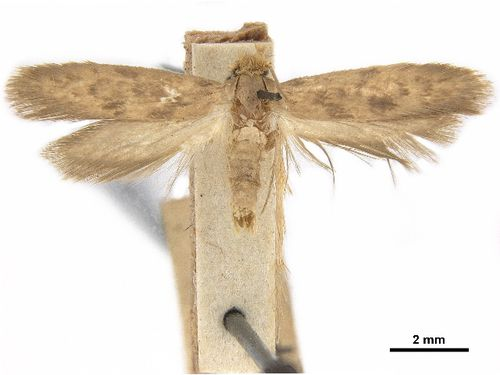

Scientific classification
- Kingdom: Animalia
- Phylum: Arthropoda
- Clade: Pancrustacea
- Class: Insecta
- Order: Lepidoptera
- Family: Tineidae
- Genus: Apreta; W. G. Dietz, 1905
- Species: A. paradoxella

Binomial name
- Apreta paradoxella Dietz, 1905

Synonyms
- Genus: Epichaeta W. G. Dietz, 1905; Species: Epichaeta nepotella Dietz, 1905

= Apreta =

Genus of moths

Apreta is a moth genus, belonging to the family Tineidae. It contains only one species, Apreta paradoxella, which is found in California.
