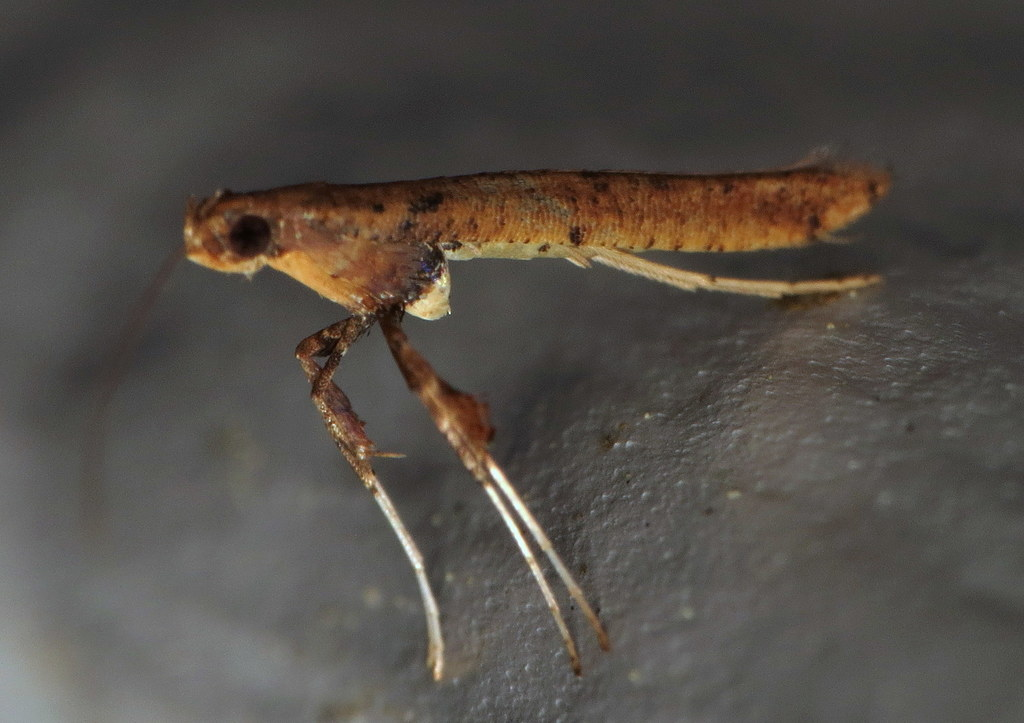

Scientific classification
- Kingdom: Animalia
- Phylum: Arthropoda
- Clade: Pancrustacea
- Class: Insecta
- Order: Lepidoptera
- Family: Gracillariidae
- Genus: Caloptilia
- Species: C. sassafrasella

Binomial name
- Caloptilia sassafrasella (Chambers, 1876)

= Caloptilia sassafrasella =

Species of moth

Caloptilia sassafrasella, the sassafras caloptilia moth, is a moth of the family Gracillariidae. It is known from Canada and the United States (including Connecticut, Florida, Georgia, Maine, Maryland, Missouri, Texas and Kentucky).

The wingspan is about 11 mm.

The larvae feed on Sassafras albidum, Sassafras officinale var. albidum and Sassafras sassafras. They mine the leaves of their host plant. Later instars are found in a downward rolled leaf.
