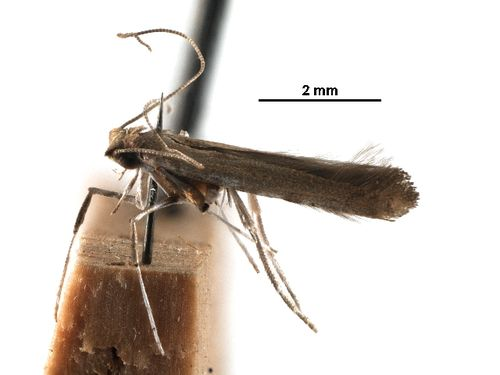

Scientific classification
- Kingdom: Animalia
- Phylum: Arthropoda
- Clade: Pancrustacea
- Class: Insecta
- Order: Lepidoptera
- Family: Gracillariidae
- Genus: Caloptilia
- Species: C. burserella

Binomial name
- Caloptilia burserella (Busck, 1900)

= Caloptilia burserella =

Species of moth

Caloptilia burserella is a moth of the family Gracillariidae. It is known from Cuba and Florida in the United States.

The larvae feed on Bursera gummifera, Bursera simaruba and Persea americana. They mine the leaves of their host plant.
