= Stigmella rosaefoliella =

Scientific classification
- Kingdom: Animalia
- Phylum: Arthropoda
- Clade: Pancrustacea
- Class: Insecta
- Order: Lepidoptera
- Family: Nepticulidae
- Genus: Stigmella
- Species: S. rosaefoliella

Binomial name
- Stigmella rosaefoliella (Clemens, 1861)

Synonyms
- Nepticula rosaefoliella Clemens, 1861

Species of moth

Stigmella rosaefoliella is a moth of the family Nepticulidae. It is found in North America in Ohio, Pennsylvania, Arkansas, New York, Michigan, Missouri and Ontario.

Mine

The wingspan is about 4.5 mm. There are three generations per year with full grown larvae in June and early July, in August and in October.

The larvae feed on Rosa species. They mine the leaves of their host plant.

This species was first described by James Brackenridge Clemens in 1861.

== Subspecies ==
- Stigmella rosaefoliella rosaefoliella (Ohio, Pennsylvania, Arkansas, New York, Michigan, Missouri, Ontario)
- Stigmella rosaefoliella pectocatena (Ontario)
