= Acrolophus crescentella =

Scientific classification
- Domain: Eukaryota
- Kingdom: Animalia
- Phylum: Arthropoda
- Class: Insecta
- Order: Lepidoptera
- Family: Tineidae
- Genus: Acrolophus
- Species: A. crescentella

Binomial name
- Acrolophus crescentella (Kearfott, 1907)

Synonyms
- Amydria crescentella Kearfott, 1907

Species of moth

Acrolophus crescentella is a moth of the family Acrolophidae. It is found in North America, including Arizona.
