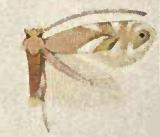

Scientific classification
- Kingdom: Animalia
- Phylum: Arthropoda
- Clade: Pancrustacea
- Class: Insecta
- Order: Lepidoptera
- Family: Gracillariidae
- Genus: Phyllonorycter
- Species: P. sexnotella

Binomial name
- Phyllonorycter sexnotella (Chambers, 1880)

Synonyms
- Lithocolletis sexnotella Chambers, 1880

= Phyllonorycter sexnotella =

Species of moth

Phyllonorycter sexnotella is a moth of the family Gracillariidae. It is known from Kentucky and Pennsylvania in the United States.

The wingspan is 7-7.5 mm.
