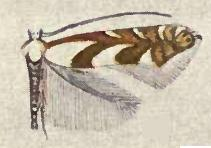

Scientific classification
- Kingdom: Animalia
- Phylum: Arthropoda
- Clade: Pancrustacea
- Class: Insecta
- Order: Lepidoptera
- Family: Gracillariidae
- Genus: Phyllonorycter
- Species: P. hagenii

Binomial name
- Phyllonorycter hagenii (Frey & Boll, 1873)

Synonyms
- Lithocolletis hagenii Frey & Boll, 1873; Phyllonorycter hageni (Chambers, 1878); Phyllonorycter hageni (Dyar, 1903); Phyllonorycter necopinusella (Chambers, 1878); Phyllonorycter necospinusella (Meyrick, 1912); Phyllonorycter necospinusella Dyar, 1903

= Phyllonorycter hagenii =

Species of moth

Phyllonorycter hagenii is a moth of the family Gracillariidae. It is known from Québec in Canada and Illinois, Massachusetts, Kentucky, Michigan, New York, Vermont and Connecticut in the United States.

The wingspan is 7.5–10 mm.

The larvae feed on Quercus species, including Quercus alba, Quercus bicolor, Quercus castanea and Quercus prinus. They mine the leaves of their host plant.
