= Caloptilia obscuripennella =

Scientific classification
- Kingdom: Animalia
- Phylum: Arthropoda
- Clade: Pancrustacea
- Class: Insecta
- Order: Lepidoptera
- Family: Gracillariidae
- Genus: Caloptilia
- Species: C. obscuripennella

Binomial name
- Caloptilia obscuripennella (Frey & Boll, 1876)

Species of moth

Caloptilia obscuripennella is a moth of the family Gracillariidae. It is known from Texas, United States.
