= Phyllonorycter occitanica =

Scientific classification
- Kingdom: Animalia
- Phylum: Arthropoda
- Clade: Pancrustacea
- Class: Insecta
- Order: Lepidoptera
- Family: Gracillariidae
- Genus: Phyllonorycter
- Species: P. occitanica

Binomial name
- Phyllonorycter occitanica (Frey & Boll, 1876)

Synonyms
- Lithocolletis occitanica Frey & Boll, 1876

Species of moth

Phyllonorycter occitanica is a moth of the family Gracillariidae. It is known from Texas, United States.

The larvae feed on Ulmus species, including Ulmus fulva and Ulmus rubra. They mine the leaves of their host plant.
