= Phyllonorycter minutella =

Scientific classification
- Kingdom: Animalia
- Phylum: Arthropoda
- Clade: Pancrustacea
- Class: Insecta
- Order: Lepidoptera
- Family: Gracillariidae
- Genus: Phyllonorycter
- Species: P. minutella

Binomial name
- Phyllonorycter minutella (Frey & Boll, 1878)

Synonyms
- Lithocolletis minutella Frey & Boll, 1878

Species of moth

Phyllonorycter minutella is a moth of the family Gracillariidae. It is known from Texas, United States.

The larvae feed on Quercus rubra. They mine the leaves of their host plant.
