= Calosoma omiltemium =

Scientific classification
- Domain: Eukaryota
- Kingdom: Animalia
- Phylum: Arthropoda
- Class: Insecta
- Order: Coleoptera
- Suborder: Adephaga
- Family: Carabidae
- Genus: Calosoma
- Species: C. omiltemium

Binomial name
- Calosoma omiltemium Bates, 1891

Synonyms
- Calosoma bohnei Korell & Frisch, 2004; Calopachys omiltemius

Species of beetle

Calosoma omiltemium, the omiltemi beautiful thickish searcher, is a species of ground beetle in the subfamily of Carabinae. It was described by Henry Walter Bates in 1891. This species is found in Mexico (Guerrero), where it inhabits rocky soils of volcanic origin beneath forests of Quercus magnolifolia and Quercus castanea.

Adults are brachypterous.
