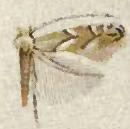

Scientific classification
- Kingdom: Animalia
- Phylum: Arthropoda
- Clade: Pancrustacea
- Class: Insecta
- Order: Lepidoptera
- Family: Gracillariidae
- Genus: Phyllonorycter
- Species: P. diaphanella

Binomial name
- Phyllonorycter diaphanella (Frey & Boll, 1878)

Synonyms
- Lithocolletis diaphanella Frey & Boll, 1878

= Phyllonorycter diaphanella =

Species of moth

Phyllonorycter diaphanella is a moth of the family Gracillariidae. It is known from Texas and Ohio in the United States.

The wingspan is about 6 mm.

The larvae feed on Quercus species, including Quercus bicolor and Quercus ilicifolia. They mine the leaves of their host plant.
