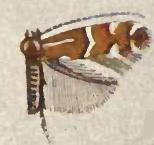

Scientific classification
- Kingdom: Animalia
- Phylum: Arthropoda
- Clade: Pancrustacea
- Class: Insecta
- Order: Lepidoptera
- Family: Gracillariidae
- Genus: Phyllonorycter
- Species: P. gemmea

Binomial name
- Phyllonorycter gemmea (Frey & Boll, 1873)

Synonyms
- Lithocolletis gemmea Frey & Boll, 1873

= Phyllonorycter gemmea =

Species of moth

Phyllonorycter gemmea is a moth of the family Gracillariidae. It is known from Massachusetts and Maine in the United States.

The wingspan is 7-7.5 mm.

The larvae feed on Robinia species, including Robinia pseudacacia. They mine the leaves of their host plant.
