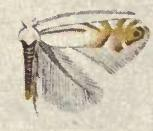

Scientific classification
- Kingdom: Animalia
- Phylum: Arthropoda
- Clade: Pancrustacea
- Class: Insecta
- Order: Lepidoptera
- Family: Gracillariidae
- Genus: Phyllonorycter
- Species: P. argentifimbriella

Binomial name
- Phyllonorycter argentifimbriella (Clemens, 1859)

Synonyms
- Lithocolletis argentifimbriella Clemens, 1859; Phyllonorycter fuscocostella (Chambers, 1875); Phyllonorycter longestriata (Frey & Boll, 1873); Phyllonorycter longirostrata (Dyar, 1903); Phyllonorycter longistriata (Ely, 1818)

= Phyllonorycter argentifimbriella =

Species of moth

Phyllonorycter argentifimbriella is a moth of the family Gracillariidae. It is known from Québec in Canada and Illinois, Kentucky, Pennsylvania, Maine, Maryland, New York, Vermont, Massachusetts, Connecticut and Washington in the United States.

The wingspan is 6.5–7 mm.

The larvae feed on Quercus species, including Quercus alba, Quercus bicolor, Quercus castanea and Quercus prinus. They mine the leaves of their host plant.
