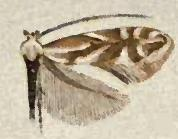

Scientific classification
- Kingdom: Animalia
- Phylum: Arthropoda
- Clade: Pancrustacea
- Class: Insecta
- Order: Lepidoptera
- Family: Gracillariidae
- Genus: Phyllonorycter
- Species: P. scudderella

Binomial name
- Phyllonorycter scudderella (Frey & Boll, 1873)

Synonyms
- Lithocolletis scudderella Frey and Boll, 1873; Lithocolletis salicivorella Braun, 1908; Phyllonorycter salicivorella

= Phyllonorycter scudderella =

Species of moth

Phyllonorycter scudderella is a moth of the family Gracillariidae. It is widespread in eastern North America from Ontario to Ohio and in western North America from south-eastern Alaska to Oregon.

The length of the forewings is 3-4.3 mm. Adults are on wing from mid-March to early May and from late June to early October. There are probably two generations per year.

The larvae feed on Salix babylonica, Salix bebbiana, Salix discolor and Salix candida species. They mine the leaves of their host plant.
