= Phyllonorycter dentifera =

Scientific classification
- Kingdom: Animalia
- Phylum: Arthropoda
- Class: Insecta
- Order: Lepidoptera
- Family: Gracillariidae
- Genus: Phyllonorycter
- Species: P. dentifera

Binomial name
- Phyllonorycter dentifera (Noreika in Noreika and Duplesis, 1992)

Synonyms
- Lithocolletis dentifera Noreika in Noreika and Duplesis, 1992

Species of moth

Phyllonorycter dentifera is a moth of the family Gracillariidae. It is known from Central Asia, southern Tajikistan and Turkmenistan.

The larvae feed on Populus pruinosa. They mine the leaves of their host plant. The mines are found only the upperside of the leaf.
