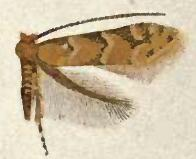

Scientific classification
- Kingdom: Animalia
- Phylum: Arthropoda
- Clade: Pancrustacea
- Class: Insecta
- Order: Lepidoptera
- Family: Gracillariidae
- Genus: Phyllonorycter
- Species: P. fragilella

Binomial name
- Phyllonorycter fragilella (Frey & Boll, 1878)

Synonyms
- Lithocolletis fragilella Frey & Boll, 1878; Phyllonorycter trifasciella (Frey & Boll, 1873)

= Phyllonorycter fragilella =

Species of moth

Phyllonorycter fragilella is a moth of the family Gracillariidae. It is known from Québec in Canada and Texas, Maine, Michigan, New York, Massachusetts, Illinois and Wyoming in the United States.

The wingspan is 8.5–9 mm.

The larvae feed on Lonicera species (including Lonicera sempervirens and Lonicera × bella), Symphoricarpos species (including Symphoricarpos orbiculatus and Symphoricarpos vulgaris) and Chiococca alba. They mine the leaves of their host plant.
