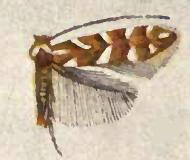

Scientific classification
- Kingdom: Animalia
- Phylum: Arthropoda
- Clade: Pancrustacea
- Class: Insecta
- Order: Lepidoptera
- Family: Gracillariidae
- Genus: Phyllonorycter
- Species: P. auronitens

Binomial name
- Phyllonorycter auronitens (Frey & Boll, 1873)

Synonyms
- Lithocolletis auronitens Frey & Boll, 1873

= Phyllonorycter auronitens =

Species of moth

Phyllonorycter auronitens is a moth of the family Gracillariidae. It is known from Quebec in Canada and Massachusetts, Kentucky, Maine, North Carolina, Vermont and Connecticut in the United States.

The wingspan is 6.5-8.2 mm.

The larvae feed on Alnus species, including Alnus incana, Alnus rubra and Alnus rugosa. They mine the leaves of their host plant.
