= Phyllonorycter pruinosella =

Scientific classification
- Domain: Eukaryota
- Kingdom: Animalia
- Phylum: Arthropoda
- Class: Insecta
- Order: Lepidoptera
- Family: Gracillariidae
- Genus: Phyllonorycter
- Species: P. pruinosella

Binomial name
- Phyllonorycter pruinosella (Gerasimov, 1931)

Synonyms
- Lithocolletis pruinosella Gerasimov, 1931

Species of moth

Phyllonorycter pruinosella is a moth of the family Gracillariidae. It is known from Central Asia, Kazakhstan, Tajikistan, Turkmenistan and Uzbekistan.

The larvae feed on Populus species (including Populus diversifolia, Populus euphratica and Populus pruinosa) and Salix species. They probably mine the leaves of their host plant.
