= Phyllonorycter linifoliella =

Scientific classification
- Domain: Eukaryota
- Kingdom: Animalia
- Phylum: Arthropoda
- Class: Insecta
- Order: Lepidoptera
- Family: Gracillariidae
- Genus: Phyllonorycter
- Species: P. linifoliella

Binomial name
- Phyllonorycter linifoliella (Rungs, 1942)

Synonyms
- Phyllonorycter uniformella (Rungs, 1942)

Species of moth

Phyllonorycter linifoliella is a moth of the family Gracillariidae. It is known from Morocco.

The larvae feed on Teline linifolia. They probably mine the leaves of their host plant.
