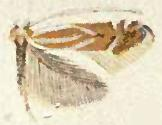

Scientific classification
- Kingdom: Animalia
- Phylum: Arthropoda
- Class: Insecta
- Order: Lepidoptera
- Family: Gracillariidae
- Genus: Phyllonorycter
- Species: P. basistrigella

Binomial name
- Phyllonorycter basistrigella (Clemens, 1859)

Synonyms
- Lithocolletis basistrigella Clemens, 1859; Phyllonorycter intermedia (Frey & Boll, 1873)

= Phyllonorycter basistrigella =

Species of moth

Phyllonorycter basistrigella is a moth of the family Gracillariidae. It is known from Québec in Canada and Connecticut, Illinois, Oregon, Kentucky, Maine, Michigan, New York, Vermont, Pennsylvania, Colorado, Massachusetts, Rhode Island, California and Missouri in the United States.

The wingspan is about 8 mm.

The larvae feed on Quercus species, including Quercus alba, Quercus bicolor, Quercus castanea, Quercus coccinea, Quercus kelloggii, Quercus macrocarpa, Quercus prinoides, Quercus prinus, Quercus rubra, Quercus stellata, Quercus tinctoria and Quercus velutina. They mine the leaves of their host plant. The mine has the form of a tentiform mine on the underside the leaf. The mine lies between two veins and is nearly rectangular in shape and unwrinkled. At the time of pupation, the frass, which has been deposited along the edges of the mine, is collected and made into an oval ring-like wall of the cocoon, leaving the cuticle transparent, through which the pupa is plainly visible. It has also been witnessed on Castanea crenata, with the frass ring resulting in the identification of the species.
