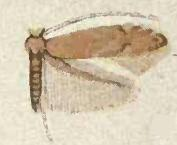

Scientific classification
- Kingdom: Animalia
- Phylum: Arthropoda
- Clade: Pancrustacea
- Class: Insecta
- Order: Lepidoptera
- Family: Gracillariidae
- Genus: Phyllonorycter
- Species: P. obsoleta

Binomial name
- Phyllonorycter obsoleta (Frey & Boll, 1873)

Synonyms
- Lithocolletis obsoleta Frey & Boll, 1873; Phyllonorycter obsoletella (Chambers, 1878)

= Phyllonorycter obsoleta =

Species of moth

Phyllonorycter obsoleta is a moth of the family Gracillariidae. It is known from Massachusetts, United States.

The wingspan is about 8 mm.
