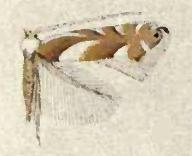

Scientific classification
- Kingdom: Animalia
- Phylum: Arthropoda
- Clade: Pancrustacea
- Class: Insecta
- Order: Lepidoptera
- Family: Gracillariidae
- Genus: Phyllonorycter
- Species: P. fitchella

Binomial name
- Phyllonorycter fitchella (Clemens, 1860)

Synonyms
- Lithocolletis fitchella Clemens, 1860; Phyllonorycter quercetorum (Frey & Boll, 1873); Phyllonorycter quercifoliella (Fitch, 1859); Phyllonorycter quercitorum (Chambers, 1877)

= Phyllonorycter fitchella =

Species of moth

Phyllonorycter fitchella is a moth of the family Gracillariidae. It is known from Québec in Canada and Connecticut, Kentucky, Pennsylvania, Texas, Illinois, New York, California, Florida, Georgia, Maine, Maryland, Michigan, Vermont, Colorado and Missouri in the United States.

The wingspan is 7.5–8 mm. Adults are on wing from March to October in California.

The larvae feed on Quercus species, including Quercus alba, Quercus bicolor, Quercus castanea, Quercus ilicifolia, Quercus macrocarpa, Quercus prinoides, Quercus prinus and Quercus stellata. They mine the leaves of their host plant.
