= Phyllonorycter myricella =

Scientific classification
- Kingdom: Animalia
- Phylum: Arthropoda
- Class: Insecta
- Order: Lepidoptera
- Family: Gracillariidae
- Genus: Phyllonorycter
- Species: P. myricella

Binomial name
- Phyllonorycter myricella Kumata, 1995

Synonyms
- Phyllonorycter myricae Kumata, 1993 (nec Deschka, 1976)

Species of moth

Phyllonorycter myricella is a moth of the family Gracillariidae. It is known from Kedah, Malaysia.

The wingspan is 5.1-5.7 mm.

The larvae feed on Myrica esculenta. They mine the leaves of their host plant.
