= Phyllonorycter tangerensis =

Scientific classification
- Kingdom: Animalia
- Phylum: Arthropoda
- Clade: Pancrustacea
- Class: Insecta
- Order: Lepidoptera
- Family: Gracillariidae
- Genus: Phyllonorycter
- Species: P. tangerensis

Binomial name
- Phyllonorycter tangerensis (Stainton, 1872)

Species of moth

Phyllonorycter tangerensis is a moth of the family Gracillariidae. It is known from Morocco.

The larvae feed on Coronilla species and Teline linifolia. They mine the leaves of their host plant.
