= Phyllonorycter luzonica =

Scientific classification
- Kingdom: Animalia
- Phylum: Arthropoda
- Class: Insecta
- Order: Lepidoptera
- Family: Gracillariidae
- Genus: Phyllonorycter
- Species: P. luzonica

Binomial name
- Phyllonorycter luzonica Kumata, 1995

Species of moth

Phyllonorycter luzonica is a moth of the family Gracillariidae. It is known from Luzon island in the Philippines.

The wingspan is 4.2-4.7 mm.

The larvae feed on Celtis species. They mine the leaves of their host plant.
