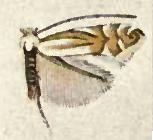

Scientific classification
- Domain: Eukaryota
- Kingdom: Animalia
- Phylum: Arthropoda
- Class: Insecta
- Order: Lepidoptera
- Family: Gracillariidae
- Genus: Phyllonorycter
- Species: P. albanotella

Binomial name
- Phyllonorycter albanotella (Chambers, 1875)

Synonyms
- Lithocolletis albanotella Chambers, 1875; Phyllonorycter albinotella (Meyrick, 1912); Phyllonorycter subaureola (Frey & Boll, 1878)

= Phyllonorycter albanotella =

Species of moth

Phyllonorycter albanotella is a moth of the family Gracillariidae. It is known from Ontario and Québec in Canada and Illinois, Kentucky, Ohio, Texas, Maine, Vermont and Connecticut in the United States.

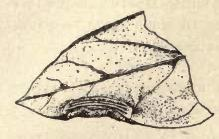
Mine

The wingspan is 6–7.5 mm.

The larvae feed on Quercus species, including Quercus alba, Quercus bicolor, Quercus macrocarpa, Quercus nigra and Quercus obtusiloba. They mine the leaves of their host plant. The mine has the form of a rather small tentiform mine on the underside of the leaf. It is located either at the edge of the leaf or between two veins, the loosened epidermis being thrown into numerous longitudinal wrinkles. The pupa is enclosed in a rather large semi-transparent oval silken cocoon.
