= Phyllonorycter kumatai =

Scientific classification
- Domain: Eukaryota
- Kingdom: Animalia
- Phylum: Arthropoda
- Class: Insecta
- Order: Lepidoptera
- Family: Gracillariidae
- Genus: Phyllonorycter
- Species: P. kumatai

Binomial name
- Phyllonorycter kumatai De Prins & De Prins, 2005

Synonyms
- Phyllonorycter pruni Kumata, 1973

Species of moth

Phyllonorycter kumatai is a moth of the family Gracillariidae. It is known from the Nepal.

The wingspan is 6-6.5 mm.

The larvae feed on Prunus cerasoides. They mine the leaves of their host plant.
