= Phyllonorycter yamadai =

Scientific classification
- Kingdom: Animalia
- Phylum: Arthropoda
- Class: Insecta
- Order: Lepidoptera
- Family: Gracillariidae
- Genus: Phyllonorycter
- Species: P. yamadai

Binomial name
- Phyllonorycter yamadai Kumata, 1973

Species of moth

Phyllonorycter yamadai is a moth of the family Gracillariidae. It is known from Nepal.

The wingspan is 5.5–6 mm.

The larvae feed on Engelhardia spicata. They mine the leaves of their host plant.
