= Phyllonorycter madagascariensis =

Scientific classification
- Kingdom: Animalia
- Phylum: Arthropoda
- Class: Insecta
- Order: Lepidoptera
- Family: Gracillariidae
- Genus: Phyllonorycter
- Species: P. madagascariensis

Binomial name
- Phyllonorycter madagascariensis (Viette, 1949)

Synonyms
- Lithocolletis madagascariensis Viette, 1949

Species of moth

Phyllonorycter madagascariensis is a moth of the family Gracillariidae. It is known from Madagascar.

The forewings are very pale ochreous, golden and marked with two silvery white fascia. The hindwings are equally dark grey dorsally and ventrally. Adults are probably on wing in July and August.
