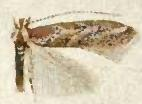

Scientific classification
- Kingdom: Animalia
- Phylum: Arthropoda
- Clade: Pancrustacea
- Class: Insecta
- Order: Lepidoptera
- Family: Gracillariidae
- Genus: Phyllonorycter
- Species: P. celtifoliella

Binomial name
- Phyllonorycter celtifoliella (Chambers, 1871)

Synonyms
- Lithocolletis celtifoliella Chambers, 1871

= Phyllonorycter celtifoliella =

Species of moth

Phyllonorycter celtifoliella is a moth of the family Gracillariidae. It is known from Illinois, Kentucky, Ohio, West Virginia, Florida, Georgia, Maryland and Texas in the United States.

The larvae feed on Celtis species, including Celtis occidentalis. They mine the leaves of their host plant.
