= Phyllonorycter montanella =

Scientific classification
- Domain: Eukaryota
- Kingdom: Animalia
- Phylum: Arthropoda
- Class: Insecta
- Order: Lepidoptera
- Family: Gracillariidae
- Genus: Phyllonorycter
- Species: P. montanella

Binomial name
- Phyllonorycter montanella Bradley, 1980

Species of moth

Phyllonorycter montanella is a moth of the family Gracillariidae. It is known from Pakistan.

The larvae feed on Lonicera quinquelocularis. They mine the leaves of their host plant.
