= Phyllonorycter cinctata =

Scientific classification
- Kingdom: Animalia
- Phylum: Arthropoda
- Class: Insecta
- Order: Lepidoptera
- Family: Gracillariidae
- Genus: Phyllonorycter
- Species: P. cinctata

Binomial name
- Phyllonorycter cinctata Kumata, 1973

Species of moth

Phyllonorycter cinctata is a moth of the family Gracillariidae. It is known from the Nepal.

The wingspan is 7–8 mm.

The larvae feed on Viburnum erubescens. They mine the leaves of their host plant.
