= Phyllonorycter dubiosella =

Scientific classification
- Kingdom: Animalia
- Phylum: Arthropoda
- Clade: Pancrustacea
- Class: Insecta
- Order: Lepidoptera
- Family: Gracillariidae
- Genus: Phyllonorycter
- Species: P. dubiosella

Binomial name
- Phyllonorycter dubiosella (Wocke, 1877)

Synonyms
- Phyllonorycter acaciella (Herrich-Schäffer, 1855)

Species of moth

Phyllonorycter dubiosella is a moth of the family Gracillariidae. It is known from Austria and Bosnia and Herzegovina.
