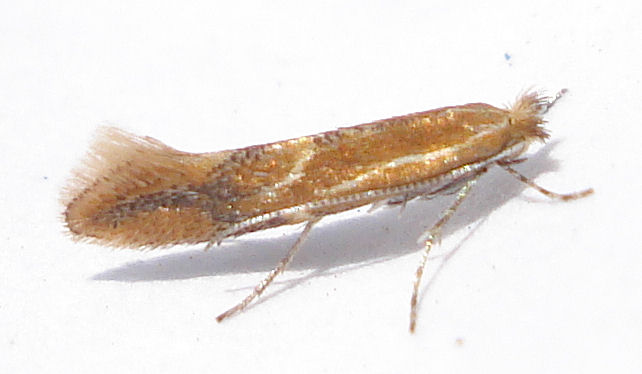
- Phyllonorycter corylifoliella

Scientific classification
- Domain: Eukaryota
- Kingdom: Animalia
- Phylum: Arthropoda
- Class: Insecta
- Order: Lepidoptera
- Family: Gracillariidae
- Genus: Phyllonorycter; Hübner, 1822

Species
- See text

Synonyms
- Lithocolletis Hübner, 1825; Argyromyges J. Curtis 1829; Argyromis Stephens, 1829; Eucestis Hübner, 1825; Hirsuta Bruand, 1851 (unavailable name)

= Phyllonorycter =

Genus of moths

Phyllonorycter is a genus of moths in the family Gracillariidae.

== Diversity ==
The genus comprises about 400 species, with a worldwide distribution. The vast majority of species are found in the temperate regions, with about 257 species described from the Palaearctic region and 81 from the Nearctic. In the tropics, the genus is species-poor, with 36 species described from Indo-Australia, 13 from the Neotropics and 22 from the Afrotropical region. In 2012, a further 27 species were described from the Afrotropics.

== Species ==
- Phyllonorycter aarviki de Prins, 2012
- Phyllonorycter aberrans (Braun, 1930)
- Phyllonorycter abrasella (Duponchel, [1843])
- Phyllonorycter acaciella (Duponchel, 1843)
- Phyllonorycter acanthus Davis & Deschka, 2001
- Phyllonorycter acerifoliella (Zeller, 1839)
- Phyllonorycter aceripestis (Kuznetzov, 1978)
- Phyllonorycter aceriphaga (Kuznetzov, 1975)
- Phyllonorycter achilleus de Prins, 2012
- Phyllonorycter acratynta (Meyrick, 1916)
- Phyllonorycter acutissimae (Kumata, 1963)
- Phyllonorycter acutulus de Prins, 2012
- Phyllonorycter adderis de Prins, 2012
- Phyllonorycter adenocarpi (Staudinger, 1863)
- Phyllonorycter aemula Triberti, Deschka & Huemer, 1997
- Phyllonorycter aeriferella (Clemens, 1859)
- Phyllonorycter agassizi de Prins, 2012
- Phyllonorycter agilella (Zeller, 1846)
- Phyllonorycter aino (Kumata, 1963)
- Phyllonorycter alaskana Deschka, 1982
- Phyllonorycter albanotella (Chambers, 1875)
- Phyllonorycter albertinus de Prins, 2012
- Phyllonorycter albimacula (Walsingham, 1897)
- Phyllonorycter alluaudiella (Chrétien, 1922)
- Phyllonorycter alni (Walsingham, 1891)
- Phyllonorycter alnicolella (Walsingham, 1889)
- Phyllonorycter alnivorella (Ragonot, 1875)
- Phyllonorycter alpina (Frey, 1856)
- Phyllonorycter amseli (Povolný & Gregor, 1955)
- Phyllonorycter anceps Triberti, 2007
- Phyllonorycter anchistea (Vári, 1961)
- Phyllonorycter andalusicus Lastuvka & Lastuvka, 2006
- Phyllonorycter anderidae (W. Fletcher, 1885)
- Phyllonorycter antiochella (Opler, 1971)
- Phyllonorycter antitoxa (Meyrick, 1915)
- Phyllonorycter apicinigrella (Braun, 1908)
- Phyllonorycter apparella (Herrich-Schäffer, 1855)
- Phyllonorycter arbutusella (Braun, 1908)
- Phyllonorycter argentifimbriella (Clemens, 1859)
- Phyllonorycter argentifrontella (Walsingham, 1897)
- Phyllonorycter argentinotella (Clemens, 1859)
- Phyllonorycter argyrolobiella Nel, 2009
- Phyllonorycter arizonella (Braun, 1925)
- Phyllonorycter armeniella (Kuznetzov, 1958)
- Phyllonorycter auronitens (Frey & Boll, 1873)
- Phyllonorycter baetica Lastuvka & Lastuvka, 2006
- Phyllonorycter baldensis Deschka, 1986
- Phyllonorycter barbarella (Rebel, 1901)
- Phyllonorycter bartolomella (Deschka, 1968)
- Phyllonorycter bascanaula (Meyrick, 1936)
- Phyllonorycter basistrigella (Clemens, 1859)
- Phyllonorycter bataviella (Braun, 1908)
- Phyllonorycter belotella (Staudinger, 1859)
- Phyllonorycter bicinctella (Matsumura, 1931)
- Phyllonorycter bifurcata (Kumata, 1967)
- Phyllonorycter blancardella (Fabricius, 1781)
- Phyllonorycter brachylaenae (Vári, 1961)
- Phyllonorycter brunnea Deschka, 1975
- Phyllonorycter caraganella (Ermolaev, 1986)
- Phyllonorycter carpini (Kumata, 1963)
- Phyllonorycter caryaealbella (Chambers, 1871)
- Phyllonorycter caspica Noreika, 1992
- Phyllonorycter caudasimplex Bland, 1980
- Phyllonorycter cavella (Zeller, 1846)
- Phyllonorycter celtidis (Kumata, 1963)
- Phyllonorycter celtifoliella (Chambers, 1871)
- Phyllonorycter celtisella (Chambers, 1871)
- Phyllonorycter cephalariae (Lhomme, 1934)
- Phyllonorycter cerasicolella (Herrich-Schäffer, 1855)
- Phyllonorycter cerasinella (Reutti, 1853)
- Phyllonorycter cerisolella (Peyerimhoff, 1871)
- Phyllonorycter chalcobaphes (Walsingham, 1914)
- Phyllonorycter chiclanella (Staudinger, 1859)
- Phyllonorycter chionopa (Vári, 1961)
- Phyllonorycter christenseni Derra, 1985
- Phyllonorycter chrysella (Constant, 1885)
- Phyllonorycter cinctata Kumata, 1973
- Phyllonorycter cistifoliella (Groschke, 1944)
- Phyllonorycter clemensella (Chambers, 1871)
- Phyllonorycter clepsiphaga (Meyrick, 1922)
- Phyllonorycter clerotoma (Meyrick, 1915)
- Phyllonorycter cocciferella (Mendes, 1910)
- Phyllonorycter comparella (Duponchel, 1843)
- Phyllonorycter comptoniella (Darlington, 1949)
- Phyllonorycter conformis (Meyrick, 1910)
- Phyllonorycter conista (Meyrick, 1911)
- Phyllonorycter connexella (Zeller, 1846)
- Phyllonorycter coryli (Nicelli, 1851)
- Phyllonorycter corylifoliella (Hübner, 1796)
- Phyllonorycter crataegella (Clemens, 1859)
- Phyllonorycter cretaceella (Braun, 1925)
- Phyllonorycter cretata (Kumata, 1957)
- Phyllonorycter crimea Baryshnikova & Budashkin, 2005
- Phyllonorycter cydoniella ([Denis & Schiffermüller], 1775)
- Phyllonorycter cytisella (Rebel, 1896)
- Phyllonorycter cytisifoliae (M. Hering, 1927)
- Phyllonorycter cytisus (Hartig & Amsel, 1952)
- Phyllonorycter dakekanbae (Kumata, 1963)
- Phyllonorycter deceptusella (Chambers, 1879)
- Phyllonorycter deleta (Staudinger, 1880)
- Phyllonorycter delitella (Duponchel, 1843)
- Phyllonorycter dentifera Noreika, 1992
- Phyllonorycter deschkai Triberti, 2007
- Phyllonorycter deschkanus Lastuvka & Lastuvka, 2006
- Phyllonorycter deserticola Davis & Deschka, 2001
- Phyllonorycter diaphanella (Frey & Boll, 1878)
- Phyllonorycter didymopa (Vári, 1961)
- Phyllonorycter distentella (Zeller, 1846)
- Phyllonorycter diversella (Braun, 1916)
- Phyllonorycter dombeyae de Prins, 2012
- Phyllonorycter drepanota (Meyrick, 1928)
- Phyllonorycter dubiosella (Wocke, 1877)
- Phyllonorycter dubitella (Herrich-Schäffer, 1855)
- Phyllonorycter durangensis Deschka, 1982
- Phyllonorycter echinosparti Lastuvka & Lastuvka, 2006
- Phyllonorycter elmaella Doğanlar & Mutuura, 1980
- Phyllonorycter emberizaepenella (Bouché, 1834)
- Phyllonorycter encaeria (Meyrick, 1911)
- Phyllonorycter enchalcoa (Turner, 1939)
- Phyllonorycter endryella (Mann, 1855)
- Phyllonorycter engelhardiae Kumata, 1973
- Phyllonorycter epichares (Meyrick, 1928)
- Phyllonorycter epispila (Meyrick, 1915)
- Phyllonorycter eratantha (Meyrick, 1922)
- Phyllonorycter erinaceae Lastuvka & Lastuvka, 2013
- Phyllonorycter ermani (Kumata, 1963)
- Phyllonorycter erugatus Davis & Deschka, 2001
- Phyllonorycter esperella (Goeze, 1783)
- Phyllonorycter estrela Lastukva & Lastuvka, 2006
- Phyllonorycter etnensis Lastuvka & Lastuvka, 2006
- Phyllonorycter eugregori Lastuvka & Lastuvka, 2006
- Phyllonorycter extincta (Deschka, 1974)
- Phyllonorycter fabaceaella (Kuznetzov, 1978)
- Phyllonorycter fagifolia (Kumata, 1963)
- Phyllonorycter farensis De Prins & De Prins, 2007
- Phyllonorycter fasciformis (Meyrick, 1930)
- Phyllonorycter fitchella (Clemens, 1860)
- Phyllonorycter fiumella (Krone, 1911)
- Phyllonorycter flava Deschka, 1975
- Phyllonorycter fletcheri de Prins, 2012
- Phyllonorycter foliolosi Walsingham, 1907
- Phyllonorycter formosella (Legrand, 1965)
- Phyllonorycter fragilella (Frey & Boll, 1878)
- Phyllonorycter fraxinella (Zeller, 1846)
- Phyllonorycter froelichiella (Zeller, 1839)
- Phyllonorycter fruticosella (Kuznetzov, 1979)
- Phyllonorycter ganodes (Meyrick, 1918)
- Phyllonorycter gato de Prins, 2012
- Phyllonorycter gemmea (Frey & Boll, 1873)
- Phyllonorycter geniculella (Ragonot, 1874)
- Phyllonorycter genistella (Rebel, 1901)
- Phyllonorycter gerasimowi (M. Hering, 1930)
- Phyllonorycter gerfriedi Lastuvka & Lastuvka, 2007
- Phyllonorycter gigas (Kumata, 1963)
- Phyllonorycter ginnalae (Ermolaev, 1981)
- Phyllonorycter gozmanyi De Prins & De Prins, 2007
- Phyllonorycter gracilis Noreika, 1994
- Phyllonorycter graecus Lastuvka & Lastuvka, 2007
- Phyllonorycter grewiaecola (Vári, 1961)
- Phyllonorycter grewiaephilos de Prins, 2012
- Phyllonorycter grewiella (Vári, 1961)
- Phyllonorycter haasi (Rebel, 1901)
- Phyllonorycter hagenii (Frey & Boll, 1873)
- Phyllonorycter hancola (Kumata, 1958)
- Phyllonorycter hapalotoxa (Meyrick, 1921)
- Phyllonorycter harrisella (Linnaeus, 1761)
- Phyllonorycter heegeriella (Zeller, 1846)
- Phyllonorycter helianthemella (Herrich-Schäffer, 1861)
- Phyllonorycter hesperiella (Staudinger, 1859)
- Phyllonorycter hibiscina (Vári, 1961)
- Phyllonorycter hibiscola de Prins, 2012
- Phyllonorycter hikosana (Kumata, 1963)
- Phyllonorycter hilarella (Zetterstedt, 1839)
- Phyllonorycter himalayana Kumata, 1973
- Phyllonorycter hissarella Noreika, 1993
- Phyllonorycter holodisci (Braun, 1939)
- Phyllonorycter hostis Triberti, 2007
- Phyllonorycter humilitatis Kumata, 1973
- Phyllonorycter idolias (Meyrick, 1891)
- Phyllonorycter ilicifoliella (Duponchel, 1843)
- Phyllonorycter incanella (Walsingham, 1889)
- Phyllonorycter incurvata (Meyrick, 1916)
- Phyllonorycter infirma Deschka, 1975
- Phyllonorycter insignis (Walsingham, 1889)
- Phyllonorycter insignitella (Zeller, 1846)
- Phyllonorycter intermixta (Braun, 1930)
- Phyllonorycter inusitatella (Braun, 1925)
- Phyllonorycter iochrysis (Meyrick, 1931)
- Phyllonorycter ipomoellus de Prins, 2012
- Phyllonorycter iranica Deschka, 1979
- Phyllonorycter iriphanes (Meyrick, 1915)
- Phyllonorycter issikii (Kumata, 1963)
- Phyllonorycter iteina (Meyrick, 1918)
- Phyllonorycter jabalshamsi de Prins, 2012
- Phyllonorycter japonica (Kumata, 1963)
- Phyllonorycter jezoniella (Matsumura, 1931)
- Phyllonorycter joannisi (Le Marchand, 1936)
- Phyllonorycter jozanae (Kumata, 1967)
- Phyllonorycter juglandicola (Kuznetzov, 1975)
- Phyllonorycter juglandis (Kumata, 1963)
- Phyllonorycter juncei Walsingham, 1907
- Phyllonorycter junoniella (Zeller, 1846)
- Phyllonorycter kamijoi (Kumata, 1963)
- Phyllonorycter kautziella (Hartig, 1938)
- Phyllonorycter kazuri de Prins, 2012
- Phyllonorycter kearfottella (Braun, 1908)
- Phyllonorycter kisoensis Kumata & Park, 1978
- Phyllonorycter klemannella (Fabricius, 1781)
- Phyllonorycter klimeschiella (Deschka, 1970)
- Phyllonorycter koreana Kumata & Park, 1978
- Phyllonorycter kuhlweiniella (Zeller, 1839)
- Phyllonorycter kumatai De Prins & De Prins, 2005
- Phyllonorycter kurokoi (Kumata, 1963)
- Phyllonorycter kusdasi (Deschka, 1970)
- Phyllonorycter kuznetzovi (Ermolaev, 1982)
- Phyllonorycter laciniatae (Kumata, 1967)
- Phyllonorycter lalagella (Newman, 1856)
- Phyllonorycter lantanae (Vári, 1961)
- Phyllonorycter lantanella (Schrank, 1802)
- Phyllonorycter lapadiella (Krone, 1909)
- Phyllonorycter latus Davis & Deschka, 2001
- Phyllonorycter laurocerasi (Kuznetzov, 1979)
- Phyllonorycter lautella (Zeller, 1846)
- Phyllonorycter ledella (Walsingham, 1889)
- Phyllonorycter lemarchandi (Viette, 1951)
- Phyllonorycter leucaspis Triberti, 2004
- Phyllonorycter leucocorona (Kumata, 1957)
- Phyllonorycter leucographella (Zeller, 1850)
- Phyllonorycter libanotica (Deschka, 1972)
- Phyllonorycter linifoliella (Rungs, 1942)
- Phyllonorycter longispinata (Kumata, 1958)
- Phyllonorycter lonicerae (Kumata, 1963)
- Phyllonorycter loniceriphaga Noreika, 1992
- Phyllonorycter loxozona (Meyrick, 1936)
- Phyllonorycter lucetiella (Clemens, 1859)
- Phyllonorycter lucidicostella (Clemens, 1859)
- Phyllonorycter luzonica Kumata, 1995
- Phyllonorycter lyoniae (Kumata, 1963)
- Phyllonorycter lysimachiaeella (Chambers, 1875)
- Phyllonorycter macedonica (Deschka, 1971)
- Phyllonorycter macrantherella (Kuznetzov, 1961)
- Phyllonorycter maculata (Kumata, 1963)
- Phyllonorycter madagascariensis (Viette, 1949)
- Phyllonorycter maererei de Prins, 2012
- Phyllonorycter maestingella (Müller, 1764)
- Phyllonorycter malayana Kumata, 1993
- Phyllonorycter malella (Gerasimov, 1931)
- Phyllonorycter malicola (Kuznetzov, 1979)
- Phyllonorycter mannii (Zeller, 1846)
- Phyllonorycter manzanita (Braun, 1925)
- Phyllonorycter mariaeella (Chambers, 1875)
- Phyllonorycter martiella (Braun, 1908)
- Phyllonorycter matsudai Kumata, 1986
- Phyllonorycter medicaginella (Gerasimov, 1930)
- Phyllonorycter melacoronis (Kumata, 1963)
- Phyllonorycter melanosparta (Meyrick, 1912)
- Phyllonorycter melhaniae (Vári, 1961)
- Phyllonorycter memorabilis (Braun, 1939)
- Phyllonorycter menaea (Meyrick, 1918)
- Phyllonorycter mespilella (Hübner, 1805)
- Phyllonorycter messaniella (Zeller, 1846)
- Phyllonorycter mida de Prins, 2012
- Phyllonorycter mildredae Davis & Deschka, 2001
- Phyllonorycter millierella (Staudinger, 1871)
- Phyllonorycter minutella (Frey & Boll, 1878)
- Phyllonorycter mirbeckifoliae Deschka, 1974
- Phyllonorycter mongolicae (Kumata, 1963)
- Phyllonorycter monspessulanella (Fuchs, 1897)
- Phyllonorycter montanella Bradley, 1980
- Phyllonorycter muelleriella (Zeller, 1839)
- Phyllonorycter mwatawalai de Prins, 2012
- Phyllonorycter myricae Deschka, 1976
- Phyllonorycter myricella Kumata, 1995
- Phyllonorycter nepalensis Kumata, 1973
- Phyllonorycter nevadensis Walsingham, 1908
- Phyllonorycter nicellii (Stainton, 1851)
- Phyllonorycter nigrescentella (Logan, 1851)
- Phyllonorycter nigristella (Kumata, 1957)
- Phyllonorycter nipigon (Freeman, 1970)
- Phyllonorycter nipponicella (Issiki, 1930)
- Phyllonorycter nivalis Deschka, 1986
- Phyllonorycter obandai De Prins & Mozuraitis, 2006
- Phyllonorycter obscuricostella (Clemens, 1859)
- Phyllonorycter obsoleta (Frey & Boll, 1873)
- Phyllonorycter obtusifoliella Deschka, 1974
- Phyllonorycter occitanica (Frey & Boll, 1876)
- Phyllonorycter ocimellus de Prins, 2012
- Phyllonorycter olivaeformis (Braun, 1908)
- Phyllonorycter ololua de Prins, 2012
- Phyllonorycter olympica Deschka, 1983
- Phyllonorycter oreas Kumata, 1973
- Phyllonorycter oregonensis (Walsingham, 1889)
- Phyllonorycter orientalis (Kumata, 1963)
- Phyllonorycter ostryae (Kumata, 1963)
- Phyllonorycter ostryaefoliella (Clemens, 1859)
- Phyllonorycter ovalifoliae Kumata, 1973
- Phyllonorycter oxyacanthae (Frey, 1855)
- Phyllonorycter oxygrapta (Meyrick, 1915)
- Phyllonorycter parisiella (Wocke, 1848)
- Phyllonorycter parvifoliella (Ragonot, 1875)
- Phyllonorycter pastorella (Zeller, 1846)
- Phyllonorycter pavoniae (Vári, 1961)
- Phyllonorycter penangensis Kumata, 1993
- Phyllonorycter pernivalis (Braun, 1925)
- Phyllonorycter persimilis Fujihara, Sato & Kumata, 2001
- Phyllonorycter philerasta (Meyrick, 1922)
- Phyllonorycter phyllocytisi (M. Hering, 1936)
- Phyllonorycter pictus (Walsingham, 1914)
- Phyllonorycter platani (Staudinger, 1870)
- Phyllonorycter populi (Filipjev, 1931)
- Phyllonorycter populialbae (Kuznetzov, 1961)
- Phyllonorycter populicola (Kuznetzov, 1975)
- Phyllonorycter populiella (Chambers, 1878)
- Phyllonorycter populifoliella (Treitschke, 1833)
- Phyllonorycter propinquinella (Braun, 1908)
- Phyllonorycter pruinosella (Gerasimov, 1931)
- Phyllonorycter pseuditeina Kumata, 1973
- Phyllonorycter pseudojezoniella Noreika, 1994
- Phyllonorycter pseudojoviella Deschka, 1974
- Phyllonorycter pseudolautella (Kumata, 1963)
- Phyllonorycter pseudoplataniella (Ragonot, 1873)
- Phyllonorycter pterocaryae (Kumata, 1963)
- Phyllonorycter pulchra (Kumata, 1963)
- Phyllonorycter pumila Lastuvka & Lastuvka, 2006
- Phyllonorycter pumilae (Ermolaev, 1981)
- Phyllonorycter purgantella (Chrétien, 1910)
- Phyllonorycter pygmaea (Kumata, 1963)
- Phyllonorycter pyrifoliella (Gerasimov, 1933)
- Phyllonorycter pyrispinosae Deschka, 1986
- Phyllonorycter quercialbella (Fitch, 1859)
- Phyllonorycter quercifoliella (Zeller, 1839)
- Phyllonorycter quercus (Amsel, 1935)
- Phyllonorycter quinqueguttella (Stainton, 1851)
- Phyllonorycter raikhonae Noreika, 1993
- Phyllonorycter rajella (Linnaeus, 1758)
- Phyllonorycter rebimbasi (Mendes, 1910)
- Phyllonorycter reduncata (Ermolaev, 1986)
- Phyllonorycter restrictella (Braun, 1939)
- Phyllonorycter retamella (Chrétien, 1915)
- Phyllonorycter rhododendrella (Braun, 1935)
- Phyllonorycter rhynchosiae (Vári, 1961)
- Phyllonorycter ribefoliae (Braun, 1939)
- Phyllonorycter rileyella (Chambers, 1875)
- Phyllonorycter ringoniella (Matsumura, 1931)
- Phyllonorycter roboris (Zeller, 1839)
- Phyllonorycter rolandi (Svensson, 1966)
- Phyllonorycter rongensis de Prins, 2012
- Phyllonorycter rostrispinosa (Kumata, 1963)
- Phyllonorycter rubicola Kumata, 1973
- Phyllonorycter ruizivorus de Prins, 2012
- Phyllonorycter ruwenzori de Prins, 2012
- Phyllonorycter sagitella (Bjerkander, 1790)
- Phyllonorycter salicicolella (Sircom, 1848)
- Phyllonorycter salicifoliella (Chambers, 1871)
- Phyllonorycter salictella (Zeller, 1846)
- Phyllonorycter sandraella (Opler, 1971)
- Phyllonorycter scabiosella (Douglas, 1853)
- Phyllonorycter schreberella (Fabricius, 1781)
- Phyllonorycter scitulella (Duponchel, 1843)
- Phyllonorycter scopariella (Zeller, 1846)
- Phyllonorycter scudderella (Frey & Boll, 1873)
- Phyllonorycter sexnotella (Chambers, 1880)
- Phyllonorycter sibirica Kuznetzov & Baryshnikova, 2001
- Phyllonorycter silvicola de Prins, 2012
- Phyllonorycter similis Kumata, 1982
- Phyllonorycter solani (E. M. Hering, 1958)
- Phyllonorycter sorbi (Frey, 1855)
- Phyllonorycter sorbicola (Kumata, 1963)
- Phyllonorycter spartocytisi (M. Hering, 1927)
- Phyllonorycter spinicolella (Zeller, 1846)
- Phyllonorycter splendidus Deschka, 2013
- Phyllonorycter staintoniella (Nicelli, 1853)
- Phyllonorycter stephanandrae (Kumata, 1967)
- Phyllonorycter stephanota (Meyrick, 1907)
- Phyllonorycter stettinensis (Nicelli, 1852)
- Phyllonorycter stigmaphyllae Busck, 1934
- Phyllonorycter strigulatella (Zeller, 1846)
- Phyllonorycter styracis (Kumata, 1963)
- Phyllonorycter suaveolentis (Petry, 1904)
- Phyllonorycter suberifoliella (Zeller, 1850)
- Phyllonorycter sublautella (Stainton, 1869)
- Phyllonorycter symphoricarpaeella (Chambers, 1875)
- Phyllonorycter takagii (Kumata, 1963)
- Phyllonorycter tangerensis (Stainton, 1872)
- Phyllonorycter tauricus Deschka, 2013
- Phyllonorycter telinella Lastuvka & Lastuvka, 2006
- Phyllonorycter tenebriosa (Kumata, 1967)
- Phyllonorycter tenerella (de Joannis, 1915)
- Phyllonorycter tenuicaudella (Walsingham, 1897)
- Phyllonorycter tiliacella (Chambers, 1871)
- Phyllonorycter triarcha (Meyrick, 1908)
- Phyllonorycter tribhuvani Kumata, 1973
- Phyllonorycter tridentatae Lastuvka & Lastuvka, 2006
- Phyllonorycter trifasciella (Haworth, 1828)
- Phyllonorycter triflorella (Peyerimhoff, 1871)
- Phyllonorycter trifoliella (Gerasimov, 1933)
- Phyllonorycter trinotella (Braun, 1908)
- Phyllonorycter triplacomis (Meyrick, 1936)
- Phyllonorycter triplex (Meyrick, 1914)
- Phyllonorycter tristrigella (Haworth, 1828)
- Phyllonorycter tritaenianella (Chambers, 1871)
- Phyllonorycter tritorrhecta (Meyrick, 1935)
- Phyllonorycter trochetellus de Prins, 2012
- Phyllonorycter trojana Deschka, 1982
- Phyllonorycter troodi Deschka, 1974
- Phyllonorycter tsavensis de Prins, 2012
- Phyllonorycter turanica (Gerasimov, 1931)
- Phyllonorycter turcomanicella (Kuznetzov, 1956)
- Phyllonorycter turensis de Prins, 2012
- Phyllonorycter turugisana (Kumata, 1963)
- Phyllonorycter uchidai (Kumata, 1963)
- Phyllonorycter ulicicolella (Stainton, 1851)
- Phyllonorycter ulmi (Kumata, 1963)
- Phyllonorycter ulmifoliella (Hübner, 1817)
- Phyllonorycter umukarus de Prins, 2012
- Phyllonorycter valentina (Ermolaev, 1981)
- Phyllonorycter viburnella (Braun, 1923)
- Phyllonorycter viburni (Kumata, 1963)
- Phyllonorycter viciae (Kumata, 1963)
- Phyllonorycter viminetorum (Stainton, 1854)
- Phyllonorycter vueltas Lastuvka & Lastuvka, 2006
- Phyllonorycter vulturella (Deschka, 1968)
- Phyllonorycter watanabei (Kumata, 1963)
- Phyllonorycter yakusimensis (Kumata, 1967)
- Phyllonorycter yamadai Kumata, 1973
- Phyllonorycter zelkovae (Kumata, 1963)
- Phyllonorycter zonochares (Meyrick, 1933)

== Recently moved species ==
- Phyllonorycter aurifascia (Walker, 1875)
- Phyllonorycter morrisella (Fitch, 1859), moved to Macrosaccus Davis & De Prins, 2011
- Phyllonorycter robiniella (Clemens, 1859), moved to Macrosaccus Davis & De Prins, 2011, of which it is the type species
- Phyllonorycter uhlerella (Fitch, 1859), moved to Macrosaccus Davis & De Prins, 2011

== Species of unknown status ==
- Phyllonorycter crocinella (Sorhagen, 1900), original combination Lithocolletis crocinella. This species was described from Germany. The identity remains questionable, since no type material is known to exist and no further collections have been authenticated since it was described. Although it was originally reported as a leafminer on Salix, Spuler (1910) considered it only as a form of Phyllonorycter kleemannella (Fabricius), which mines the leaves of Alnus.
- Phyllonorycter graeseriella (Sorhagen, 1900), original combination Lithocolletis graeseriella. This species was described from Germany. The identity remains questionable, since no type material is known to exist and no further collections have been authenticated since it was described.
- Phyllonorycter salincolella (Sorhagen, 1900), original combination Lithocolletis salincolella. This species was described from Germany. The identity remains questionable, since no type material is known to exist and no further collections have been authenticated since it was described. Without explanation, Kuznetsov (1981) treated salincolella as a form of Phyllonorycter rajella which feeds on Alnus, although the original records report salincolella on Salix caprea.
