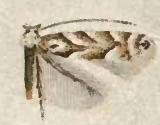

Scientific classification
- Kingdom: Animalia
- Phylum: Arthropoda
- Clade: Pancrustacea
- Class: Insecta
- Order: Lepidoptera
- Family: Gracillariidae
- Genus: Phyllonorycter
- Species: P. salicifoliella

Binomial name
- Phyllonorycter salicifoliella (Chambers, 1871)

Synonyms
- Lithocolletis salicifoliella Clemens, 1861 (nomen nudum); Lithocolletis kenora Freeman, 1970; Phyllonorycter kenora

= Phyllonorycter salicifoliella =

Species of moth

Phyllonorycter salicifoliella is a moth of the family Gracillariidae. It is widespread across North America, from Mississippi to Ontario in the east and from southern California to northern British Columbia in the west.

The length of the forewings is 3–4 mm. Adults are on wing from July to mid-August and again from late August to November in two generations.

The larvae mostly feed on Salix species, including Salix alba, Salix amygdaloides, Salix babylonica, Salix bebbiana, Salix bonplandiana, Salix caroliniana, Salix eriocephala, Salix lasiolepis, Salix "longifolia", Salix lutea, Salix monticola, Salix purpurea, Salix x rubens (Salix alba x Salix fragilis), Salix scouleriana and Salix sericea, but may also feed on Populus species, including Populus balsamifera and Populus tremuloides. They mine the leaves of their host plant.
