= Phyllonorycter christenseni =

Scientific classification
- Domain: Eukaryota
- Kingdom: Animalia
- Phylum: Arthropoda
- Class: Insecta
- Order: Lepidoptera
- Family: Gracillariidae
- Genus: Phyllonorycter
- Species: P. christenseni

Binomial name
- Phyllonorycter christenseni Derra, 1985

Species of moth

Phyllonorycter christenseni is a moth of the family Gracillariidae. It is known from Greece.
