= Phyllonorycter inusitatella =

Scientific classification
- Domain: Eukaryota
- Kingdom: Animalia
- Phylum: Arthropoda
- Class: Insecta
- Order: Lepidoptera
- Family: Gracillariidae
- Genus: Phyllonorycter
- Species: P. inusitatella

Binomial name
- Phyllonorycter inusitatella (Braun, 1925)

Species of moth

Phyllonorycter inusitatella is a moth of the family Gracillariidae. It is known from California, United States.

The larvae feed on Quercus agrifolia and Quercus wislizeni. They mine the leaves of their host plant.
