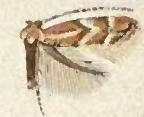
- Preserved specimen with right wings extended

Scientific classification
- Kingdom: Animalia
- Phylum: Arthropoda
- Clade: Pancrustacea
- Class: Insecta
- Order: Lepidoptera
- Family: Gracillariidae
- Genus: Phyllonorycter
- Species: P. celtisella

Binomial name
- Phyllonorycter celtisella (Chambers, 1871)

Synonyms
- Lithocolletis celtisella Chambers, 1871; Phyllonorycter celtiella (Meyrick, 1912); Phyllonorycter nonfasciella (Chambers, 1871); Phyllonorycter pusillifoliella (Frey & Boll, 1876)

= Phyllonorycter celtisella =

Species of moth

Phyllonorycter celtisella is a moth of the family Gracillariidae. It is known from Ontario in Canada and Connecticut, Illinois, Kentucky, Ohio, Oklahoma, and Texas in the United States.

The larvae feed on Celtis species, including Celtis occidentalis. They mine the leaves of their host plant. The mine has the form of a blotch mine on the upperside of the leaf. The larva, of the cylindrical type in the later stages, enters the leaf on the lower surface, and makes a narrow linear mine, then cuts through the parenchyma to the upper side, where the mine broadens into an elongate blotch, made tent-like by a longitudinal ridge in each epidermis. The larvae eat the entire parenchyma, leaving merely the dark discoloured cuticles of the leaf.

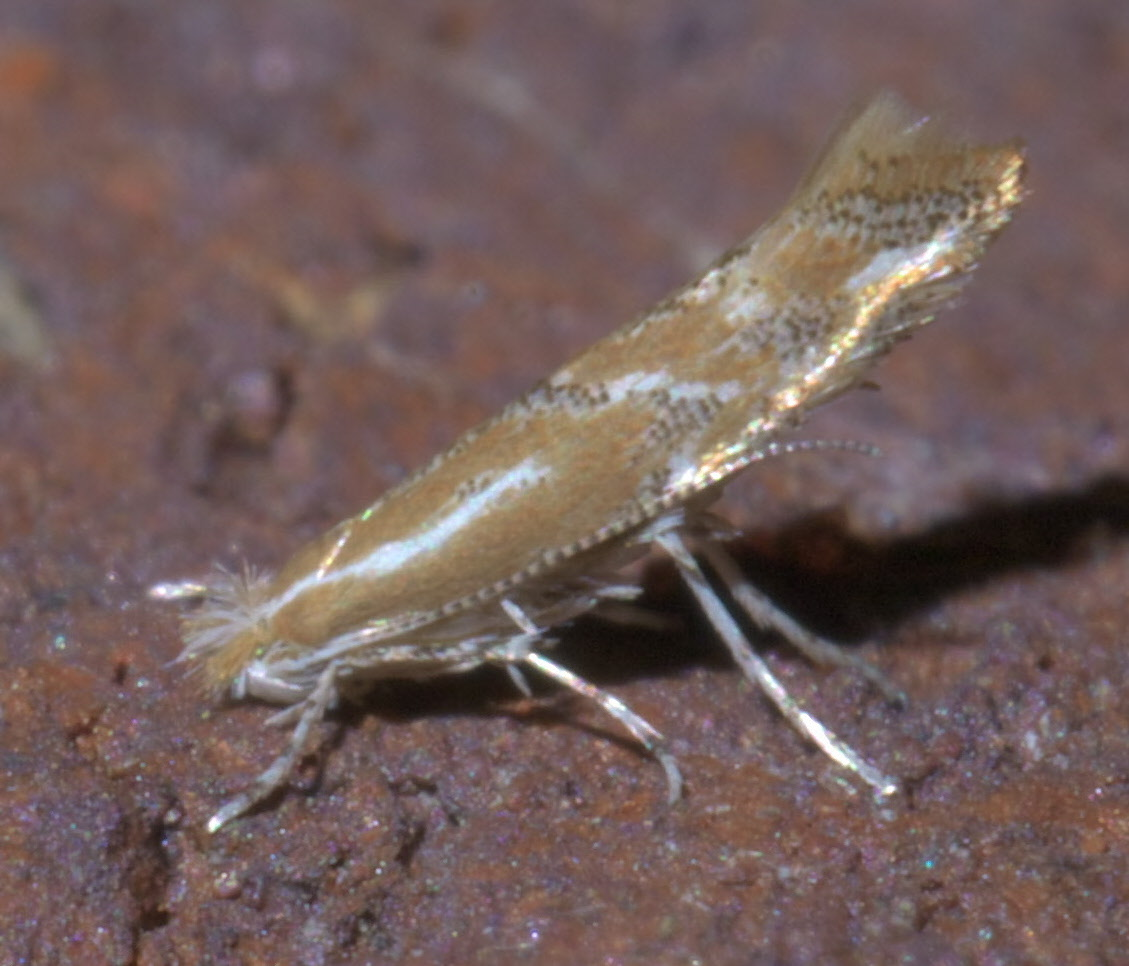
Lateral view (3.6 mm long)

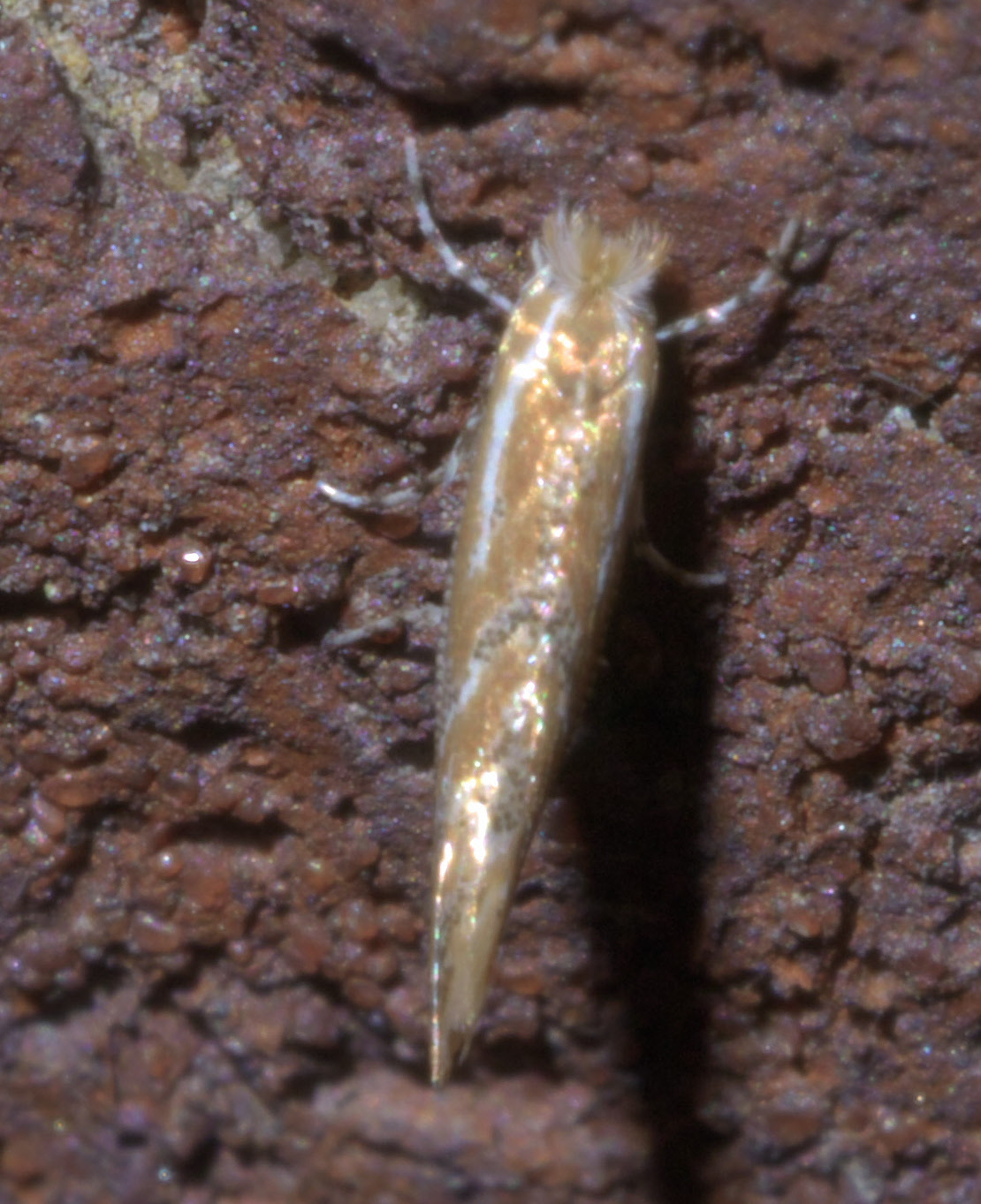
Dorsal view

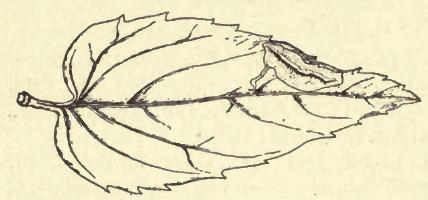
Leaf mine (upper right)
