= Phyllonorycter aberrans =

Scientific classification
- Kingdom: Animalia
- Phylum: Arthropoda
- Clade: Pancrustacea
- Class: Insecta
- Order: Lepidoptera
- Family: Gracillariidae
- Genus: Phyllonorycter
- Species: P. aberrans

Binomial name
- Phyllonorycter aberrans (Braun, 1930)

Species of moth

Phyllonorycter aberrans is a moth of the family Gracillariidae. It is known Ohio, Florida, Kentucky, Missouri, Arkansas, South Carolina and Tennessee in the United States.

The larvae feed on Desmodium species, including Desmodium canescens and Desmodium paniculatum. They mine the leaves of their host plant.
