= Phyllonorycter mildredae =

Scientific classification
- Kingdom: Animalia
- Phylum: Arthropoda
- Class: Insecta
- Order: Lepidoptera
- Family: Gracillariidae
- Genus: Phyllonorycter
- Species: P. mildredae

Binomial name
- Phyllonorycter mildredae Davis & Deschka, 2001

Species of moth

Phyllonorycter mildredae is a moth of the family Gracillariidae. It is probably widespread through the eastern United States but currently reported from only Washington D.C., Kentucky and Ohio.

The length of the forewings is 2.4–3 mm. Adults are on wing from April to early May, July and September. There is probably one generation per year with the adults overwintering.

The larvae feed on Populus alba, Populus canescens, Populus grandidentatum and Salix species. They mine the leaves of their host plant.
