= Phyllonorycter alluaudiella =

Scientific classification
- Domain: Eukaryota
- Kingdom: Animalia
- Phylum: Arthropoda
- Class: Insecta
- Order: Lepidoptera
- Family: Gracillariidae
- Genus: Phyllonorycter
- Species: P. alluaudiella

Binomial name
- Phyllonorycter alluaudiella (Chrétien, 1922)

Species of moth

Phyllonorycter alluaudiella is a moth of the family Gracillariidae. It is known from Morocco.
