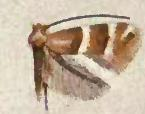

Scientific classification
- Kingdom: Animalia
- Phylum: Arthropoda
- Clade: Pancrustacea
- Class: Insecta
- Order: Lepidoptera
- Family: Gracillariidae
- Genus: Phyllonorycter
- Species: P. symphoricarpaeella

Binomial name
- Phyllonorycter symphoricarpaeella (Chambers, 1875)

Synonyms
- Lithocolletis symphoricarpaeella Chambers, 1875; Phyllonorycter bolliella (Dyar, 1903); Phyllonorycter symphoricarpella (Frey & Boll, 1878); Phyllonorycter symphoricarpella (Walsingham, 1889)

= Phyllonorycter symphoricarpaeella =

Species of moth

Phyllonorycter symphoricarpaeella is a moth belonging to the family Gracillariidae. It is known from Kentucky, Ohio, Texas, California and Maine in the United States.

The wingspan is 5.5–6 mm.

The larvae feed on Symphoricarpos species, including Symphoricarpos orbiculatus, Symphoricarpos symphoricarpos and Symphoricarpos vulgaris. They mine the leaves of their host plant. The mine has the form of a very small tentiform mine on the underside of the leaf. The mine is placed between two veins, and when mature is much wrinkled. Just before pupation, one half of the mine is lined with silk, and partitioned off, thus forming an ovoid silken chamber in which the pupa is formed. When the imago emerges the pupa case is thrust through the upper epidermis.
