= Phyllonorycter malayana =

Scientific classification
- Kingdom: Animalia
- Phylum: Arthropoda
- Class: Insecta
- Order: Lepidoptera
- Family: Gracillariidae
- Genus: Phyllonorycter
- Species: P. malayana

Binomial name
- Phyllonorycter malayana Kumata, 1993

Species of moth

Phyllonorycter malayana is a moth of the family Gracillariidae. It is known from Pahang, Malaysia.

The wingspan is 6.2-6.8 mm.

The larvae feed on Engelhardia spicata. They mine the leaves of their host plant.
