= Phyllonorycter argyrolobiella =

Scientific classification
- Domain: Eukaryota
- Kingdom: Animalia
- Phylum: Arthropoda
- Class: Insecta
- Order: Lepidoptera
- Family: Gracillariidae
- Genus: Phyllonorycter
- Species: P. argyrolobiella

Binomial name
- Phyllonorycter argyrolobiella Nel, 2009

Species of moth

Phyllonorycter argyrolobiella is a moth of the family Gracillariidae. It is known from France.

The larvae feed on Argyrolobium zanonii. They mine the leaves of their host plant.
