= Phyllonorycter nipigon =

Scientific classification
- Kingdom: Animalia
- Phylum: Arthropoda
- Class: Insecta
- Order: Lepidoptera
- Family: Gracillariidae
- Genus: Phyllonorycter
- Species: P. nipigon

Binomial name
- Phyllonorycter nipigon (Freeman, 1970)

Synonyms
- Lithocolletis nipigon Freeman, 1970

Species of moth

Phyllonorycter nipigon is a moth of the family Gracillariidae. It is widespread across northern North America from Ontario to Alaska, south to Colorado and the Sierra Nevada of California.

The length of the forewings is 3.4-4.4 mm. Adults are on wing from late July to late October in one generation.

The larvae feed on Populus balsamifera, Populus angustifolia, Populus fremontii, Populus nigra and Populus tremuloides. They mine the leaves of their host plant.
