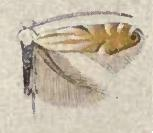

Scientific classification
- Domain: Eukaryota
- Kingdom: Animalia
- Phylum: Arthropoda
- Class: Insecta
- Order: Lepidoptera
- Family: Gracillariidae
- Genus: Phyllonorycter
- Species: P. lucidicostella

Binomial name
- Phyllonorycter lucidicostella (Clemens, 1859)

Synonyms
- Lithocolletis lucidicostella Clemens, 1859; Phyllonorycter ludicostella (Riley, 1891)

= Phyllonorycter lucidicostella =

Lesser maple leaf blotch miner

Species of moth

Phyllonorycter lucidicostella, lesser maple leaf blotch miner, is a moth of the family Gracillariidae. It is known from Ontario and Québec in Canada and Alabama, Connecticut, Illinois, Kentucky, Pennsylvania, Maine, Michigan, New York, Vermont and North Carolina in the United States.

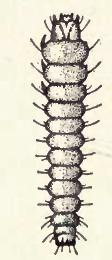
Larva

The wingspan is about 6.5 mm.

The larvae feed on Acer species, including Acer floridanum and Acer saccharinum. They mine the leaves of their host plant.
