= Phyllonorycter raikhonae =

Scientific classification
- Kingdom: Animalia
- Phylum: Arthropoda
- Class: Insecta
- Order: Lepidoptera
- Family: Gracillariidae
- Genus: Phyllonorycter
- Species: P. raikhonae

Binomial name
- Phyllonorycter raikhonae Noreika, 1993

Species of moth

Phyllonorycter raikhonae is a moth of the family Gracillariidae. It is known from Tajikistan.

The larvae feed on Lonicera species. It is posited that they may mine the leaves of their host plant.
