= Phyllonorycter aceripestis =

Scientific classification
- Domain: Eukaryota
- Kingdom: Animalia
- Phylum: Arthropoda
- Class: Insecta
- Order: Lepidoptera
- Family: Gracillariidae
- Genus: Phyllonorycter
- Species: P. aceripestis

Binomial name
- Phyllonorycter aceripestis (Kuznetzov, 1978)

Species of moth

Phyllonorycter aceripestis is a moth of the family Gracillariidae. It is known from Tajikistan and Turkmenistan.

The larvae feed on Acer regeli and Acer turkestanicum. They mine the leaves of their host plant.
