= Phyllonorycter pyrispinosae =

Scientific classification
- Kingdom: Animalia
- Phylum: Arthropoda
- Class: Insecta
- Order: Lepidoptera
- Family: Gracillariidae
- Genus: Phyllonorycter
- Species: P. pyrispinosae

Binomial name
- Phyllonorycter pyrispinosae Deschka, 1986

Species of moth

Phyllonorycter pyrispinosae is a moth of the family Gracillariidae. It is known from Turkey.

The length of the forewings is about 3.8 mm.

The larvae feed on Pyrus spinosa. They mine the leaves of their host plant. The mine is found on the underside of the leaf. It is oval in shape.
