= Phyllonorycter pseuditeina =

Scientific classification
- Kingdom: Animalia
- Phylum: Arthropoda
- Class: Insecta
- Order: Lepidoptera
- Family: Gracillariidae
- Genus: Phyllonorycter
- Species: P. pseuditeina

Binomial name
- Phyllonorycter pseuditeina Kumata, 1973

Species of moth

Phyllonorycter pseuditeina is a moth of the family Gracillariidae. It is native to Nepal.

The wingspan is 5-5.2 mm.

The larvae feed on an undetermined shrub. They mine the leaves of their host plant.
