= Phyllonorycter turcomanicella =

Scientific classification
- Domain: Eukaryota
- Kingdom: Animalia
- Phylum: Arthropoda
- Class: Insecta
- Order: Lepidoptera
- Family: Gracillariidae
- Genus: Phyllonorycter
- Species: P. turcomanicella

Binomial name
- Phyllonorycter turcomanicella (Kuznetzov, 1956)

Species of moth

Phyllonorycter turcomanicella is a moth of the family Gracillariidae, known from Turkmenistan.

The larvae feed on Acer turcomanicum, mining the leaves of their host plant.
