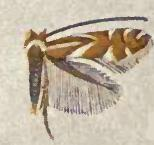

Scientific classification
- Domain: Eukaryota
- Kingdom: Animalia
- Phylum: Arthropoda
- Class: Insecta
- Order: Lepidoptera
- Family: Gracillariidae
- Genus: Phyllonorycter
- Species: P. kearfottella

Binomial name
- Phyllonorycter kearfottella (Braun, 1908)

Synonyms
- Lithocolletis kearfottella Braun, 1908

= Phyllonorycter kearfottella =

Species of moth

Phyllonorycter kearfottella is a moth of the family Gracillariidae. It is known from Connecticut, New Jersey, Kentucky, Maine, New York and Washington in the United States.

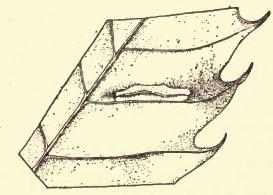
Mine

The wingspan is about 7 mm.

The larvae feed on Castanea species, including Castanea dentata, Castanea mollissima and Castanea sativa. They mine the leaves of their host plant.
