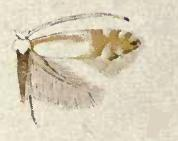

Scientific classification
- Domain: Eukaryota
- Kingdom: Animalia
- Phylum: Arthropoda
- Class: Insecta
- Order: Lepidoptera
- Family: Gracillariidae
- Genus: Phyllonorycter
- Species: P. quercialbella

Binomial name
- Phyllonorycter quercialbella (Fitch, 1859)

Synonyms
- Argyromiges quercialbella Fitch, 1859; Phyllonorycter quercibella (Chambers, 1875); Phyllonorycter quercipulchella (Chambers, 1878); Phyllonorycter quercipulchrella (Riley, 1891)

= Phyllonorycter quercialbella =

Species of moth

Phyllonorycter quercialbella is a moth of the family Gracillariidae. It is known from Québec in Canada and the eastern United States including Illinois, New York and Kentucky.

The wingspan is about 7 mm.

The larvae feed on Quercus species, including Quercus alba, Quercus macrocarpa, Quercus nigra and Quercus velutina. They mine the leaves of their host plant.
