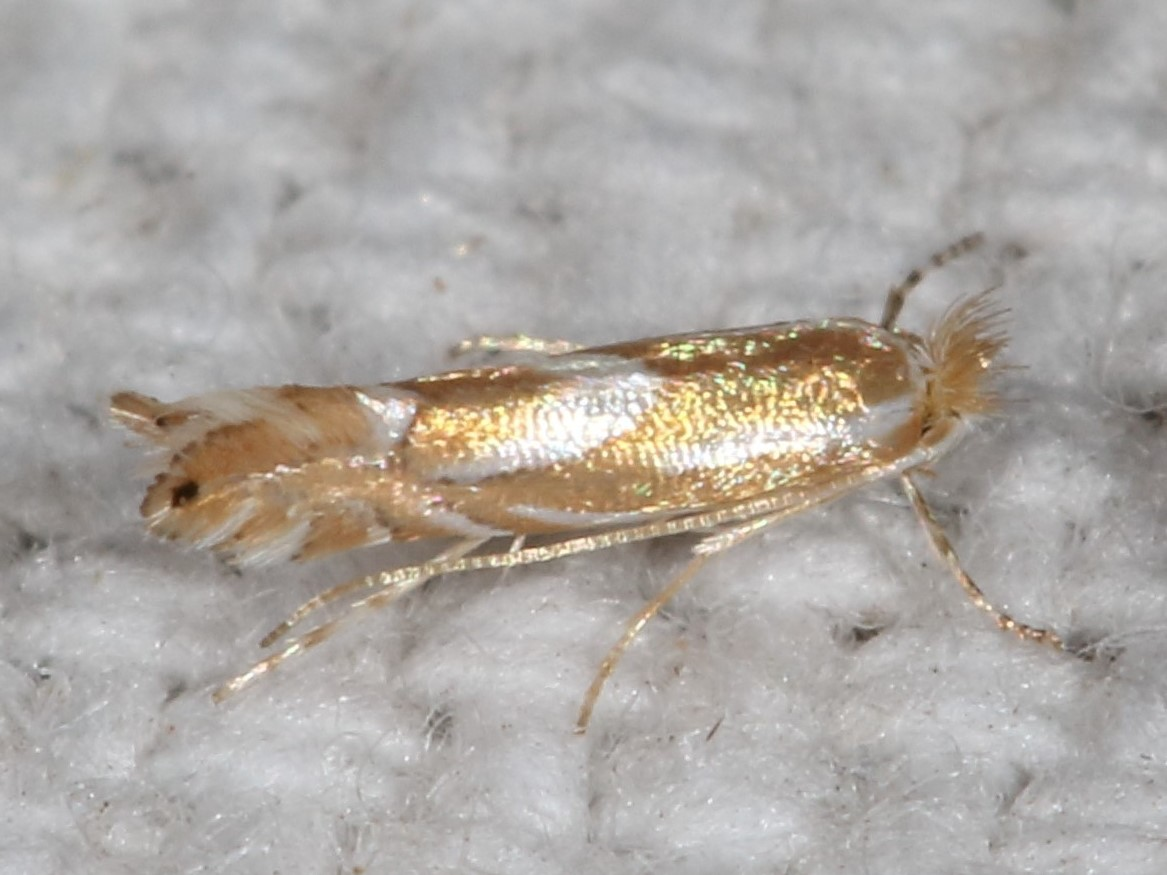

Scientific classification
- Kingdom: Animalia
- Phylum: Arthropoda
- Clade: Pancrustacea
- Class: Insecta
- Order: Lepidoptera
- Family: Gracillariidae
- Genus: Phyllonorycter
- Species: P. rileyella

Binomial name
- Phyllonorycter rileyella (Chambers, 1875)

Synonyms
- Lithocolletis rileyella Chambers, 1875; Phyllonorycter tenuistrigata (Frey & Boll, 1876)

= Phyllonorycter rileyella =

Species of moth

Phyllonorycter rileyella is a species of moth in the family Gracillariidae. It is known from Illinois, Missouri, Texas, Florida, Maine and Ohio in the United States.

The wingspan is 6–8 mm.

The larvae feed on Quercus species, including Quercus imbricaria, Quercus obtusifolia, Quercus rubra and Quercus stellata. They mine the leaves of their host plant.
