= Phyllonorycter armeniella =

Scientific classification
- Kingdom: Animalia
- Phylum: Arthropoda
- Class: Insecta
- Order: Lepidoptera
- Family: Gracillariidae
- Genus: Phyllonorycter
- Species: P. armeniella

Binomial name
- Phyllonorycter armeniella (Kuznetzov, 1958)

Synonyms
- Lithocolletis armeniella Kuznetzov, 1958

Species of moth

Phyllonorycter armeniella is a moth of the family Gracillariidae. It is known to be from Armenia and Turkey.

The larvae feed on Salix species. They mine the leaves of their host plant.
