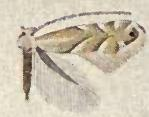

Scientific classification
- Kingdom: Animalia
- Phylum: Arthropoda
- Clade: Pancrustacea
- Class: Insecta
- Order: Lepidoptera
- Family: Gracillariidae
- Genus: Phyllonorycter
- Species: P. ostryaefoliella

Binomial name
- Phyllonorycter ostryaefoliella (Clemens, 1859)

Synonyms
- Lithocolletis ostryaefoliella Clemens, 1859; Phyllonorycter mirifica (Frey & Boll, 1873); Phyllonorycter ostryifoliella (Meyrick, 1912)

= Phyllonorycter ostryaefoliella =

Species of moth

Phyllonorycter ostryaefoliella is a species of moth in the family Gracillariidae. It is known from Canada (Nova Scotia, Ontario and Québec) and the United States (Connecticut, Illinois, New York, Kentucky, Maine and Vermont).

The wingspan is 6–6.5 mm.

The larvae feed on Ostrya species, including Ostrya virginiana. They mine the leaves of their host plant.
