= Phyllonorycter bascanaula =

Scientific classification
- Kingdom: Animalia
- Phylum: Arthropoda
- Class: Insecta
- Order: Lepidoptera
- Family: Gracillariidae
- Genus: Phyllonorycter
- Species: P. bascanaula

Binomial name
- Phyllonorycter bascanaula (Meyrick, 1936)

Species of moth

Phyllonorycter bascanaula is a moth of the family Gracillariidae. It is known from Java, Indonesia.

The larvae feed on Mucuna pruriens. They probably mine the leaves of their host plant.
