= Phyllonorycter humilitatis =

Scientific classification
- Kingdom: Animalia
- Phylum: Arthropoda
- Class: Insecta
- Order: Lepidoptera
- Family: Gracillariidae
- Genus: Phyllonorycter
- Species: P. humilitatis

Binomial name
- Phyllonorycter humilitatis Kumata, 1973

Species of moth

Phyllonorycter humilitatis is a moth of the family Gracillariidae. It is known from Nepal.

The wingspan is about 5.5 mm.
