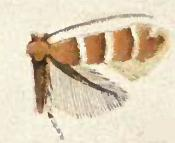

Scientific classification
- Kingdom: Animalia
- Phylum: Arthropoda
- Clade: Pancrustacea
- Class: Insecta
- Order: Lepidoptera
- Family: Gracillariidae
- Genus: Phyllonorycter
- Species: P. tritaenianella

Binomial name
- Phyllonorycter tritaenianella (Chambers, 1871)

Synonyms
- Lithocolletis tritaenianella Chambers, 1871; Phyllonorycter consimilella (Frey & Boll, 1873); Phyllonorycter tritaeneanella Chambers, 1871; Phyllonorycter tritaeniaella (Chambers, 1878); Phyllonorycter tritaeniella (Walsingham, 1889)

= Phyllonorycter tritaenianella =

Species of moth

Phyllonorycter tritaenianella is a moth of the family Gracillariidae. It is known from Québec in Canada and Illinois, Kentucky, Maine, Michigan, New York, Connecticut and Massachusetts in the United States.

The wingspan is 7–8 mm.

The larvae feed on Ostrya species, including Ostrya virginiana and Ostrya virginica. They mine the leaves of their host plant. The mine has the form of a rather large roundish blotch mine on the upperside of the leaf. At first the mine is a flat blotch, and the loosened epidermis is white, sparsely speckled with brown. Later, by contraction of the epidermis, the mine becomes roomy and tentiform and the leaf is completely folded over. The larva is green and of the cylindrical type, and spins a thin ovoid silken cocoon, fastened to the leaf above and below.
