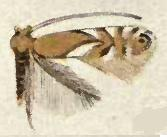

Scientific classification
- Domain: Eukaryota
- Kingdom: Animalia
- Phylum: Arthropoda
- Class: Insecta
- Order: Lepidoptera
- Family: Gracillariidae
- Genus: Phyllonorycter
- Species: P. aeriferella

Binomial name
- Phyllonorycter aeriferella (Clemens, 1859)

Synonyms
- Lithocolletis aeriferella Clemens, 1859; Phyllonorycter ceriferella (Edwards, 1889)

= Phyllonorycter aeriferella =

Species of moth

Phyllonorycter aeriferella is a moth of the family Gracillariidae. It is known from Canada (Ontario and Québec) and the United States (Florida, Ohio, Pennsylvania, Maine, New York, Connecticut, Kentucky and Illinois).

The wingspan is 7–8.5 mm.

The larvae feed on Quercus species, including Quercus alba, Quercus bicolor, Quercus falcata, Quercus ilicifolia, Quercus imbricaria, Quercus macrocarpa, Quercus muehlenbergii, Quercus nigra, Quercus prinus, Quercus tinctoria and Quercus velutina. They mine the leaves of their host plant.
