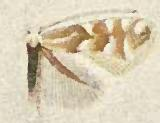

Scientific classification
- Kingdom: Animalia
- Phylum: Arthropoda
- Clade: Pancrustacea
- Class: Insecta
- Order: Lepidoptera
- Family: Gracillariidae
- Genus: Phyllonorycter
- Species: P. populiella

Binomial name
- Phyllonorycter populiella (Chambers, 1878)

Synonyms
- Lithocolletis populiella Chambers, 1878

= Phyllonorycter populiella =

Poplar leafminer moth

Species of moth

Phyllonorycter populiella, commonly known as the poplar leafminer moth, is a moth of the family Gracillariidae. It is known from Canada (British Columbia) and the United States (Kentucky, Ohio, Washington, Maine and New York).

The wingspan is 6–7 mm.

The larvae feed on Populus species, including Populus alba, Populus balsamifera, Populus dilatata, Populus grandidentata, Populus nigra and Populus tremuloides. They mine the leaves of their host plant. The mine has the form of a tentiform mine on the underside of the leaf. The mines are exceedingly small and oval. An indistinct fold extends through the long axis. They are scarcely visible on the lower side, owing to the peculiar tomentose texture of the leaf, and on the upperside may be distinguished by the speckled appearance of the leaf, caused by the larva eating the parenchyma in spots. The pupa is not enclosed in a cocoon, but its anal end is attached to a small button of silk toward one end of the roof of the mine.
