= Phyllonorycter lemarchandi =

Scientific classification
- Kingdom: Animalia
- Phylum: Arthropoda
- Class: Insecta
- Order: Lepidoptera
- Family: Gracillariidae
- Genus: Phyllonorycter
- Species: P. lemarchandi

Binomial name
- Phyllonorycter lemarchandi (Viette, 1951)

Synonyms
- Lithocolletis lemarchandi Viette, 1951

Species of moth

Phyllonorycter lemarchandi is a moth of the family Gracillariidae. It is known from Madagascar.

The length of the forewings is 2–2.3 mm. Adults are on wing in early September and from late December to early January.
