= Phyllonorycter libanotica =

Scientific classification
- Kingdom: Animalia
- Phylum: Arthropoda
- Class: Insecta
- Order: Lepidoptera
- Family: Gracillariidae
- Genus: Phyllonorycter
- Species: P. libanotica

Binomial name
- Phyllonorycter libanotica (Deschka, 1972)

Species of moth

Phyllonorycter libanotica is a moth of the family Gracillariidae. It is known from Lebanon.

The larvae probably feed on Quercus species and probably mine the leaves of their host plant.
