= Phyllonorycter graecus =

Scientific classification
- Domain: Eukaryota
- Kingdom: Animalia
- Phylum: Arthropoda
- Class: Insecta
- Order: Lepidoptera
- Family: Gracillariidae
- Genus: Phyllonorycter
- Species: P. graecus

Binomial name
- Phyllonorycter graecus A. & Z. Lastuvka, 2007

Species of moth

Phyllonorycter graecus is a moth of the family Gracillariidae. It is known from the Peloponnisos in Greece.

There are at least two, but possibly multiple generations per year.

The larvae feed on Quercus macrolepis. They mine the leaves of their host plant.
