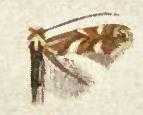

Scientific classification
- Kingdom: Animalia
- Phylum: Arthropoda
- Clade: Pancrustacea
- Class: Insecta
- Order: Lepidoptera
- Family: Gracillariidae
- Genus: Phyllonorycter
- Species: P. crataegella

Binomial name
- Phyllonorycter crataegella (Clemens, 1859)

Synonyms
- Lithocolletis crataegella Clemens, 1859; Lithocolletis malimalifoliella Braun, 1908; Phyllonorycter malifoliella (Meyrick, 1912)

= Phyllonorycter crataegella =

Species of moth

Phyllonorycter crataegella, the apple blotch leafminer, is a moth of the family Gracillariidae. It is known from Canada (Nova Scotia, Québec, Ontario and New Brunswick) the United States (Kentucky, Massachusetts, Michigan, Missouri, New Hampshire, New Jersey, New York, Ohio, Pennsylvania, Virginia, West Virginia, Wisconsin, California, Maine, Vermont, Oregon, Arkansas, Connecticut and Illinois).

The wingspan is 5.5–6 mm.

The larvae feed on Amelanchier species (including Amelanchier canadensis), Aronia species, Crataegus species (including Crataegus mollis), Cydonia species (including Cydonia japonica and Cydonia oblonga), Malus species (including Malus coronaria, Malus domestica, Malus malus, Malus pumila, Malus sieboldii and Malus sylvestris), Photinia species, Prunus species (including Prunus americana, Prunus avium, Prunus domestica, Prunus pennsylvanica, Prunus persica, Prunus serotina and Prunus virginiana), Pyrus species (including Pyrus communis and Pyrus coronaria) and Sorbus species (including Sorbus americana and Sorbus aucuparia). They mine the leaves of their host plant.
