= Phyllonorycter hissarella =

Scientific classification
- Kingdom: Animalia
- Phylum: Arthropoda
- Class: Insecta
- Order: Lepidoptera
- Family: Gracillariidae
- Genus: Phyllonorycter
- Species: P. hissarella

Binomial name
- Phyllonorycter hissarella Noreika, 1993

Synonyms
- Phyllonorycter hissariella Kuznetzov, 1999

Species of moth

Phyllonorycter hissarella is a moth of the family Gracillariidae. It is known from Tajikistan.

The larvae feed on Cotoneaster hissarica. They probably mine the leaves of their host plant.
