= Phyllonorycter cistifoliella =

Scientific classification
- Domain: Eukaryota
- Kingdom: Animalia
- Phylum: Arthropoda
- Class: Insecta
- Order: Lepidoptera
- Family: Gracillariidae
- Genus: Phyllonorycter
- Species: P. cistifoliella

Binomial name
- Phyllonorycter cistifoliella (Groschke, 1944)

Synonyms
- Lithocolletis cistifoliella Groschke, 1944

Species of moth

Phyllonorycter cistifoliella is a moth of the family Gracillariidae. It is known from Greece.

It is regarded a synonym of Phyllonorycter helianthemella by some authors, while other retain it as a valid species.
