= Phyllonorycter juglandicola =

Scientific classification
- Domain: Eukaryota
- Kingdom: Animalia
- Phylum: Arthropoda
- Class: Insecta
- Order: Lepidoptera
- Family: Gracillariidae
- Genus: Phyllonorycter
- Species: P. juglandicola

Binomial name
- Phyllonorycter juglandicola (Kuznetzov, 1975)

Species of moth

Phyllonorycter juglandicola is a moth of the family Gracillariidae.
