= Phyllonorycter oregonensis =

Scientific classification
- Domain: Eukaryota
- Kingdom: Animalia
- Phylum: Arthropoda
- Class: Insecta
- Order: Lepidoptera
- Family: Gracillariidae
- Genus: Phyllonorycter
- Species: P. oregonensis

Binomial name
- Phyllonorycter oregonensis (Walsingham, 1889)

Synonyms
- Lithocolletis oregonensis Walsingham, 1889

Species of moth

Phyllonorycter oregonensis is a moth of the family Gracillariidae. It is known from Oregon, United States.

The wingspan is about 7 mm.

The larvae feed on Symphoricarpos species, including Symphoricarpos albus. They mine the leaves of their host plant.
