= Phyllonorycter argentifrontella =

Scientific classification
- Kingdom: Animalia
- Phylum: Arthropoda
- Class: Insecta
- Order: Lepidoptera
- Family: Gracillariidae
- Genus: Phyllonorycter
- Species: P. argentifrontella

Binomial name
- Phyllonorycter argentifrontella (Walsingham, 1897)

Species of moth

Phyllonorycter argentifrontella is a moth of the family Gracillariidae. It is known from Saint Thomas, U.S. Virgin Islands.
