= Phyllonorycter fabaceaella =

Scientific classification
- Domain: Eukaryota
- Kingdom: Animalia
- Phylum: Arthropoda
- Class: Insecta
- Order: Lepidoptera
- Family: Gracillariidae
- Genus: Phyllonorycter
- Species: P. fabaceaella

Binomial name
- Phyllonorycter fabaceaella (Kuznetzov, 1978)

Synonyms
- Phyllonorycter fhabaceaella (Kuznetzov, 1978)

Species of moth

Phyllonorycter fabaceaella is a moth of the family Gracillariidae. It is known from Tajikistan.

The larvae feed on Lathyrus species. They probably mine the leaves of their host plant.
