= Phyllonorycter encaeria =

Scientific classification
- Kingdom: Animalia
- Phylum: Arthropoda
- Class: Insecta
- Order: Lepidoptera
- Family: Gracillariidae
- Genus: Phyllonorycter
- Species: P. encaeria

Binomial name
- Phyllonorycter encaeria (Meyrick, 1911)

Synonyms
- Lithocolletis encaeria Meyrick, 1911

Species of moth

Phyllonorycter encaeria is a moth of the family Gracillariidae. It is known from South Africa, where it has been recorded from Pretoria and the suburbs of Cape Town.

Adults are on wing from early January to late February and again from late September to mid-November.
