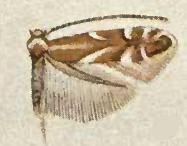

Scientific classification
- Domain: Eukaryota
- Kingdom: Animalia
- Phylum: Arthropoda
- Class: Insecta
- Order: Lepidoptera
- Family: Gracillariidae
- Genus: Phyllonorycter
- Species: P. incanella

Binomial name
- Phyllonorycter incanella (Walsingham, 1889)

Synonyms
- Lithocolletis incanella Walsingham, 1889

= Phyllonorycter incanella =

Species of moth

Phyllonorycter incanella is a moth of the family Gracillariidae. It is known from California, Maine and Arizona in the United States.

The wingspan is about 9 mm.

The larvae feed on Alnus species, including Alnus incana and Alnus rhombifolia. They mine the leaves of their host plant.
