= Phyllonorycter tribhuvani =

Scientific classification
- Kingdom: Animalia
- Phylum: Arthropoda
- Class: Insecta
- Order: Lepidoptera
- Family: Gracillariidae
- Genus: Phyllonorycter
- Species: P. tribhuvani

Binomial name
- Phyllonorycter tribhuvani Kumata, 1973

Species of moth

Phyllonorycter tribhuvani is a moth of the family Gracillariidae. It is known from Nepal.

== Overview ==
The wingspan is about 6.5 mm.

The larvae feed on Prunus cerasoides. They mine the leaves of their host plant.
