= Phyllonorycter solani =

Scientific classification
- Domain: Eukaryota
- Kingdom: Animalia
- Phylum: Arthropoda
- Class: Insecta
- Order: Lepidoptera
- Family: Gracillariidae
- Genus: Phyllonorycter
- Species: P. solani

Binomial name
- Phyllonorycter solani (E. M. Hering, 1958)

Species of moth

Phyllonorycter solani is a moth of the family Gracillariidae. It is known from Argentina.

The larvae feed on Solanum species. They mine the leaves of their host plant. The mine is found on the underside of the leaf.
