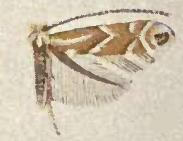

Scientific classification
- Domain: Eukaryota
- Kingdom: Animalia
- Phylum: Arthropoda
- Class: Insecta
- Order: Lepidoptera
- Family: Gracillariidae
- Genus: Phyllonorycter
- Species: P. apicinigrella

Binomial name
- Phyllonorycter apicinigrella (Braun, 1908)

Synonyms
- Lithocolletis apicinigrella Braun, 1908

= Phyllonorycter apicinigrella =

Species of moth

Phyllonorycter apicinigrella is a moth of the family Gracillariidae. It is found along the western coast of the United States from San Luis Obispo County, California, north to British Columbia, Canada.

The length of the forewings is 2.7-3.8 mm. Adults are on wing in May and from mid-June to mid-September. There are either two or three generations per year.

The larvae feed on Salix species, including Salix lasiandra and Salix sitchensis species. They mine the leaves of their host plant.
