= Phyllonorycter brunnea =

Scientific classification
- Kingdom: Animalia
- Phylum: Arthropoda
- Class: Insecta
- Order: Lepidoptera
- Family: Gracillariidae
- Genus: Phyllonorycter
- Species: P. brunnea

Binomial name
- Phyllonorycter brunnea Deschka, 1975

Species of moth

Phyllonorycter brunnea is a moth of the family Gracillariidae. It is known from the island of Rhodes in Greece.

The length of the forewings is about 3.1 mm (0.12 in).
