= Phyllonorycter olympica =

Scientific classification
- Kingdom: Animalia
- Phylum: Arthropoda
- Class: Insecta
- Order: Lepidoptera
- Family: Gracillariidae
- Genus: Phyllonorycter
- Species: P. olympica

Binomial name
- Phyllonorycter olympica Deschka, 1983

Species of moth

Phyllonorycter olympica is a moth of the family Gracillariidae. It is known from central Greece.

The larvae feed on Quercus coccifera. They mine the leaves of their host plant.
