= Phyllonorycter pavoniae =

Scientific classification
- Kingdom: Animalia
- Phylum: Arthropoda
- Class: Insecta
- Order: Lepidoptera
- Family: Gracillariidae
- Genus: Phyllonorycter
- Species: P. pavoniae

Binomial name
- Phyllonorycter pavoniae (Vári, 1961)

Synonyms
- Lithocolletis pavoniae Vári, 1961

Species of moth

Phyllonorycter pavoniae is a moth of the family Gracillariidae. It is known from South Africa.

The length of the forewings is 2.5–3 mm. Adults are on wing from early December to late May.

The larvae feed on Pavonia burchellii and Pavonia praemorsa. They mine the leaves of their host plant.
