= Phyllonorycter caspica =

Scientific classification
- Domain: Eukaryota
- Kingdom: Animalia
- Phylum: Arthropoda
- Class: Insecta
- Order: Lepidoptera
- Family: Gracillariidae
- Genus: Phyllonorycter
- Species: P. caspica

Binomial name
- Phyllonorycter caspica Noreika, 1992

Species of moth

Phyllonorycter caspica is a moth of the family Gracillariidae. It is known from Azerbaijan.
