= Phyllonorycter oreas =

Scientific classification
- Kingdom: Animalia
- Phylum: Arthropoda
- Clade: Pancrustacea
- Class: Insecta
- Order: Lepidoptera
- Family: Gracillariidae
- Genus: Phyllonorycter
- Species: P. oreas

Binomial name
- Phyllonorycter oreas Kumata, 1973

Species of moth

Phyllonorycter oreas is a moth of the family Gracillariidae. It is known from the Nepal.

The wingspan is 6-6.5 mm.

The larvae feed on Lannea and Odina species. They mine the leaves of their host plant.
