= Phyllonorycter aceriphaga =

Scientific classification
- Domain: Eukaryota
- Kingdom: Animalia
- Phylum: Arthropoda
- Class: Insecta
- Order: Lepidoptera
- Family: Gracillariidae
- Genus: Phyllonorycter
- Species: P. aceriphaga

Binomial name
- Phyllonorycter aceriphaga (Kuznetzov, 1975)

Species of moth

Phyllonorycter aceriphaga is a moth of the family Gracillariidae. It is known from Tajikistan and Turkmenistan.

The larvae feed on Acer turkestanicum. They probably mine the leaves of their host plant.
