= Phyllonorycter clerotoma =

Scientific classification
- Kingdom: Animalia
- Phylum: Arthropoda
- Class: Insecta
- Order: Lepidoptera
- Family: Gracillariidae
- Genus: Phyllonorycter
- Species: P. clerotoma

Binomial name
- Phyllonorycter clerotoma (Meyrick, 1915)

Species of moth

Phyllonorycter clerotoma is a moth of the family Gracillariidae. It is known from Ecuador.
