= Phyllonorycter penangensis =

Scientific classification
- Kingdom: Animalia
- Phylum: Arthropoda
- Class: Insecta
- Order: Lepidoptera
- Family: Gracillariidae
- Genus: Phyllonorycter
- Species: P. penangensis

Binomial name
- Phyllonorycter penangensis Kumata, 1993

Species of moth

Phyllonorycter penangensis is a moth of the family Gracillariidae. It is known from Penang, Malaysia.

The wingspan is 6-6.3 mm.

The larvae feed on Rubus moluccanus. They mine the leaves of their host plant.
