= Phyllonorycter dombeyae =

Scientific classification
- Domain: Eukaryota
- Kingdom: Animalia
- Phylum: Arthropoda
- Class: Insecta
- Order: Lepidoptera
- Family: Gracillariidae
- Genus: Phyllonorycter
- Species: P. dombeyae

Binomial name
- Phyllonorycter dombeyae de Prins, 2012

Species of moth

Phyllonorycter dombeyae is a moth of the family Gracillariidae. It is found in eastern South Africa in savannah intermixed with bushes and lower trees.

The length of the forewings is 2.28–2.48 mm.
