= Phyllonorycter gerfriedi =

Scientific classification
- Domain: Eukaryota
- Kingdom: Animalia
- Phylum: Arthropoda
- Class: Insecta
- Order: Lepidoptera
- Family: Gracillariidae
- Genus: Phyllonorycter
- Species: P. gerfriedi

Binomial name
- Phyllonorycter gerfriedi A. & Z. Lastuvka, 2007

Species of moth

Phyllonorycter gerfriedi is a moth of the family Gracillariidae. It is known from Crete.

The larvae feed on Quercus coccifera. They mine the leaves of their host plant. They create a lower-surface tentiform mine.
