= Phyllonorycter loniceriphaga =

Scientific classification
- Domain: Eukaryota
- Kingdom: Animalia
- Phylum: Arthropoda
- Class: Insecta
- Order: Lepidoptera
- Family: Gracillariidae
- Genus: Phyllonorycter
- Species: P. loniceriphaga

Binomial name
- Phyllonorycter loniceriphaga Noreika, 1992

Species of moth

Phyllonorycter loniceriphaga is a moth of the family Gracillariidae. It is known from Tajikistan.

The larvae feed on Lonicera korolkowii. They probably mine the leaves of their host plant.
