= Phyllonorycter grewiaephilos =

Scientific classification
- Domain: Eukaryota
- Kingdom: Animalia
- Phylum: Arthropoda
- Class: Insecta
- Order: Lepidoptera
- Family: Gracillariidae
- Genus: Phyllonorycter
- Species: P. grewiaephilos

Binomial name
- Phyllonorycter grewiaephilos de Prins, 2012

Species of moth

Phyllonorycter grewiaephilos is a moth of the family Gracillariidae. It is found in the Rift Valley and Tsavo National Park in Kenya. The habitat consists of savannah areas at altitudes between 470 and 920 meters.

The length of the forewings is 2.7–2.9 mm.
