= Phyllonorycter menaea =

Scientific classification
- Kingdom: Animalia
- Phylum: Arthropoda
- Clade: Pancrustacea
- Class: Insecta
- Order: Lepidoptera
- Family: Gracillariidae
- Genus: Phyllonorycter
- Species: P. menaea

Binomial name
- Phyllonorycter menaea (Meyrick, 1918)

Species of moth

Phyllonorycter menaea is a moth of the family Gracillariidae. It is known from Pakistan.
