= Phyllonorycter holodisci =

Scientific classification
- Domain: Eukaryota
- Kingdom: Animalia
- Phylum: Arthropoda
- Class: Insecta
- Order: Lepidoptera
- Family: Gracillariidae
- Genus: Phyllonorycter
- Species: P. holodisci

Binomial name
- Phyllonorycter holodisci (Braun, 1939)

Species of moth

Phyllonorycter holodisci is a species of moth in the family Gracillariidae. This species is known from California, United States.

The larvae feed on the leaves of the shrub Holodiscus discolor. The larvae mine the leaves of their host plant. The mine is located on the upper side of the leaf.
