= Phyllonorycter triplacomis =

Scientific classification
- Kingdom: Animalia
- Phylum: Arthropoda
- Class: Insecta
- Order: Lepidoptera
- Family: Gracillariidae
- Genus: Phyllonorycter
- Species: P. triplacomis

Binomial name
- Phyllonorycter triplacomis (Meyrick, 1936)

Species of moth

Phyllonorycter triplacomis is a moth of the family Gracillariidae. It is known from Taiwan.

The larvae feed on Photinia lucida and Photinia taiwanensis. They probably mine the leaves of their host plant.
