= Phyllonorycter deserticola =

Scientific classification
- Kingdom: Animalia
- Phylum: Arthropoda
- Class: Insecta
- Order: Lepidoptera
- Family: Gracillariidae
- Genus: Phyllonorycter
- Species: P. deserticola

Binomial name
- Phyllonorycter deserticola Davis & Deschka, 2001

Species of moth

Phyllonorycter deserticola is a moth of the family Gracillariidae. It is found in restricted, mostly arid habitats over a broad portion of the south-western United States and northern Mexico from southern Utah to Durango and west to northern California.

The length of the forewings is 2.9-3.8 mm. Adults are on wing from late July to early October in two generations, with the second generation overwintering.

The larvae feed on Populus species, including Populus fremontii, Populus deltoides wislizeni, Populus x parryi (Populus freemontii x Populus trichocarpa). They mine the leaves of their host plant.
