= Phyllonorycter infirma =

Scientific classification
- Kingdom: Animalia
- Phylum: Arthropoda
- Class: Insecta
- Order: Lepidoptera
- Family: Gracillariidae
- Genus: Phyllonorycter
- Species: P. infirma

Binomial name
- Phyllonorycter infirma Deschka, 1975

Species of moth

Phyllonorycter infirma is a moth of the family Gracillariidae. It is known from Afghanistan.

The length of the forewings is about 2.8 mm.

The larvae probably feed on Rosacea species. They mine the leaves of their host plant.
