= Phyllonorycter rhynchosiae =

Scientific classification
- Kingdom: Animalia
- Phylum: Arthropoda
- Class: Insecta
- Order: Lepidoptera
- Family: Gracillariidae
- Genus: Phyllonorycter
- Species: P. rhynchosiae

Binomial name
- Phyllonorycter rhynchosiae (Vári, 1961)

Synonyms
- Lithocolletis rhynchosiae Vári, 1961

Species of moth

Phyllonorycter rhynchosiae is a moth of the family Gracillariidae. It is known from South Africa. The habitat consists of the urban hills of Pretoria.

The length of the forewings is 3–3.3 mm. Adults are on wing from early January to mid-March and from early June to mid-August.

The larvae feed on Eriosema psoraleoides, Rhynchosia confusa and Rhynchosia nitens. They mine the leaves of their host plant.
