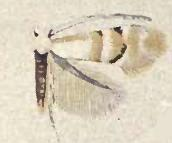

Scientific classification
- Kingdom: Animalia
- Phylum: Arthropoda
- Clade: Pancrustacea
- Class: Insecta
- Order: Lepidoptera
- Family: Gracillariidae
- Genus: Phyllonorycter
- Species: P. lucetiella

Binomial name
- Phyllonorycter lucetiella (Clemens, 1859)

Synonyms
- Lithocolletis lucetiella Clemens, 1859; Phyllonorycter aenigmatella (Frey & Boll, 1873)

= Phyllonorycter lucetiella =

Species of moth

Phyllonorycter lucetiella is a moth of the family Gracillariidae. It is known from Québec in Canada and Illinois, Kentucky, Pennsylvania, Florida, Georgia, Maine, Maryland, Michigan, New York, Vermont, Connecticut and Massachusetts in the United States.

The wingspan is 6–7 mm.

The larvae feed on Ostrya virginiana and Tilia species (including Tilia americana, Tilia x vulgaris and Tilia × europaea). They mine the leaves of their host plant. The mine has the form of a tentiform mine on underside of leaf, but it is conspicuously visible on the upperside of the leaf, due to removal of green parenchyma tissue from the upper wall. The mine is rectangular, often nearly square, and placed between two veins and unwrinkled. When complete, the mine is transparent, and the pupa, which is contained in an oval cocoon, is plainly visible.
