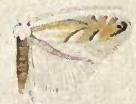

Scientific classification
- Kingdom: Animalia
- Phylum: Arthropoda
- Clade: Pancrustacea
- Class: Insecta
- Order: Lepidoptera
- Family: Gracillariidae
- Genus: Phyllonorycter
- Species: P. caryaealbella

Binomial name
- Phyllonorycter caryaealbella (Chambers, 1871)

Synonyms
- Lithocolletis caryaealbella Chambers, 1871; Phyllonorycter caryalbella (Walsingham, 1891)

= Phyllonorycter caryaealbella =

Species of moth

Phyllonorycter caryaealbella is a moth of the family Gracillariidae. It is known from Georgia, Kentucky, Wisconsin and Florida in the United States.

The wingspan is about 5 mm.

The larvae feed on Carya illinoinensis and Carya ovata. They mine the leaves of their host plant. The mine has the form of a tentiform mine on the underside of the leaf. The parenchyma is eaten off of the upper cuticle in a ring, leaving a green spot in the centre, which is then eaten off. The pupa is contained in an oval cocoon made of frass.
