= Phyllonorycter diversella =

Scientific classification
- Kingdom: Animalia
- Phylum: Arthropoda
- Clade: Pancrustacea
- Class: Insecta
- Order: Lepidoptera
- Family: Gracillariidae
- Genus: Phyllonorycter
- Species: P. diversella

Binomial name
- Phyllonorycter diversella (Braun, 1916)

Species of moth

Phyllonorycter diversella is a moth of the family Gracillariidae. It is known from Nova Scotia in Canada and Connecticut, Ohio, Kentucky, Maine and Vermont in the United States.

The larvae feed on Gaylussacia species (including Gaylussacia baccata and Gaylussacia frondosa), Oxydendrum species (including Oxydendrum arboreum) and Vaccinium species (including Vaccinium corymbosum). They mine the leaves of their host plant.
