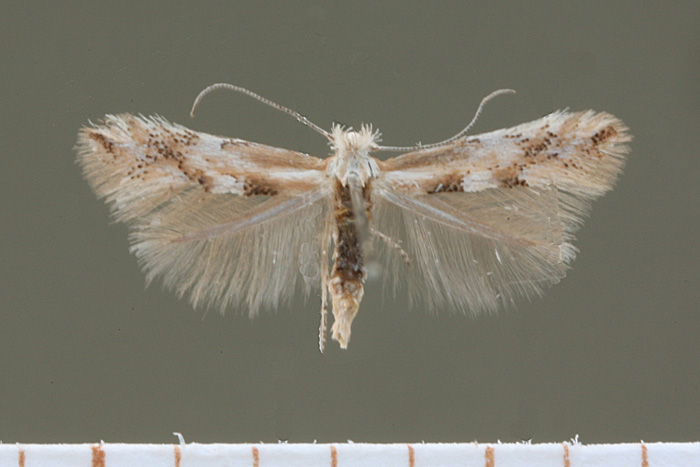

Scientific classification
- Domain: Eukaryota
- Kingdom: Animalia
- Phylum: Arthropoda
- Class: Insecta
- Order: Lepidoptera
- Family: Gracillariidae
- Genus: Phyllonorycter
- Species: P. crimea

Binomial name
- Phyllonorycter crimea Baryshnikova & Budashkin, 2005

= Phyllonorycter crimea =

Species of moth

Phyllonorycter crimea is a moth of the family Gracillariidae. It is known from the Crimea in Ukraine.
