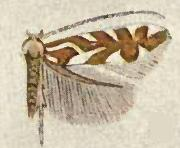

Scientific classification
- Domain: Eukaryota
- Kingdom: Animalia
- Phylum: Arthropoda
- Class: Insecta
- Order: Lepidoptera
- Family: Gracillariidae
- Genus: Phyllonorycter
- Species: P. insignis

Binomial name
- Phyllonorycter insignis (Walsingham, 1889)

Synonyms
- Lithocolletis insignis Walsingham, 1889

= Phyllonorycter insignis =

Species of moth

Phyllonorycter insignis is a moth of the family Gracillariidae. It is known from California and Maine in the United States.

The wingspan is about 9 mm.

The larvae feed on Erechtites species and Ceanothus integerrimus. They mine the leaves of their host plant.
