= Phyllonorycter populicola =

Scientific classification
- Domain: Eukaryota
- Kingdom: Animalia
- Phylum: Arthropoda
- Class: Insecta
- Order: Lepidoptera
- Family: Gracillariidae
- Genus: Phyllonorycter
- Species: P. populicola

Binomial name
- Phyllonorycter populicola (Kuznetzov, 1975)

Synonyms
- Lithocolletis populicola Kuznetzov, 1975

Species of moth

Phyllonorycter populicola is a moth of the family Gracillariidae. It is known from Tajikistan.

The larvae feed on Populus species, including Populus afghanica and Populus tadshikistanica. They probably mine the leaves of their host plant.
