= Phyllonorycter latus =

Scientific classification
- Kingdom: Animalia
- Phylum: Arthropoda
- Class: Insecta
- Order: Lepidoptera
- Family: Gracillariidae
- Genus: Phyllonorycter
- Species: P. latus

Binomial name
- Phyllonorycter latus Davis & Deschka, 2001

Species of moth

Phyllonorycter latus is a moth of the family Gracillariidae. It is probably widespread throughout the western United States, but only known from Inyo County in California and Grand and Alamosa counties in Colorado.

The length of the forewings is 3.7-4.4 mm. Adults are on wing in August in one generation.

The larvae feed on Populus tremuloides. They mine the leaves of their host plant.
