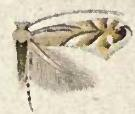

Scientific classification
- Kingdom: Animalia
- Phylum: Arthropoda
- Clade: Pancrustacea
- Class: Insecta
- Order: Lepidoptera
- Family: Gracillariidae
- Genus: Phyllonorycter
- Species: P. obscuricostella

Binomial name
- Phyllonorycter obscuricostella (Clemens, 1859)

Synonyms
- Lithocolletis obscuricostella Clemens, 1859; Phyllonorycter virginella (Dyar, 1903); Phyllonorycter virginiella (Chambers, 1871)

= Phyllonorycter obscuricostella =

Species of moth

Phyllonorycter obscuricostella is a moth of the family Gracillariidae. It is known from Connecticut, Illinois, Kentucky, Pennsylvania, Maine and New York in the United States.

The wingspan is 6-6.5 mm.

The larvae feed on Ostrya species, including Ostrya virginiana and Ostrya virginica. They mine the leaves of their host plant.
