= Phyllonorycter sandraella =

Scientific classification
- Kingdom: Animalia
- Phylum: Arthropoda
- Class: Insecta
- Order: Lepidoptera
- Family: Gracillariidae
- Genus: Phyllonorycter
- Species: P. sandraella

Binomial name
- Phyllonorycter sandraella (Opler, 1971)

Species of moth

Phyllonorycter sandraella is a moth of the family Gracillariidae. It is known from California, United States.

The larvae feed on Quercus agrifolia and Quercus wislizeni. They mine the leaves of their host plant.
