= Phyllonorycter flava =

Scientific classification
- Kingdom: Animalia
- Phylum: Arthropoda
- Class: Insecta
- Order: Lepidoptera
- Family: Gracillariidae
- Genus: Phyllonorycter
- Species: P. flava

Binomial name
- Phyllonorycter flava Deschka, 1975

Species of moth

Phyllonorycter flava is a moth of the family Gracillariidae. It is known from Asia Minor.

The length of the forewings is about 3.9 mm.

The larvae probably feed on Quercus species. They mine the leaves of their host plant.
