= Phyllonorycter tauricus =

Scientific classification
- Kingdom: Animalia
- Phylum: Arthropoda
- Class: Insecta
- Order: Lepidoptera
- Family: Gracillariidae
- Genus: Phyllonorycter
- Species: P. tauricus

Binomial name
- Phyllonorycter tauricus Deschka, 2013

Species of moth

Phyllonorycter tauricus is a moth of the family Gracillariidae. It is known from Turkey.

The larvae feed on Ostrya carpinifolia. They mine the leaves of their host plant.
