= Phyllonorycter quercus =

Scientific classification
- Domain: Eukaryota
- Kingdom: Animalia
- Phylum: Arthropoda
- Class: Insecta
- Order: Lepidoptera
- Family: Gracillariidae
- Genus: Phyllonorycter
- Species: P. quercus

Binomial name
- Phyllonorycter quercus (Amsel & Hering, 1931)

Species of moth

Phyllonorycter quercus is a moth of the family Gracillariidae. It is known from Palestine and Israel.

The larvae feed on Quercus coccifera. They mine the leaves of their host plant.
