= Phyllonorycter idolias =

Scientific classification
- Kingdom: Animalia
- Phylum: Arthropoda
- Class: Insecta
- Order: Lepidoptera
- Family: Gracillariidae
- Genus: Phyllonorycter
- Species: P. idolias

Binomial name
- Phyllonorycter idolias (Meyrick, 1891)

Species of moth

Phyllonorycter idolias is a moth of the family Gracillariidae. It is known from Algeria.

The food plant is unknown, but a specimen was beaten from a Quercus species.
