= Phyllonorycter stigmaphyllae =

Scientific classification
- Kingdom: Animalia
- Phylum: Arthropoda
- Class: Insecta
- Order: Lepidoptera
- Family: Gracillariidae
- Genus: Phyllonorycter
- Species: P. stigmaphyllae

Binomial name
- Phyllonorycter stigmaphyllae Busck, 1934

Species of moth

Phyllonorycter stigmaphyllae is a moth of the family Gracillariidae. It is known from Cuba.

The larvae feed on Stigmaphyllon sagraeanum. They mine the leaves of their host plant.
