= Phyllonorycter extincta =

Scientific classification
- Kingdom: Animalia
- Phylum: Arthropoda
- Class: Insecta
- Order: Lepidoptera
- Family: Gracillariidae
- Genus: Phyllonorycter
- Species: P. extincta

Binomial name
- Phyllonorycter extincta (Deschka, 1974)

Species of moth

Phyllonorycter extincta is a moth of the family Gracillariidae. It is known from Tunisia.

The larvae feed on Quercus coccifera and Quercus suber. They mine the leaves of their host plant.
