= Phyllonorycter mirbeckifoliae =

Scientific classification
- Kingdom: Animalia
- Phylum: Arthropoda
- Class: Insecta
- Order: Lepidoptera
- Family: Gracillariidae
- Genus: Phyllonorycter
- Species: P. mirbeckifoliae

Binomial name
- Phyllonorycter mirbeckifoliae (Deschka, 1974)

Species of moth

Phyllonorycter mirbeckifoliae is a moth of the family Gracillariidae. It is known from Tunisia.

The larvae feed on Quercus mirbeckii. They mine the leaves of their host plant. The mine is found on the underside of the leaf.
