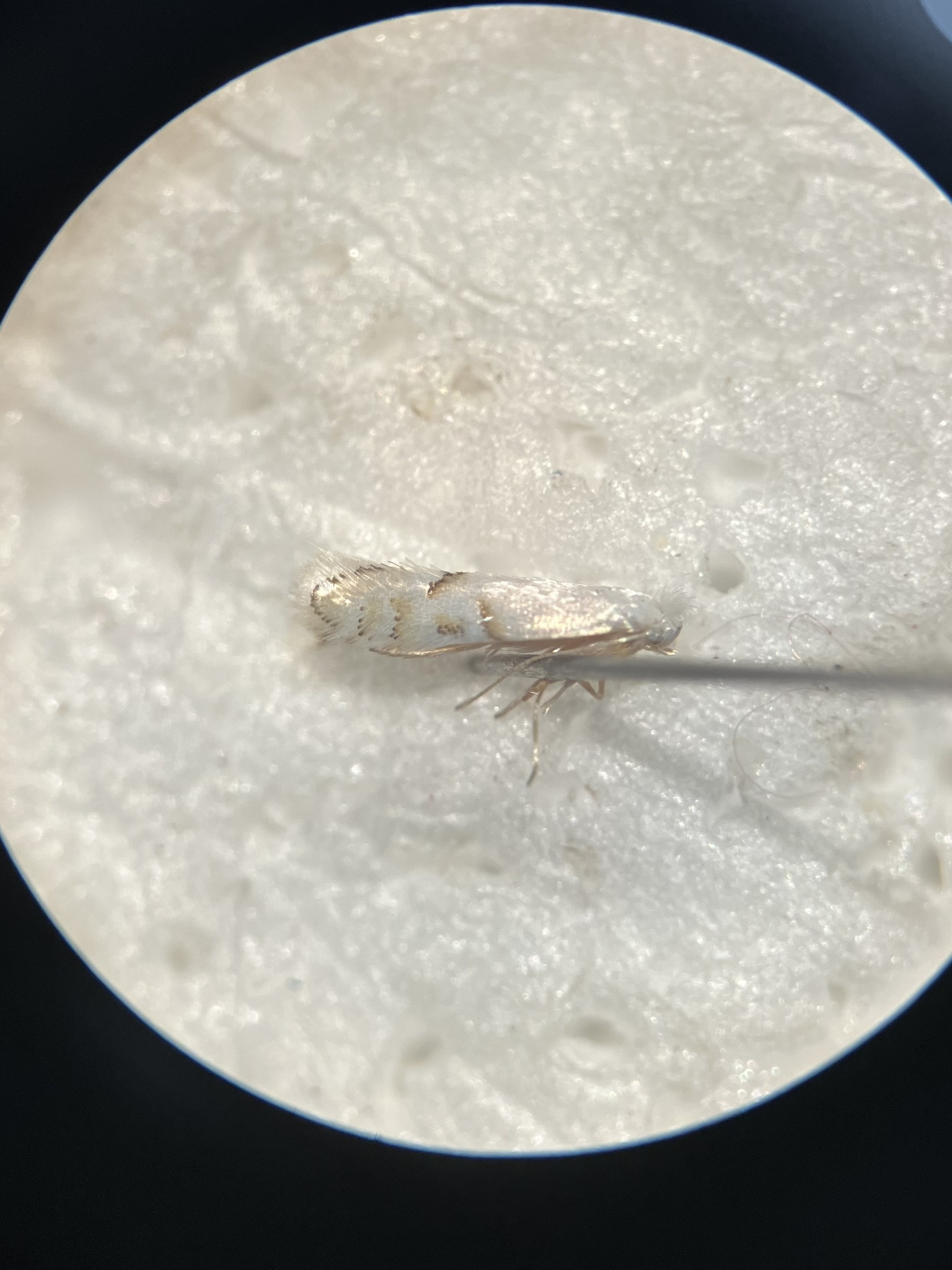

Scientific classification
- Kingdom: Animalia
- Phylum: Arthropoda
- Clade: Pancrustacea
- Class: Insecta
- Order: Lepidoptera
- Family: Gracillariidae
- Genus: Phyllonorycter
- Species: P. pernivalis

Binomial name
- Phyllonorycter pernivalis (Braun, 1925)

= Phyllonorycter pernivalis =

Species of moth

Phyllonorycter pernivalis is a species of moth in the family Gracillariidae. It is known from Utah, United States.

The larvae feed on Acer grandidentatum. They mine the leaves of their host plant. The mine has the form of a whitish, tentiform mine. In the end, the parenchyma is almost entirely consumed and the loosened epidermis is drawn into one heavy and several fine wrinkles. It is usually found in the middle of the leaf, but sometimes at the tip of one of the lobes, which is then bent under.
