= Phyllonorycter tenuicaudella =

Scientific classification
- Domain: Eukaryota
- Kingdom: Animalia
- Phylum: Arthropoda
- Class: Insecta
- Order: Lepidoptera
- Family: Gracillariidae
- Genus: Phyllonorycter
- Species: P. tenuicaudella

Binomial name
- Phyllonorycter tenuicaudella (Walsingham, 1897)

Species of moth

Phyllonorycter tenuicaudella is a moth of the family Gracillariidae. It is known from Saint Croix, U.S. Virgin Islands.
