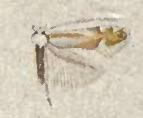

Scientific classification
- Domain: Eukaryota
- Kingdom: Animalia
- Phylum: Arthropoda
- Class: Insecta
- Order: Lepidoptera
- Family: Gracillariidae
- Genus: Phyllonorycter
- Species: P. trinotella

Binomial name
- Phyllonorycter trinotella (Braun, 1908)

Synonyms
- Lithocolletis trinotella Braun, 1908

= Phyllonorycter trinotella =

Species of moth

Phyllonorycter trinotella is a moth of the family Gracillariidae. It is known from Québec in Canada and New Jersey, Maine, Connecticut, Ohio, Vermont and Michigan in the United States.

The wingspan is about 5 mm.

The larvae feed on Acer species, including Acer platanoides, Acer rubrum and Acer saccharinum. They mine the leaves of their host plant.
