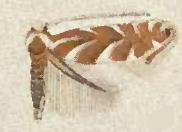

Scientific classification
- Kingdom: Animalia
- Phylum: Arthropoda
- Clade: Pancrustacea
- Class: Insecta
- Order: Lepidoptera
- Family: Gracillariidae
- Genus: Phyllonorycter
- Species: P. argentinotella

Binomial name
- Phyllonorycter argentinotella (Clemens, 1859)

Synonyms
- Lithocolletis argentinotella Clemens, 1859; Phyllonorycter argintinotella (Chambers, 1875)

= Phyllonorycter argentinotella =

Species of moth

Phyllonorycter argentinotella is a moth of the family Gracillariidae. It is known from Québec in Canada and Illinois, Kentucky, Pennsylvania, New York, Vermont, Connecticut and Massachusetts in the United States.

The wingspan is 6.5–8 mm.

The larvae feed on Ulmus species, including Ulmus americana, Ulmus fulva and Ulmus rubra. They mine the leaves of their host plant.
