= Phyllonorycter formosella =

Scientific classification
- Domain: Eukaryota
- Kingdom: Animalia
- Phylum: Arthropoda
- Class: Insecta
- Order: Lepidoptera
- Family: Gracillariidae
- Genus: Phyllonorycter
- Species: P. formosella

Binomial name
- Phyllonorycter formosella (Legrand, 1965)

Synonyms
- Lithocolletis formosella Meyrick, 1911; Euprophantis formosella

Species of moth

Phyllonorycter formosella is a moth of the family Gracillariidae. It is known from the Seychelles.

== Taxonomy ==
The species was transferred to the family Glyphipterigidae by De Prins & De Prins in 2005.
