= Phyllonorycter pseudojoviella =

Scientific classification
- Kingdom: Animalia
- Phylum: Arthropoda
- Class: Insecta
- Order: Lepidoptera
- Family: Gracillariidae
- Genus: Phyllonorycter
- Species: P. pseudojoviella

Binomial name
- Phyllonorycter pseudojoviella (Deschka, 1974)

Species of moth

Phyllonorycter pseudojoviella is a moth of the family Gracillariidae. It is known from Tunisia and Algeria.

The larvae feed on Quercus coccifera and Quercus ilex. They mine the leaves of their host plant. The mine is found on the upperside of the leaf.
