= Phyllonorycter myricae =

Scientific classification
- Kingdom: Animalia
- Phylum: Arthropoda
- Class: Insecta
- Order: Lepidoptera
- Family: Gracillariidae
- Genus: Phyllonorycter
- Species: P. myricae

Binomial name
- Phyllonorycter myricae Deschka, 1976

Species of moth

Phyllonorycter myricae is a moth of the family Gracillariidae. It is native to Madeira and the Canary Islands. In 2000, it was studied in Hawaii as a potential biological control agent for Myrica faya.

The larvae feed on Myrica faya. They mine the leaves of their host plant.
