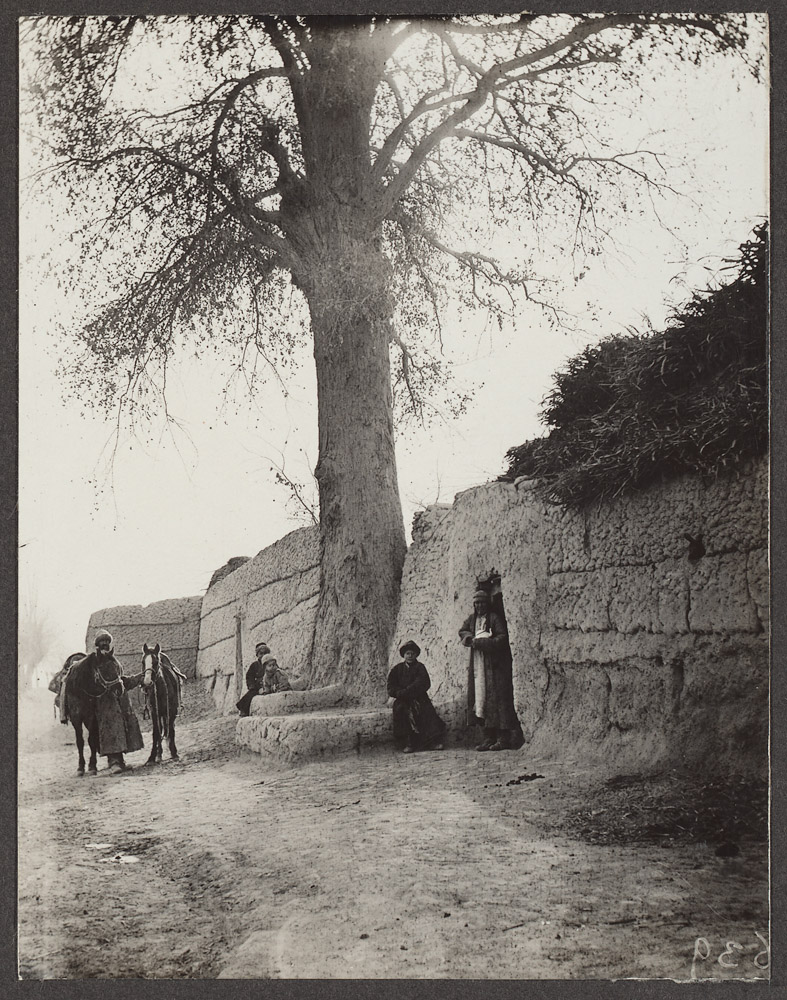
- In Yarkant County, Xinjiang, China, 1910

Conservation status
- Near Threatened (IUCN 3.1)

Scientific classification
- Kingdom: Plantae
- Clade: Tracheophytes
- Clade: Angiosperms
- Clade: Eudicots
- Clade: Rosids
- Order: Malpighiales
- Family: Salicaceae
- Genus: Populus
- Species: P. pruinosa

Binomial name
- Populus pruinosa Schrenk

Synonyms
- Balsamiflua euphratica f. pruinosa (Schrenk) N.Chao & J.Liu; Balsamiflua pruinosa (Schrenk) Kimura; Turanga pruinosa (Schrenk) Kimura

= Populus pruinosa =

Species of plant

Populus pruinosa is a species of flowering plant in the family Salicaceae, native to Central Asia, Afghanistan, and Xinjiang in China. A halophytic tree usually 10 m (33 ft) tall, but occasionally reaching 20 m (66 ft), it is often found growing in basins. Its bark is grayish-yellow, its branchlets and young sprouts are densely tomentulose and gray in color, and its leaves are tomentulose and grayish-blue. The genome of this species has been sequenced revealing that duplicated genes and the expansion of certain gene families in Populus pruinosa contributed to adaptation to extreme desert environments characterized by high salinity and drought.
