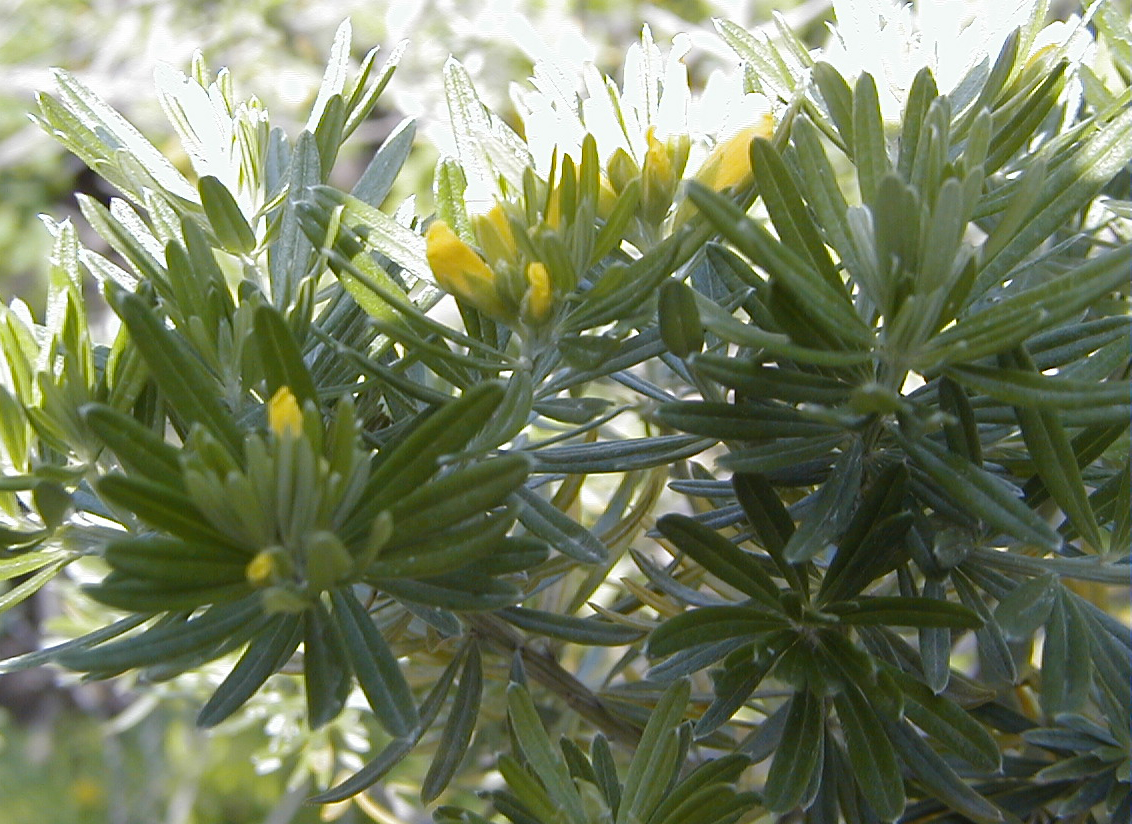

Scientific classification
- Kingdom: Plantae
- Clade: Tracheophytes
- Clade: Angiosperms
- Clade: Eudicots
- Clade: Rosids
- Order: Fabales
- Family: Fabaceae
- Subfamily: Faboideae
- Genus: Genista
- Species: G. linifolia

Binomial name
- Genista linifolia L.

Synonyms
- Cytisus linifolius Teline linifolia

= Genista linifolia =

Species of flowering plant

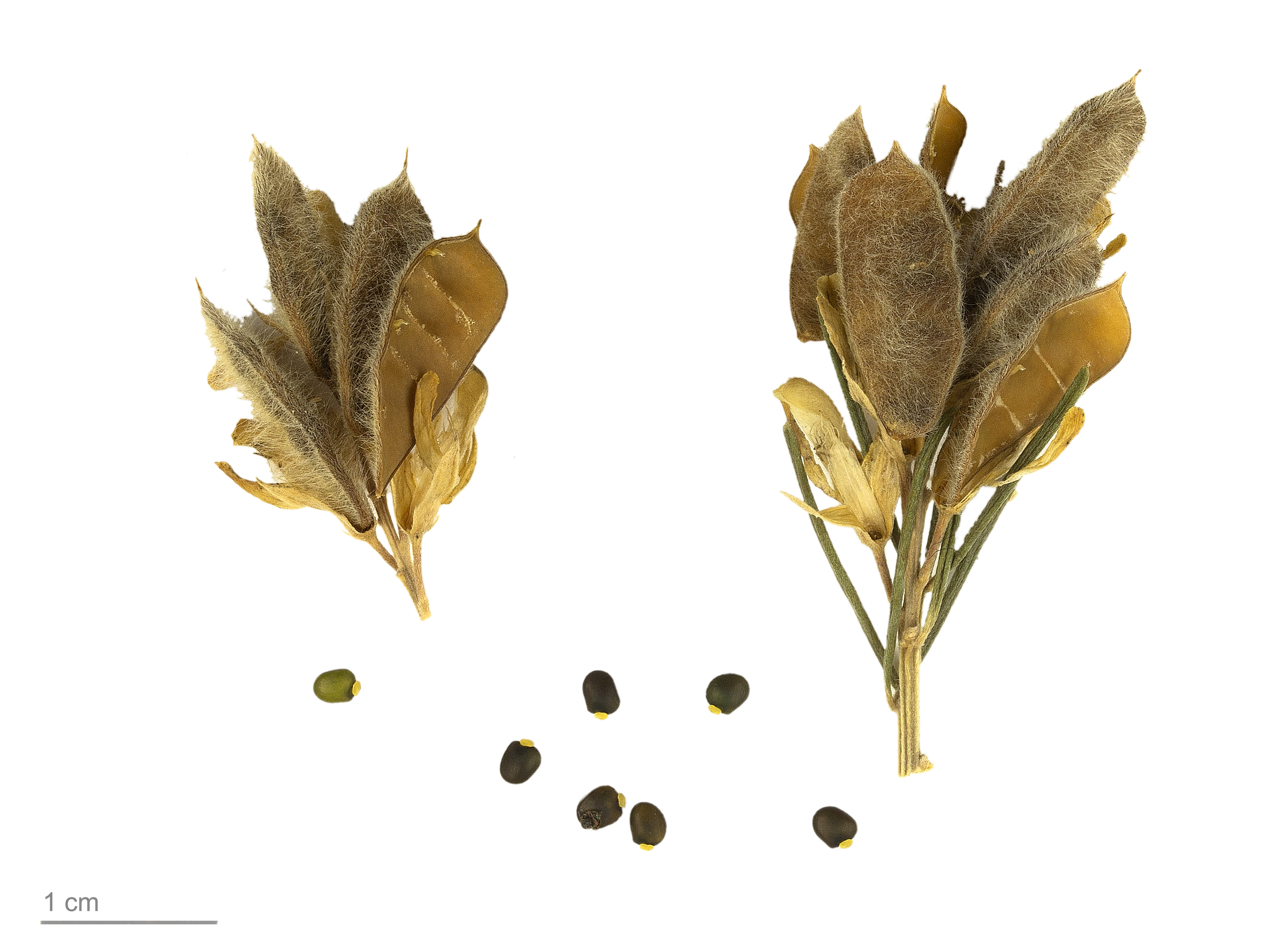
Genista linifolia MHNT

Genista linifolia is a species of broom known by the common names Mediterranean broom, needle-leaved broom and flax broom. It is native to southwestern Europe, North Africa, and the Canary Islands.

== Description ==
This is a shrub with hairy green stems and branches which can exceed two meters in height. Its leaves are made up of tough, green, lance-shaped leaflets with woolly undersides. Flowers appear in dense raceme inflorescences toward the ends of the branches. The flowers are bright yellow and pealike. The fruit is a hairy legume pod one to four centimeters long containing several seeds.

== Invasive plant species ==
It can be found on other continents in areas of similar Mediterranean climate, such as California in the United States, Australia and New Zealand. It has become an invasive species in those regions.
