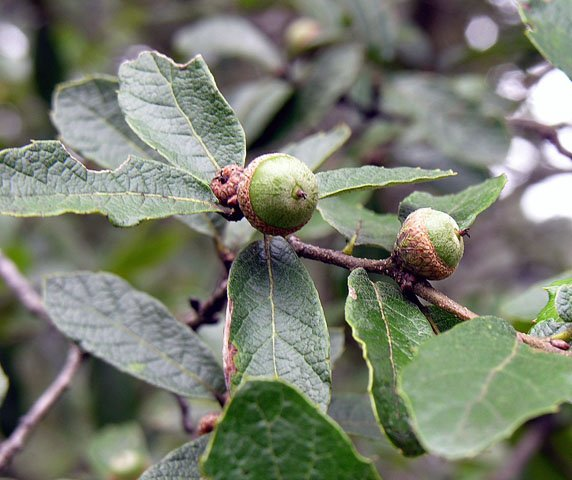

Conservation status
- Least Concern (IUCN 3.1)

Scientific classification
- Kingdom: Plantae
- Clade: Embryophytes
- Clade: Tracheophytes
- Clade: Spermatophytes
- Clade: Angiosperms
- Clade: Eudicots
- Clade: Rosids
- Order: Fagales
- Family: Fagaceae
- Genus: Quercus
- Subgenus: Quercus subg. Quercus
- Section: Quercus sect. Lobatae
- Species: Q. castanea

Binomial name
- Quercus castanea Née

Synonyms
- List: Quercus alamosensis Trel.; Quercus axillaris E.Fourn. ex Trel.; Quercus circummontana Trel.; Quercus consociata Trel.; Quercus crassivenosa Trel.; Quercus impressa Trel.; Quercus lanigera M.Martens & Galeotti; Quercus mucronata Willd.; Quercus pulchella Bonpl.; Quercus rossii Trel.; Quercus scherzeri Trel.; Quercus seleri Trel.; Quercus serrulata Trel.; Quercus simillima Trel.; Quercus spathulistipula Trel.; Quercus subcrispata Trel.; Quercus tepoxuchilensis Trel.; Quercus tristis Liebm.; Quercus verrucosirama Trel.

= Quercus castanea =

Species of oak tree

Quercus castanea is a species of oak tree. It is widespread across much of Mexico, from Sonora to Chiapas, and in Central America.

== Description ==
It is a deciduous tree up to 15 metres (49 feet) tall with a trunk as much as 80 cm (31 in) in diameter. The leaves are thick and leathery, up to 11.6 cm (4 1/2 in) long, and elliptical with numerous pointed teeth along the edges. It flowers from March to June, and its acorns mature between October and December.

The species hybridizes with other sympatric red oak species across its range.

== Distribution and habitat ==
Quercus castanea is native to the mountains of Mexico, Guatemala, El Salvador, and Honduras. In Mexico, the species inhabits the Sierra Madre Oriental, Sierra Madre Occidental, Trans-Mexican Volcanic Belt, Sierra Madre de Oaxaca, and Sierra Madre del Sur between 1,400 and 2,600 m (4,600 and 8,500 ft) elevation. It also inhabits the Sierra Madre de Chiapas of Mexico Mexico and Guatemala, and the Montecristo Massif where the borders of El Salvador, Guatemala, and Honduras meet. In Guatemala, Q. castanea has been reported up to 3,500 m (11,500 ft) elevation. The species' estimated extent of occurrence is 1,110,000 square kilometres (430,000 sq mi), based on over 500 collections and herbarium records.

The species is found in a variety of montane habitats. It is common in dry oak forests, xerophytic shrublands, and open oak woodlands alongside cacti and trees of family Leguminaceae. It also grows in humid montane cloud forests.

In the Cuitzeo Basin of central Mexico, acorn woodpeckers (Melanerpes formicivorus) and golden-fronted woodpeckers (Melanerpes aurifrons) are important acorn dispersers.

== Gallery ==
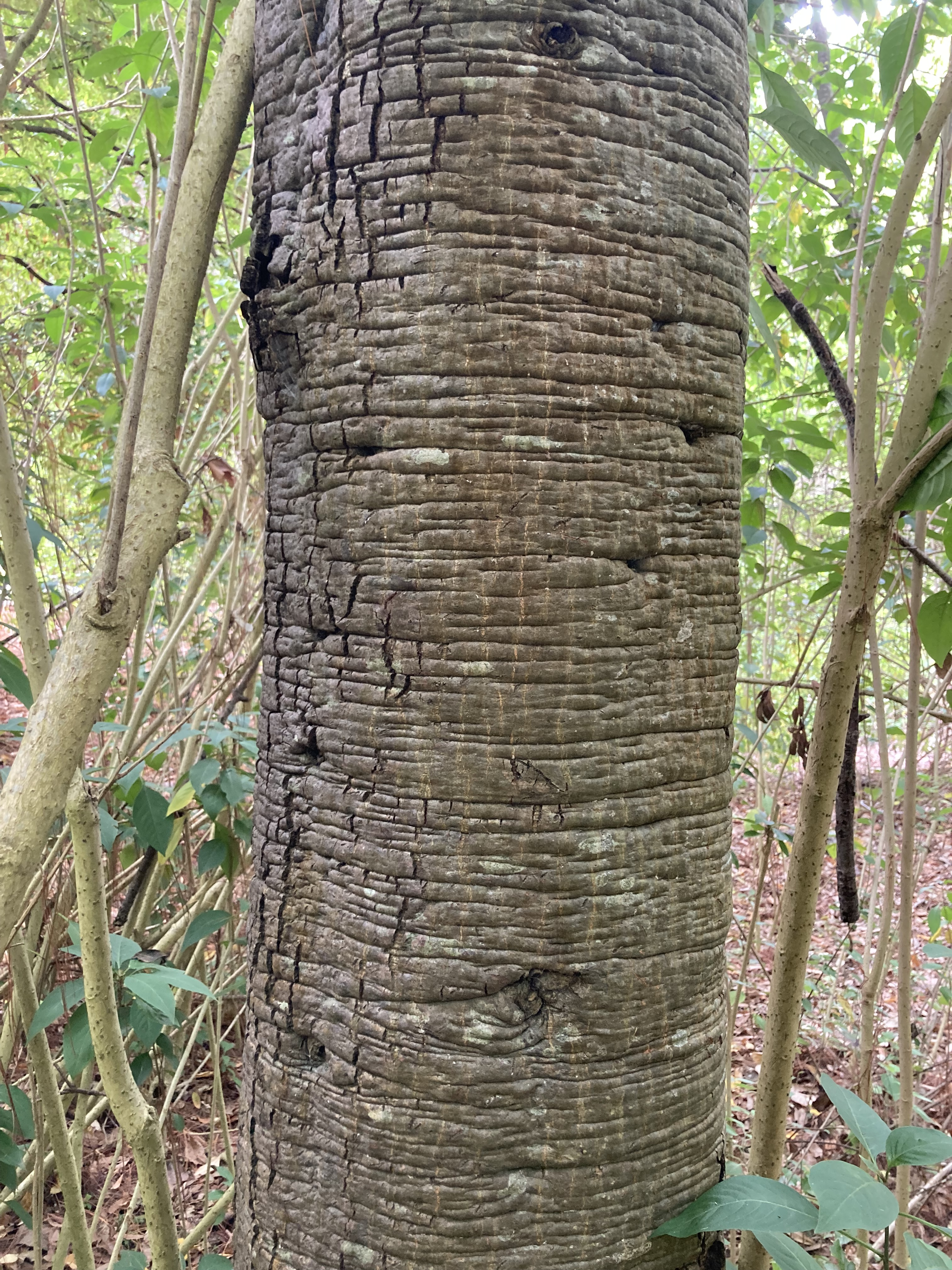
Q. castanea bark at the Berkeley Botanical Garden
