= Jacob Boll =

- Born: May 28, 1828; Würenlos, Switzerland
- Died: September 29, 1880 (aged 52); Wilbarger County, Texas, US
- Scientific career
- Fields: Paleontology, Entomology

Jacob Boll (28 May 1828 – 29 September 1880) was a Swiss naturalist and entomologist especially noted for his exploration of the Texas Red Beds.

Boll was born 1828 in Würenlos, Switzerland, and educated as a pharmacist in Switzerland and Germany. Established as a naturalist, he turned his attention to microlepidoptera and established contact with Philipp Christoph Zeller. In 1856, his parents and siblings travelled to Texas and joined the La Réunion socialist utopian community. The Bolls left the commune after the first year and established a farm in Dallas near the current Baylor Medical Center. Jacob visited his family in Texas circa 1867, and then returned to Switzerland.

In 1869 he met with Louis Agassiz at Harvard, proceeding to Texas to collect animals for the Harvard Museum of Comparative Zoology. Returning to Switzerland he became a professional collector, working for Eduard Dämle and the Swiss government. Similar arrangements were made with Agassiz and in 1870 he collected insects in New England.

Boll settled permanently in the U.S. after his wife Henriette (Humbel)s' death in 1873. He lived in Dallas. In 1878 he collected Permian vertebrate fossils in northwest Texas for Edward Drinker Cope of Philadelphia. These collections are now in the American Museum of Natural History.

Boll published a number of papers in botany, entomology, and geology. He was a Member of the Boston Society of Natural History and the Academia Caesarea Leopoldino-Carolina Naturae Curiosorum.

In 1880, Boll died in Wilbarger County, Texas, United States, of a snake bite, and was buried at Greenwood Cemetery in Dallas.

Another entomologist of the same period also specialising in Lepidoptera, Ernst Friedrich August Boll, has the same surname.
