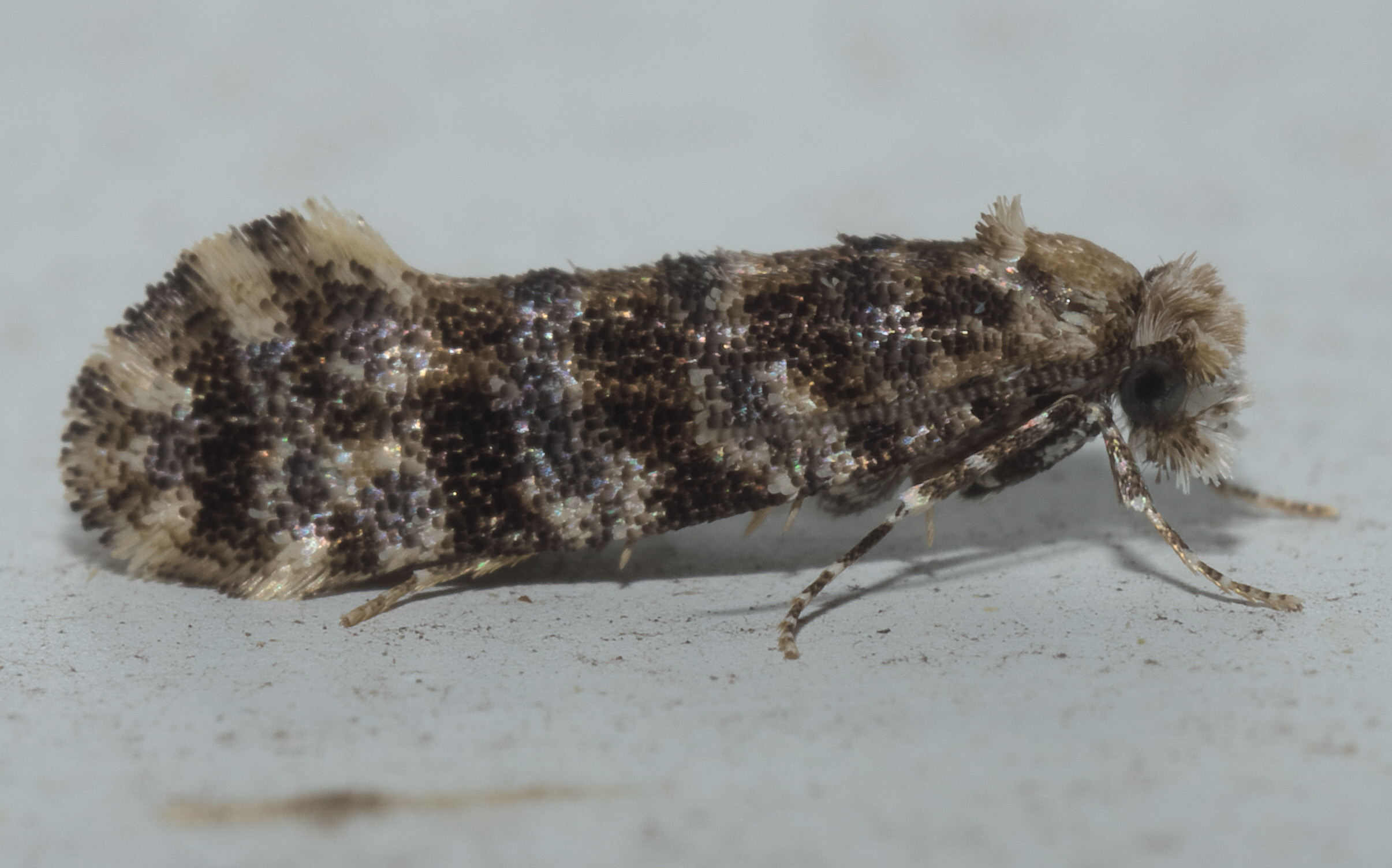

Scientific classification
- Kingdom: Animalia
- Phylum: Arthropoda
- Clade: Pancrustacea
- Class: Insecta
- Order: Lepidoptera
- Family: Tineidae
- Genus: Xylesthia; Clemens, 1859

= Xylesthia =

Genus of moths

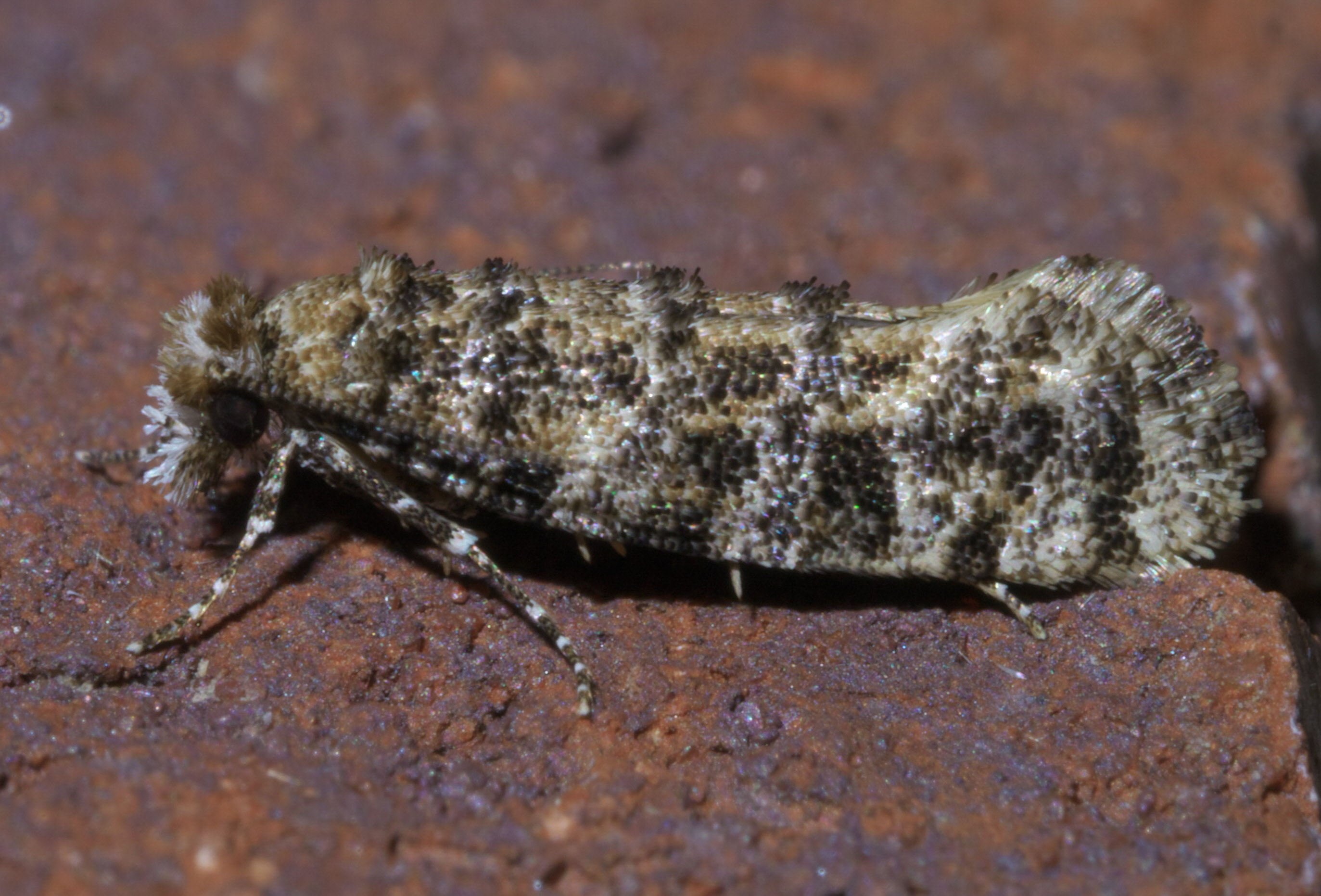
Xylesthia pruniramiella, speckled xylesthia moth

Xylesthia is a genus of moths belonging to the family Tineidae.

== Species ==
- Xylesthia albicans Braun, 1923
- Xylesthia horridula Zeller, 1877
- Xylesthia menidias Meyrick, 1922
- Xylesthia pruniramiella Clemens, 1859
