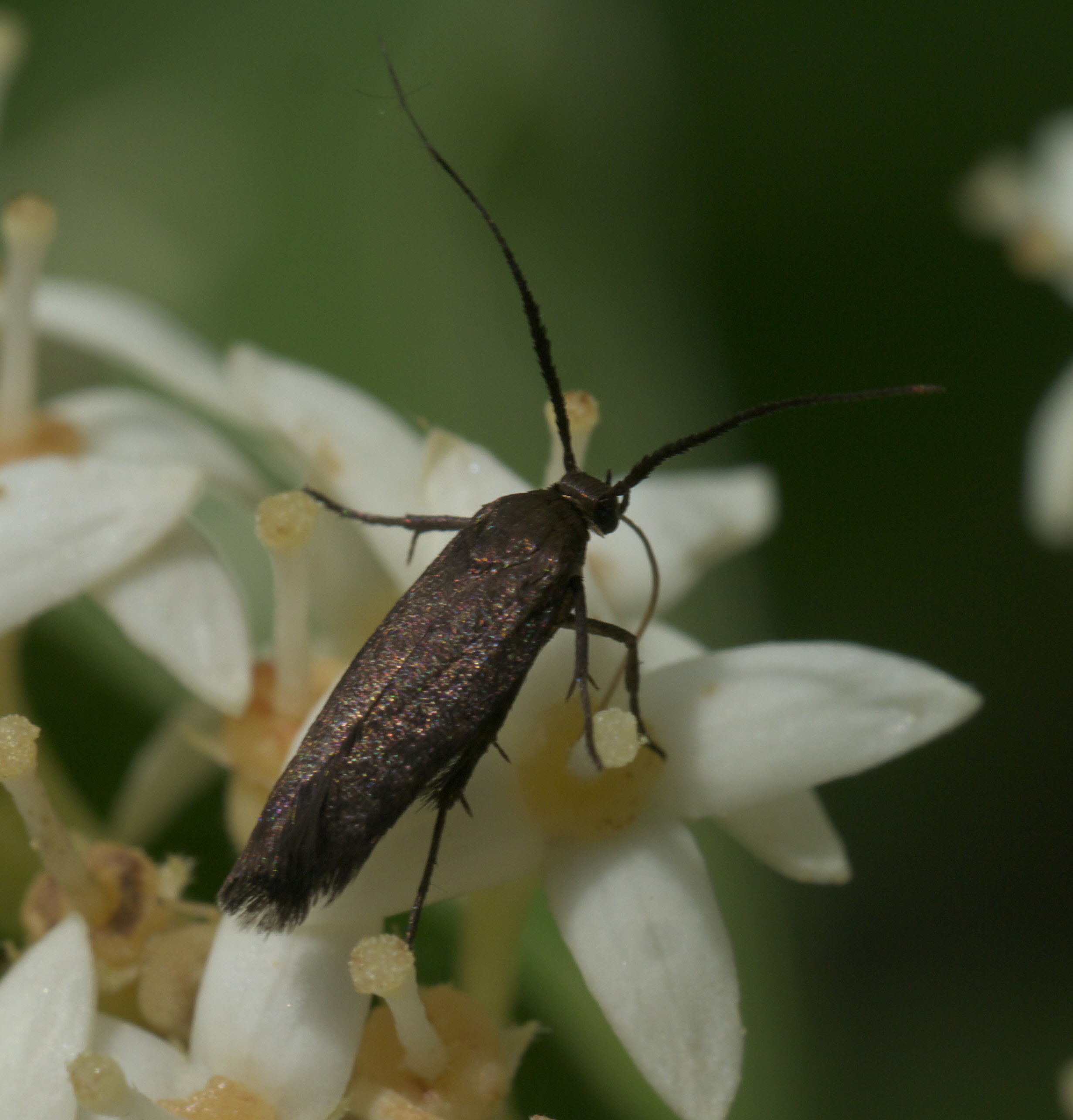

Scientific classification
- Kingdom: Animalia
- Phylum: Arthropoda
- Clade: Pancrustacea
- Class: Insecta
- Order: Lepidoptera
- Family: Scythrididae
- Genus: Scythris
- Species: S. fuscicomella

Binomial name
- Scythris fuscicomella Clemens, 1860

= Scythris fuscicomella =

Species of moth

Scythris fuscicomella is a species of flower moth in the family Scythrididae.

The MONA or Hodges number for Scythris fuscicomella is 1659.
