= Ectypia bivittata =

Scientific classification
- Domain: Eukaryota
- Kingdom: Animalia
- Phylum: Arthropoda
- Class: Insecta
- Order: Lepidoptera
- Superfamily: Noctuoidea
- Family: Erebidae
- Subfamily: Arctiinae
- Genus: Ectypia
- Species: E. bivittata

Binomial name
- Ectypia bivittata Clemens, 1861

Synonyms
- Ectypia bivittata Clemens, 1861; Spilosoma nigroflava Graef, 1887

Species of moth

Ectypia bivittata, the two-banded ectypia, is a moth of the family Erebidae. It was described by James Brackenridge Clemens in 1861. It is found in the United States from Arizona to Texas and Colorado.

The wingspan is 46 mm. Adults are on wing from February to September.
