= Coleophora rosacella =

Scientific classification
- Kingdom: Animalia
- Phylum: Arthropoda
- Clade: Pancrustacea
- Class: Insecta
- Order: Lepidoptera
- Family: Coleophoridae
- Genus: Coleophora
- Species: C. rosacella

Binomial name
- Coleophora rosacella Clemens, 1864

Species of moth

Coleophora rosacella is a moth of the family Coleophoridae. It is found in North America, including Pennsylvania, New Brunswick and Nova Scotia.

The larvae feed on the buds of Rosa species. They create a tubular leaf case.
