= Aristotelia pudibundella =

Scientific classification
- Kingdom: Animalia
- Phylum: Arthropoda
- Clade: Pancrustacea
- Class: Insecta
- Order: Lepidoptera
- Family: Gelechiidae
- Genus: Aristotelia
- Species: A. pudibundella

Binomial name
- Aristotelia pudibundella (Zeller, 1873)

Synonyms
- Gelechia (Ergatis) pudibundella Zeller, 1873; Gelechia intermediella Chambers, 1878

Species of moth

Aristotelia pudibundella is a moth of the family Gelechiidae. It was described by Philipp Christoph Zeller in 1873. It is found on Haiti and St. Croix and in the United States, where it has been recorded from Alabama, Kansas, Louisiana, Maine, Mississippi, New Hampshire, Oklahoma, Quebec, Tennessee and Texas.

Adults are similar to Aristotelia roseosuffusella, but the forewings are much less roseate, frequently showing no tinge of the roseate hue. The first dark band does not cover the base of the wing and the second band is like that of roseosuffusella, but the third extends across the wing, the dorsal portion being, however, paler than the costal, and the costo-apical part of the wing is ochreous-fuscous.

The larvae feed on Malus species and Acacia farnesiana.
