= Trypanisma =

Scientific classification
- Domain: Eukaryota
- Kingdom: Animalia
- Phylum: Arthropoda
- Class: Insecta
- Order: Lepidoptera
- Family: Gelechiidae
- Tribe: Gelechiini
- Genus: Trypanisma; Clemens, 1860

Genus of moths

Trypanisma is a genus of moths in the family Gelechiidae.

== Species ==
- Trypanisma prudens (Clemens, 1860)
