= Antaeotricha unipunctella =

Scientific classification
- Kingdom: Animalia
- Phylum: Arthropoda
- Clade: Pancrustacea
- Class: Insecta
- Order: Lepidoptera
- Family: Depressariidae
- Genus: Antaeotricha
- Species: A. unipunctella

Binomial name
- Antaeotricha unipunctella (Clemens, 1863)

Synonyms
- Brachiloma unipunctella Clemens, 1863; Cryptolechia lithosina Zeller, 1873; Harpalyce tortricella Chambers, 1874

Species of moth

Antaeotricha unipunctella is a moth in the family Depressariidae. It was described by James Brackenridge Clemens in 1863. It is found in North America, where it has been recorded from Alabama, Arizona, Florida, Illinois, Indiana, Louisiana, Maine, Massachusetts, Mississippi, South Carolina, Tennessee and Texas.

The wingspan is 20–22 mm. The forewings are stramineous (straw colored) with the discal cell with or without one or two brownish dots apically. The hindwings are white.

The larvae feed on Quercus species.
