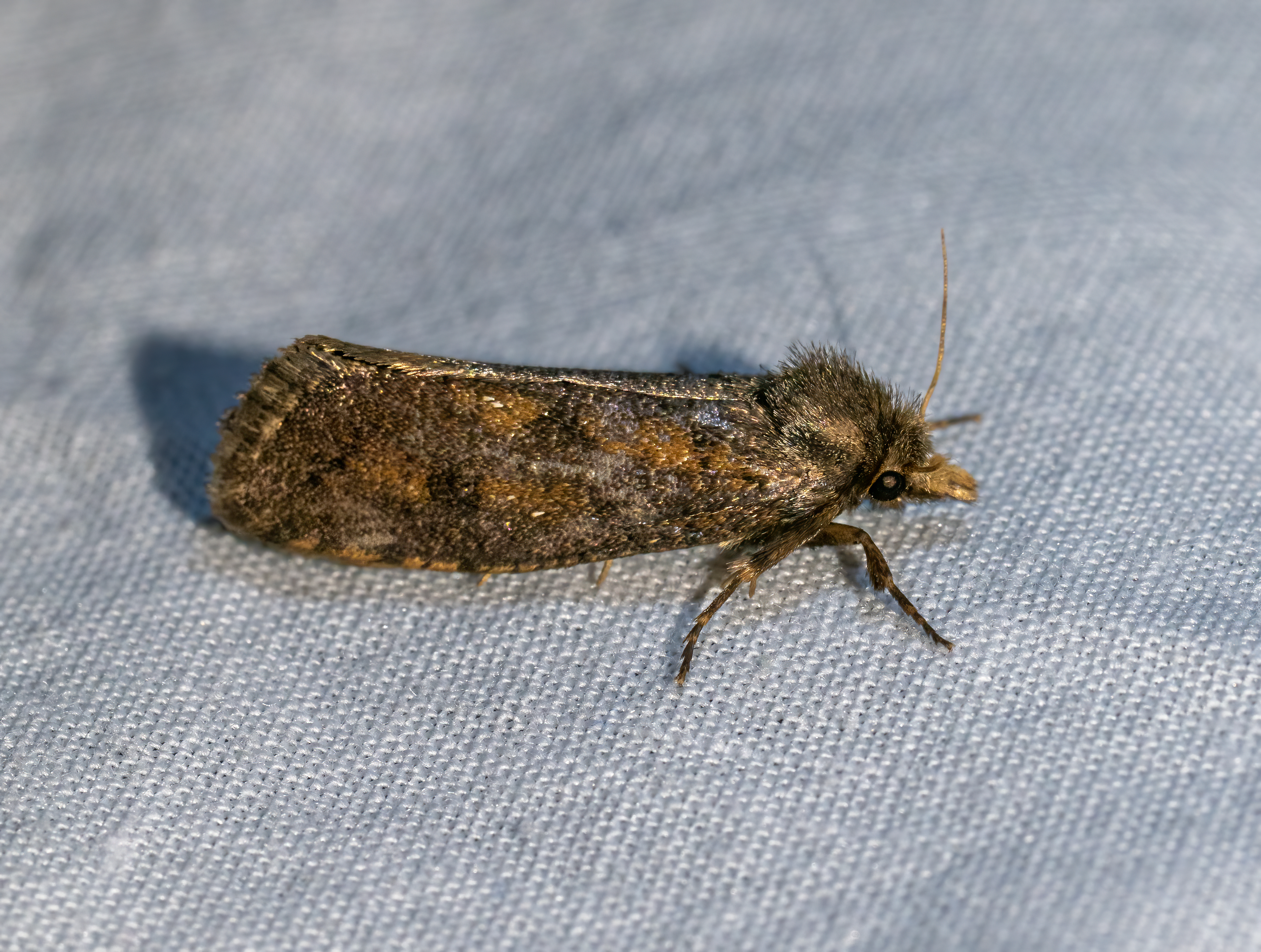

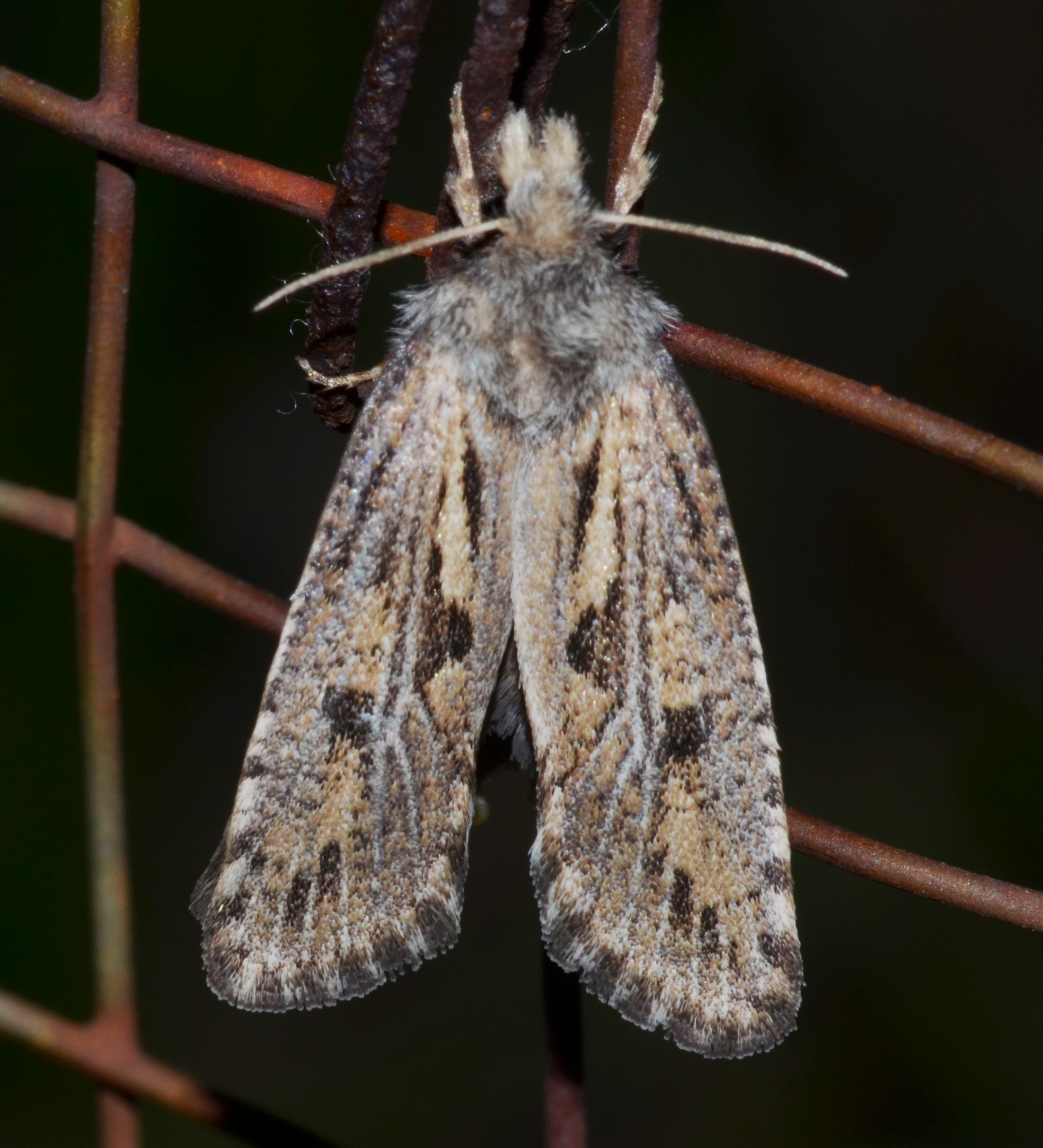

Scientific classification
- Kingdom: Animalia
- Phylum: Arthropoda
- Clade: Pancrustacea
- Class: Insecta
- Order: Lepidoptera
- Family: Tineidae
- Genus: Acrolophus
- Species: A. popeanella

Binomial name
- Acrolophus popeanella (Clemens, 1859)

Synonyms
- Anaphora popeanella Clemens, 1859; Anaphora agrotipennella Grote, 1872; Anaphora scardina Zeller, 1873; Anaphora morrisoni Walsingham, 1887; Anaphora confusellus Dyar, 1900

= Acrolophus popeanella =

Clemens' grass tubeworm moth

Species of moth

Acrolophus popeanella (Clemens' grass tubeworm moth) is a moth of the family Acrolophidae. It was described by James Brackenridge Clemens in 1859.

== Description ==
Adults of Acrolophus popleanella have dark brown wings with lighter brown blotches and a striped pattern near the lowermost margin of the forewings. Their wings are held folded in a tent-like formation over their bodies when at rest. They have a wingspan of 24-33 mm and are 11 to 14 mm long. A tuft of elongated, hairlike scales give them a "helmeted" appearance.

== Range and Habitat ==
A. popeanella is found in the eastern United States, from New Jersey and Ohio south to Florida and west to Illinois, Nebraska and Texas. They are commonly observed in a variety of environments, including grasslands, agricultural areas and urban environments.

== Ecology ==
The larvae feed on the roots of Trifolium pratense.
