= Coleophora cretaticostella =

Scientific classification
- Kingdom: Animalia
- Phylum: Arthropoda
- Clade: Pancrustacea
- Class: Insecta
- Order: Lepidoptera
- Family: Coleophoridae
- Genus: Coleophora
- Species: C. cretaticostella

Binomial name
- Coleophora cretaticostella Clemens, 1860

Species of moth

Coleophora cretaticostella is a moth of the family Coleophoridae. It is found in North America, including Ohio, Pennsylvania and Ontario.

The wingspan is about 11 mm.

The larvae feed on the buds of Rubus species. They create a composite leaf case.
