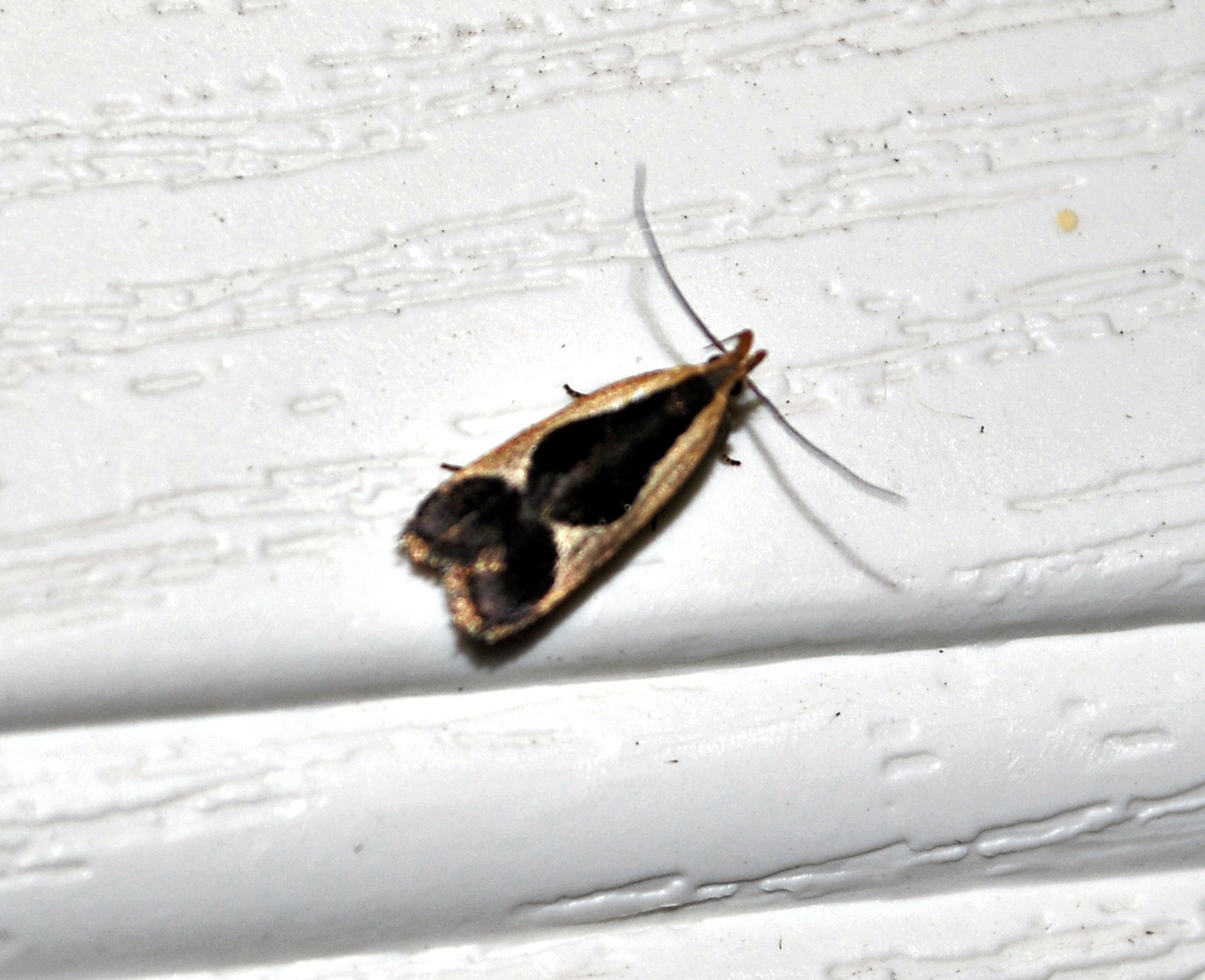

Scientific classification
- Kingdom: Animalia
- Phylum: Arthropoda
- Clade: Pancrustacea
- Class: Insecta
- Order: Lepidoptera
- Family: Gelechiidae
- Genus: Dichomeris
- Species: D. flavocostella

Binomial name
- Dichomeris flavocostella (Clemens, 1860)

Synonyms
- Gelechia flavocostella Clemens, 1860

= Dichomeris flavocostella =

Cream-edged dichomeris moth

Species of moth

Dichomeris flavocostella, the cream-edged dichomeris moth, is a moth in the family Gelechiidae. It was described by James Brackenridge Clemens in 1860. It is found in North America, where it has been recorded from southern Quebec and Maine to Florida, west to Texas and north to Manitoba.

The wingspan is 15–18 mm. Adults are on wing from May to August.

The larvae feed on Solidago and Aster species.
