= Trypanisma prudens =

Scientific classification
- Kingdom: Animalia
- Phylum: Arthropoda
- Clade: Pancrustacea
- Class: Insecta
- Order: Lepidoptera
- Family: Gelechiidae
- Genus: Trypanisma
- Species: T. prudens

Binomial name
- Trypanisma prudens Clemens, 1860

Synonyms
- Gelechia quinqueannulella Chambers, 1872; Trypanisma fagella Busck, 1903

Species of moth

Trypanisma prudens is a moth of the family Gelechiidae. It was described by James Brackenridge Clemens in 1860. It is found in North America, where it has been recorded from Alabama, Arkansas, Florida, Illinois, Indiana, Kentucky, Louisiana, Maine, Michigan, Mississippi, Oklahoma, Pennsylvania, South Carolina and Tennessee.

The wingspan is about 9 mm. The forewings are yellowish white, but thickly suffused with black and gray scales, so that the wings look light gray to the naked eye. At the middle of the cell is a circular group of dense black scales, followed by a patch of yellow, with only slight dark sprinkling. At the beginning of costal cilia is a nearly black large outwardly directed streak, and on the dorsal side opposite a small corresponding black patch. These black markings are edged broadly on the outside with unsprinkled yellow. The hindwings are light silvery grey.

The larvae feed on Quercus and Fagus species. Pupation takes place in a slight web on the underside of a leaf, which is drawn into a shallow fold.
