= Elachista maculoscella =

Scientific classification
- Kingdom: Animalia
- Phylum: Arthropoda
- Clade: Pancrustacea
- Class: Insecta
- Order: Lepidoptera
- Family: Elachistidae
- Genus: Elachista
- Species: E. maculoscella

Binomial name
- Elachista maculoscella (Clemens, 1860)

Synonyms
- Cosmiotes maculoscella Clemens, 1860; Elachista unifasciella Chambers, 1875; Elachista nitidiuscula Braun, 1948

Species of moth

Elachista maculoscella is a moth of the family Elachistidae. It is found in North America, where it has been recorded from Manitoba, Ontario, Massachusetts, Ohio and Pennsylvania.

The wingspan is 6.5–7 mm. Adults have been recorded on wing in July.
