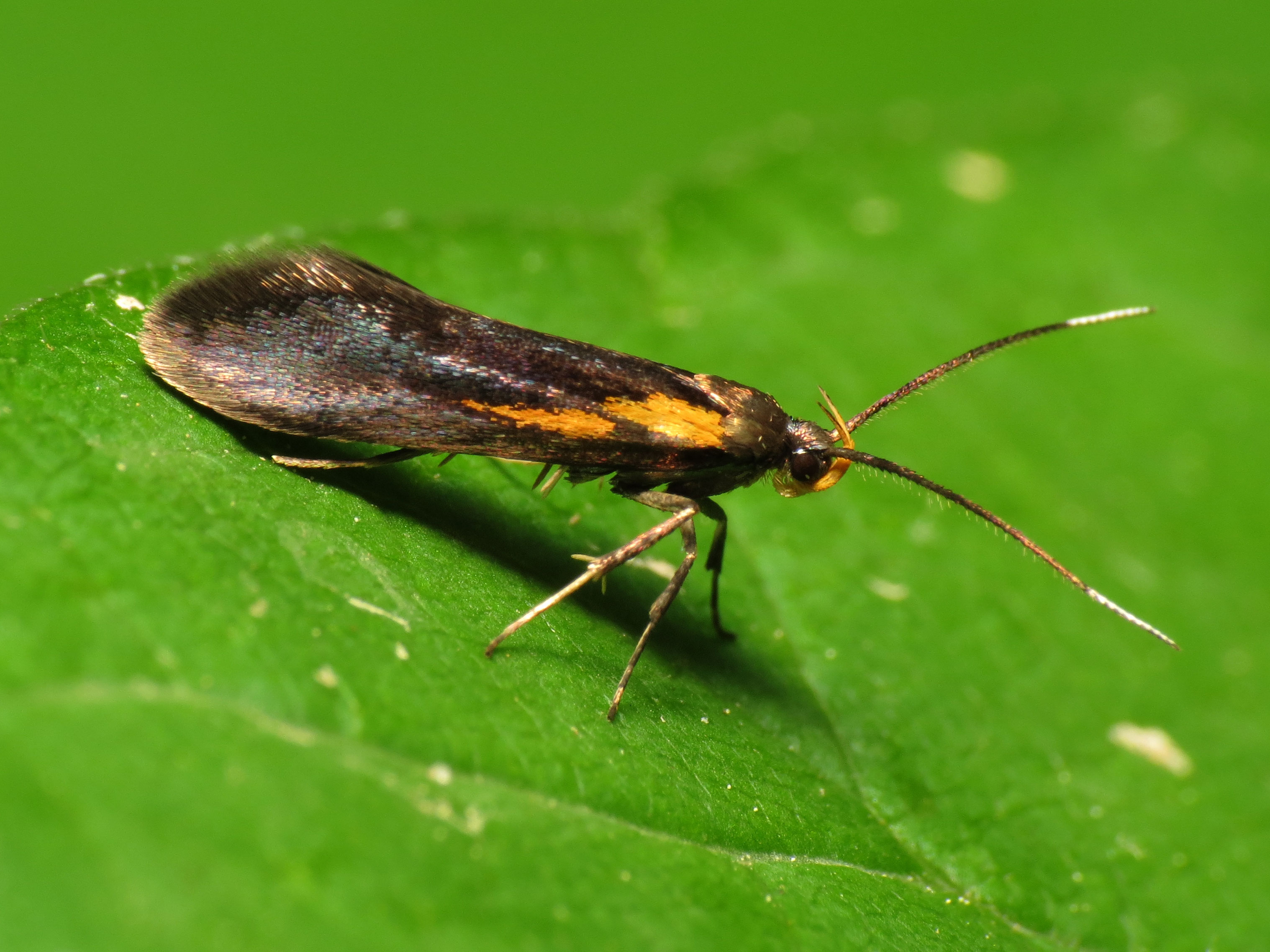

Scientific classification
- Kingdom: Animalia
- Phylum: Arthropoda
- Clade: Pancrustacea
- Class: Insecta
- Order: Lepidoptera
- Family: Oecophoridae
- Genus: Mathildana
- Species: M. newmanella

Binomial name
- Mathildana newmanella Clemens, 1864

= Mathildana newmanella =

Species of moth

Mathildana newmanella, or Newman's mathildana moth, is a species of concealer moth in the family Oecophoridae.

The MONA or Hodges number for Mathildana newmanella is 1059.

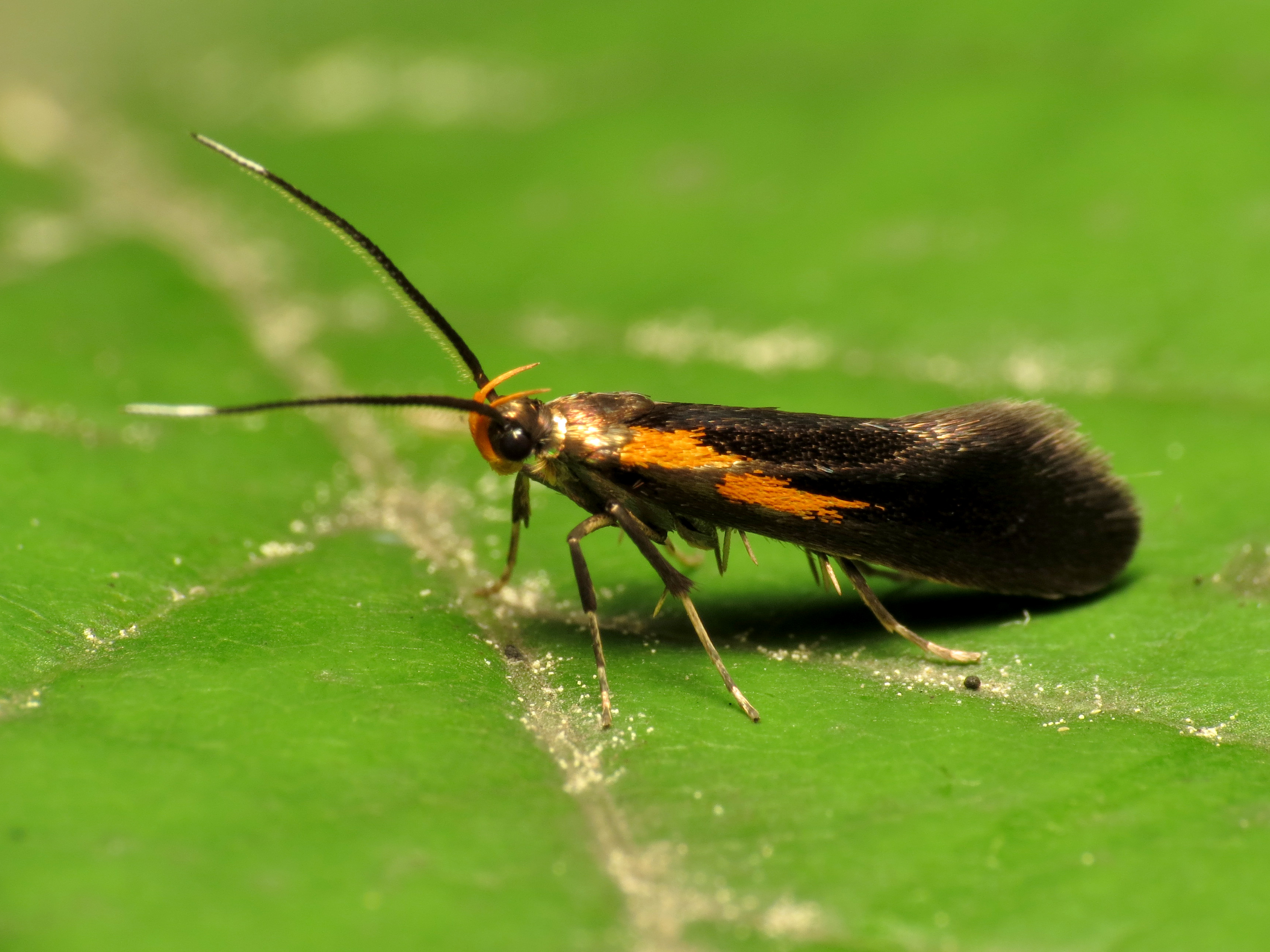
Newman's mathildana moth, Mathildana newmanella
