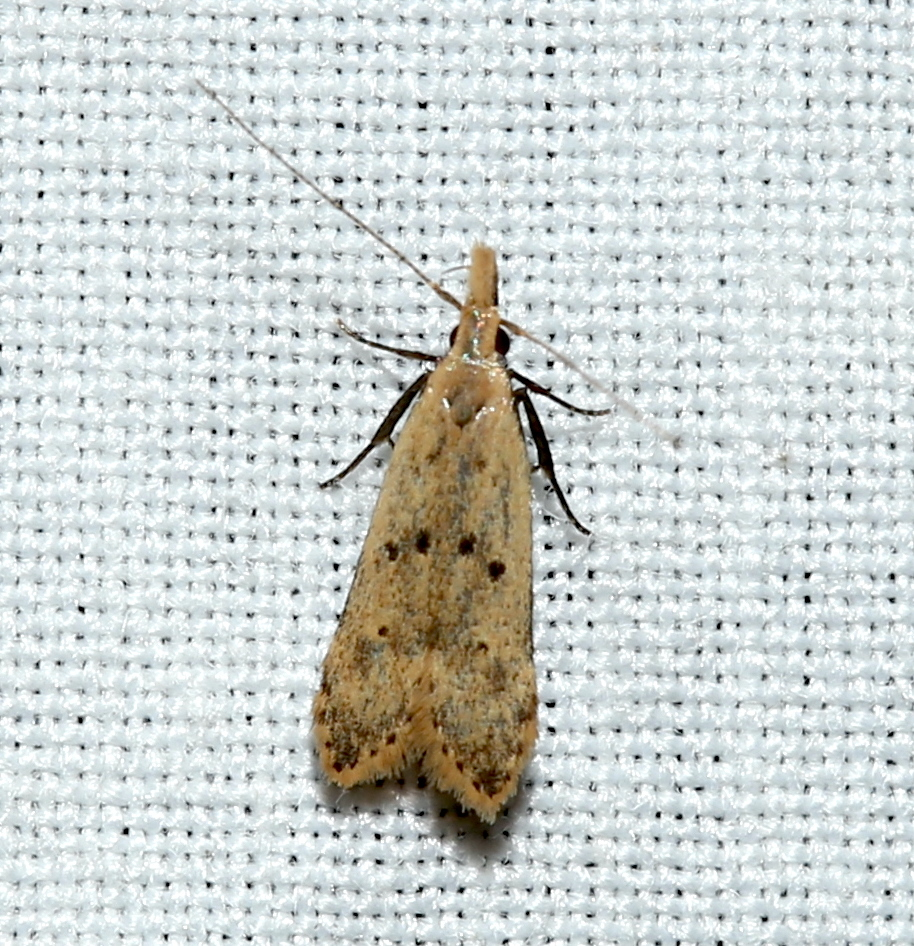

Scientific classification
- Kingdom: Animalia
- Phylum: Arthropoda
- Clade: Pancrustacea
- Class: Insecta
- Order: Lepidoptera
- Family: Gelechiidae
- Genus: Dichomeris
- Species: D. punctipennella

Binomial name
- Dichomeris punctipennella (Clemens, 1860)

Synonyms
- Anorthosia punctipennella Clemens, 1860; Sagaritis gracilella Chambers, 1872

= Dichomeris punctipennella =

Many-spotted dichomeris moth

Species of moth

Dichomeris punctipennella, the many-spotted dichomeris moth, is a moth of the family Gelechiidae. It is found in the United States, including Alabama, Maine, Maryland, Massachusetts, New Hampshire, Tennessee, Texas and Virginia.
