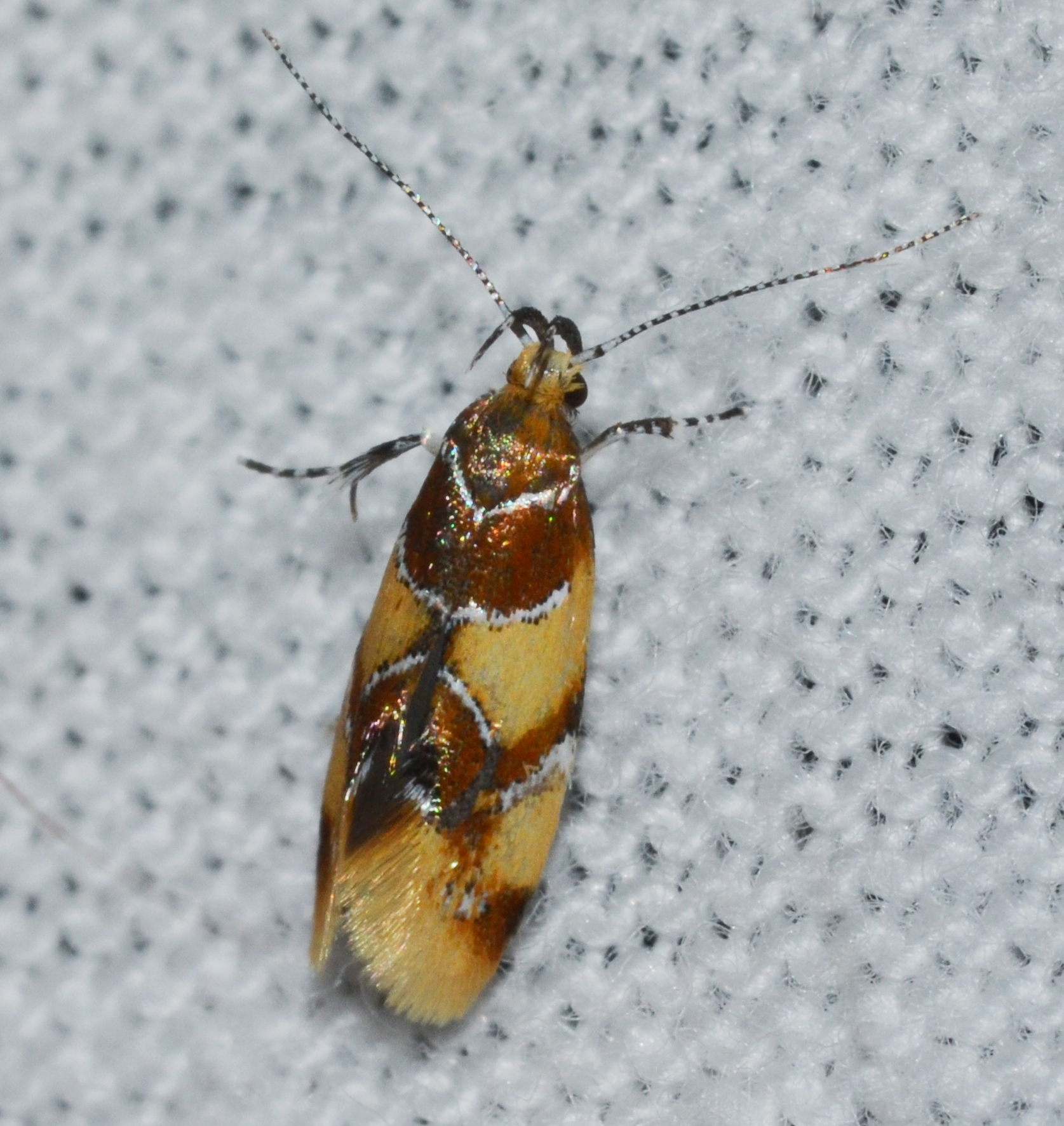

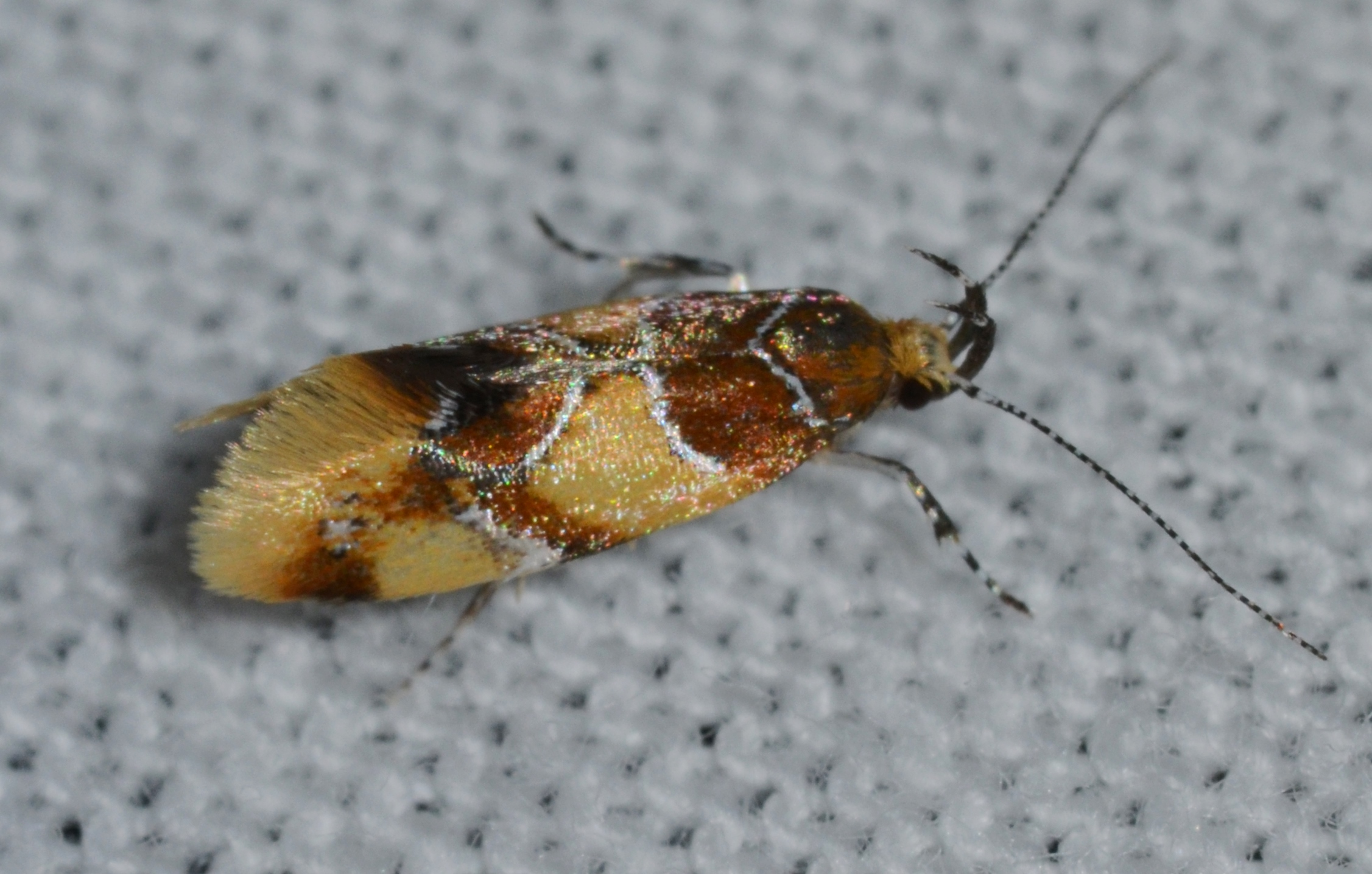

Scientific classification
- Kingdom: Animalia
- Phylum: Arthropoda
- Clade: Pancrustacea
- Class: Insecta
- Order: Lepidoptera
- Family: Oecophoridae
- Genus: Epicallima
- Species: E. argenticinctella

Binomial name
- Epicallima argenticinctella (Clemens, 1860)

Synonyms
- Callima argenticinctella Clemens, 1860

= Epicallima argenticinctella =

Species of moth

Epicallima argenticinctella, the orange-headed epicallima moth, is a moth of the family Oecophoridae. It is found in North America, where it has been recorded from Nova Scotia to South Carolina, west to Kansas and Texas. The habitat consists of deciduous forests.

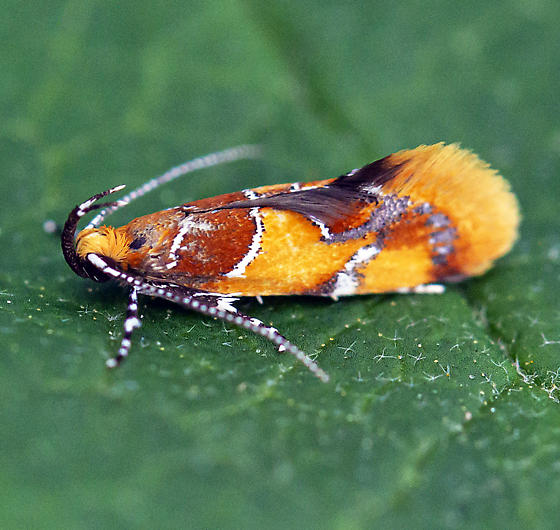
Orange-headed Epicallima - Hodges#1046 (Callima argenticinctella) lateral view

The wingspan is 10–13 mm. The forewings are yellowish-orange with a silvery black-margined line along the basal margin from the fold to the basal angle. There is a similar line from the basal third of the inner margin to the costa. The basal area between these lines is deep reddish orange. The hindwings are fuscous. Adults are on wing from April to October.
