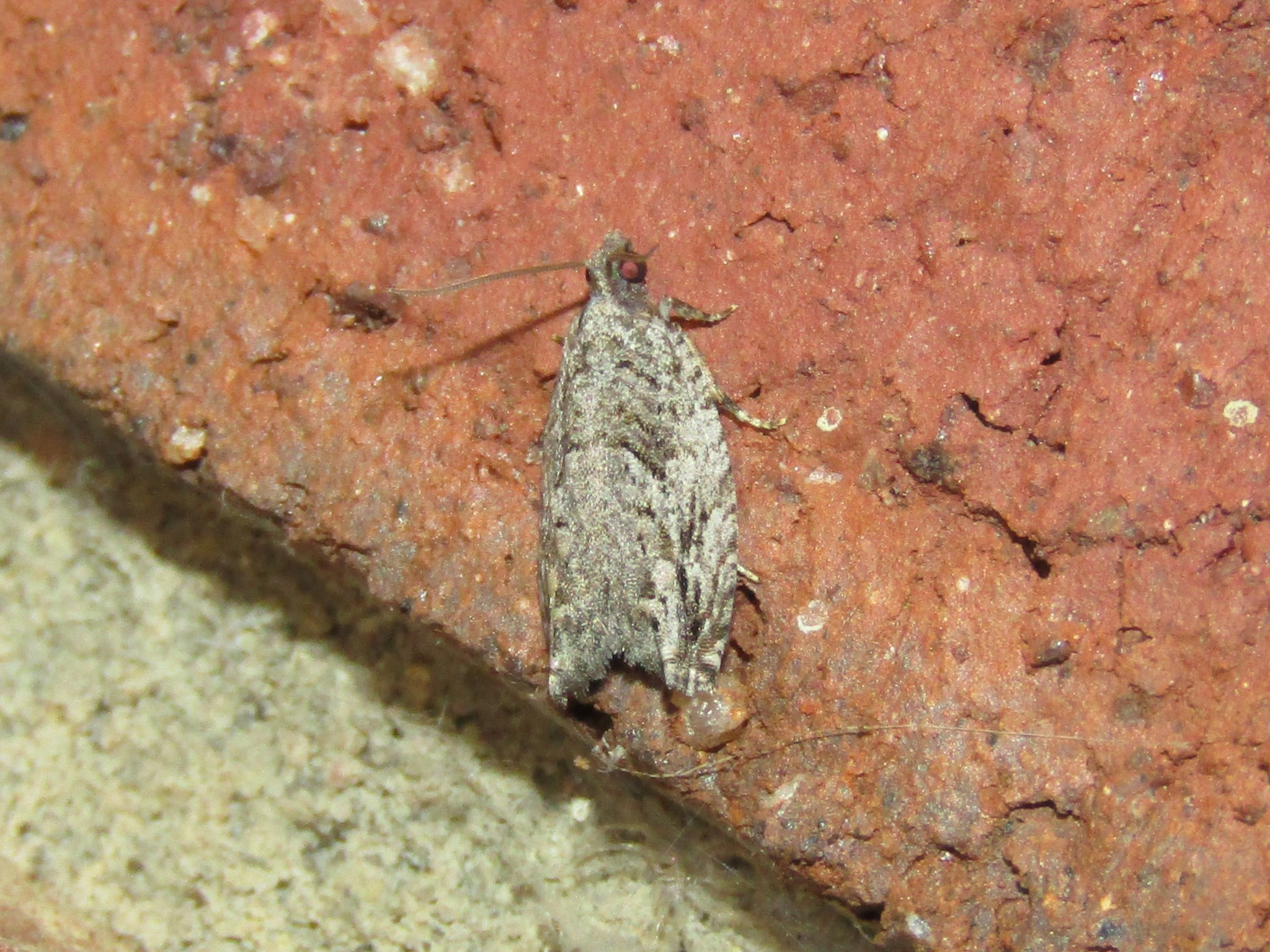

Scientific classification
- Kingdom: Animalia
- Phylum: Arthropoda
- Clade: Pancrustacea
- Class: Insecta
- Order: Lepidoptera
- Family: Tortricidae
- Genus: Gretchena
- Species: G. deludana

Binomial name
- Gretchena deludana (Clemens, 1864)

= Gretchena deludana =

Species of moth

Gretchena deludana, the arrowhead moth, is a species of tortricid moth in the family Tortricidae.
