= Coleophora rosaefoliella =

Scientific classification
- Kingdom: Animalia
- Phylum: Arthropoda
- Clade: Pancrustacea
- Class: Insecta
- Order: Lepidoptera
- Family: Coleophoridae
- Genus: Coleophora
- Species: C. rosaefoliella

Binomial name
- Coleophora rosaefoliella Clemens, 1864

Synonyms
- Coleophora ciliaeochrella Chambers, 1874

Species of moth

Coleophora rosaefoliella is a moth of the family Coleophoridae. It is found in North America, including Kentucky and Ontario.

The larvae feed on the leaves of Rosa species.
