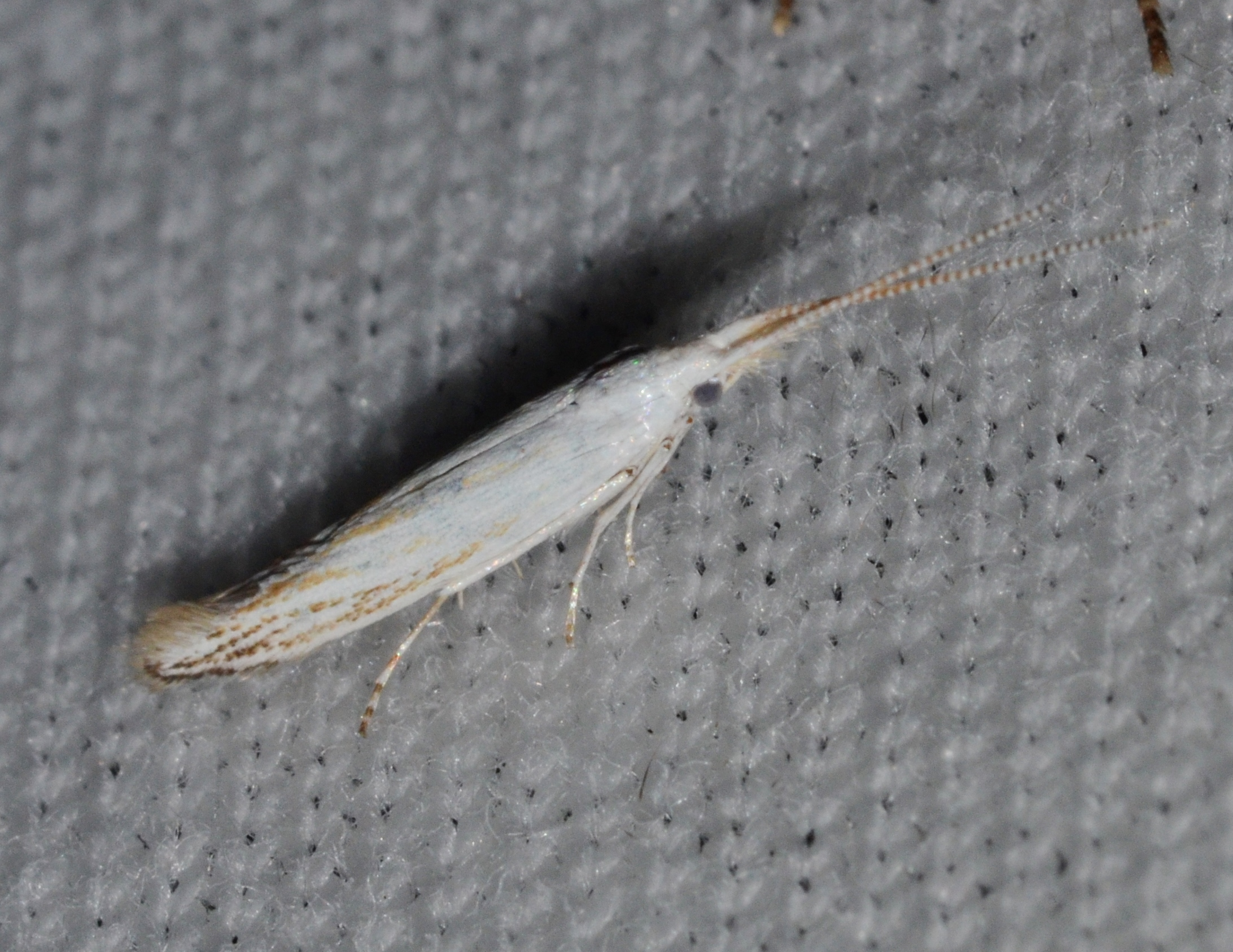

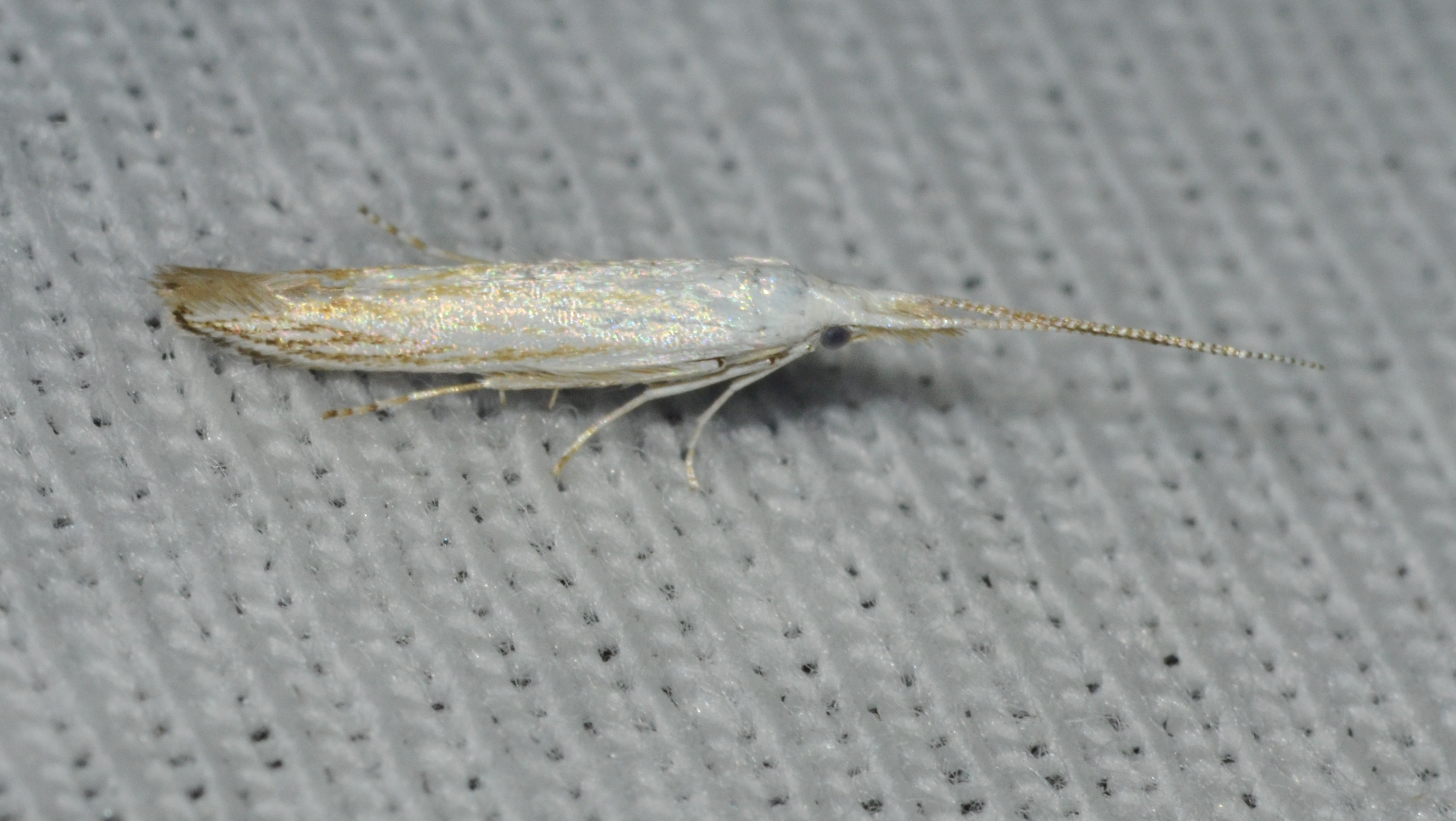

Scientific classification
- Kingdom: Animalia
- Phylum: Arthropoda
- Clade: Pancrustacea
- Class: Insecta
- Order: Lepidoptera
- Family: Coleophoridae
- Genus: Coleophora
- Species: C. tiliaefoliella

Binomial name
- Coleophora tiliaefoliella Clemens, 1861

= Coleophora tiliaefoliella =

Species of moth

Coleophora tiliaefoliella is a moth of the family Coleophoridae. It is found in North America, including Oklahoma, Pennsylvania and Ontario.

The larvae feed on the leaves of Tilia species. They create a pistol-shaped case.
