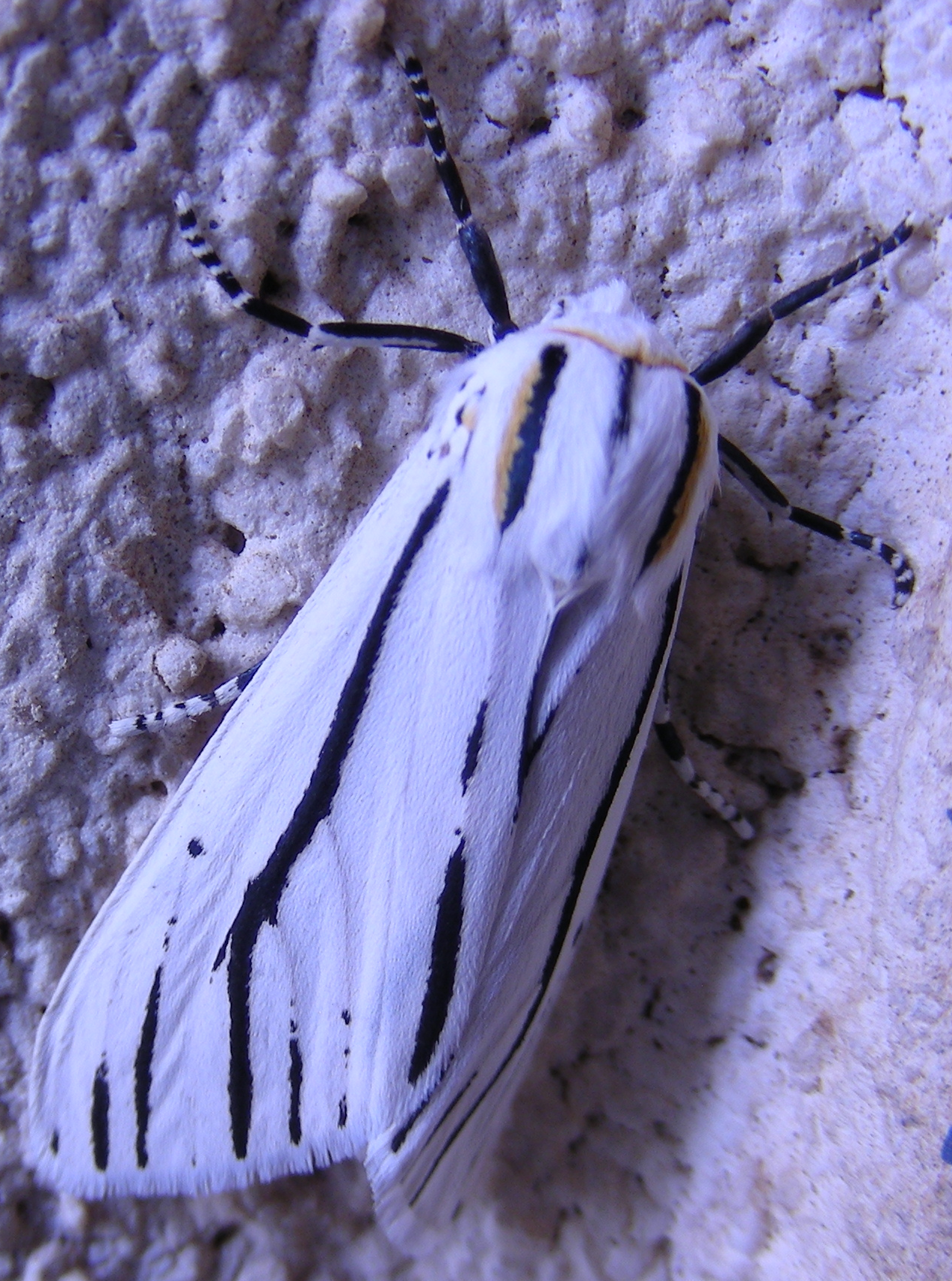
- Ectypia mexicana

Scientific classification
- Domain: Eukaryota
- Kingdom: Animalia
- Phylum: Arthropoda
- Class: Insecta
- Order: Lepidoptera
- Superfamily: Noctuoidea
- Family: Erebidae
- Subfamily: Arctiinae
- Subtribe: Phaegopterina
- Genus: Ectypia; Clemens, 1861

Synonyms
- Euverna Neumoegen & Dyar, 1893

= Ectypia =

Genus of moths

Ectypia is a genus of moths in the family Erebidae. The genus was erected by James Brackenridge Clemens in 1861.

== Species ==
- Ectypia bivittata Clemens, 1861
- Ectypia clio (Packard, 1864) – Clio tiger moth
- Ectypia mexicana (Dognin, 1911)
