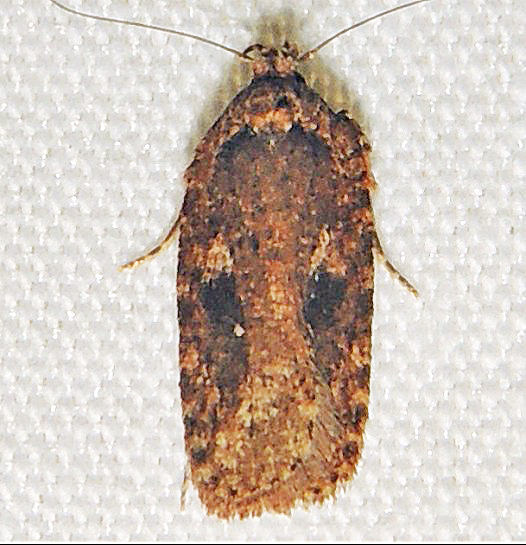

Scientific classification
- Kingdom: Animalia
- Phylum: Arthropoda
- Clade: Pancrustacea
- Class: Insecta
- Order: Lepidoptera
- Family: Depressariidae
- Genus: Agonopterix
- Species: A. pulvipennella

Binomial name
- Agonopterix pulvipennella (Clemens, 1864)

Synonyms
- Depressaria pulvipennella Clemens, 1864; Depressaia solidaginis Walsingham, 1889

= Agonopterix pulvipennella =

Species of moth

Agonopterix pulvipennella is a species of moth in the family Depressariidae. It is found in North America, where it has been recorded from Quebec and New Brunswick to North Carolina, west to Colorado and north to Saskatchewan.

The wingspan is 16–21 mm. Adults are on wing from February through October in one generation per year.

The larvae feed on the leaves of Solidago and Urtica species. The species overwinters as an adult.
