= Coleophora querciella =

Scientific classification
- Kingdom: Animalia
- Phylum: Arthropoda
- Clade: Pancrustacea
- Class: Insecta
- Order: Lepidoptera
- Family: Coleophoridae
- Genus: Coleophora
- Species: C. querciella

Binomial name
- Coleophora querciella Clemens, 1861

Species of moth

Coleophora querciella is a moth of the family Coleophoridae. It is found in North America, including Oklahoma, Pennsylvania and Canada.

The larvae feed on the leaves of Quercus, Tilia, Cornus, Prunus species.
