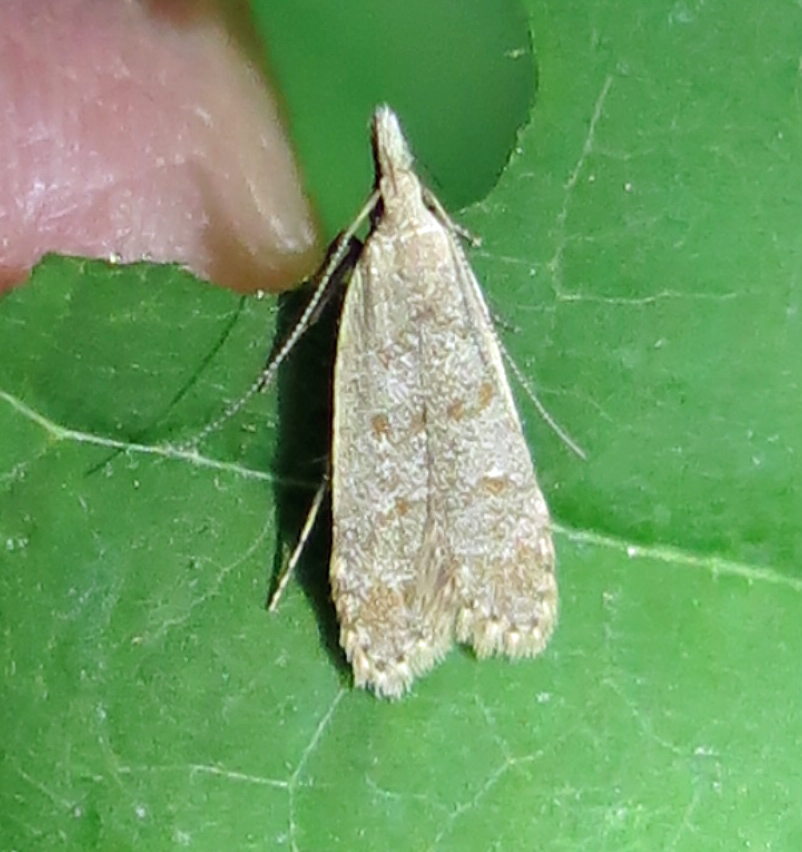

Scientific classification
- Kingdom: Animalia
- Phylum: Arthropoda
- Clade: Pancrustacea
- Class: Insecta
- Order: Lepidoptera
- Family: Gelechiidae
- Genus: Dichomeris
- Species: D. punctidiscellus

Binomial name
- Dichomeris punctidiscellus (Clemens, 1863)

Synonyms
- Ypsolopus punctidiscellus Clemens, 1863; Ypsolophus straminiella Chambers, 1872; Anarsia suffusella Chambers, 1874

= Dichomeris punctidiscellus =

Spotted dichomeris moth

Species of moth

Dichomeris punctidiscellus, the spotted dichomeris moth, is a moth in the family Gelechiidae. It was described by James Brackenridge Clemens in 1863. It is found in North America, where it has been recorded from southern Quebec, southern Ontario and Nebraska to Florida and south-eastern Texas.

The wingspan is about 18 mm. The forewings are pale ocherous, dusted and brown, along the costa towards the base paler, rather whitish. At the base of the fold is a brown dot, two of the same hue about the middle of the wing, and one or two, also brown, at about the end of the disc. Near the tip is an indistinct yellowish line, with a brown band exterior to it. The hindmargin has a series of blackish dots at the base of the cilia. The hindwings are somewhat plumbeous gray.
