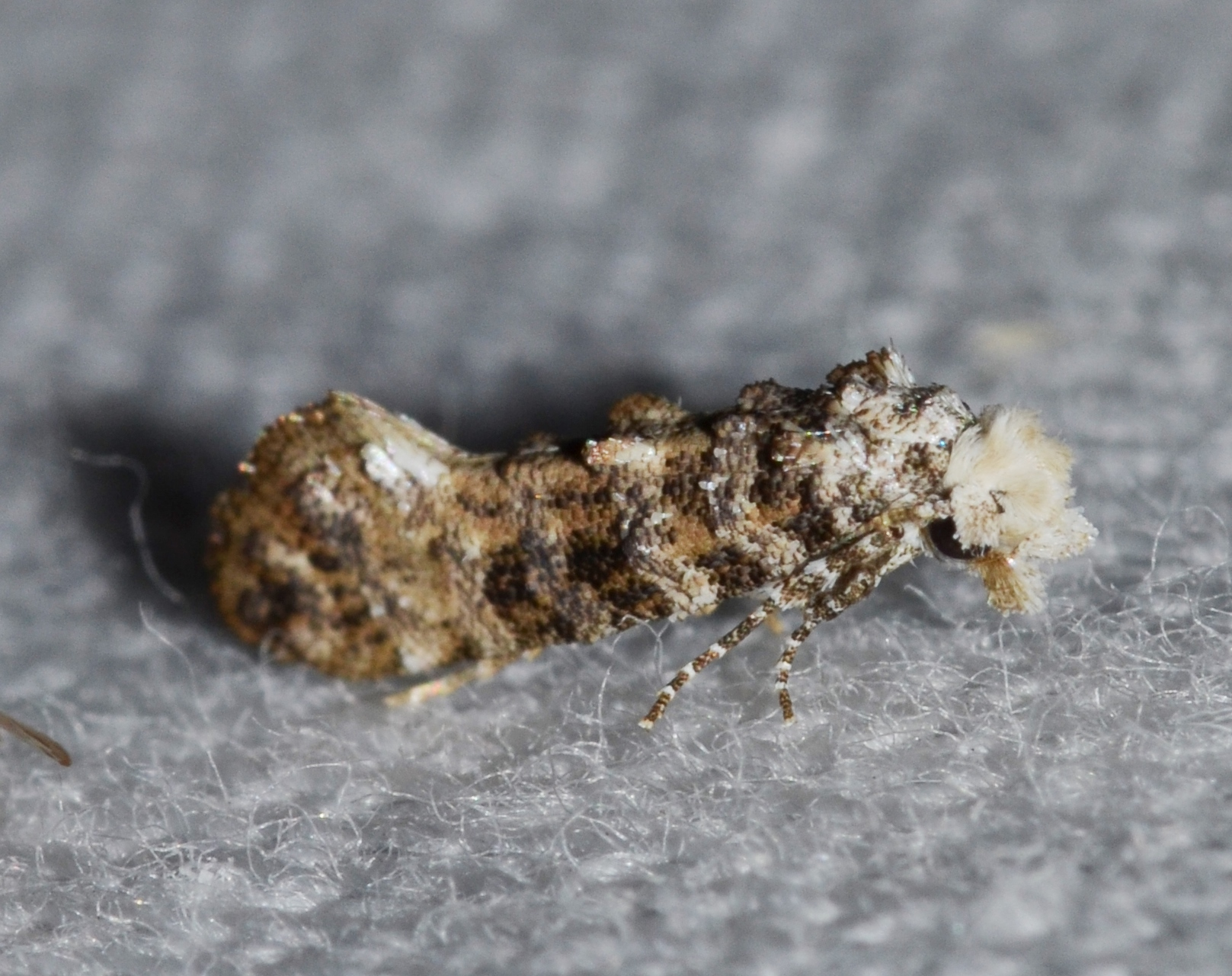

Scientific classification
- Kingdom: Animalia
- Phylum: Arthropoda
- Clade: Pancrustacea
- Class: Insecta
- Order: Lepidoptera
- Family: Tineidae
- Genus: Xylesthia
- Species: X. pruniramiella

Binomial name
- Xylesthia pruniramiella (Clemens, 1859)

Synonyms
- Xylesthia pruniramiella Clemens, 1859; Xylesthia clemensella Chambers, 1873; Xylesthia congeminatella Zeller, 1873; Xylesthia kearfottella Dietz, 1905

= Xylesthia pruniramiella =

Clemens' bark moth

Species of moth

Xylesthia pruniramiella, Clemens' bark moth, is a moth of the family Tineidae. It is found in North America, where it has been recorded from New Hampshire to Florida and from Illinois to Texas.

The wingspan is 12.7–13.7 mm. The forewings are blackish brown and luteous brown, somewhat varied with whitish, with patches of elevated scales at the base and along the fold and with an indistinct whitish band crossing the middle of the disc, one nearer the base still fainter and one about the end of the disc, with a white dorsal spot at the inner angle and a whitish streak from the costa above it, with another whitish costal streak between this and the tip. There is a blackish spot at the tip which is white margined before. The hindwings are dark brown, somewhat tinged with reddish. Adults are on wing from February to December.

The larvae feed on the woody excrescences found on the branches of the plum tree.
