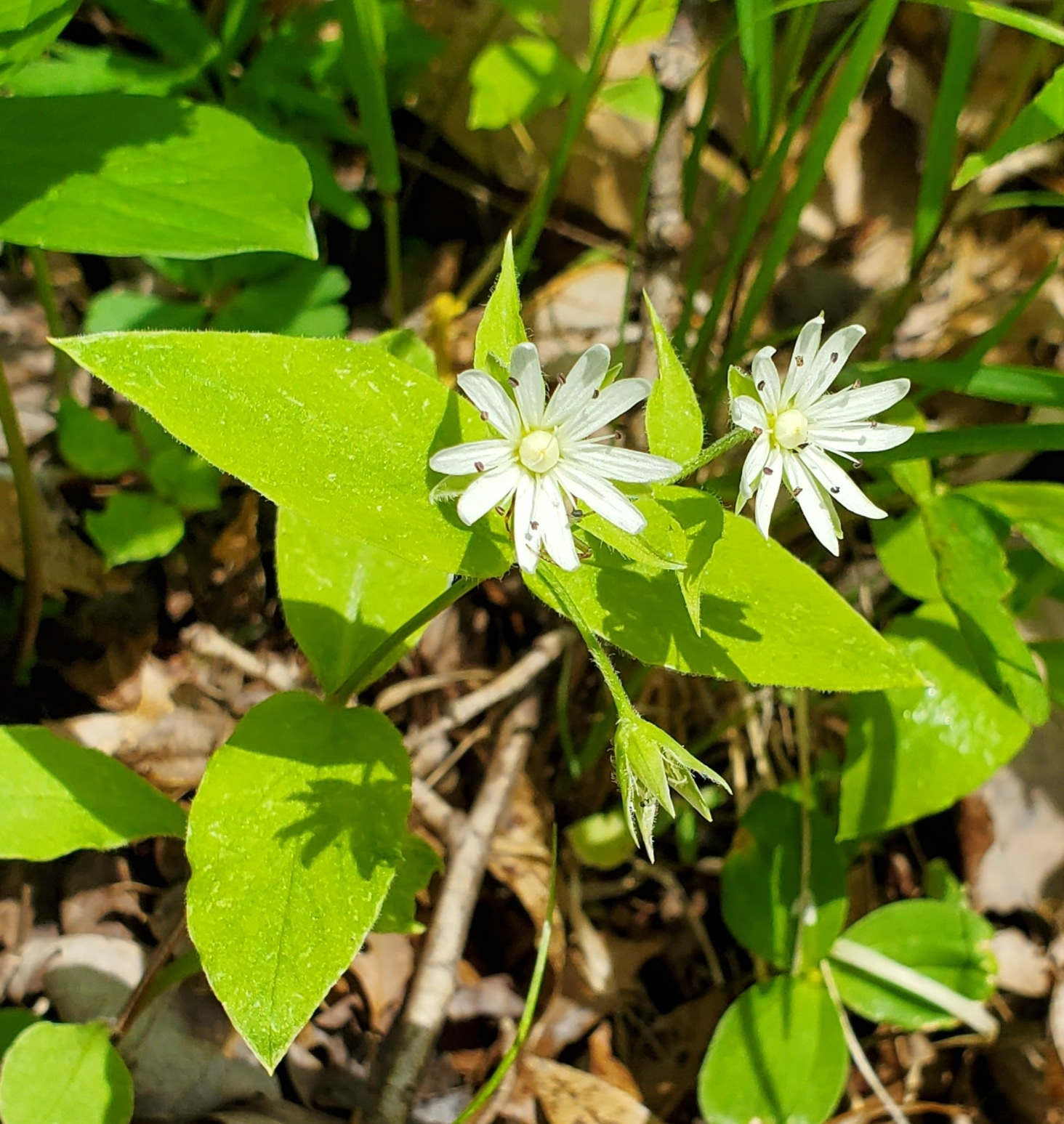

Scientific classification
- Kingdom: Plantae
- Clade: Tracheophytes
- Clade: Angiosperms
- Clade: Eudicots
- Order: Caryophyllales
- Family: Caryophyllaceae
- Genus: Stellaria
- Species: S. corei

Binomial name
- Stellaria corei Shinners

Synonyms
- Stellaria pubera subsp. silvatica Bég.; Stellaria pubera var. silvatica (Bég.) Weath.; Stellaria silvatica (Bég.); Alsine pubera var. tennesseensis C.Mohr; Alsine tennesseensis (C.Mohr); Stellaria tennesseensis (C.Mohr) Strausb. & Core

= Stellaria corei =

Species of flowering plant in the carnation family

Stellaria corei, commonly known as Tennessee chickweed, star chickweed, Tennessee starwort, and Tennessee stitchwort, is a species of flowering plant native to parts of the eastern United States.

== Description ==
Stellaria corei is similar to Stellaria pubera, with which it can be confused. It is a spring flowering perennial growing from spreading rhizomes. The square stems are upright, branched, and range from 10–40 cm (3.9–15.7 in) long. The Leaves near the base of the plant have stems but the leaves near the ends of the stems may be subsessile (lacking stems). The entire margined leaves are elliptic in shape, with broadly lanceolate to ovate ends, and 1–5 cm (0.39–1.97 in) × 5–16 mm (0.20–0.63 in) in size. The leaf bases are cuneate. The flowers are produced in 3 to 7 flowered Inflorescences that are terminal cymes. The white Flowers are 10–16 mm (0.39–0.63 in) in diameter, with five narrowly triangular sepals. The ripe fruits are straw colored to pale brown capsules. The mature seeds are brown and around 2 mm (0.079 in) in diameter. The diploid chromosome count is 60.

== Habitat and range ==
Stellaria corei grows in rocky woods, on bluffs, and in open woods. It is native to Alabama, Connecticut, Kentucky, Mississippi, North Carolina, Ohio, Pennsylvania, Tennessee, Virginia, West Virginia, and has been introduced to Idaho and New York.
