= Gretchena ochrantennae =

Scientific classification
- Domain: Eukaryota
- Kingdom: Animalia
- Phylum: Arthropoda
- Class: Insecta
- Order: Lepidoptera
- Family: Tortricidae
- Genus: Gretchena
- Species: G. ochrantennae

Binomial name
- Gretchena ochrantennae Razowski & Wojtusiak, 2006

Species of moth

Gretchena ochrantennae is a species of moth of the family Tortricidae. It is found in Morona-Santiago Province, Ecuador.

The wingspan is about 19 mm.
