= Ectypia clio =

Scientific classification
- Kingdom: Animalia
- Phylum: Arthropoda
- Clade: Pancrustacea
- Class: Insecta
- Order: Lepidoptera
- Superfamily: Noctuoidea
- Family: Erebidae
- Subfamily: Arctiinae
- Genus: Ectypia
- Species: E. clio

Binomial name
- Ectypia clio (Packard, 1864)

Synonyms
- Seirarctia clio Packard, 1864; Spilosoma thona Strecker, 1899; Euverna jessica Barnes, 1900

Species of moth

Ectypia clio, the Clio moth or Clio tiger moth, is a moth of the family Erebidae. It was described by Packard in 1864. It is found in California and from south-western to western Nebraska and Texas. It is also found in Arizona, Utah, New Mexico and Colorado. The habitat consists of lowland areas, where it is found along creeks and rivers and in agricultural and urban areas.

The length of the forewings is 15–20 mm. Adults are on wing from late spring to early August.

The larvae feed on Asclepias species. They are black and covered with hairs.

== Subspecies ==
- Ectypia clio clio
- Ectypia clio jessica (Barnes, 1900)
