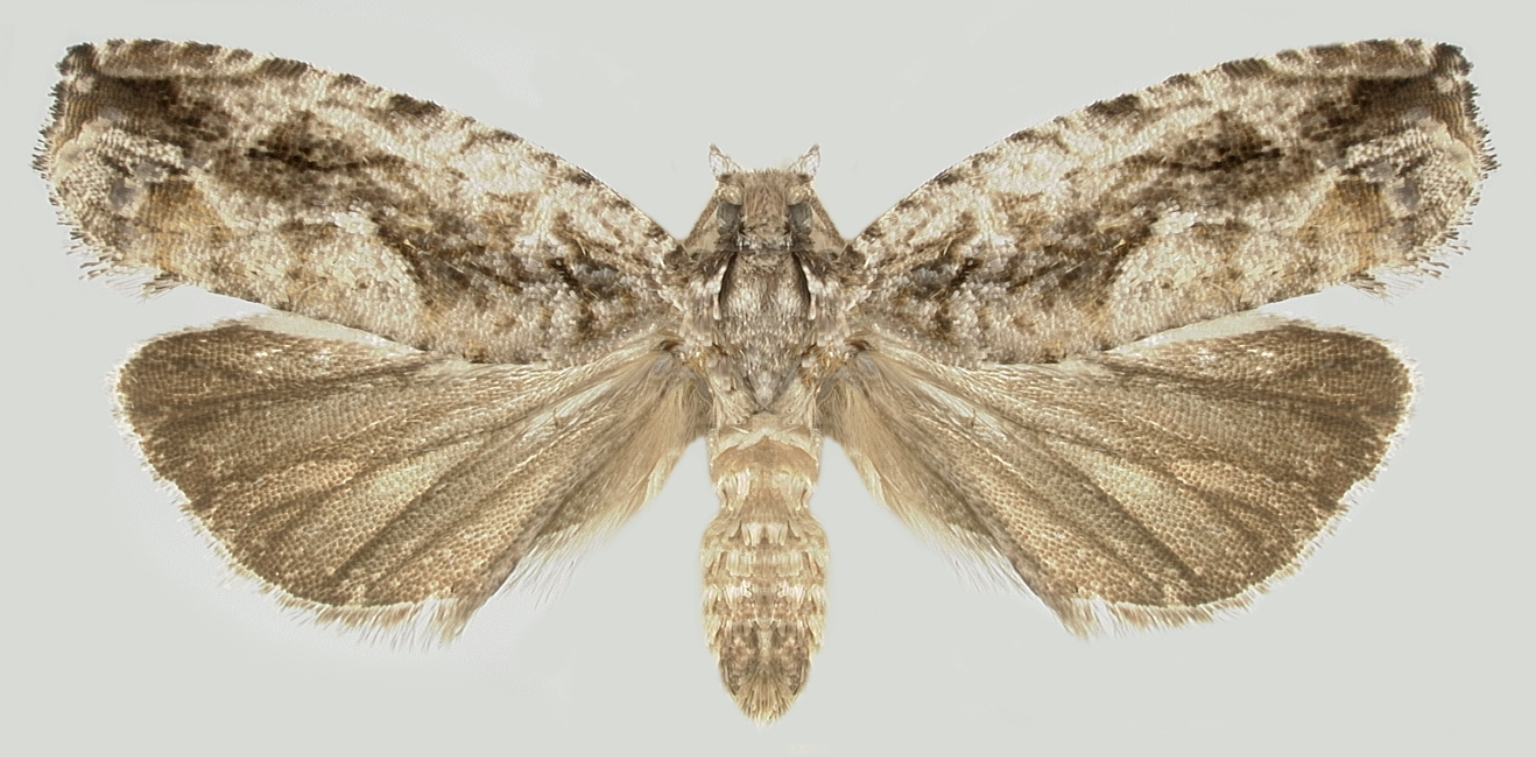
- Gretchena bolliana

Scientific classification
- Domain: Eukaryota
- Kingdom: Animalia
- Phylum: Arthropoda
- Class: Insecta
- Order: Lepidoptera
- Family: Tortricidae
- Tribe: Eucosmini
- Genus: Gretchena; Heinrich, 1923

= Gretchena =

Genus of tortrix moths

Gretchena is a genus of moths belonging to the subfamily Olethreutinae of the family Tortricidae.

== Species ==
- Gretchena amatana Heinrich, 1923
- Gretchena bolliana (Slingerland, 1896)
- Gretchena concitatricana (Heinrich, 1923)
- Gretchena concubitana Heinrich, 1923
- Gretchena delicatana Heinrich, 1923
- Gretchena deludana (Clemens, 1864)
- Gretchena dulciana Heinrich, 1923
- Gretchena garai Miller, 1987
- Gretchena nymphana Blanchard & Knudson, 1983
- Gretchena obsoletana Brown, 1982
- Gretchena ochrantennae Razowski & Wojtusiak, 2006
- Gretchena semialba McDunnough, 1925
- Gretchena watchungana (Kearfott, 1907)

== See also ==
- List of Tortricidae genera
