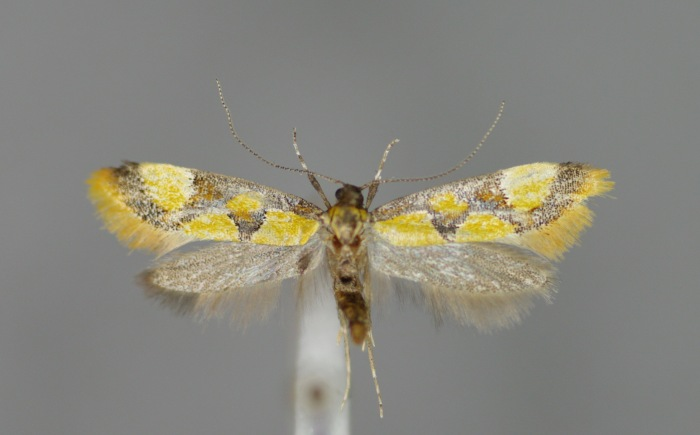
- Male
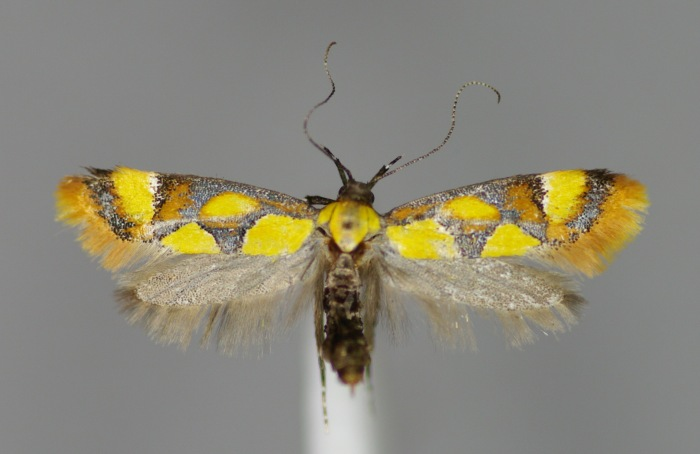
- Female

Scientific classification
- Kingdom: Animalia
- Phylum: Arthropoda
- Clade: Pancrustacea
- Class: Insecta
- Order: Lepidoptera
- Family: Oecophoridae
- Genus: Epicallima
- Species: E. icterinella

Binomial name
- Epicallima icterinella (Mann, 1867)

Synonyms
- Oecophora icterinella Mann, 1867; Fabiola icterinella

= Epicallima icterinella =

Species of moth

Epicallima icterinella is a moth of the family Oecophoridae. It is found in Croatia, Bulgaria, Serbia, Greece, as well as on Crete and Cyprus. Outside of Europe, it is found in Asia Minor and Syria.

The ground colour of the forewings is golden yellow with a violet wing margin and orange-yellow scales. The hindwings are dark grey.
