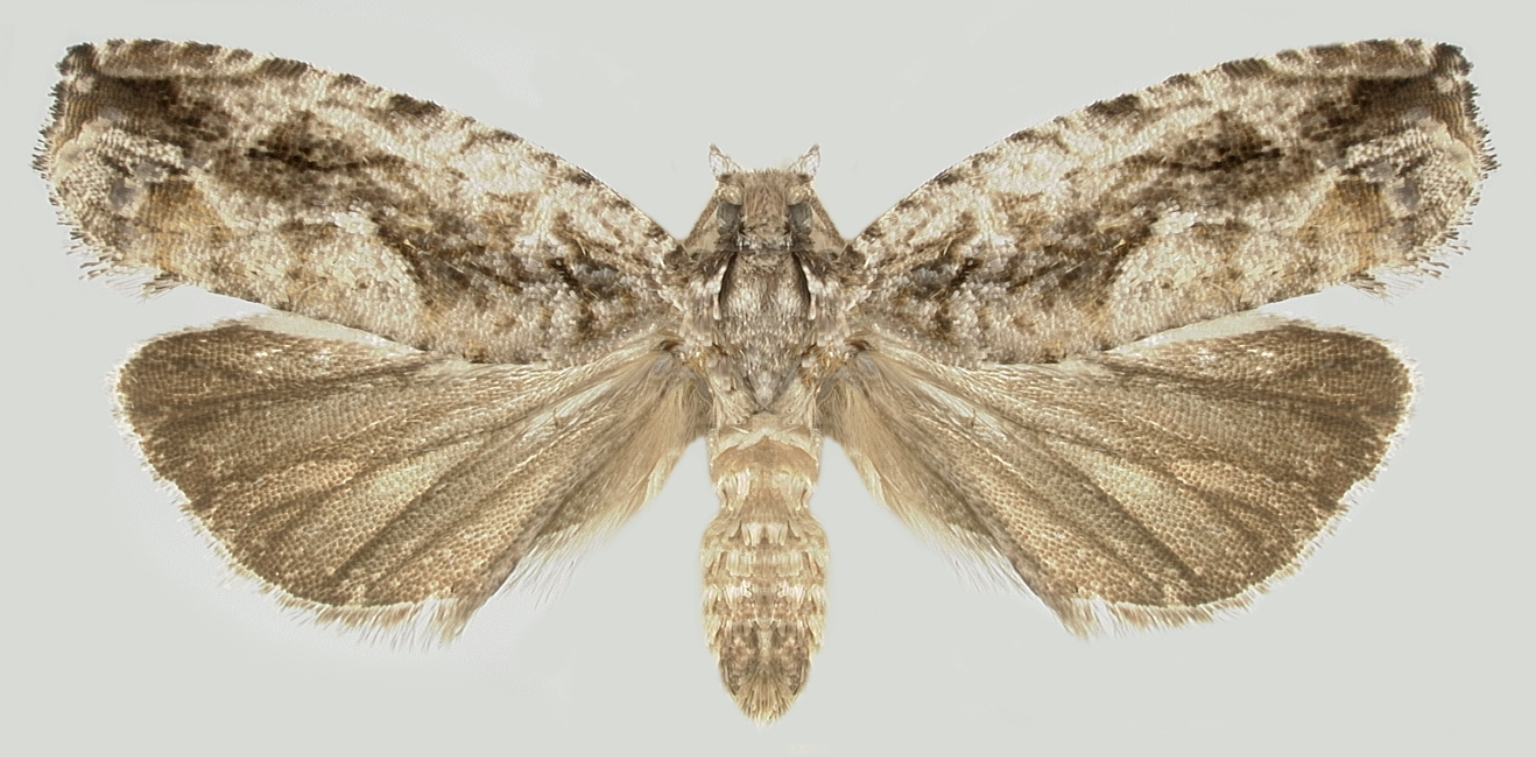

Scientific classification
- Domain: Eukaryota
- Kingdom: Animalia
- Phylum: Arthropoda
- Class: Insecta
- Order: Lepidoptera
- Family: Tortricidae
- Genus: Gretchena
- Species: G. bolliana

Binomial name
- Gretchena bolliana (Slingerland, 1896)

Synonyms
- Steganoptycha bolliana Slingerland, 1896

= Gretchena bolliana =

Species of moth

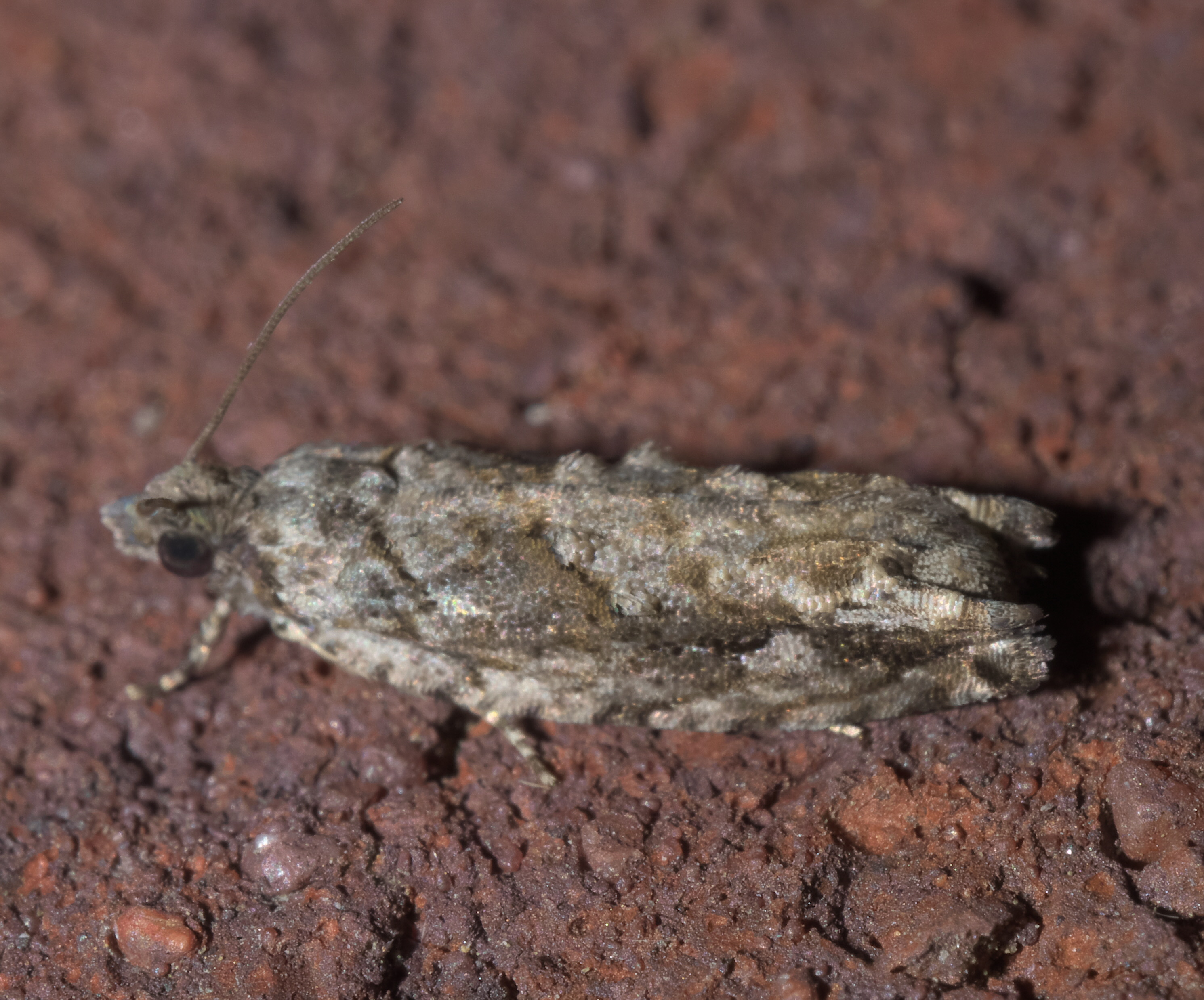
Gretchena bolliana, pecan bud moth, size: 8.6 mm

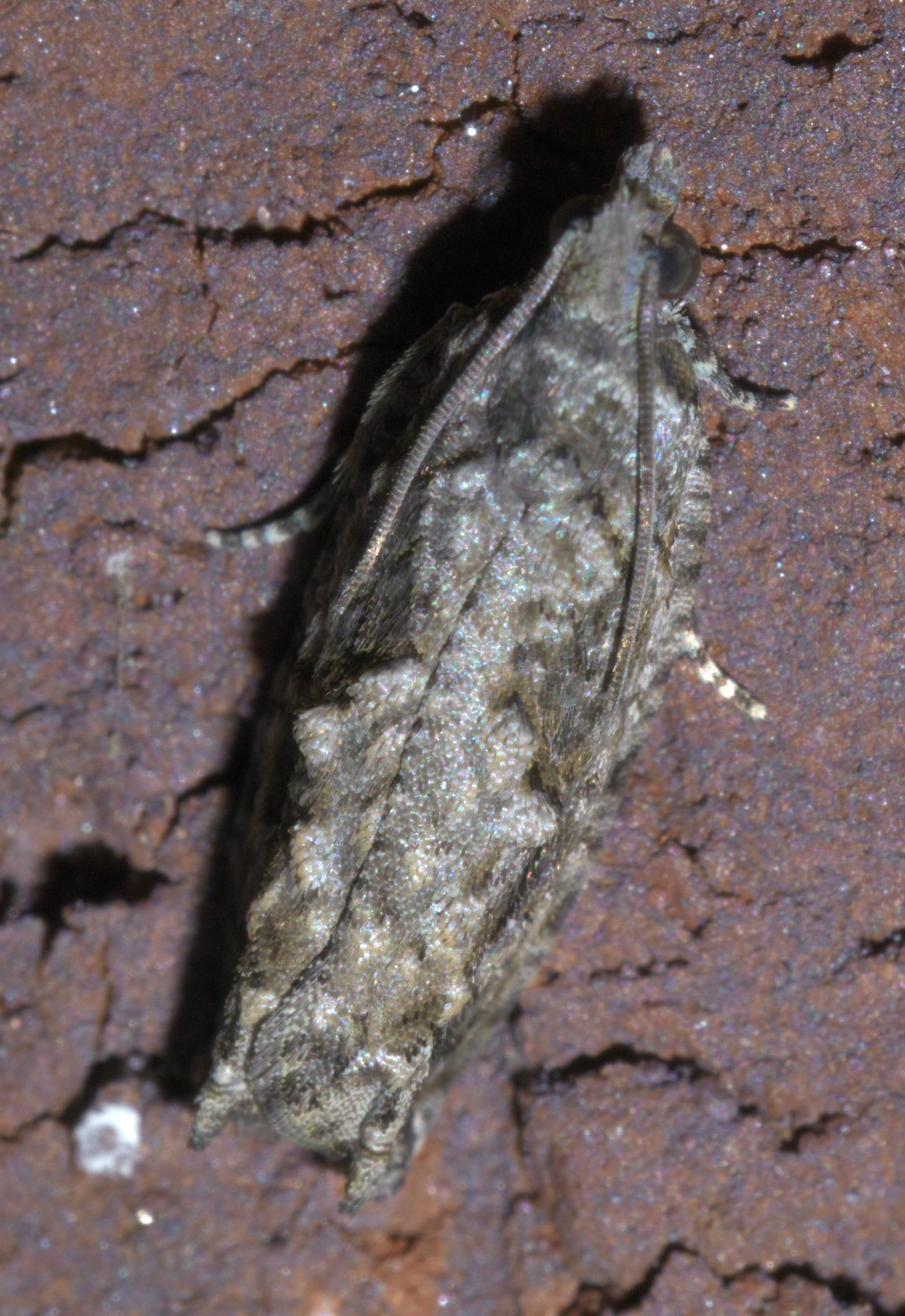
Gretchena bolliana, pecan bud moth, size: 9.2 mm

Gretchena bolliana, the pecan bud moth or gray-flanked gretchena moth, is a moth of the family Tortricidae. It is found in the United States from South Carolina to Florida and west to Texas, Arizona and New Mexico.

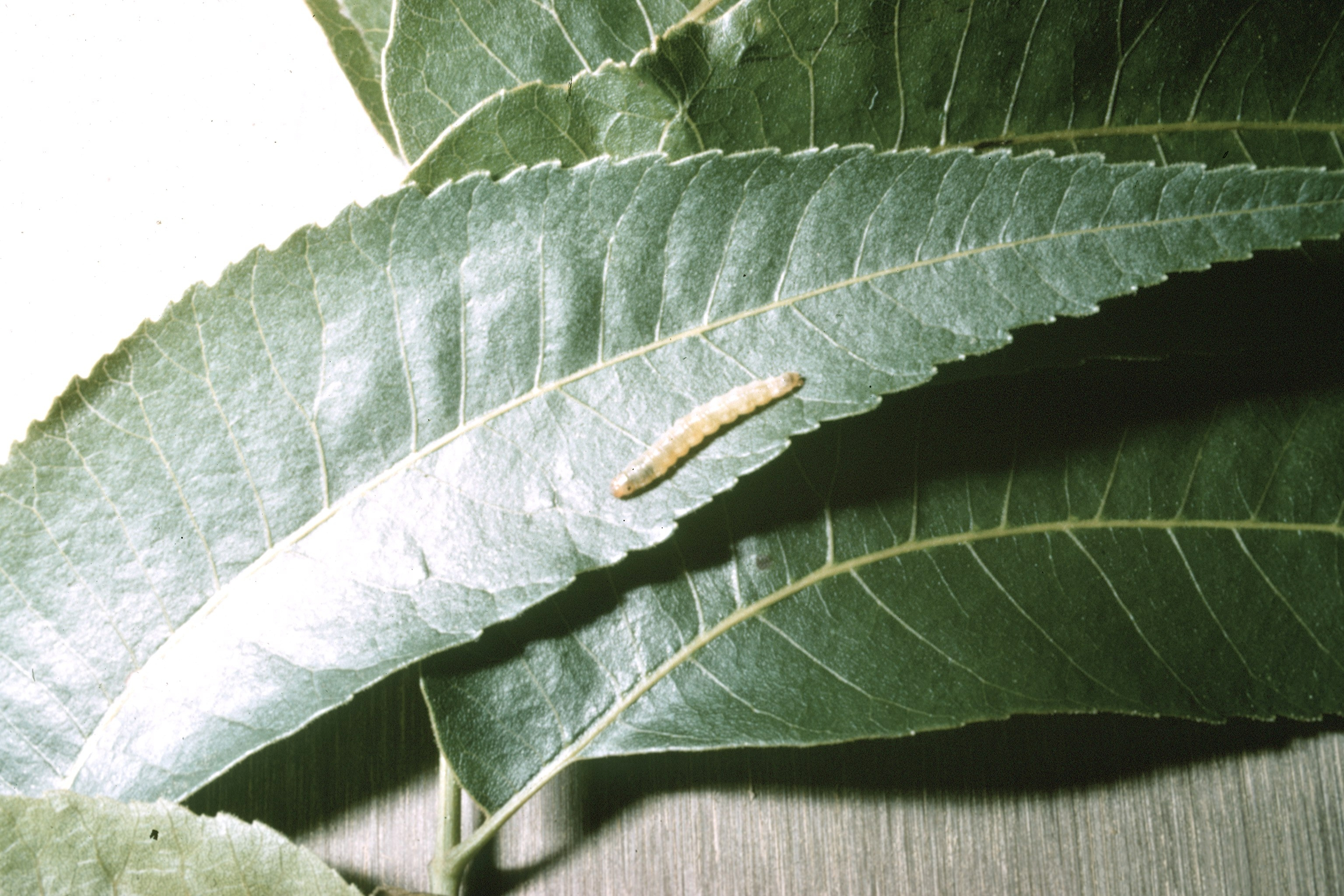
Damage

The wingspan is about 17 mm. There are probably five or six generations per year.

The larvae feed on the foliage of Carya illinoinensis.
