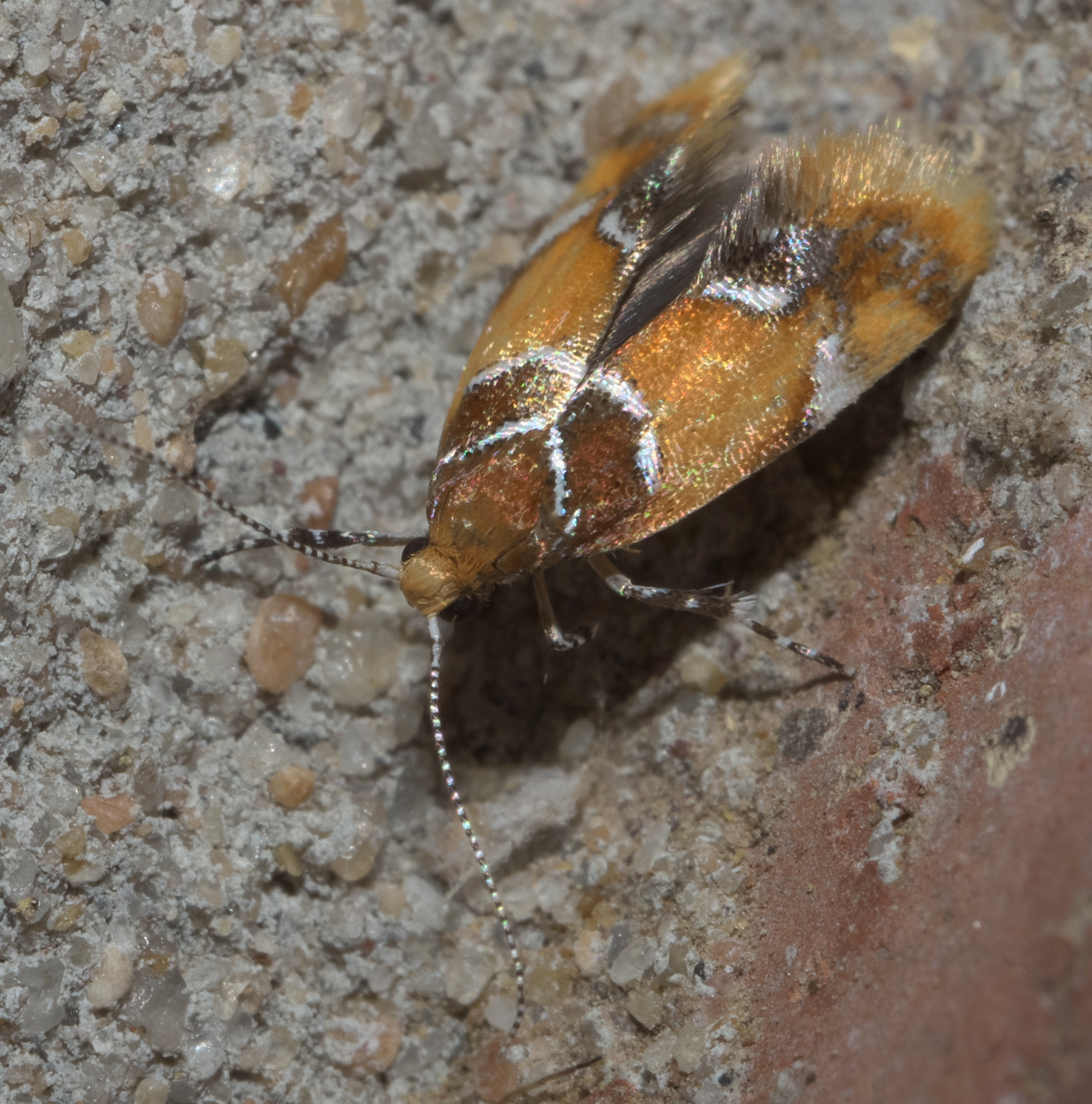
- Epicallima argenticinctella

Scientific classification
- Kingdom: Animalia
- Phylum: Arthropoda
- Class: Insecta
- Order: Lepidoptera
- Family: Oecophoridae
- Subfamily: Oecophorinae
- Tribe: Oecophorini
- Genus: Epicallima; Dyar, 1903

= Epicallima =

Genus of moths

Epicallima is a genus of concealer moths in the family Oecophoridae. The genus was erected by Harrison Gray Dyar Jr. in 1903. There are about seven described species in Epicallima, found primarily in North America and Europe.

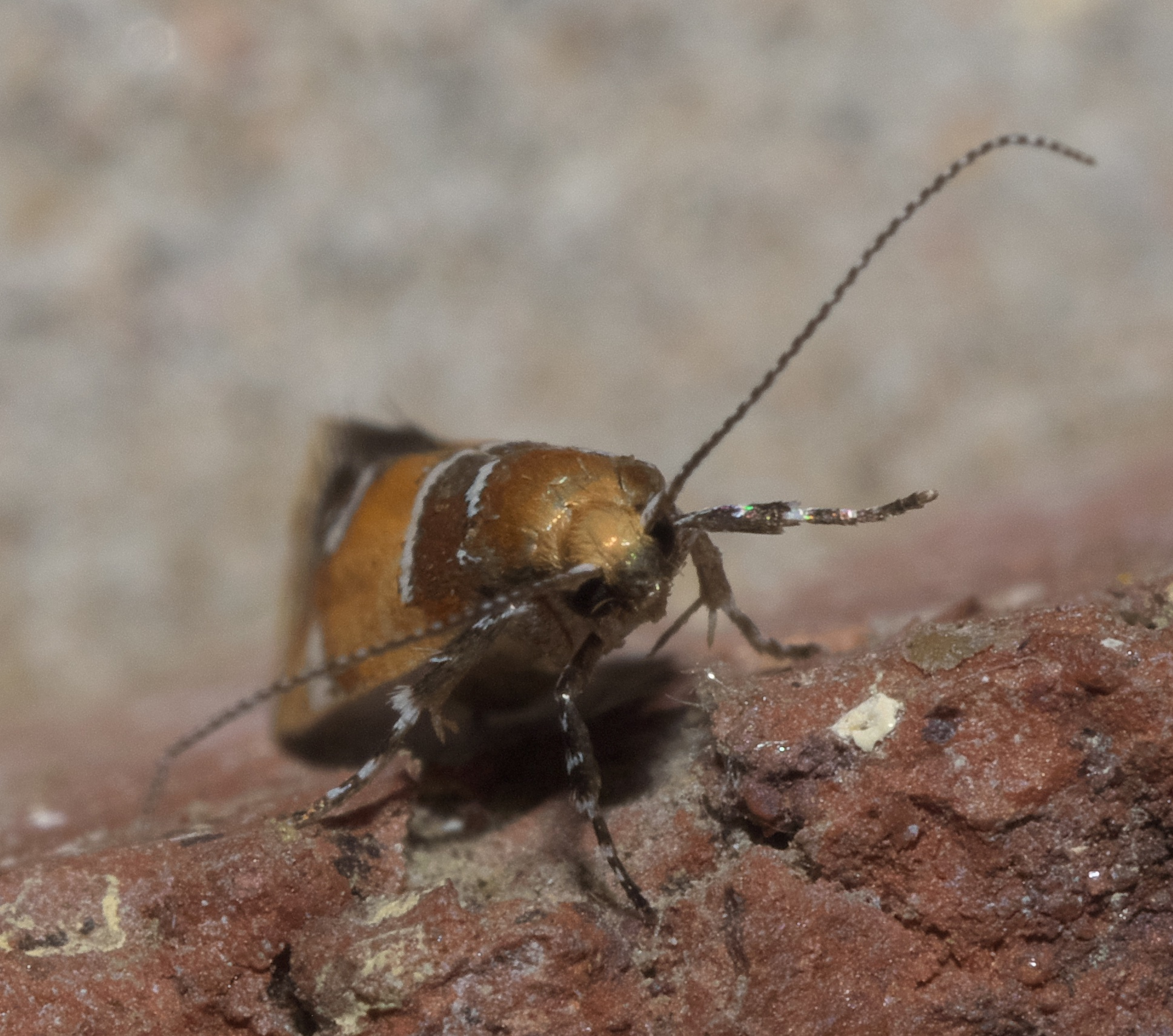
Epicallima argenticinctella

== Species ==
These seven species belong to the genus Epicallima:

- Epicallima argenticinctella (Clemens, 1860) (orange-headed epicallima)
- Epicallima bruandella (Ragonot, 1889)
- Epicallima formosella (Denis & Schiffermuller, 1775)
- Epicallima gerasimovi (Lvovsky, 1984)
- Epicallima icterinella (Mann, 1867)
- Epicallima mercedella (Staudinger, 1859)
- Epicallima mikkolai (Lvovsky, 1995)
