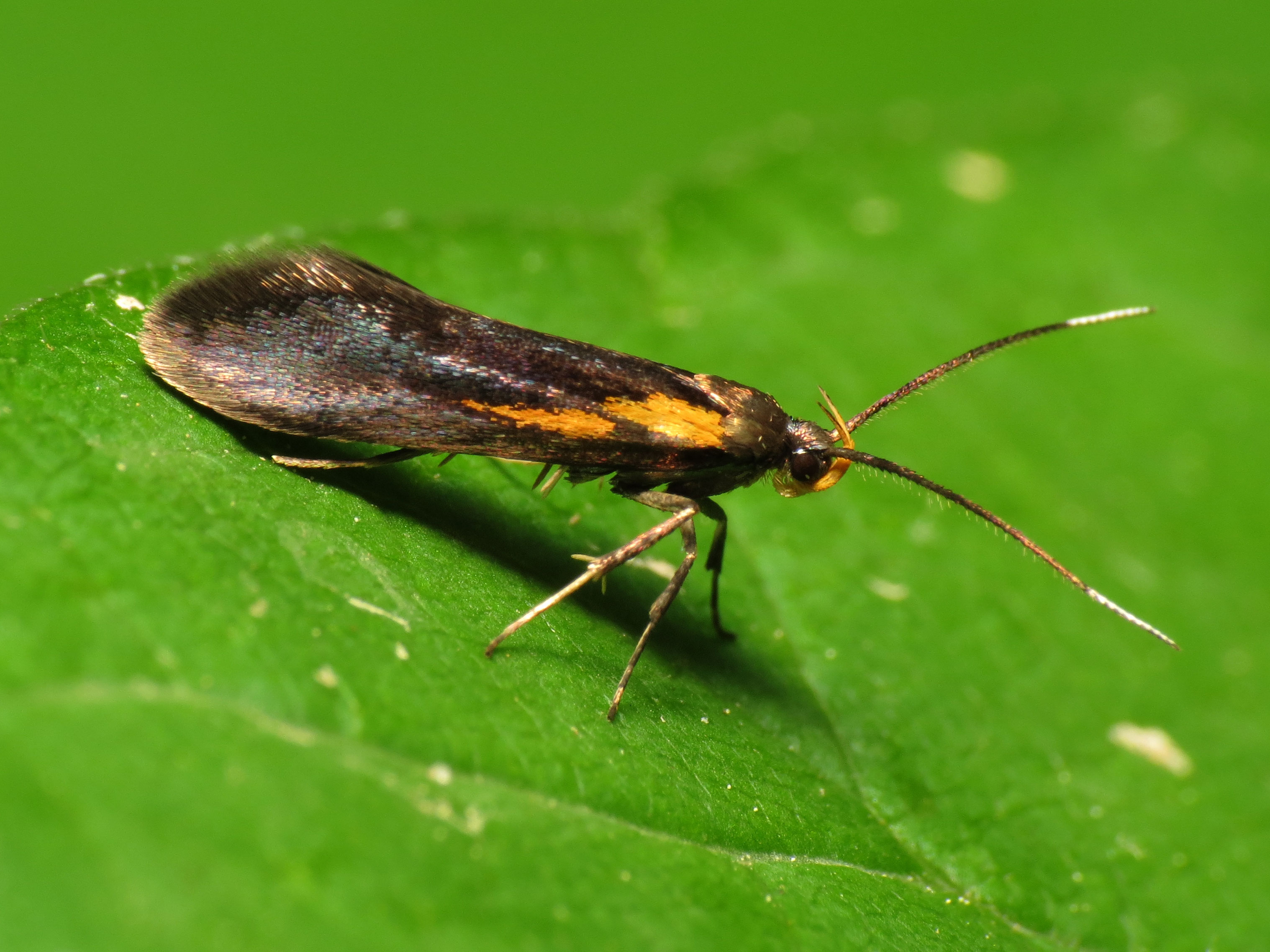
- Mathildana newmanella

Scientific classification
- Kingdom: Animalia
- Phylum: Arthropoda
- Class: Insecta
- Order: Lepidoptera
- Family: Oecophoridae
- Tribe: Oecophorini
- Genus: Mathildana; Clarke, 1941

= Mathildana =

Genus of moths

Mathildana is a genus of concealer moths in the family Oecophoridae. There are at least three described species in Mathildana.

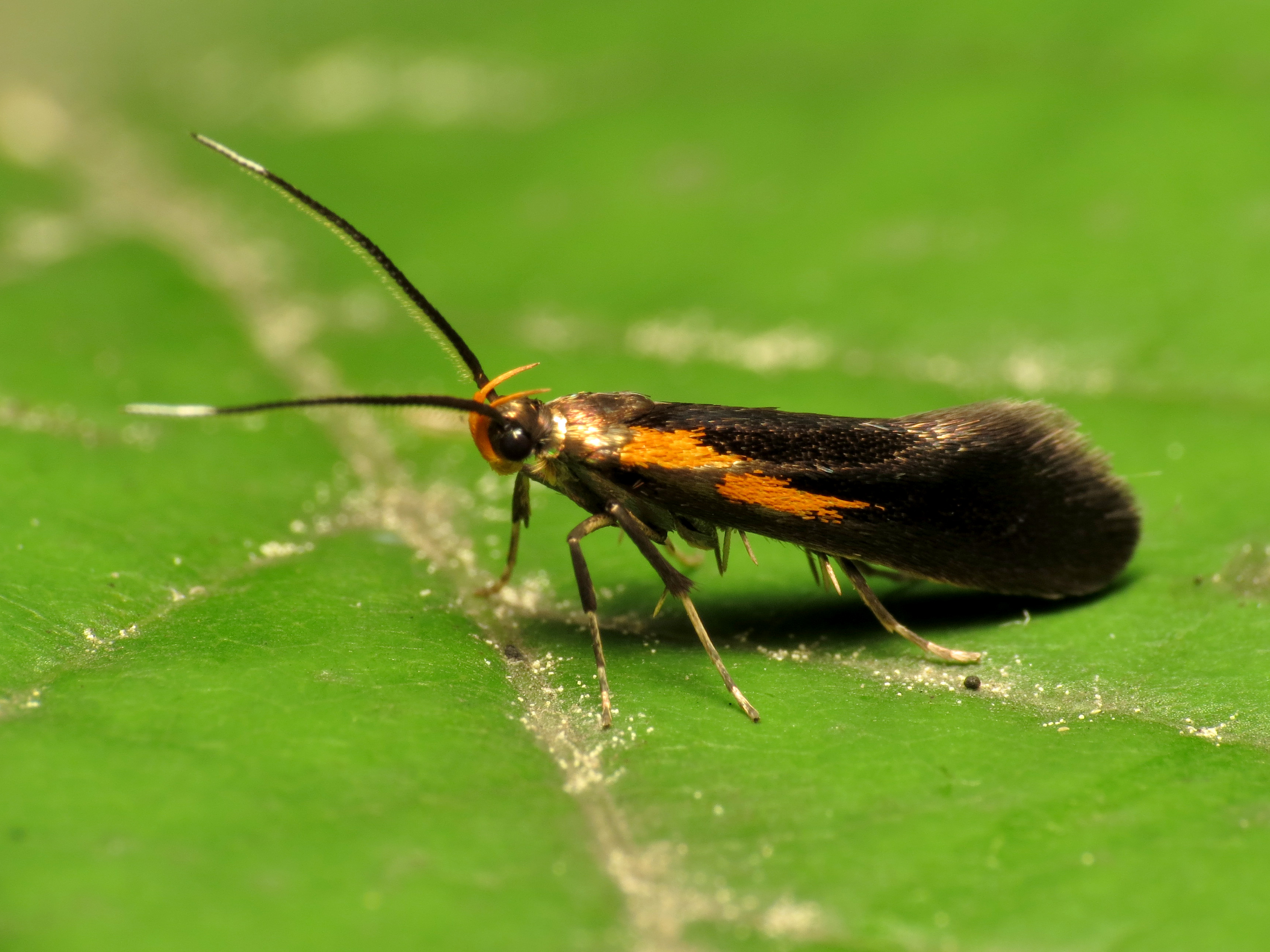
Mathildana newmanella

== Species ==
These three species belong to the genus Mathildana:

- Mathildana filpria Hodges, 1974^{c g}
- Mathildana flipria (Hodges, 1974)^{b}
- Mathildana newmanella Clemens, 1864^{c g b} (Newman's mathildana moth)

Data sources: i = ITIS, c = Catalogue of Life, g = GBIF, b = Bugguide.net
