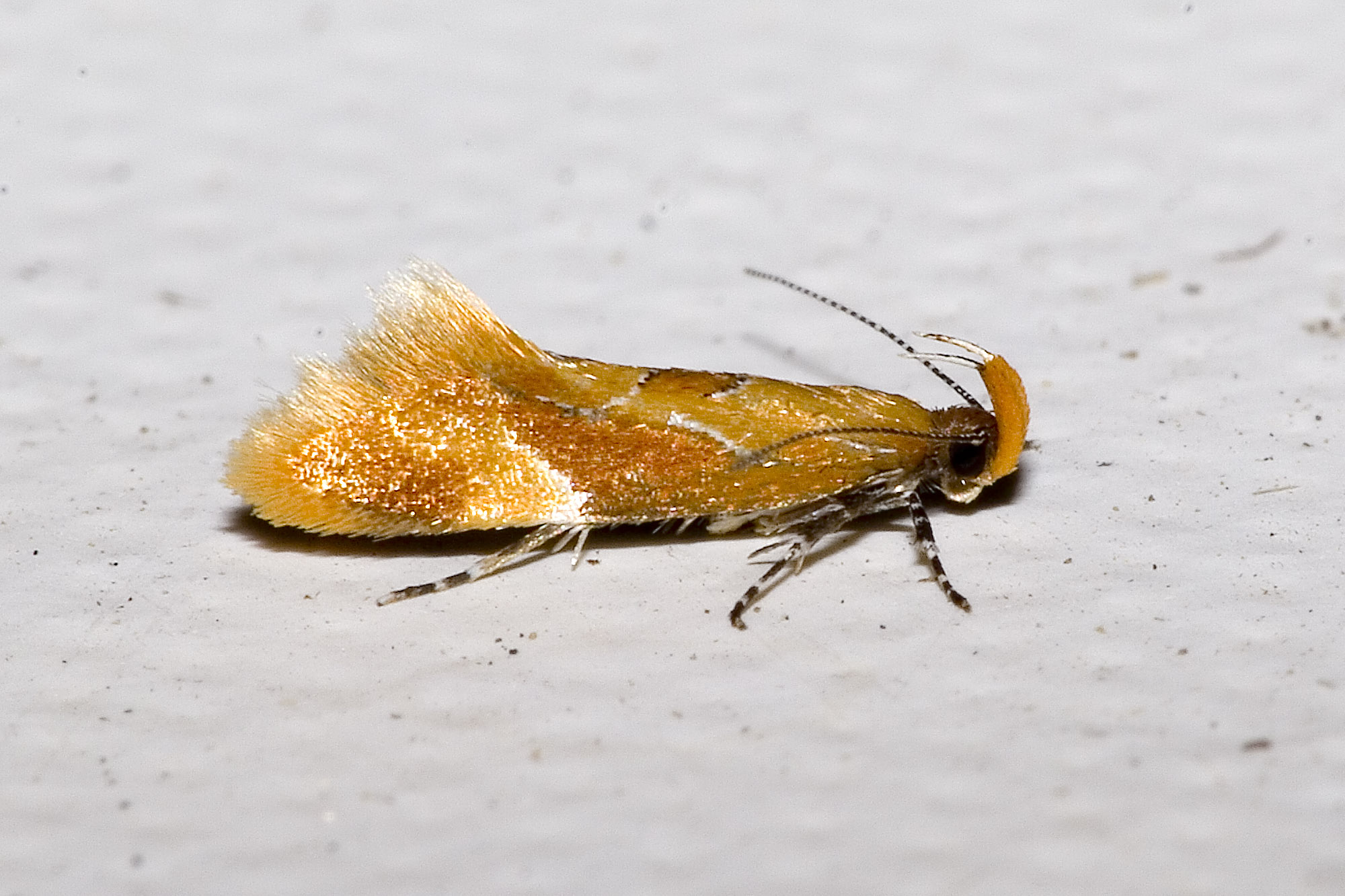
- Adult from Dresden (Germany)

Scientific classification
- Kingdom: Animalia
- Phylum: Arthropoda
- Clade: Pancrustacea
- Class: Insecta
- Order: Lepidoptera
- Family: Oecophoridae
- Genus: Epicallima
- Species: E. formosella

Binomial name
- Epicallima formosella (Denis & Schiffermüller, 1775)

Synonyms
- Borkhausenia formosella (Denis & Schiffermüller, 1775); Dafa formosella (Denis & Schiffermüller, 1775); Tinea formosella Denis & Schiffermüller, 1775

= Epicallima formosella =

Species of moth

Epicallima formosella is a species of gelechioid moth. It belongs to subfamily Oecophorinae of the concealer moth family (Oecophoridae). In modern schemes, it can be placed in the monotypic genus Dafa Hodges, 1974, as Dafa formosella (Denis & Schiffermüller, 1775).

It is found in Europe and introduced to North America The wingspan is 12–16 mm. Adults are on wing from June to August depending on the location.

The caterpillars feed on decaying wood, typically of poplars (Populus).
