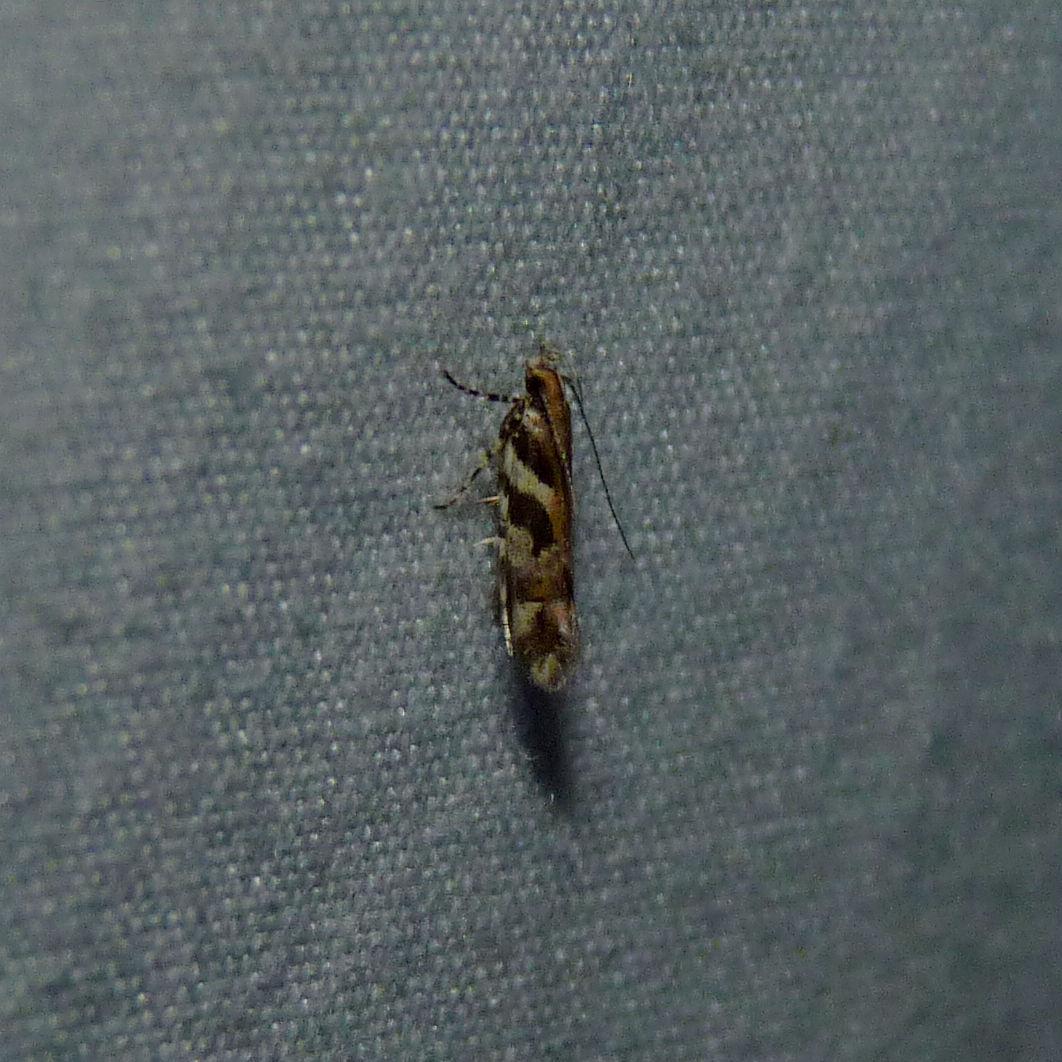

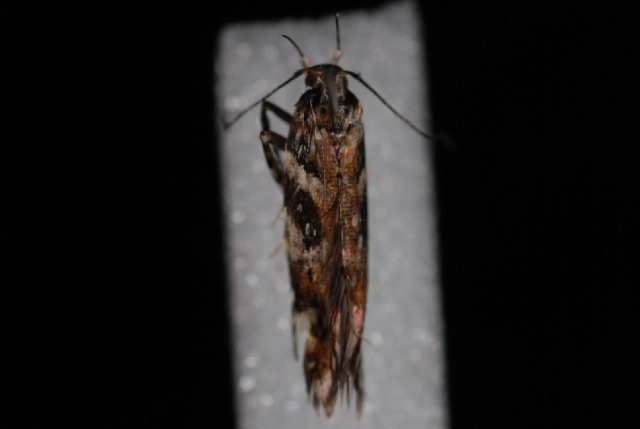

Scientific classification
- Kingdom: Animalia
- Phylum: Arthropoda
- Clade: Pancrustacea
- Class: Insecta
- Order: Lepidoptera
- Family: Gelechiidae
- Genus: Aristotelia
- Species: A. roseosuffusella

Binomial name
- Aristotelia roseosuffusella (Clemens, 1860)

Synonyms
- Gelechia roseosuffusella Clemens, 1860; Aristotelia bellela Walker, 1864

= Aristotelia roseosuffusella =

Species of moth

Aristotelia roseosuffusella, the pink-washed aristotelia, clover aristotelia moth or garden webworm, is a moth in the family Gelechiidae. It is found in North America, including Alabama, Georgia, Illinois, Kentucky, Maryland, Massachusetts, Michigan, New Jersey, Oklahoma, Ontario, South Carolina, Tennessee and Virginia. The species was first described by James Brackenridge Clemens in 1860.

The wingspan is about 11 mm. The forewings are dark brown, ocherous along the inner margin, where it is suffused with roseate. At the base of the wing is a white spot containing a dark brown dot, and near the base an oblique white band. About the middle of the wing is a large white spot or indistinct broad band, irrorated (speckled) with dark brownish and tinted with roseate on the inner margin. Near the tip is a costal white spot and a roseate spot opposite on the inner margin, and a whitish spot at the tip. The hindwings are dark fuscous-gray, cilia fuscous.
