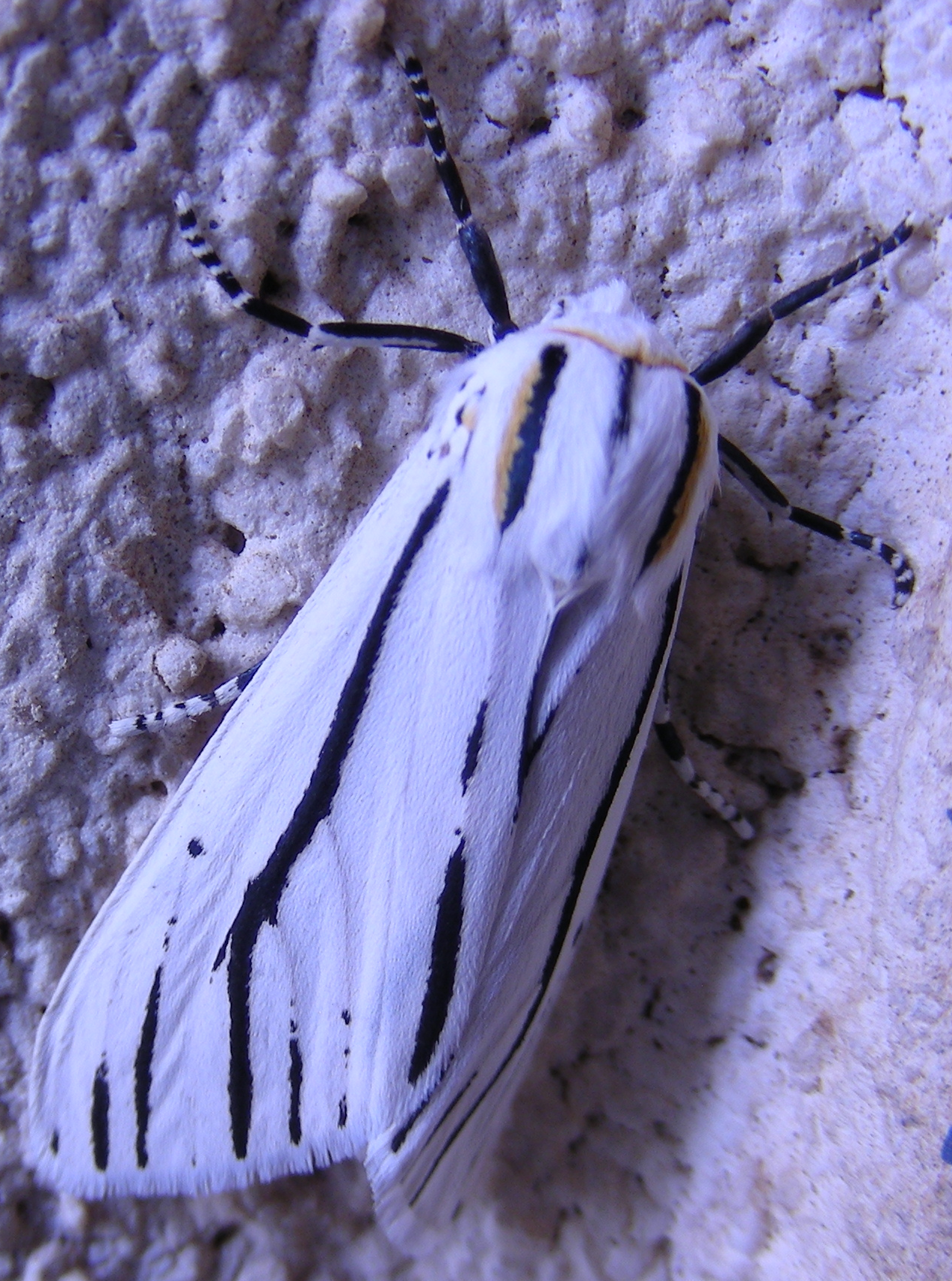

Scientific classification
- Domain: Eukaryota
- Kingdom: Animalia
- Phylum: Arthropoda
- Class: Insecta
- Order: Lepidoptera
- Superfamily: Noctuoidea
- Family: Erebidae
- Subfamily: Arctiinae
- Genus: Ectypia
- Species: E. mexicana

Binomial name
- Ectypia mexicana (Dognin, 1911)

Synonyms
- Euverna mexicana Dognin, 1911

= Ectypia mexicana =

Species of moth

Ectypia mexicana is a moth of the family Erebidae. It was described by Paul Dognin in 1911. It is found in Mexico and southern Texas.
