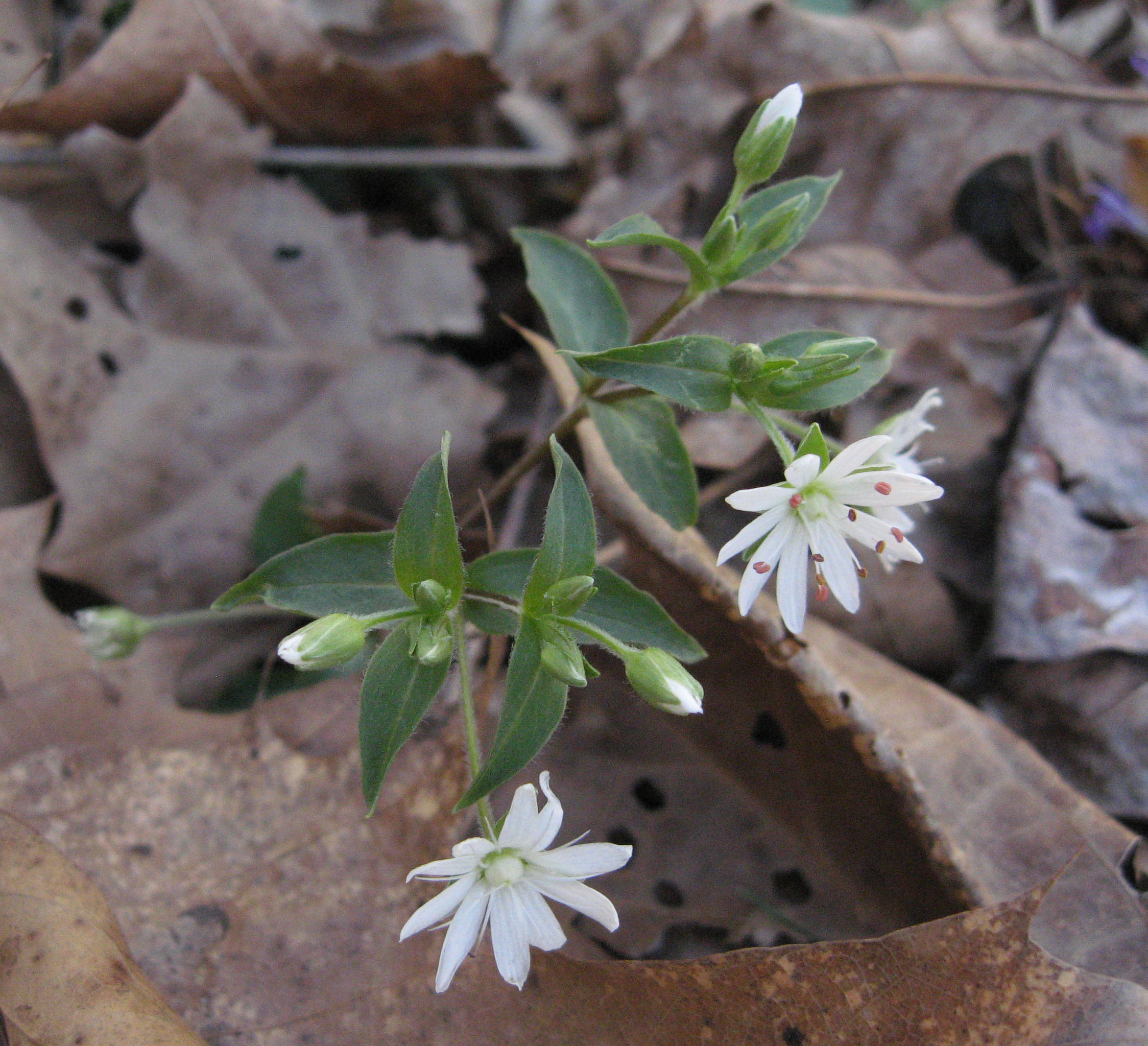

Conservation status
- Secure (NatureServe)

Scientific classification
- Kingdom: Plantae
- Clade: Tracheophytes
- Clade: Angiosperms
- Clade: Eudicots
- Order: Caryophyllales
- Family: Caryophyllaceae
- Genus: Stellaria
- Species: S. pubera

Binomial name
- Stellaria pubera Michx.

= Stellaria pubera =

Star chickweed

Species of flowering plant in the carnation family

Stellaria pubera, commonly called the star chickweed, is a spring-flowering plant in the carnation family Caryophyllaceae, native to the eastern United States.

== Habitat and range ==
Stellaria pubera is widespread and common. Its natural habitat is bottomland forests and mesic forests, where it is often found on rocky slopes. It is found chiefly from Pennsylvania south to Georgia and west to Indiana and Alabama, with scattered populations in New York, New England, Illinois, Nebraska, Mississippi and Louisiana.

== Description ==
An early spring bloomer, star chickweed may be seen in flower as early as late March.

It grows 6 inches (15 cm) to 12 inches (30 cm) high. The leaves are ovate, growing opposite one another and usually attached without stalks to the weak and sometimes reclining stem. Close examination of the flower reveals that what appears to be ten petals are actually five, each deeply cleft. The blossom as a result looks star-like, with its white, pointed petal segments surrounding an off-white center. Stamens are tipped with dark anthers. The stem has rows of small soft hairs that switch sides at each node.

It is similar to Stellaria corei, with which it can easily be confused.

== Etymology ==
The star-shaped flowers of star chickweed inspired the common and Latin name for this flower. The genus name, Stellaria, comes from the Latin stella, meaning "star". The species name, pubera ("hairy"), comes from the lines of hairs that line the stem.

== Conservation ==
Star chickweed is endangered in the state of New Jersey.
