= James Brackenridge Clemens =

American lepidopterist (1825–1867)

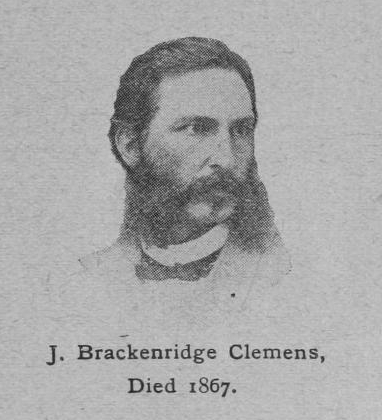

James Brackenridge Clemens (31 January 1825, in Wheeling, Virginia – 11 January 1867, in Easton, Pennsylvania) was an American entomologist who specialized in Lepidoptera. He described many new species. His collection of microlepidoptera is in the Academy of Natural Sciences of Philadelphia.

== Works ==
- 1859 "Synopsis of the North American Sphingides" Journal of the Academy of Natural Sciences Philadelphia 4 (2): 97-190
- 1859-1861 "Contributions to American Lepidopterology 1-7" Proceedings of the Entomological Society of Philadelphia
- 1863 "American Micro-Lepidoptera" Proceedings of the Entomological Society of Philadelphia 2(1):4–14.
- 1864 "North American Microlepidoptera" Proceedings of the Entomological Society of Philadelphia 2: 415–430.
- 1872 The Tineina of North America. Ed. H.T. Stainton. London, J. Van Voorst, 1872.
