= Cameraria jacintoensis =

Scientific classification
- Kingdom: Animalia
- Phylum: Arthropoda
- Class: Insecta
- Order: Lepidoptera
- Family: Gracillariidae
- Genus: Cameraria
- Species: C. jacintoensis

Binomial name
- Cameraria jacintoensis Opler & Davis, 1981

Species of moth

Cameraria jacintoensis is a moth of the family Gracillariidae. It is known from California, United States.

The length of the forewings is 2.8–4.5 mm.

The larvae feed on Quercus kelloggii, Quercus dumosa, Quercus dumosa var. turbinella, Quercus dumosa × turbinella californica and Quercus turbinella. They mine the leaves of their host plant.
