= Phyllonorycter loxozona =

Scientific classification
- Kingdom: Animalia
- Phylum: Arthropoda
- Class: Insecta
- Order: Lepidoptera
- Family: Gracillariidae
- Genus: Phyllonorycter
- Species: P. loxozona

Binomial name
- Phyllonorycter loxozona (Meyrick, 1936)

Synonyms
- Lithocolletis loxozona Meyrick, 1936

Species of moth

Phyllonorycter loxozona is a moth of the family Gracillariidae. It is known from South Africa and Uganda. The record for Kenya is a misidentification of Cameraria torridella.

The length of the forewings is 2.8–3.2 mm. Adults are on wing from early February to mid-May and from early October to mid-December.

The larvae feed on Dombeya bagshawei, Dombeya emarginata and Dombeya rotundifolia. They mine the leaves of their host plant.
