= Cameraria tildeni =

Scientific classification
- Kingdom: Animalia
- Phylum: Arthropoda
- Class: Insecta
- Order: Lepidoptera
- Family: Gracillariidae
- Genus: Cameraria
- Species: C. tildeni

Binomial name
- Cameraria tildeni Opler & Davis, 1981

Species of moth

Cameraria tildeni is a moth of the family Gracillariidae. It is known from California, United States.

The length of the forewings is 3.8-4.2 mm.

The larvae feed on Chrysolepis chrysophylla.
