= Cameraria marinensis =

Scientific classification
- Kingdom: Animalia
- Phylum: Arthropoda
- Class: Insecta
- Order: Lepidoptera
- Family: Gracillariidae
- Genus: Cameraria
- Species: C. marinensis

Binomial name
- Cameraria marinensis Opler & Davis, 1981

Species of moth

Cameraria marinensis is a moth of the family Gracillariidae. It is known from California, United States.

The length of the forewings is 4.5–5.5 mm.

The larvae feed on Lithocarpus densiflorus. They mine the leaves of their host plant.
