= Cameraria saliciphaga =

Scientific classification
- Domain: Eukaryota
- Kingdom: Animalia
- Phylum: Arthropoda
- Class: Insecta
- Order: Lepidoptera
- Family: Gracillariidae
- Genus: Cameraria
- Species: C. saliciphaga

Binomial name
- Cameraria saliciphaga (Kuznetzov, 1975)

Species of moth

Cameraria saliciphaga is a moth of the family Gracillariidae. It is known from Tajikistan, Turkmenistan and Uzbekistan.

The larvae feed on Salix species (including Salix australior, Salix excelsa and Salix triandra). They mine the leaves of their host plant.
