= Cameraria sadlerianella =

Scientific classification
- Kingdom: Animalia
- Phylum: Arthropoda
- Class: Insecta
- Order: Lepidoptera
- Family: Gracillariidae
- Genus: Cameraria
- Species: C. sadlerianella

Binomial name
- Cameraria sadlerianella Opler & Davis, 1981

Species of moth

Cameraria sadlerianella is a moth of the family Gracillariidae. It is known from California and Oregon in the United States.

The length of the forewings is 4.3-4.9 mm.

The larvae feed on Quercus sadleriana. They mine the leaves of their host plant. The mine is found on the upperside of the leaf. It is ovoid to triangular. The epidermis is opaque with a yellow tan. The mine is usually located on one side of the midrib with one mine edge oriented adjacent to the midrib. The species is solitary with usually one mine per leaf. Normally, there is one longitudinal fold.

== Etymology ==
The name of the new species is derived from the specific name of its host, Quercus sadleriana.
