= Cameraria serpentinensis =

Scientific classification
- Kingdom: Animalia
- Phylum: Arthropoda
- Class: Insecta
- Order: Lepidoptera
- Family: Gracillariidae
- Genus: Cameraria
- Species: C. serpentinensis

Binomial name
- Cameraria serpentinensis Opler & Davis, 1981

Species of moth

Cameraria serpentinensis is a moth of the family Gracillariidae. It is known from California, United States.

The length of the forewings is 3.2-4.2 mm.

The larvae feed on Quercus douglasii, Quercus dumosa, Quercus durata and Quercus × alvordiana. They mine the leaves of their host plant. The mine is ovoid. The epidermis is opaque, brown. All mines cross the midrib and consume 60%-90% of the leaf surface. The mines are solitary and normally with two folds, but rarely one. These folds are not necessarily parallel to each other. The leaf is bowed up with a sunken area at the middle of leaf.

== Etymology ==
The specific name is derived from the type of soil (i.e., serpentine) on which one of its host occurs.
