= Cameraria anomala =

Scientific classification
- Kingdom: Animalia
- Phylum: Arthropoda
- Clade: Pancrustacea
- Class: Insecta
- Order: Lepidoptera
- Family: Gracillariidae
- Genus: Cameraria
- Species: C. anomala

Binomial name
- Cameraria anomala Opler & Davis, 1981

Species of moth

Cameraria anomala is a moth of the family Gracillariidae. It is known from California, United States.

The length of the forewings is 3–4.8 millimetres (0.12–0.19 in).

The larvae feed on Quercus agrifolia and Quercus wislizeni. They mine the leaves of their host plant.
