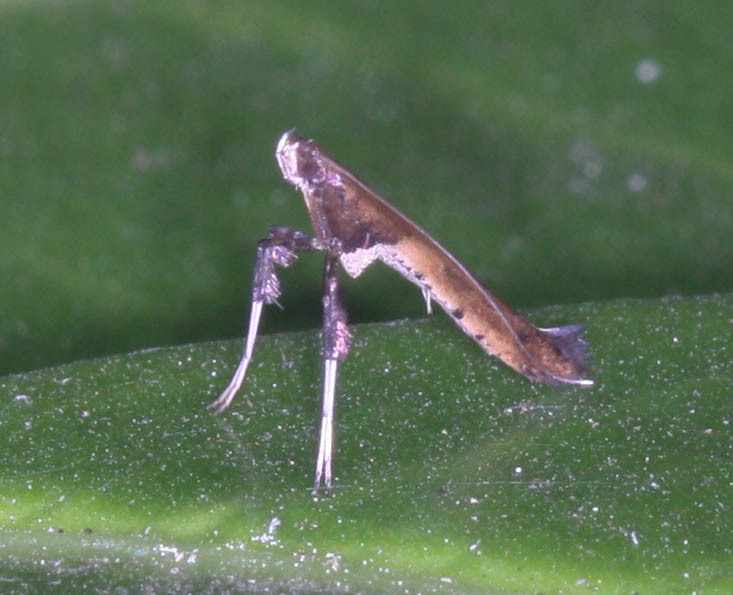

Scientific classification
- Kingdom: Animalia
- Phylum: Arthropoda
- Clade: Pancrustacea
- Class: Insecta
- Order: Lepidoptera
- Family: Gracillariidae
- Genus: Caloptilia
- Species: C. diversilobiella

Binomial name
- Caloptilia diversilobiella Opler, 1969

= Caloptilia diversilobiella =

Species of moth

Caloptilia diversilobiella is a moth of the family Gracillariidae. It is found in the United States (California).

The eggs of this moth are laid on oak (Quercus) leaves. When hatched, the larva at first mines the leaves in a gallery leading to a blotch. The larva then form cones by folding the tips of the leaves, and feeding within. The larvae feed on poison oak (Toxicodendron diversilobum).
