= Cameraria sempervirensella =

Scientific classification
- Kingdom: Animalia
- Phylum: Arthropoda
- Class: Insecta
- Order: Lepidoptera
- Family: Gracillariidae
- Genus: Cameraria
- Species: C. sempervirensella

Binomial name
- Cameraria sempervirensella Opler & Davis, 1981

Species of moth

Cameraria sempervirensella is a moth of the family Gracillariidae. It is known from California, United States.

The length of the forewings is 3.5–5 mm.

The larvae feed on Chrysolepis sempervirens. They mine the leaves of their host plant.
