= Cameraria diabloensis =

Scientific classification
- Kingdom: Animalia
- Phylum: Arthropoda
- Class: Insecta
- Order: Lepidoptera
- Family: Gracillariidae
- Genus: Cameraria
- Species: C. diabloensis

Binomial name
- Cameraria diabloensis Opler & Davis, 1981

Species of moth

Cameraria diabloensis is a moth of the family Gracillariidae. It is known from the California, United States.

The length of the forewings is 3.3-4.3 mm.

The larvae feed on Quercus chrysolepis var. nana. They mine the leaves of their host plant.
