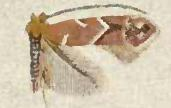

Scientific classification
- Domain: Eukaryota
- Kingdom: Animalia
- Phylum: Arthropoda
- Class: Insecta
- Order: Lepidoptera
- Family: Gracillariidae
- Genus: Cameraria
- Species: C. bethunella

Binomial name
- Cameraria bethunella (Chambers, 1871)

Synonyms
- Lithocolletis bethunella Chambers, 1871; Cameraria bethuneella (Chambers, 1878); Cameraria bethuniella (Dyar, 1903); Cameraria lebertella (Frey & Boll, 1878)

= Cameraria bethunella =

Species of moth

Cameraria bethunella is a moth of the family Gracillariidae. It is known from Ontario and Quebec in Canada, and Illinois, Kentucky, Connecticut, Maine, New York and Texas in the United States.

The wingspan is 6.5-7.5 mm.

The larvae feed on Castanea dentata and Quercus species, including Quercus ilicifolia, Quercus imbricaria, Quercus macrocarpa, Quercus obtusiloba, Quercus rubra, Quercus tinctoria and Quercus velutina. They mine the leaves of their host plant.
