= Cameraria lobatiella =

Scientific classification
- Kingdom: Animalia
- Phylum: Arthropoda
- Class: Insecta
- Order: Lepidoptera
- Family: Gracillariidae
- Genus: Cameraria
- Species: C. lobatiella

Binomial name
- Cameraria lobatiella Opler & Davis, 1981

Species of moth

Cameraria lobatiella is a moth of the family Gracillariidae. It is known from British Columbia in Canada, and California in the United States.

The length of the forewings is 2.8–3.8 mm.

The larvae feed on Quercus douglasii, Quercus kelloggii and Quercus lobata. They mine the leaves of their host plant. The mine is found on the upper side of the leaf. It has an irregular shape. The epidermis is opaque, red brown and usually extends across the leaf midrib. It is a solitary species, but may coalesce with more than one adult eclosing. Normally, there are two parallel folds present. Pupae in mines of the last generation each season overwinter and eclose the following spring after their host's new leaves have expanded.

== Etymology ==
The name of the species is derived from the specific name of its principal host, Quercus lobata.
