= Cameraria temblorensis =

Scientific classification
- Kingdom: Animalia
- Phylum: Arthropoda
- Class: Insecta
- Order: Lepidoptera
- Family: Gracillariidae
- Genus: Cameraria
- Species: C. temblorensis

Binomial name
- Cameraria temblorensis Opler & Davis, 1981

Species of moth

Cameraria temblorensis is a moth of the family Gracillariidae. It is known from California, United States.

The length of the forewings is 3–4 mm (0.12–0.16 in).

The larvae feed on Quercus douglasii, Quercus dumosa, Quercus dumosa × engelmanii, Quercus engelmannii, Quercus turbinella and Quercus × alvordiana. They mine the leaves of their host plant. The mine is ovoid. The epidermis is opaque, yellow green. Mines normally cross the midrib and consume 30%-95% of the leaf surface. The mines are solitary and normally have two folds, although occasionally there are three. The folds are parallel or at slight angles.

== Etymology ==
The specific name is derived from the type-locality (Temblor Range) and the Latin suffix -ensis (denoting place, locality).
