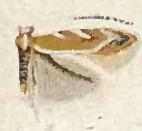

Scientific classification
- Domain: Eukaryota
- Kingdom: Animalia
- Phylum: Arthropoda
- Class: Insecta
- Order: Lepidoptera
- Family: Gracillariidae
- Genus: Cameraria
- Species: C. ulmella

Binomial name
- Cameraria ulmella (Chambers, 1871)

Synonyms
- Lithocolletis ulmella Chambers, 1871; Cameraria modesta (Frey & Boll, 1876)

= Cameraria ulmella =

Species of moth

Cameraria ulmella is a moth of the family Gracillariidae. It is known from Ontario and Québec in Canada, and Texas, Kentucky, Maine, Maryland, Michigan, New York, Georgia, Illinois and Connecticut in the United States.

The wingspan is 6.5–7 mm.

The larvae feed on Quercus alba, Quercus ilicifolia, Quercus rubra, Quercus velutina and Ulmus species (including Ulmus americana, Ulmus fulva and Ulmus rubra). They mine the leaves of their host plant. The mine has the form of a flat mine on the upperside of the leaf. The pupa of the summer brood is formed under a flat silken cocoon. A later hibernating brood changes from the usual green color to a pale yellow color, and passes the winter in silk lined chambers.
