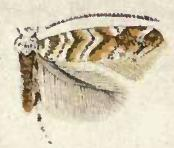

Scientific classification
- Domain: Eukaryota
- Kingdom: Animalia
- Phylum: Arthropoda
- Class: Insecta
- Order: Lepidoptera
- Family: Gracillariidae
- Genus: Cameraria
- Species: C. hamadryadella

Binomial name
- Cameraria hamadryadella (Clemens, 1859)

Synonyms
- Lithocolletis hamadryadella Clemens, 1859; Cameraria alternata (Chambers, 1878); Cameraria alternatella (Zeller, 1875); Cameraria hamadryella (Frey & Boll, 1878)

= Cameraria hamadryadella =

Species of moth

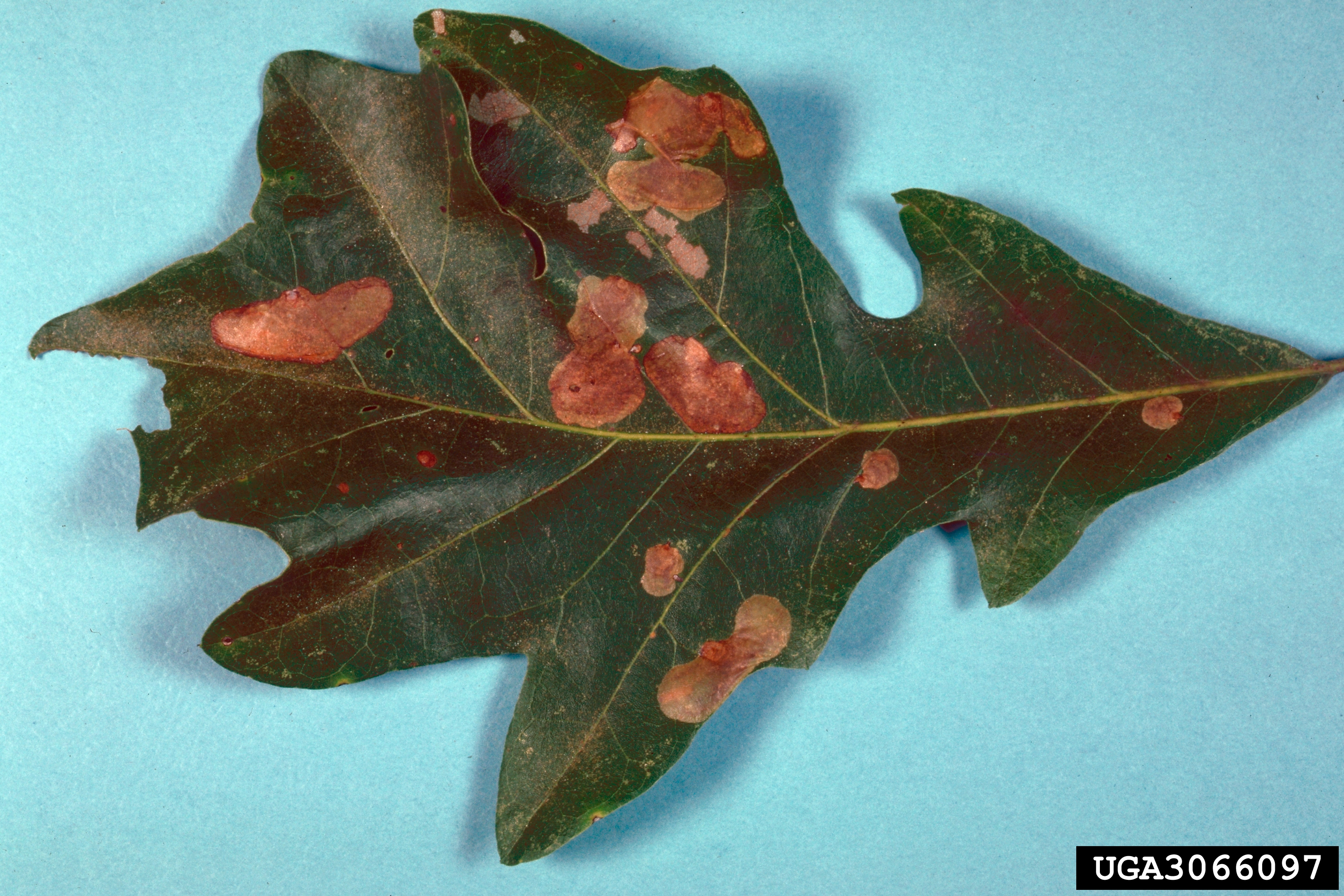
Damage

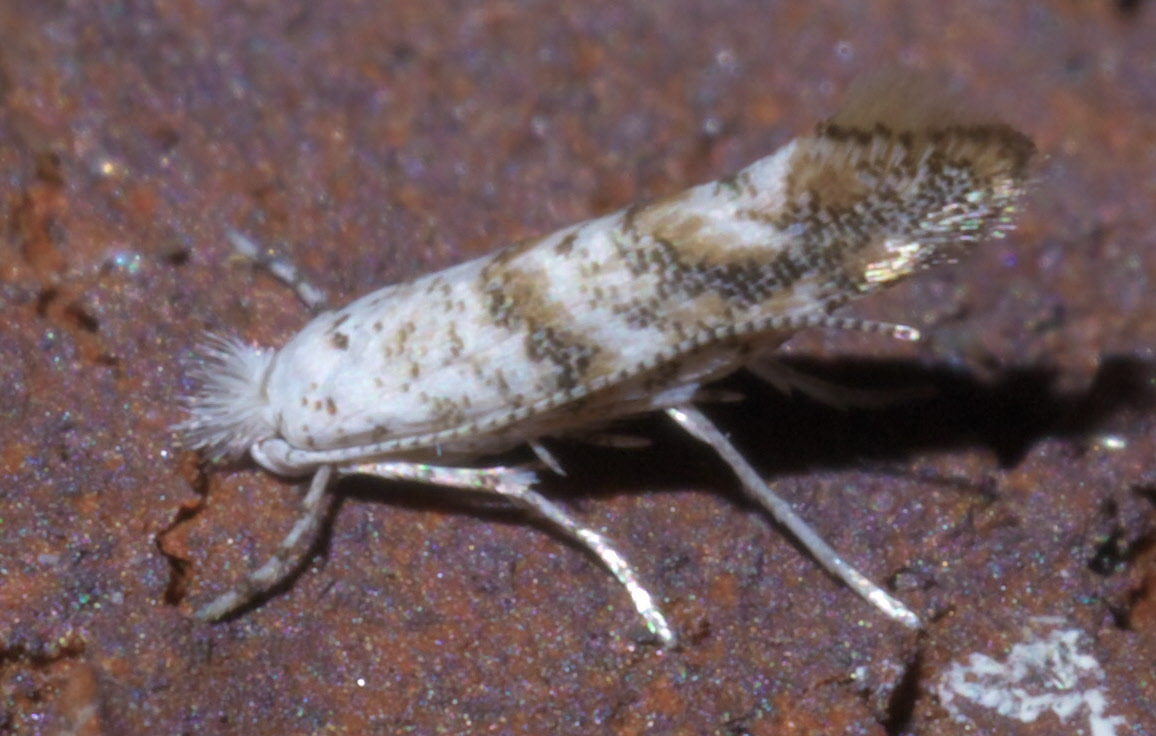
Cameraria hamadryadella, solitary oak leafminer

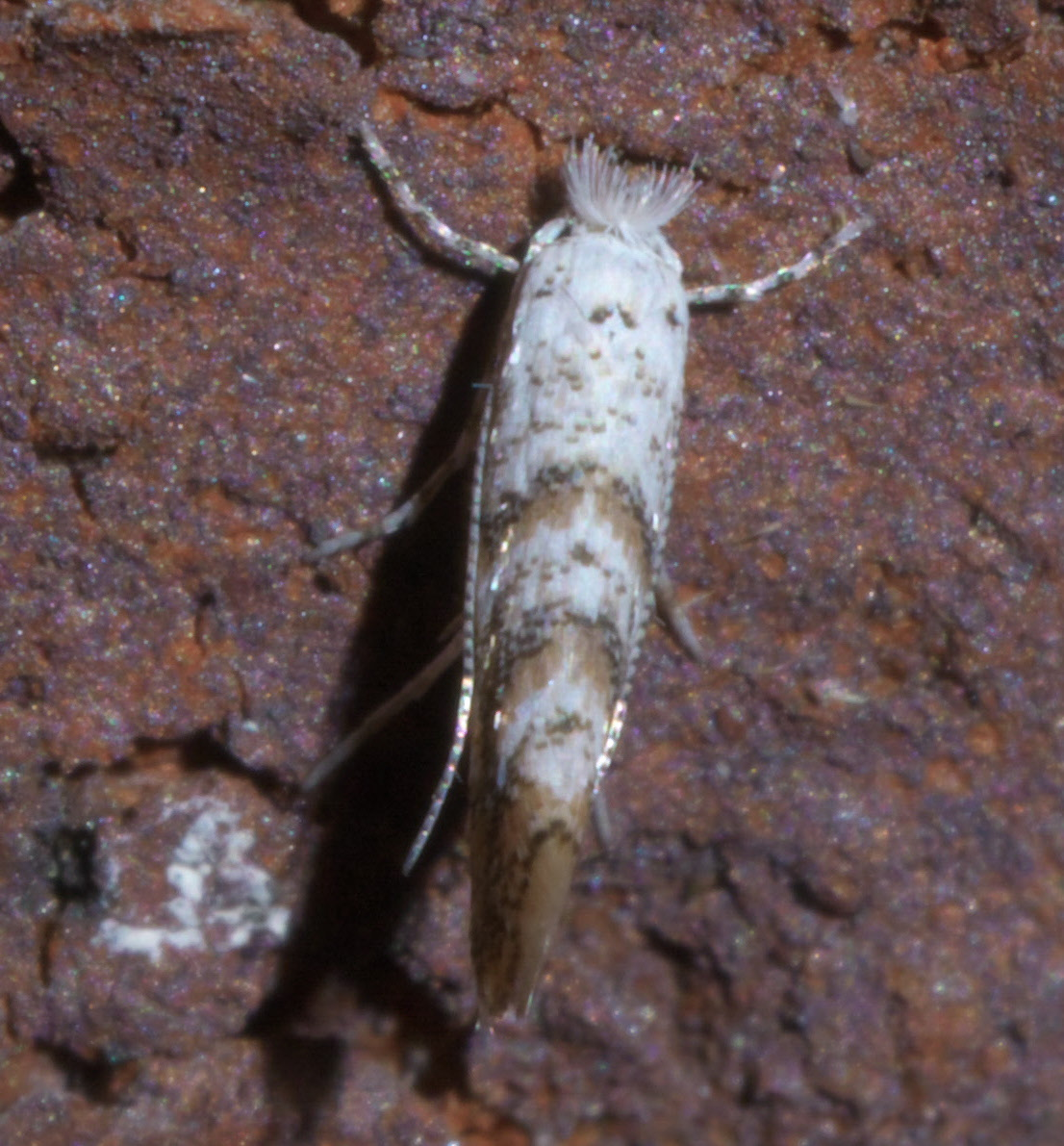
Cameraria hamadryadella, solitary oak leafminer, Size: 3.5 mm

Cameraria hamadryadella, the solitary oak leafminer, is a moth of the family Gracillariidae. It is widely distributed in temperate North America.

The wingspan is 6.5-8.5 mm. Adults are on wing in spring in two generations per year.

The larvae feed on Gaylussacia and Quercus species, including Quercus alba, Quercus benderi, Quercus bicolor, Quercus coccinea, Quercus ilicifolia, Quercus lyrata, Quercus macrocarpa, Quercus macrocarpa, Quercus marilandica, Quercus obtusiloba, Quercus prinoides, Quercus prinus, Quercus robur, Quercus rubra, Quercus stellata and Quercus velutina. They mine the leaves of their host plant.
