= Cameraria walsinghami =

Scientific classification
- Kingdom: Animalia
- Phylum: Arthropoda
- Class: Insecta
- Order: Lepidoptera
- Family: Gracillariidae
- Genus: Cameraria
- Species: C. walsinghami

Binomial name
- Cameraria walsinghami Opler & Davis, 1981

Species of moth

Cameraria walsinghami is a moth of the family Gracillariidae. It is known from California, United States.

The length of the forewings is 4.5-5.5 mm.

The larvae feed on Lithocarpus densiflorus var. echinoides.
