= Eupithecia sonora =

Scientific classification
- Kingdom: Animalia
- Phylum: Arthropoda
- Clade: Pancrustacea
- Class: Insecta
- Order: Lepidoptera
- Family: Geometridae
- Genus: Eupithecia
- Species: E. sonora

Binomial name
- Eupithecia sonora Ferris and Opler, 2008

Species of moth

Eupithecia sonora is a moth in the family Geometridae. It is found in Sonora, Mexico, the Gila River Valley, New Mexico, and the Chiricahua Mountains in Arizona.

The length of the forewings is 8–9 mm for males and 8.5–10 mm for females.
