= Cameraria wislizeniella =

Scientific classification
- Kingdom: Animalia
- Phylum: Arthropoda
- Class: Insecta
- Order: Lepidoptera
- Family: Gracillariidae
- Genus: Cameraria
- Species: C. wislizeniella

Binomial name
- Cameraria wislizeniella Opler, 1971

Species of moth

Cameraria wislizeniella is a moth of the family Gracillariidae. It is known from California, United States.

The length of the forewings is 2.4-4.7 mm.

The larvae feed on Quercus agrifolia, Quercus wislizeni and Quercus wislizeni var. frutescens. They mine the leaves of their host plant.
