= Cameraria pentekes =

Scientific classification
- Kingdom: Animalia
- Phylum: Arthropoda
- Clade: Pancrustacea
- Class: Insecta
- Order: Lepidoptera
- Family: Gracillariidae
- Genus: Cameraria
- Species: C. pentekes

Binomial name
- Cameraria pentekes Opler & Davis, 1981

Species of moth

Cameraria pentekes is a moth of the family Gracillariidae. It is known from British Columbia in Canada, and California and Washington in the United States.

The length of the forewings is 3–5 mm.

The larvae feed on Quercus douglasii and Quercus lobata. They mine the leaves of their host plant. The mine is oblong to ovoid. The epidermis is opaque to green yellow. Mines are all located to one side of the midrib on the lower half of the leaf. They are found along the leaf margin or the midrib and solitary with some leaves supporting more than one mine, usually with many minute parallel folds, occasionally with one or two, more or less pronounced.

== Etymology ==
The specific name refers to the diagnostic form of the vincular process of the male and is derived from the Greek pente (meaning five) and the suffix -ekes (meaning pointed).
