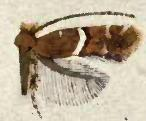
- Adult of Cameraria castaneaeella

Scientific classification
- Kingdom: Animalia
- Phylum: Arthropoda
- Clade: Pancrustacea
- Class: Insecta
- Order: Lepidoptera
- Family: Gracillariidae
- Genus: Cameraria
- Species: C. castaneaeella

Binomial name
- Cameraria castaneaeella (Chambers, 1875)

Synonyms
- Lithocolletis castaneaeella Chambers, 1875; Cameraria castaneella (Meyrick, 1912); Cameraria castanella (Walsingham, 1891)

= Cameraria castaneaeella =

Species of moth

Cameraria castaneaeella is a moth of the family Gracillariidae. It is from the United States (Connecticut, Kentucky, Ohio, Maine and New York).

The wingspan is 6-7.5 mm.

The larvae feed on Castanea species (including Castanea dentata and Castanea sativa) and Quercus species (including Quercus ilicifolia). They mine the leaves of their host plant.
