= Cameraria mendocinensis =

Scientific classification
- Kingdom: Animalia
- Phylum: Arthropoda
- Class: Insecta
- Order: Lepidoptera
- Family: Gracillariidae
- Genus: Cameraria
- Species: C. mendocinensis

Binomial name
- Cameraria mendocinensis Opler & Davis, 1981

Species of moth

Cameraria mendocinensis is a moth of the family Gracillariidae. It is known from California, United States.

The length of the forewings is 3.5–4 mm (0.14–0.16 in).

The larvae feed on Quercus garryana and Quercus lobata. They mine the leaves of their host plant.
