= Cameraria shenaniganensis =

Scientific classification
- Kingdom: Animalia
- Phylum: Arthropoda
- Class: Insecta
- Order: Lepidoptera
- Family: Gracillariidae
- Genus: Cameraria
- Species: C. shenaniganensis

Binomial name
- Cameraria shenaniganensis Opler & Davis, 1981

Species of moth

Cameraria shenaniganensis is a moth of the family Gracillariidae. It is known from California, United States.

The length of the forewings is 3.1–4.2 mm.

The larvae feed on Quercus chrysolepis. They mine the leaves of their host plant.
