= Antaeotricha decorosella =

Scientific classification
- Domain: Eukaryota
- Kingdom: Animalia
- Phylum: Arthropoda
- Class: Insecta
- Order: Lepidoptera
- Family: Depressariidae
- Genus: Antaeotricha
- Species: A. decorosella

Binomial name
- Antaeotricha decorosella (Busck, 1908)

Synonyms
- Brachyloma decorosella Busck, 1908

Species of moth

Antaeotricha decorosella is a moth in the family Depressariidae. It was described by August Busck in 1908. It is found in North America, where it has been recorded from New Jersey, Indiana, North Carolina, Florida and Massachusetts.

The wingspan is 22–24 mm. The forewings are rich deer brown, with a strong silky lustre and with the entire costal edge narrowly light ochreous, at the end of the cell a barely perceptible darker brown spot. The hindwings are whitish fuscous.

The larvae feed on Quercus ilicifolia and Quercus marilandica.
