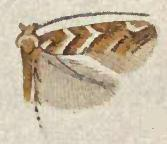

Scientific classification
- Domain: Eukaryota
- Kingdom: Animalia
- Phylum: Arthropoda
- Class: Insecta
- Order: Lepidoptera
- Family: Gracillariidae
- Genus: Cameraria
- Species: C. cincinnatiella

Binomial name
- Cameraria cincinnatiella (Chambers, 1871)

Synonyms
- Lithocolletis cincinnatiella Chambers, 1871; Cameraria cincinnatella (Hagen, 1884)

= Cameraria cincinnatiella =

Species of moth

Cameraria cincinnatiella (gregarious oak leafminer moth) is a moth of the family Gracillariidae. It is known from Ontario and Quebec in Canada, and the United States (including Kentucky, Massachusetts, New York, Ohio, Wisconsin, Florida, Georgia, Illinois, Maryland, Michigan, Pennsylvania, Texas, Vermont, Connecticut and Colorado).

The wingspan is about 15 mm.

The larvae feed on Quercus species, including Quercus alba, Quercus bicolor, Quercus macrocarpa, Quercus obtusiloba, Quercus prinus and Quercus stellata. They mine the leaves of their host plant.
