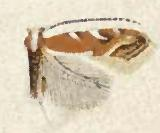

Scientific classification
- Kingdom: Animalia
- Phylum: Arthropoda
- Class: Insecta
- Order: Lepidoptera
- Family: Gracillariidae
- Genus: Cameraria
- Species: C. quercivorella

Binomial name
- Cameraria quercivorella (Chambers, 1879)

Synonyms
- Lithocolletis quercivorella Chambers, 1879

= Cameraria quercivorella =

Species of moth

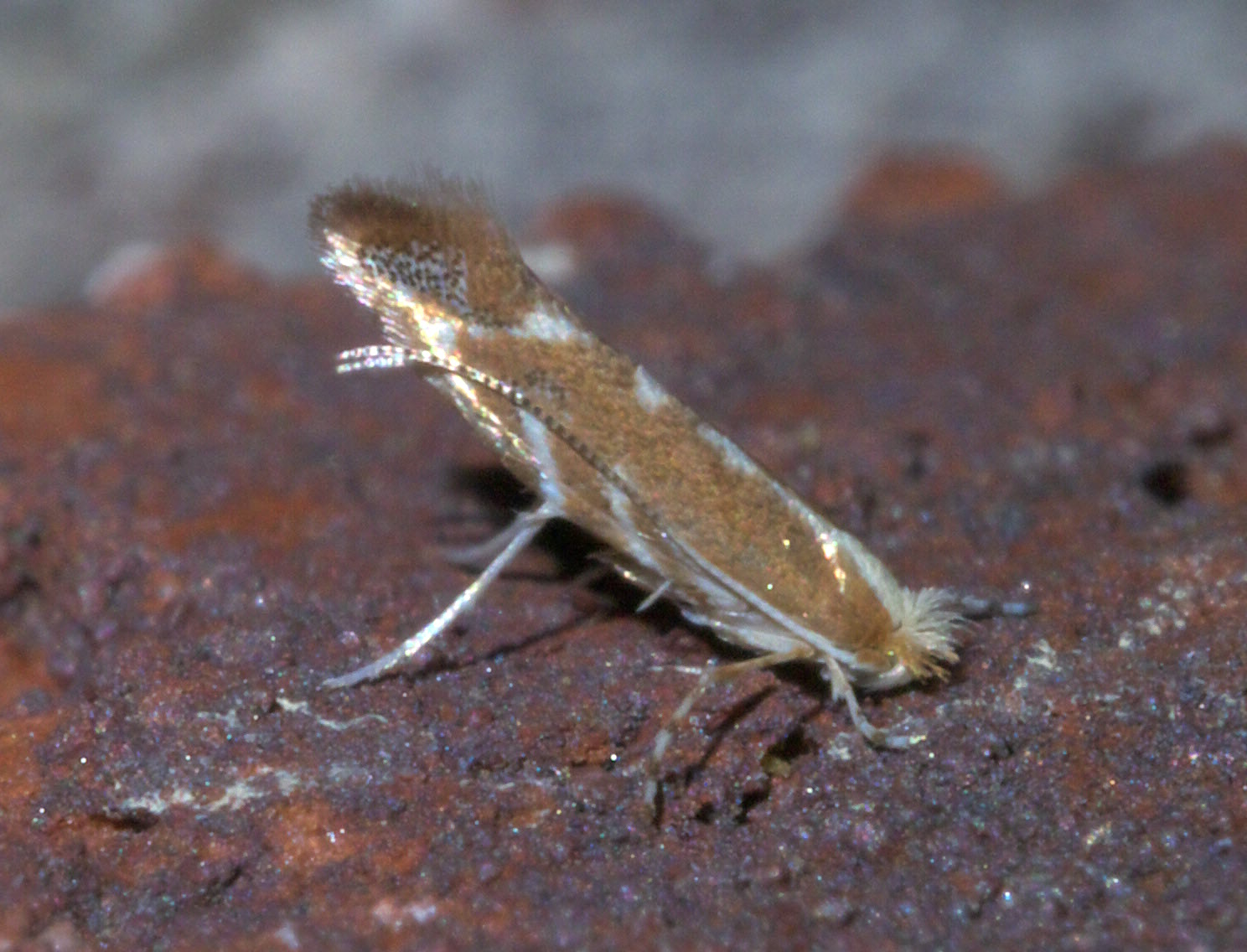
Cameraria quercivorella, Hodges #0835

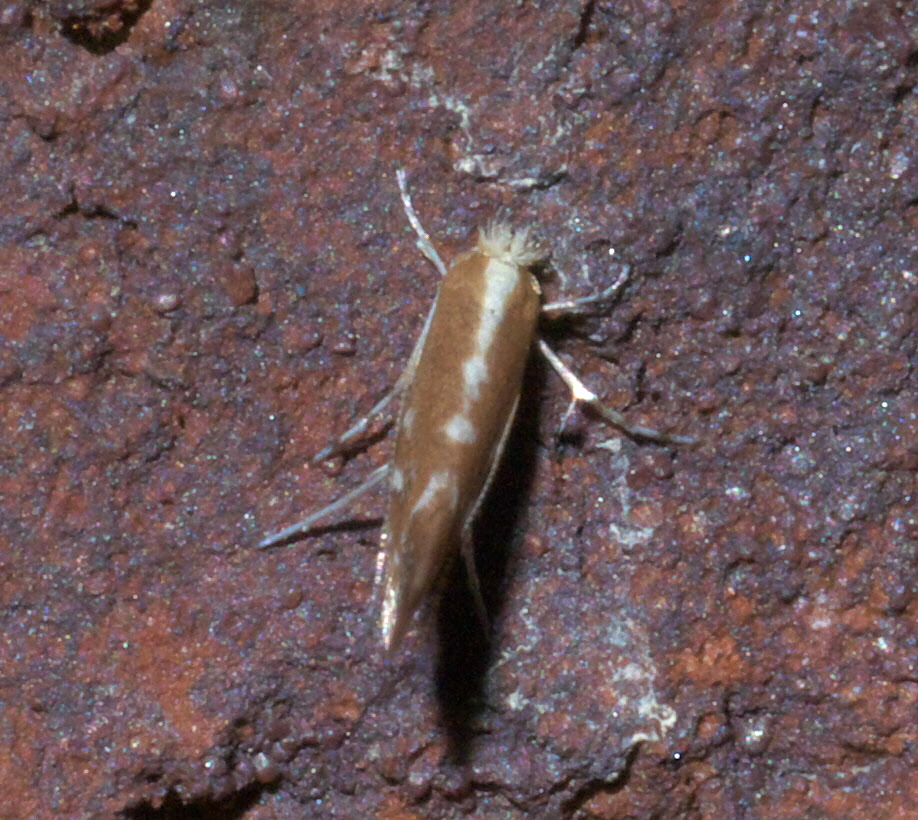
Cameraria quercivorella, Hodges #0835

Cameraria quercivorella is a moth of the family Gracillariidae. It is known from Ontario, Quebec, and Nova Scotia in Canada and Kentucky, Florida, Georgia, Maine, Maryland, Michigan, New York, Texas, Vermont and Illinois in the United States.

The wingspan is 6.5–7 mm.

The larvae feed on Quercus obtusiloba, Quercus rubra and Quercus stellata. They mine the leaves of their host plant. The mine has the form of a blotch mine on the upperside of the leaf.
