= Cameraria obliquifascia =

Scientific classification
- Kingdom: Animalia
- Phylum: Arthropoda
- Clade: Pancrustacea
- Class: Insecta
- Order: Lepidoptera
- Family: Gracillariidae
- Genus: Cameraria
- Species: C. obliquifascia

Binomial name
- Cameraria obliquifascia (Filipjev, 1926)

Synonyms
- Lithocolletis obliquifascia Filipjev, 1926

Species of moth

Cameraria obliquifascia is a moth of the family Gracillariidae. It is known from Tajikistan, Turkmenistan and Uzbekistan.

The larvae feed on Salix and Populus species (including Populus afghanica and Populus alba). They mine the leaves of their host plant. The mine is found on the upperside, or occasionally on the underside of the leaf.
