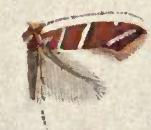

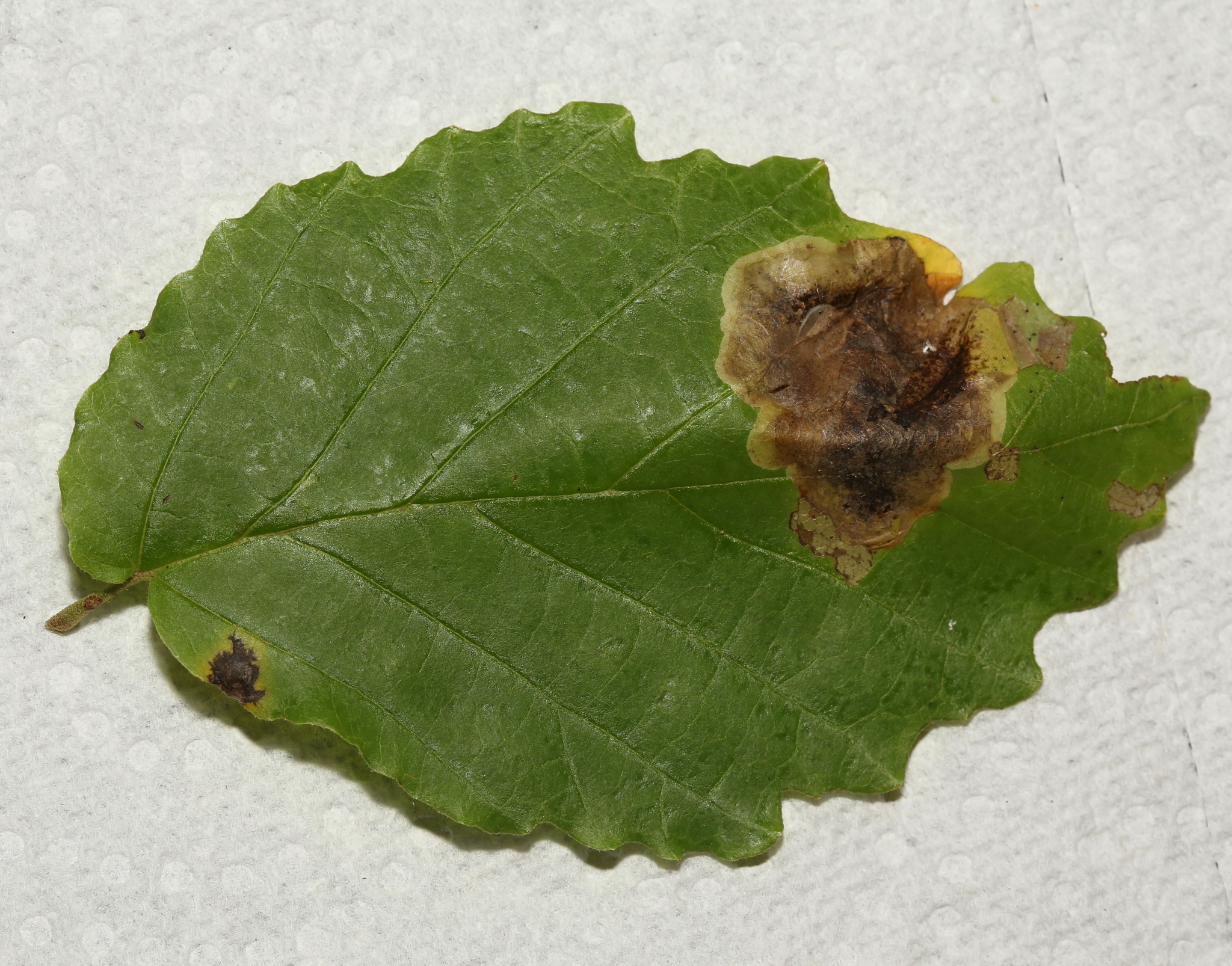
- Leaf mine on Hamamelis virginiana

Scientific classification
- Kingdom: Animalia
- Phylum: Arthropoda
- Class: Insecta
- Order: Lepidoptera
- Family: Gracillariidae
- Genus: Cameraria
- Species: C. hamameliella

Binomial name
- Cameraria hamameliella (Busck, 1903)

Synonyms
- Lithocolletis hamameliella Busck, 1903; Cameraria hamamelis (Riley, 1891)

= Cameraria hamameliella =

Species of moth

Cameraria hamameliella is a moth of the family Gracillariidae. It is known from Ontario, Québec, and Nova Scotia in Canada and throughout the eastern United States.

The wingspan is about 7 mm (0.28 in).

The larvae feed on Hamamelis species, including Hamamelis virginiana. They mine the leaves of their host plant.

This species was first described by August Busck in 1903.
