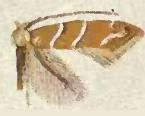

Scientific classification
- Kingdom: Animalia
- Phylum: Arthropoda
- Class: Insecta
- Order: Lepidoptera
- Family: Gracillariidae
- Genus: Cameraria
- Species: C. ostryarella

Binomial name
- Cameraria ostryarella (Chambers, 1871)

Synonyms
- Lithocolletis ostryarella Chambers, 1871; Cameraria ostryaeella (Chambers, 1871); Cameraria ostryella (Meyrick, 1912)

= Cameraria ostryarella =

Species of moth

Cameraria ostryarella is a moth of the family Gracillariidae. It is known from Ontario and Quebec in Canada, and Illinois, Kentucky, Maine, Michigan, New York, Connecticut and Vermont in the United States.

The wingspan is 6–7 mm.

The larvae feed on Ostrya species, including Ostrya virginiana and Ostrya virginica. They mine the leaves of their host plant.
