= Cameraria fara =

Scientific classification
- Kingdom: Animalia
- Phylum: Arthropoda
- Class: Insecta
- Order: Lepidoptera
- Family: Gracillariidae
- Genus: Cameraria
- Species: C. fara

Binomial name
- Cameraria fara de Prins, 2012

Species of moth

Cameraria fara is a moth of the family Gracillariidae. It is found in Cameroon. The habitat consists of riparian woodland with high standing grass.

The length of the forewings is about 2.4 millimetres (0.094 in). Adults have been recorded on wing at the end of November.

== Etymology ==
The specific name refers to the Faro River, the floodplain of which is the type locality.
