= Cameraria acericola =

Scientific classification
- Kingdom: Animalia
- Phylum: Arthropoda
- Class: Insecta
- Order: Lepidoptera
- Family: Gracillariidae
- Genus: Cameraria
- Species: C. acericola

Binomial name
- Cameraria acericola Kumata, 1963

Species of moth

Cameraria acericola is a moth of the family Gracillariidae. It is known from Japan (Hokkaido) and the Russian Far East.

The wingspan is 6.5–8.5 mm.

The larvae feed as leaf miners on Acer mono.
