= Cameraria affinis =

Scientific classification
- Kingdom: Animalia
- Phylum: Arthropoda
- Clade: Pancrustacea
- Class: Insecta
- Order: Lepidoptera
- Family: Gracillariidae
- Genus: Cameraria
- Species: C. affinis

Binomial name
- Cameraria affinis (Frey & Boll, 1876)

Synonyms
- Lithocolletis affinis Frey & Boll, 1876

Species of moth

Cameraria affinis is a moth of the family Gracillariidae. It is known from Quebec, Canada, and the United States (including Connecticut, Texas, Utah and Kentucky).

The larvae feed on Lonicera species (including Lonicera × bella, Symphoricarpos species (including Symphoricarpos orbiculatus) and Triosteum angustifolium. They mine the leaves of their host plant.
