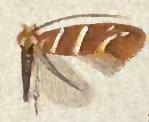

Scientific classification
- Domain: Eukaryota
- Kingdom: Animalia
- Phylum: Arthropoda
- Class: Insecta
- Order: Lepidoptera
- Family: Gracillariidae
- Genus: Cameraria
- Species: C. aceriella

Binomial name
- Cameraria aceriella (Clemens, 1859)

Synonyms
- Lithocolletis aceriella Clemens, 1859

= Cameraria aceriella =

Maple leafblotch miner

Species of moth

Cameraria aceriella, maple leafblotch miner, is a moth of the family Gracillariidae. It is known from Quebec and Ontario in Canada and Connecticut, Illinois, Kentucky, Pennsylvania, Wisconsin, Maine, Maryland, Michigan, New York, and Vermont in the United States.

The wingspan is 7–9 mm. Adults are on wing from the end of May to June.

The larvae feed on Acer species, including Acer rubrum and Acer saccharinum. They mine the leaves of their host plant.

This species was first described by American entomologist James Brackenridge Clemens in 1859.
