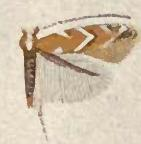

Scientific classification
- Domain: Eukaryota
- Kingdom: Animalia
- Phylum: Arthropoda
- Class: Insecta
- Order: Lepidoptera
- Family: Gracillariidae
- Genus: Cameraria
- Species: C. australisella

Binomial name
- Cameraria australisella (Chambers, 1878)

Synonyms
- Lithocolletis australisella Chambers, 1878; Cameraria australella (Meyrick, 1912)

= Cameraria australisella =

Species of moth

Cameraria australisella is a moth of the family Gracillariidae. It is known from the Illinois and Texas in the United States. The type locality is in Bosque County, Texas.

The larvae feed on Quercus alba and Quercus imbricaria. They mine the leaves of their host plant.
