= Cameraria macrocarpae =

Scientific classification
- Domain: Eukaryota
- Kingdom: Animalia
- Phylum: Arthropoda
- Class: Insecta
- Order: Lepidoptera
- Family: Gracillariidae
- Genus: Cameraria
- Species: C. macrocarpae

Binomial name
- Cameraria macrocarpae Freeman, 1970

Species of moth

Cameraria macrocarpae is a moth of the family Gracillariidae. It is known only from Manitoba, Canada.

The wingspan of the adults is approximately 8 mm. The forewings are gold with three white lines, while the hindwings are light grey with a whitish fringe. Adults start emerging in mid-June and may be present into August, though individual adults likely only live for about two weeks. There is one generation per year.

Adult females lay eggs in rows of up to 12 on the upper side of bur oak leaves, usually along the leaf mid-rib or lateral vein. The eggs are translucent to white in color, and there may be several clusters of eggs on a single leaf. After hatching the larvae enter the leaf and form a common blotch mine near the leaf's upper surface where they feed as leaf miners. Frass is deposited throughout the mine. Mines of larvae from separate egg clusters on the same leaf may coalesce into a single large mine.

The larvae are pale yellow to cream in color with orange heads. The first five of their seven instars are spent feeding in the mine and are present from early July to early October. The heads of the larvae in this stage are more wedge-shaped than those in the final two instars and lack a prominent spinneret. Larvae overwinter in the sixth instar inside the mined leaf. Larvae do not feed during the last two instars. The final instar and pupation occur in spring. Larvae spin a silk cocoon in the mine in which they pupate.

Larvae are parasitized by wasps from several families, including Braconidae, Eulophidae, Eurytomidae, Ichneumonidae, and Pteromalidae.

This species was first described by Canadian entomologist Thomas Nesbitt Freeman in 1970.
