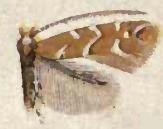

Scientific classification
- Domain: Eukaryota
- Kingdom: Animalia
- Phylum: Arthropoda
- Class: Insecta
- Order: Lepidoptera
- Family: Gracillariidae
- Genus: Cameraria
- Species: C. fletcherella

Binomial name
- Cameraria fletcherella (Braun, 1908)

Synonyms
- Lithocolletis fletcherella Braun, 1908

= Cameraria fletcherella =

Species of moth

Cameraria fletcherella is a moth of the family Gracillariidae. It is known from Québec and Ontario in Canada and Illinois and Maine in the United States.

The wingspan is 8.5–9 mm.

The larvae feed on Quercus species, including Quercus alba. They mine the leaves of their host plant.
