= Cameraria magnisignata =

Scientific classification
- Kingdom: Animalia
- Phylum: Arthropoda
- Class: Insecta
- Order: Lepidoptera
- Family: Gracillariidae
- Genus: Cameraria
- Species: C. magnisignata

Binomial name
- Cameraria magnisignata Kumata, 1993

Species of moth

Cameraria magnisignata is a moth of the family Gracillariidae. It is known from Delhi, India.

The wingspan is 5.5–6.4 mm.

The larvae feed on Pongamia species, including Pongamia pinnata. They mine the leaves of their host plant.
