= Cameraria rhynchophysa =

Scientific classification
- Kingdom: Animalia
- Phylum: Arthropoda
- Class: Insecta
- Order: Lepidoptera
- Family: Gracillariidae
- Genus: Cameraria
- Species: C. rhynchophysa

Binomial name
- Cameraria rhynchophysa Bai, 2015

Species of moth

Cameraria rhynchophysa is a moth of the family Gracillariidae. It was described by Bai in 2015. It is found in China.
