= Cameraria palawanensis =

Scientific classification
- Kingdom: Animalia
- Phylum: Arthropoda
- Clade: Pancrustacea
- Class: Insecta
- Order: Lepidoptera
- Family: Gracillariidae
- Genus: Cameraria
- Species: C. palawanensis

Binomial name
- Cameraria palawanensis Kumata, 1995

Species of moth

Cameraria palawanensis is a moth of the family Gracillariidae. It is known from Palawan, Philippines.

The wingspan is 3.9-4.1 mm.

The larvae feed on Derris elliptica. They mine the leaves of their host plant.
