= Cameraria varii =

Scientific classification
- Domain: Eukaryota
- Kingdom: Animalia
- Phylum: Arthropoda
- Class: Insecta
- Order: Lepidoptera
- Family: Gracillariidae
- Genus: Cameraria
- Species: C. varii

Binomial name
- Cameraria varii de Prins, 2012

Species of moth

Cameraria varii is a moth of the family Gracillariidae. It is found in South Africa. The habitat consists of the urban area of the city of Pretoria.

The length of the forewings is 2.3–2.5 millimetres (0.091–0.098 in). The forewing ground colour is ochreous. Adults are on wing from late October to early November.

== Etymology ==
The species is named in honour of Dr. Lajos Vári.
