= Cameraria pongamiae =

Scientific classification
- Kingdom: Animalia
- Phylum: Arthropoda
- Clade: Pancrustacea
- Class: Insecta
- Order: Lepidoptera
- Family: Gracillariidae
- Genus: Cameraria
- Species: C. pongamiae

Binomial name
- Cameraria pongamiae Kumata, 1993

Species of moth

Cameraria pongamiae is a moth of the family Gracillariidae. It is known from Malaysia (Negeri Sembilan, Pahang, Sabah), the Philippines (Luzon, Palawan) and Taiwan.

The wingspan is 3.8-4.8 mm.

The larvae feed on Pongamia pinnata. They mine the leaves of their host plant.
