= Cameraria borneensis =

Scientific classification
- Kingdom: Animalia
- Phylum: Arthropoda
- Class: Insecta
- Order: Lepidoptera
- Family: Gracillariidae
- Genus: Cameraria
- Species: C. borneensis

Binomial name
- Cameraria borneensis Kumata, 1993

Species of moth

Cameraria borneensis is a moth of the family Gracillariidae. It is known from Sabah, Malaysia.

The wingspan is about 4.2 mm.

The larvae feed on Archidendron species. They mine the leaves of their host plant.
