= Cameraria fasciata =

Scientific classification
- Kingdom: Animalia
- Phylum: Arthropoda
- Class: Insecta
- Order: Lepidoptera
- Family: Gracillariidae
- Genus: Cameraria
- Species: C. fasciata

Binomial name
- Cameraria fasciata Kumata, 1993

Species of moth

Cameraria fasciata is a moth of the family Gracillariidae. It is known from Pahang and Negeri Sembilan, Malaysia.

The wingspan is about 4.2 mm.

The larvae feed on Spatholobus species, including Spatholobus ferrugineus. They mine the leaves of their host plant.
