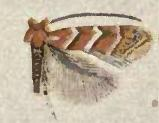

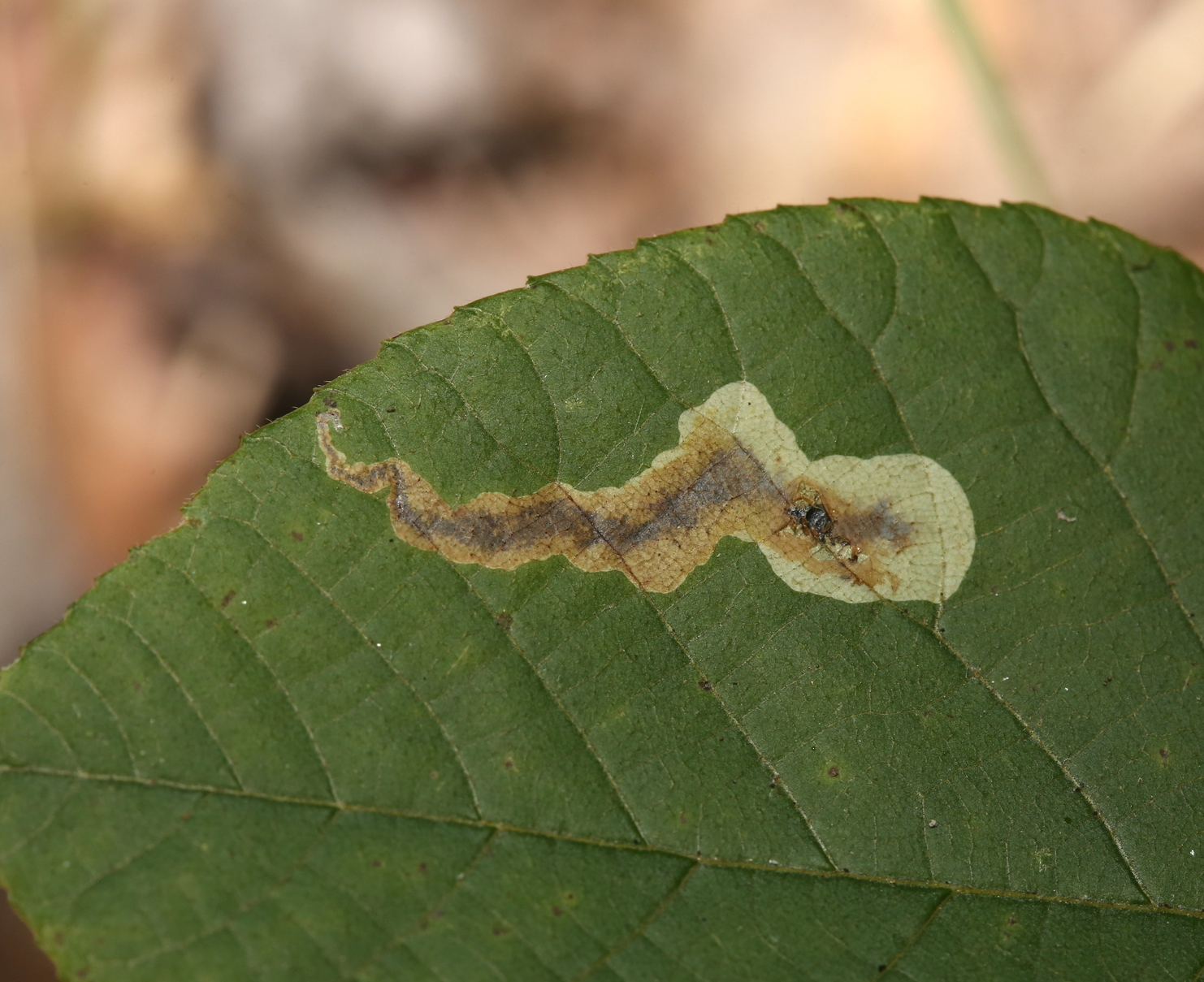
- Leaf mine on hickory

Scientific classification
- Kingdom: Animalia
- Phylum: Arthropoda
- Clade: Pancrustacea
- Class: Insecta
- Order: Lepidoptera
- Family: Gracillariidae
- Genus: Cameraria
- Species: C. caryaefoliella

Binomial name
- Cameraria caryaefoliella (Clemens, 1859)

Synonyms
- Lithocolletis caryaefoliella Clemens, 1859; Cameraria caryifoliella (Meyrick, 1912); Cameraria juglandiella (Clemens, 1861)

= Cameraria caryaefoliella =

Species of moth

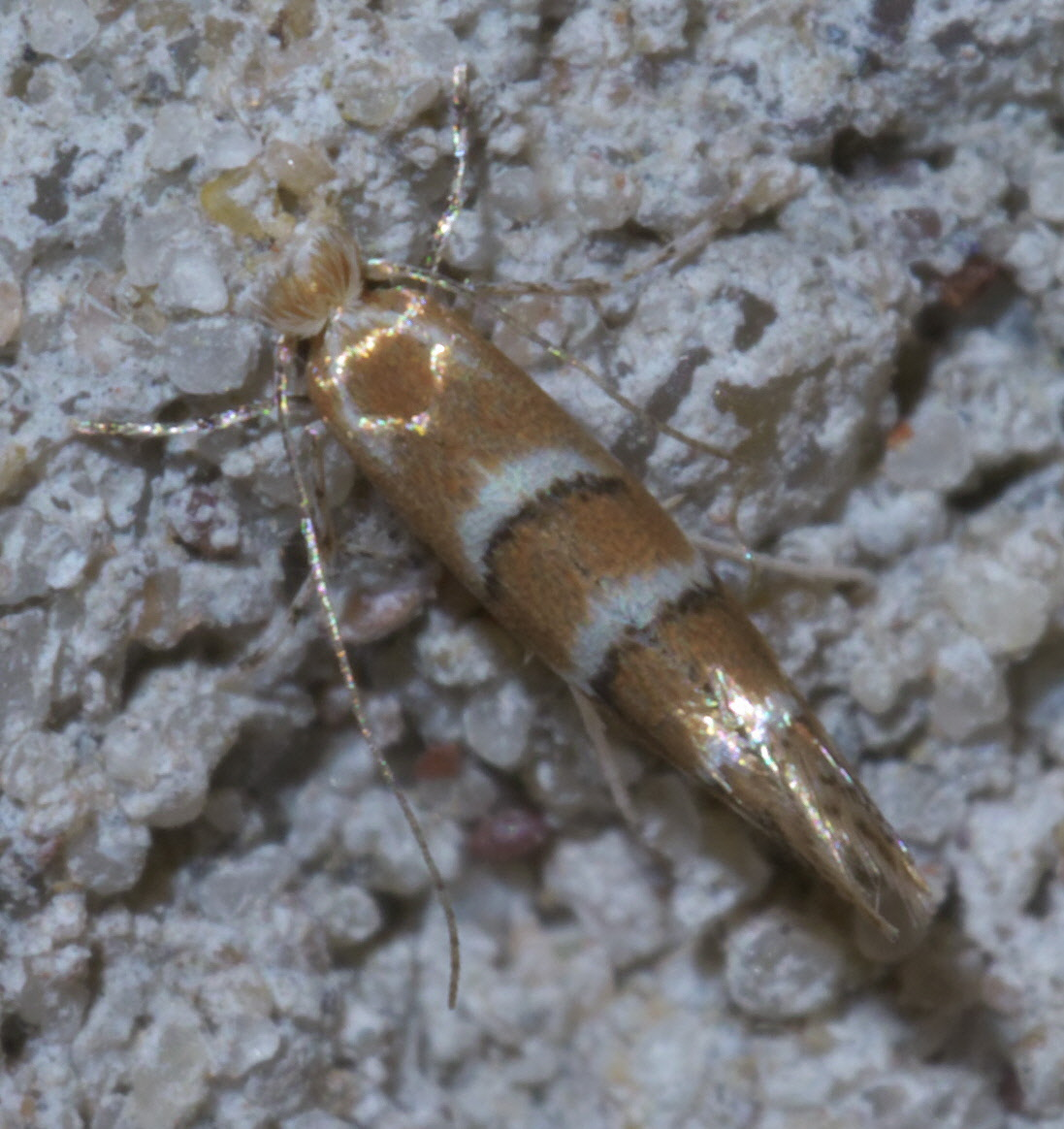
Cameraria caryaefoliella, pecan leafminer (It might be another Cameraria)

Cameraria caryaefoliella is a moth of the family Gracillariidae. It is known from Ontario and Quebec in Canada, and the United States (including Georgia, Illinois, Florida, Kentucky, New York, Texas, Vermont, Wisconsin, Connecticut and Pennsylvania).

The wingspan is 6–7 mm. There are three generations per year.

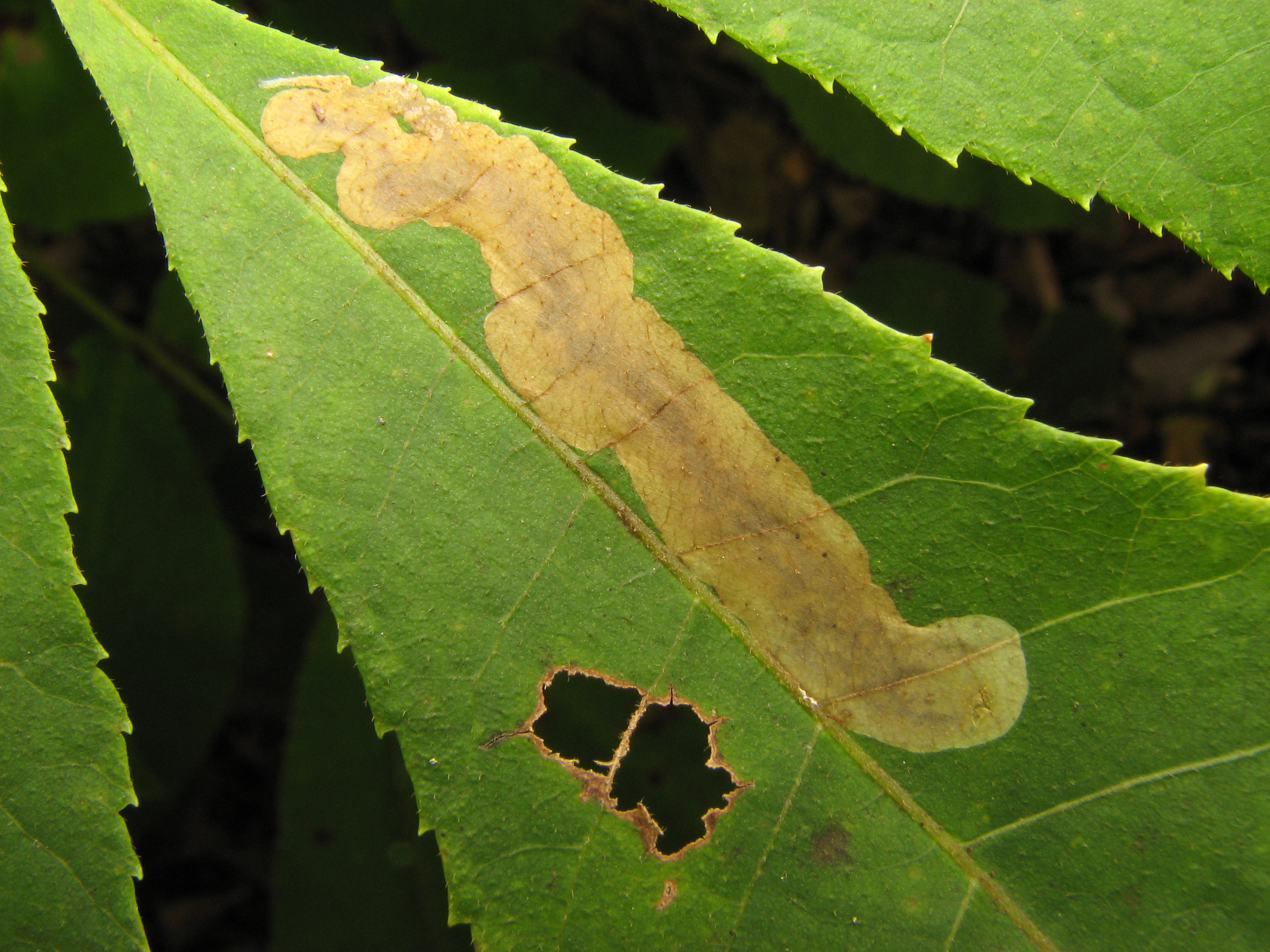
Galleries on hickory leaf
