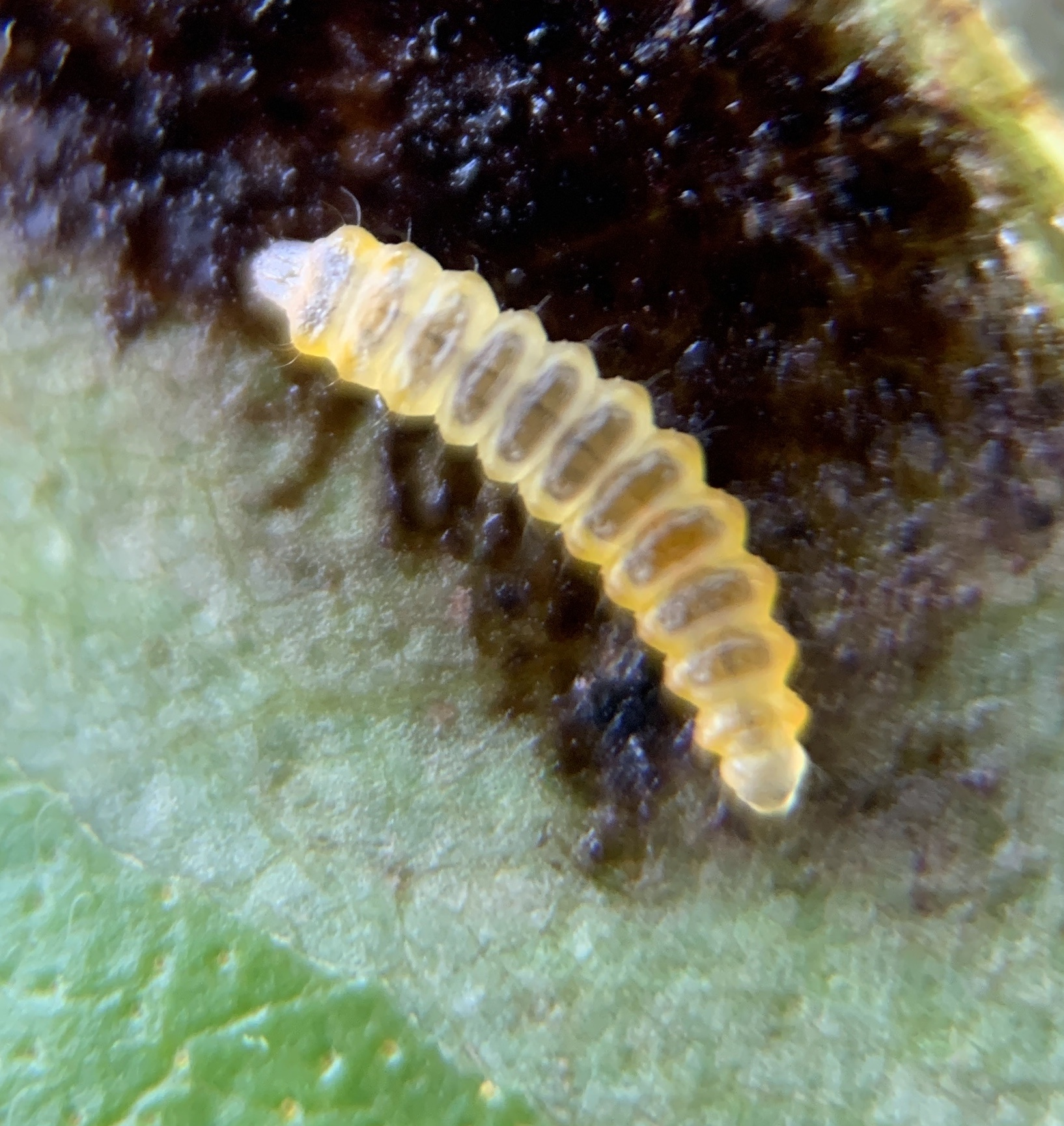
- Cameraria picturatella moth larvae

Scientific classification
- Kingdom: Animalia
- Phylum: Arthropoda
- Class: Insecta
- Order: Lepidoptera
- Family: Gracillariidae
- Genus: Cameraria
- Species: C. picturatella

Binomial name
- Cameraria picturatella (Braun, 1916)

Synonyms
- Lithocolletis picturatella Braun, 1916

= Cameraria picturatella =

Species of moth

Cameraria picturatella is a moth of the family Gracillariidae. It is known from Connecticut, Massachusetts, New Jersey, New York and Maine in the United States.

The larvae feed on Myrica caroliniensis and Myrica pensylvanica. They mine the leaves of their host plant.
