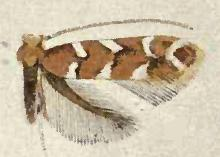

Scientific classification
- Kingdom: Animalia
- Phylum: Arthropoda
- Clade: Pancrustacea
- Class: Insecta
- Order: Lepidoptera
- Family: Gracillariidae
- Genus: Cameraria
- Species: C. gaultheriella

Binomial name
- Cameraria gaultheriella (Walsingham, 1889)

Synonyms
- Lithocolletis gaultheriella Walsingham, 1889

= Cameraria gaultheriella =

Species of moth

Cameraria gaultheriella, the gaultheria leafminer moth, is a moth of the family Gracillariidae. Its native range spans British Columbia to California along the west coast of North America. It is an adventive species in the Netherlands and the United Kingdom, but is not established.

The wingspan is 10–11 mm.

The larvae feed on Gaultheria species, including Gaultheria shallon. They mine the leaves of their host plant.
