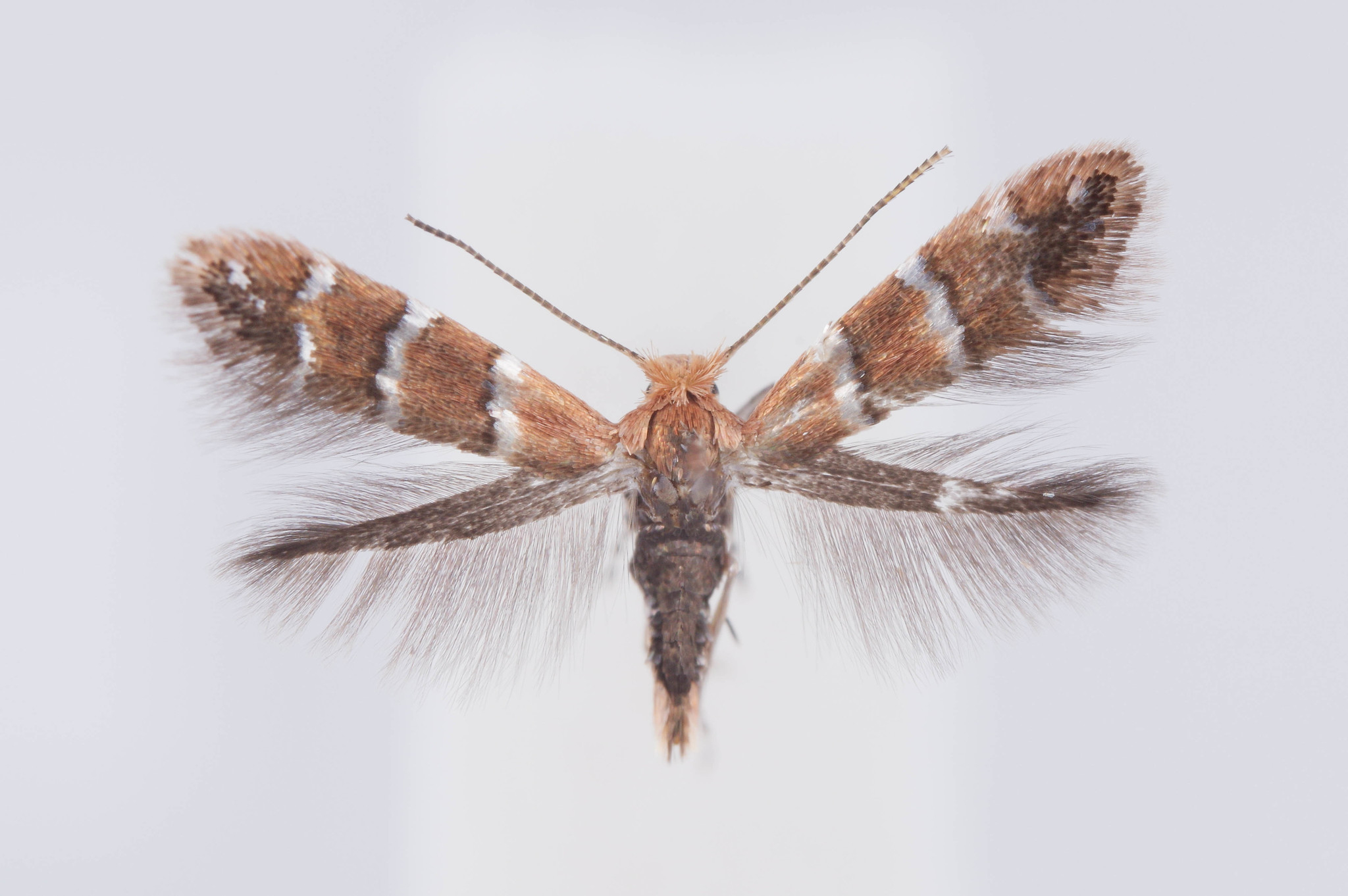

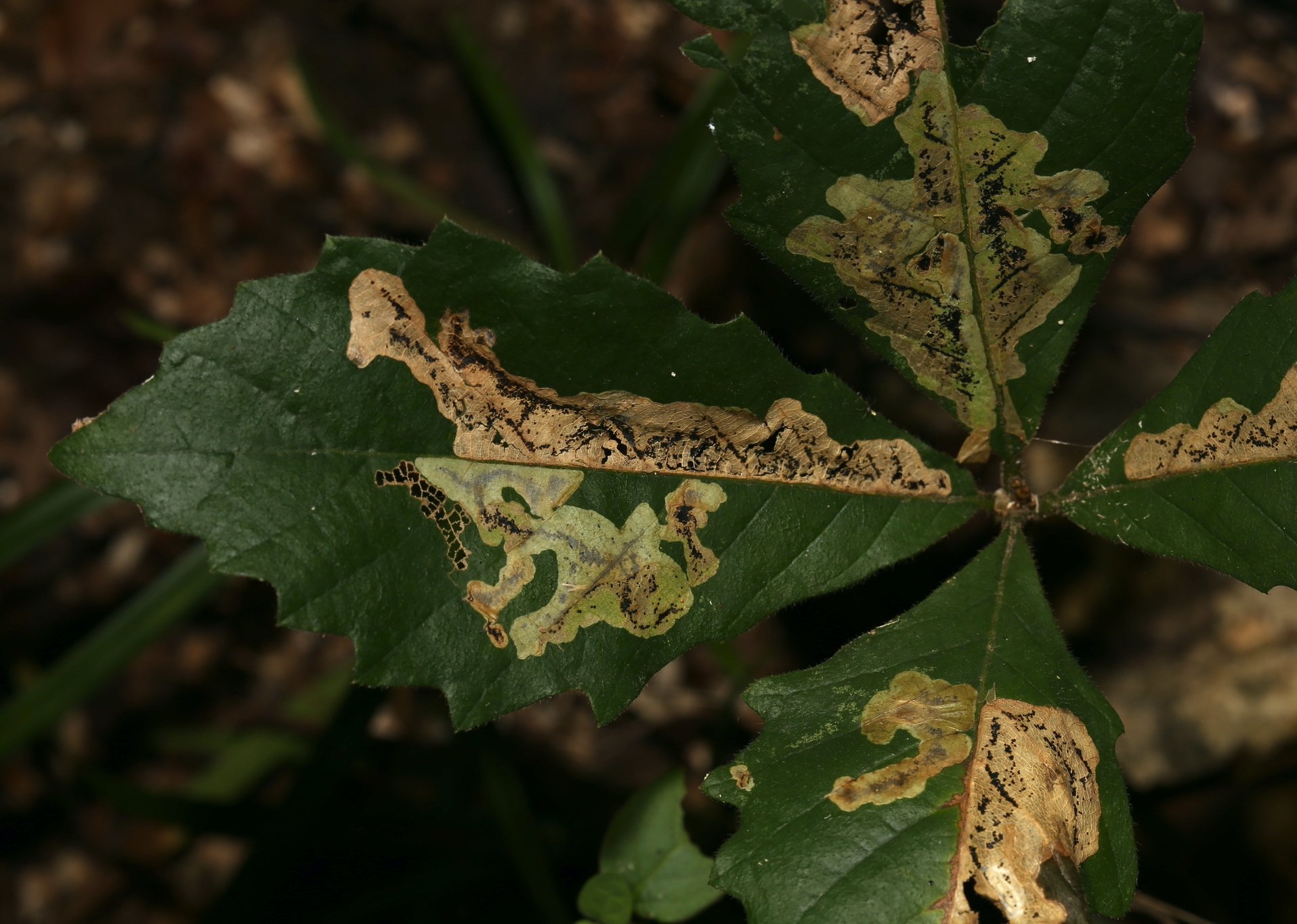
- Leaf mines on Quercus montana

Scientific classification
- Kingdom: Animalia
- Phylum: Arthropoda
- Class: Insecta
- Order: Lepidoptera
- Family: Gracillariidae
- Genus: Cameraria
- Species: C. obstrictella

Binomial name
- Cameraria obstrictella (Clemens, 1859)

Synonyms
- Lithocolletis obstrictella Clemens, 1859; Cameraria bifasciella (Chambers, 1878); Cameraria ceriferae (Walsingham, 1907)

= Cameraria obstrictella =

Species of moth

Cameraria obstrictella is a species of moth in the family Gracillariidae. It is known from eastern Canada (Ontario and Quebec) and the eastern United States (New York, Ohio, Kentucky, Maine, Vermont and Pennsylvania).

The wingspan is 7–8 mm.

The larvae feed on Quercus species, including Quercus acuminata, Quercus alba, Quercus montana, Quercus muehlenbergii, Quercus rubra, Quercus tinctoria and Quercus velutina, as well as Myrica cerifera. They mine the leaves of their host plant.
