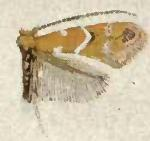

Scientific classification
- Domain: Eukaryota
- Kingdom: Animalia
- Phylum: Arthropoda
- Class: Insecta
- Order: Lepidoptera
- Family: Gracillariidae
- Genus: Cameraria
- Species: C. betulivora

Binomial name
- Cameraria betulivora (Walsingham, 1891)

Synonyms
- Lithocolletis betulivora Walsingham, 1891

= Cameraria betulivora =

Species of moth

Cameraria betulivora is a moth of the family Gracillariidae. It is known from Ontario and Quebec in Canada and the United States (including Maine and North Carolina).

The wingspan is about 7 mm.

The larvae feed on Betula species, including Betula alleghaniensis, Betula lenta, Betula lutea, Betula papyrifera and Betula populifolia. They mine the leaves of their host plant.
