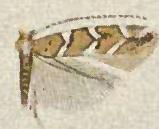

Scientific classification
- Domain: Eukaryota
- Kingdom: Animalia
- Phylum: Arthropoda
- Class: Insecta
- Order: Lepidoptera
- Family: Gracillariidae
- Genus: Cameraria
- Species: C. nemoris

Binomial name
- Cameraria nemoris (Walsingham, 1889)

Synonyms
- Lithocolletis nemoris Walsingham, 1889

= Cameraria nemoris =

Species of moth

Cameraria nemoris is a moth of the family Gracillariidae. It is known from British Columbia in Canada, and California and Maine in the United States.

The wingspan is about 8 mm.

The larvae feed on Vaccinium ovatum. They mine the leaves of their host plant.
