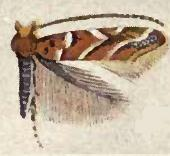

Scientific classification
- Domain: Eukaryota
- Kingdom: Animalia
- Phylum: Arthropoda
- Class: Insecta
- Order: Lepidoptera
- Family: Gracillariidae
- Genus: Cameraria
- Species: C. agrifoliella

Binomial name
- Cameraria agrifoliella (Braun, 1908)

Synonyms
- Lithocolletis agrifoliella Braun, 1908

= Cameraria agrifoliella =

Species of moth

Cameraria agrifoliella is a moth of the family Gracillariidae. It is known from California, United States, and British Columbia, Canada.

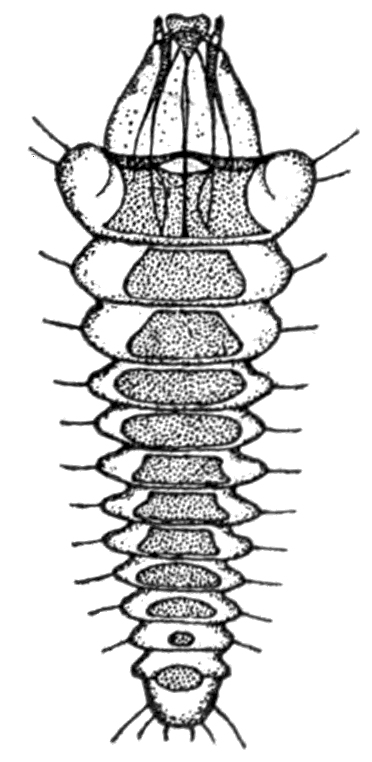
Larva

The wingspan is 7.5–9 mm.

The larvae feed on Chrysolepis chrysophylla, Quercus agrifolia and Quercus virginiana. They mine the leaves of their host plant.
