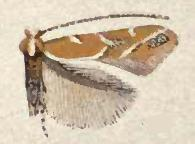

Scientific classification
- Domain: Eukaryota
- Kingdom: Animalia
- Phylum: Arthropoda
- Class: Insecta
- Order: Lepidoptera
- Family: Gracillariidae
- Genus: Cameraria
- Species: C. mediodorsella

Binomial name
- Cameraria mediodorsella (Braun, 1908)

Synonyms
- Lithocolletis mediodorsella Braun, 1908

= Cameraria mediodorsella =

Species of moth

Cameraria mediodorsella is a moth of the family Gracillariidae. It is known from California, United States.

The wingspan is 7–8.5 mm.

The larvae feed on Quercus species, including Quercus garryana, Quercus kelloggii, Quercus lobata and Quercus suber. They mine the leaves of their host plant.
