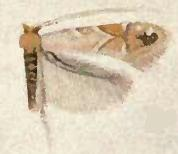

Scientific classification
- Domain: Eukaryota
- Kingdom: Animalia
- Phylum: Arthropoda
- Class: Insecta
- Order: Lepidoptera
- Family: Gracillariidae
- Genus: Cameraria
- Species: C. cervina

Binomial name
- Cameraria cervina (Walsingham, 1907)

Synonyms
- Lithocolletis cervina Walsingham, 1907

= Cameraria cervina =

Species of moth

Cameraria cervina is a moth of the family Gracillariidae. It is known from New York, United States.

The wingspan is about 6 mm.
