= Cameraria trizosterata =

Scientific classification
- Kingdom: Animalia
- Phylum: Arthropoda
- Class: Insecta
- Order: Lepidoptera
- Family: Gracillariidae
- Genus: Cameraria
- Species: C. trizosterata

Binomial name
- Cameraria trizosterata Kumata, 1993

Species of moth

Cameraria trizosterata is a moth of the family Gracillariidae. It is known from Selangor, Malaysia.

The wingspan is 3.7–4.9 mm (0.15–0.19 in).

The larvae feed on Bauhinia species. They mine the leaves of their host plant.
