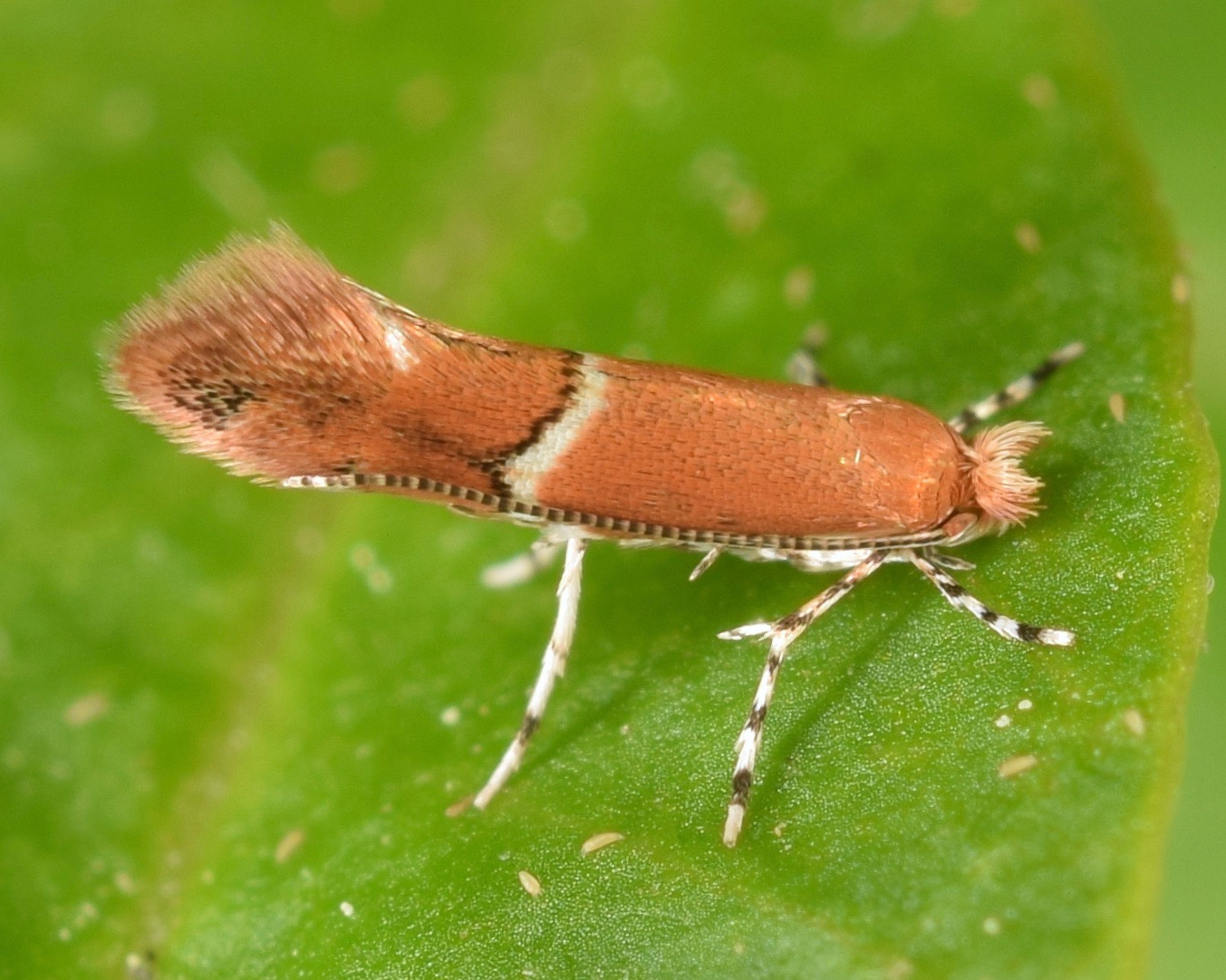

Scientific classification
- Kingdom: Animalia
- Phylum: Arthropoda
- Clade: Pancrustacea
- Class: Insecta
- Order: Lepidoptera
- Family: Gracillariidae
- Genus: Cameraria
- Species: C. fasciella

Binomial name
- Cameraria fasciella (Walsingham, 1891)

Synonyms
- Lithocolletis fasciella Walsingham, 1891; Cameraria unifasciella (Chambers, 1875)

= Cameraria fasciella =

Species of moth

Cameraria fasciella is a moth of the family Gracillariidae. It is known from Kentucky and Ohio in the United States.

The wingspan is 6–7 mm.

The larvae feed on Quercus species, including Quercus tinctoria and Quercus velutina. They mine the leaves of their host plant. The mine has the form of an irregular yellowish blotch mine on the upperside of the leaf.
