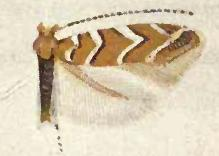

Scientific classification
- Domain: Eukaryota
- Kingdom: Animalia
- Phylum: Arthropoda
- Class: Insecta
- Order: Lepidoptera
- Family: Gracillariidae
- Genus: Cameraria
- Species: C. umbellulariae

Binomial name
- Cameraria umbellulariae (Walsingham, 1889)

Synonyms
- Lithocolletis umbellulariae Walsingham, 1889

= Cameraria umbellulariae =

Species of moth

Cameraria umbellulariae is a moth of the family Gracillariidae. It is known from California, United States.

The wingspan is about 9 mm.

The larvae feed on Umbellularia californica. They mine the leaves of their host plant.
