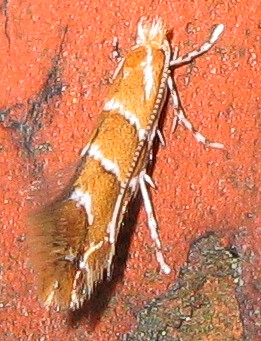
- Horse-chestnut leaf miner, C. ohridella

Scientific classification
- Kingdom: Animalia
- Phylum: Arthropoda
- Class: Insecta
- Order: Lepidoptera
- Family: Gracillariidae
- Subfamily: Lithocolletinae
- Genus: Cameraria; Chapman, 1902

Species
- See text

= Cameraria (moth) =

Genus of moths

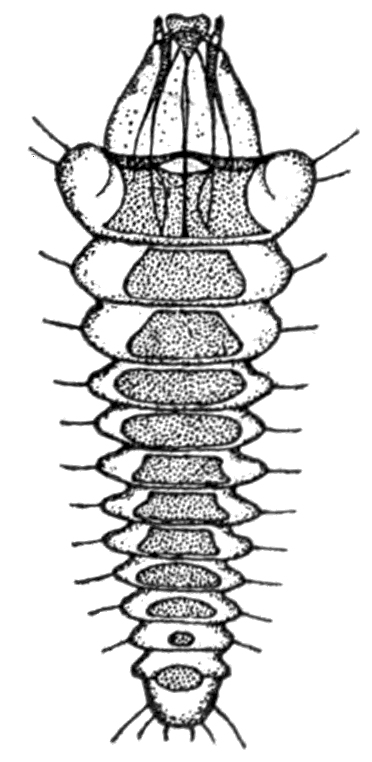
C. agrifoliella larva

Cameraria is a genus of moths in the family Gracillariidae, which includes many species of leaf miners. One of the best known species is the horse-chestnut leaf miner, Cameraria ohridella.

== Species ==
- Cameraria acericola Kumata, 1963
- Cameraria aceriella (Clemens, 1859)
- Cameraria aesculisella (Chambers, 1871)
- Cameraria affinis (Frey & Boll, 1876)
- Cameraria agrifoliella (Braun, 1908)
- Cameraria anomala Opler & Davis, 1981
- Cameraria arcuella (Braun, 1908)
- Cameraria australisella (Chambers, 1878)
- Cameraria barlowi Kumata, 1993
- Cameraria bauhiniae (Stainton, 1856)
- Cameraria bethunella (Chambers, 1871)
- Cameraria betulivora (Walsingham, 1891)
- Cameraria borneensis Kumata, 1993
- Cameraria caryaefoliella (Clemens, 1859)
- Cameraria castaneaeella (Chambers, 1875)
- Cameraria cervina (Walsingham, 1907)
- Cameraria chambersella (Walsingham, 1889)
- Cameraria cincinnatiella (Chambers, 1871)
- Cameraria conglomeratella (Zeller, 1875)
- Cameraria corylisella (Chambers, 1871)
- Cameraria diabloensis Opler & Davis, 1981
- Cameraria diplodura Bai, 2015
- Cameraria eppelsheimii (Frey & Boll, 1878)
- Cameraria fara de Prins, 2012
- Cameraria fasciata Kumata, 1993
- Cameraria fasciella (Walsingham, 1891)
- Cameraria fletcherella (Braun, 1908)
- Cameraria gaultheriella (Walsingham, 1889)
- Cameraria guttifinitella (Clemens, 1859)
- Cameraria hamadryadella (Clemens, 1859)
- Cameraria hamameliella (Busck, 1903)
- Cameraria hexalobina (Vári, 1961)
- Cameraria hikosanensis Kumata, 1963
- Cameraria jacintoensis Opler & Davis, 1981
- Cameraria jiulianshanica Bai, 2015
- Cameraria landryi de Prins, 2012
- Cameraria lentella (Braun, 1908)
- Cameraria leucothorax (Walsingham, 1907)
- Cameraria lobatiella Opler & Davis, 1981
- Cameraria macrocarpae Freeman, 1970
- Cameraria macrocarpella (Frey & Boll, 1878)
- Cameraria magnisignata Kumata, 1993
- Cameraria marinensis Opler & Davis, 1981
- Cameraria mediodorsella (Braun, 1908)
- Cameraria mendocinensis Opler & Davis, 1981
- Cameraria milletiae Kumata, 1993
- Cameraria nemoris (Walsingham, 1889)
- Cameraria niphonica Kumata, 1963
- Cameraria obliquifascia (Filipjev, 1926)
- Cameraria obstrictella (Clemens, 1859)
- Cameraria ohridella Deschka & Dimić, 1986
- Cameraria ostryarella (Chambers, 1871)
- Cameraria palawanensis Kumata, 1995
- Cameraria pentekes Opler & Davis, 1981
- Cameraria perodeaui de Prins, 2012
- Cameraria philippinensis Kumata, 1995
- Cameraria picturatella (Braun, 1916)
- Cameraria platanoidiella (Braun, 1908)
- Cameraria pongamiae Kumata, 1993
- Cameraria quadrifasciata Kumata, 1993
- Cameraria quercivorella (Chambers, 1879)
- Cameraria rhynchophysa Bai, 2015
- Cameraria saccharella (Braun, 1908)
- Cameraria sadlerianella Opler & Davis, 1981
- Cameraria saliciphaga (Kuznetzov, 1975)
- Cameraria sempervirensella Opler & Davis, 1981
- Cameraria serpentinensis Opler & Davis, 1981
- Cameraria shenaniganensis Opler & Davis, 1981
- Cameraria sokoke de Prins, 2012
- Cameraria superimposita (Braun, 1925)
- Cameraria temblorensis Opler & Davis, 1981
- Cameraria tildeni Opler & Davis, 1981
- Cameraria torridella de Prins, 2012
- Cameraria trizosterata Kumata, 1993
- Cameraria tubiferella (Clemens, 1860)
- Cameraria ulmella (Chambers, 1871)
- Cameraria umbellulariae (Walsingham, 1889)
- Cameraria varii de Prins, 2012
- Cameraria virgulata (Meyrick, 1914)
- Cameraria walsinghami Opler & Davis, 1981
- Cameraria wislizeniella Opler, 1971
- Cameraria zaira de Prins, 2012
