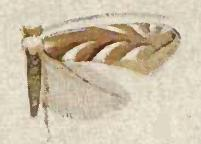

Scientific classification
- Domain: Eukaryota
- Kingdom: Animalia
- Phylum: Arthropoda
- Class: Insecta
- Order: Lepidoptera
- Family: Gracillariidae
- Genus: Cameraria
- Species: C. leucothorax

Binomial name
- Cameraria leucothorax (Walsingham, 1907)

Synonyms
- Lithocolletis leucothorax Walsingham, 1907

= Cameraria leucothorax =

Species of moth

Cameraria leucothorax is a moth of the family Gracillariidae. It is known from California and Oregon in the United States.

The wingspan is about 8.5 mm.

The larvae feed on Lithocarpus densiflorus, Quercus chrysolepis and Quercus densiflora var. echinoides. They mine the leaves of their host plant. The mine is found on the underside of the leaf. The larva consumes the entire leaf substance within the mine and at maturity creates several folds in the lower epidermis between which numerous fine wrinkles can be found.
