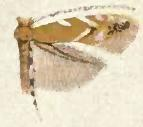

Scientific classification
- Domain: Eukaryota
- Kingdom: Animalia
- Phylum: Arthropoda
- Class: Insecta
- Order: Lepidoptera
- Family: Gracillariidae
- Genus: Cameraria
- Species: C. chambersella

Binomial name
- Cameraria chambersella (Walsingham, 1889)

Synonyms
- Lithocolletis chambersella Walsingham, 1889; Cameraria quinquenotella (Chambers, 1880)

= Cameraria chambersella =

Species of moth

Cameraria chambersella is a moth of the family Gracillariidae. It is known from Illinois and Texas in the United States.

The larvae feed on Quercus species. They mine the leaves of their host plant.
