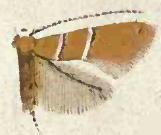

Scientific classification
- Domain: Eukaryota
- Kingdom: Animalia
- Phylum: Arthropoda
- Class: Insecta
- Order: Lepidoptera
- Family: Gracillariidae
- Genus: Cameraria
- Species: C. tubiferella

Binomial name
- Cameraria tubiferella (Clemens, 1860)

Synonyms
- Lithocolletis tubiferella Clemens, 1860

= Cameraria tubiferella =

Species of moth

Cameraria tubiferella is a moth of the family Gracillariidae. It is known from Kentucky, Maine, New York, Maryland and Pennsylvania in the United States.

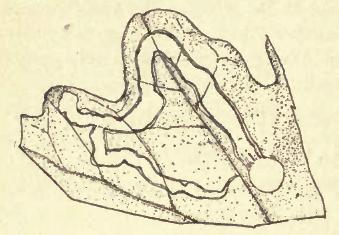
Mine

The wingspan is about 8 mm.

The larvae feed on Quercus species, including Quercus alba, Quercus michauxii and Quercus virginiana. They mine the leaves of their host plant. The mine has the form of a tentiform mine on the upperside of the leaf. The very characteristic mine cannot be mistaken for that of any other species. The mine is often branched, the larva returning toward the beginning of the mine, and starting out anew in another direction.
