= Cameraria perodeaui =

Scientific classification
- Kingdom: Animalia
- Phylum: Arthropoda
- Class: Insecta
- Order: Lepidoptera
- Family: Gracillariidae
- Genus: Cameraria
- Species: C. perodeaui

Binomial name
- Cameraria perodeaui de Prins, 2012

Species of moth

Cameraria perodeaui is a moth of the family Gracillariidae. It is found in the Democratic Republic of the Congo in primary rainforest.

The length of the forewings is 2.1–2.3 millimetres (0.083–0.091 in).
