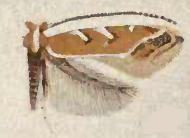

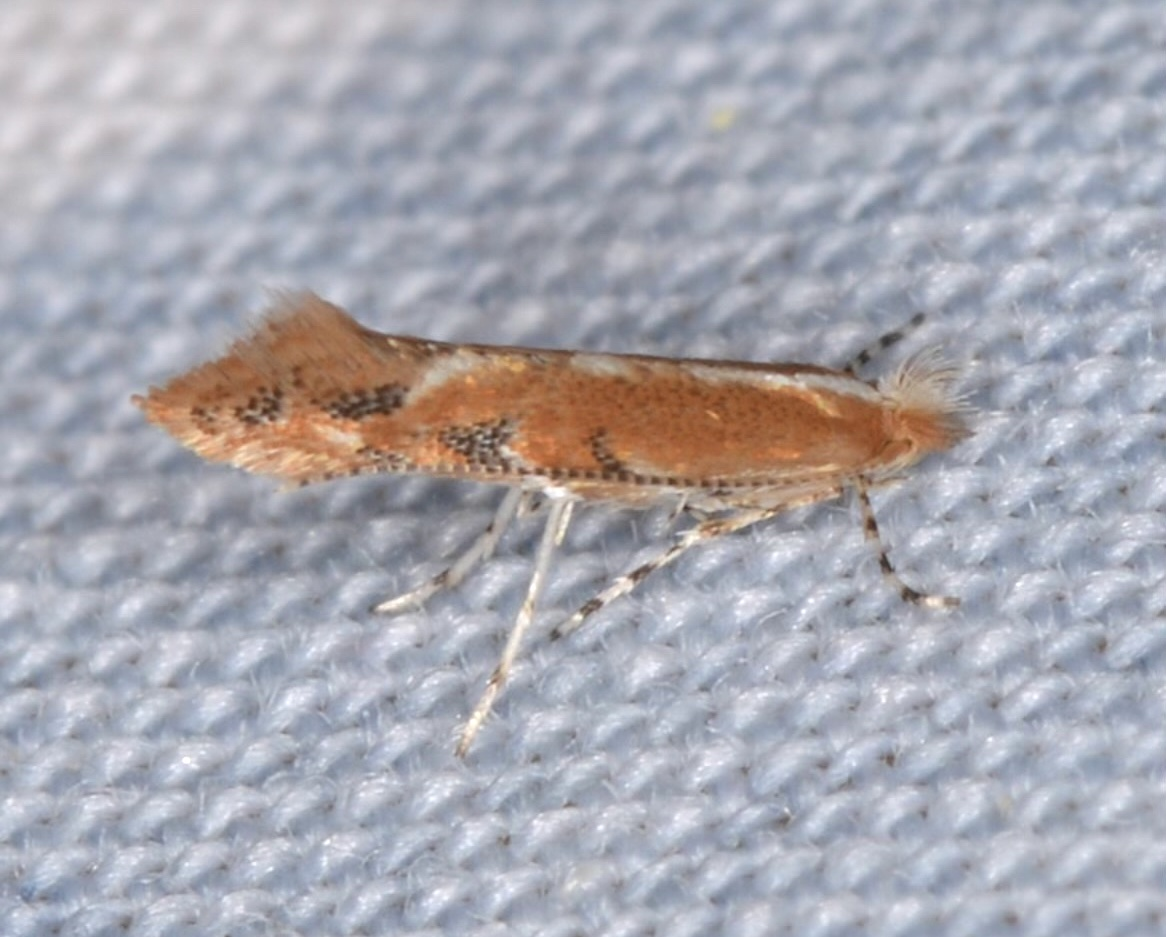

Scientific classification
- Kingdom: Animalia
- Phylum: Arthropoda
- Clade: Pancrustacea
- Class: Insecta
- Order: Lepidoptera
- Family: Gracillariidae
- Genus: Cameraria
- Species: C. conglomeratella

Binomial name
- Cameraria conglomeratella (Zeller, 1875)

Synonyms
- Lithocolletis conglomeratella Zeller, 1875; Cameraria bicolorella (Chambers, 1878); Cameraria obtusilobae (Frey & Boll, 1878)

= Cameraria conglomeratella =

Species of moth

Cameraria conglomeratella is a moth of the family Gracillariidae. It is known from Illinois, Kentucky, Texas, California, Florida, Georgia, Maryland, New Jersey, Ohio and Virginia in the United States.

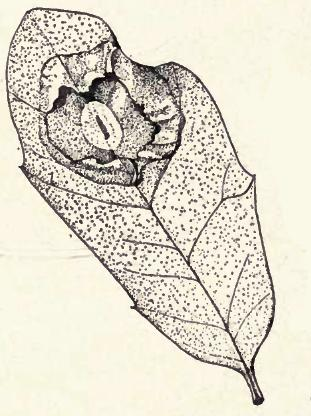
Mine and cocoon

The wingspan is 7.5–9 mm.

The larvae feed on Quercus species, including Quercus bicolor, Quercus chrysolepis, Quercus obtusifolia, Quercus obtusiloba and Quercus virginiana. They mine the leaves of their host plant.
