= Cameraria hikosanensis =

Scientific classification
- Kingdom: Animalia
- Phylum: Arthropoda
- Class: Insecta
- Order: Lepidoptera
- Family: Gracillariidae
- Genus: Cameraria
- Species: C. hikosanensis

Binomial name
- Cameraria hikosanensis Kumata, 1963

Species of moth

Cameraria hikosanensis is a moth of the family Gracillariidae. It is known from Kyushu, Japan.

The wingspan is 7-7.5 mm.

The larvae feed on Viburnum erosum and Viburnum sieboldi. They probably mine the leaves of their host plant.
