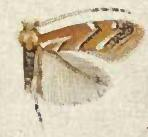

Scientific classification
- Domain: Eukaryota
- Kingdom: Animalia
- Phylum: Arthropoda
- Class: Insecta
- Order: Lepidoptera
- Family: Gracillariidae
- Genus: Cameraria
- Species: C. saccharella

Binomial name
- Cameraria saccharella (Braun, 1908)

Synonyms
- Lithocolletis saccharella Braun, 1908

= Cameraria saccharella =

Species of moth

Cameraria saccharella is a moth of the family Gracillariidae. It is known from Ontario and Quebec in Canada, and Illinois, New Jersey, Ohio, Maine, New York, Connecticut and Vermont in the United States.

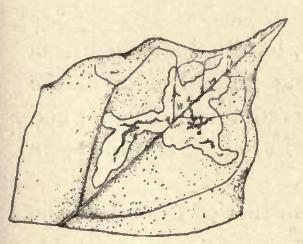
Mine

The wingspan is 5–7 mm.

The larvae feed on Acer species, including Acer nigrum, Acer rubrum, Acer saccharinum and Acer saccharum. They mine the leaves of their host plant.
