= Cameraria virgulata =

Scientific classification
- Kingdom: Animalia
- Phylum: Arthropoda
- Class: Insecta
- Order: Lepidoptera
- Family: Gracillariidae
- Genus: Cameraria
- Species: C. virgulata

Binomial name
- Cameraria virgulata (Meyrick, 1914)

Synonyms
- Lithocolletis virgulata Meyrick, 1914

Species of moth

Cameraria virgulata is a moth of the family Gracillariidae. It is known from the states of West Bengal and Karnataka in India, the Ryukyu Islands of Japan and from Nepal.

The wingspan is 5.1–6.1 mm.

The larvae feed on Butea species (including Butea monosperma), Desmodium species, Pongamia pinnata and Pueraria montana. They mine the leaves of their host plant. The mine has the form of a blotch mine on the upperside of the leaf.
