= Cameraria quadrifasciata =

Scientific classification
- Kingdom: Animalia
- Phylum: Arthropoda
- Class: Insecta
- Order: Lepidoptera
- Family: Gracillariidae
- Genus: Cameraria
- Species: C. quadrifasciata

Binomial name
- Cameraria quadrifasciata Kumata, 1993

Species of moth

Cameraria quadrifasciata is a moth of the family Gracillariidae. It is known from Selangor, Malaysia.

The wingspan is 4.2 to 5.1 millimetres (0.17 to 0.20 in).

The larvae feed on Bauhinia species, including Bauhinia griffithiana. They mine the leaves of their host plant.
