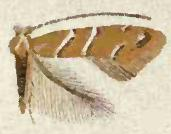

Scientific classification
- Domain: Eukaryota
- Kingdom: Animalia
- Phylum: Arthropoda
- Class: Insecta
- Order: Lepidoptera
- Family: Gracillariidae
- Genus: Cameraria
- Species: C. aesculisella

Binomial name
- Cameraria aesculisella (Chambers, 1871)

Synonyms
- Lithocolletis aesculisella Chambers, 1871; Cameraria aesculella (Riley, 1891)

= Cameraria aesculisella =

Species of moth

Cameraria aesculisella is a moth of the family Gracillariidae. It is known from the United States (Kentucky and Pennsylvania).

The wingspan is 8–9 mm.

The larvae feed on Aesculus species, including Aesculus flava, Aesculus glabra and Aesculus pavia. They mine the leaves of their host plant. The mine has the form of a flat, brownish blotch mine on the upperside of the leaf. It is a broad linear tract sometimes containing as many as five or six larvae. The winter is passed in the larval state, the period of hibernation lasting from August until April of the following year.
