= Cameraria milletiae =

Scientific classification
- Kingdom: Animalia
- Phylum: Arthropoda
- Class: Insecta
- Order: Lepidoptera
- Family: Gracillariidae
- Genus: Cameraria
- Species: C. milletiae

Binomial name
- Cameraria milletiae Kumata, 1993

Species of moth

Cameraria milletiae is a moth of the family Gracillariidae. It is known from Sarawak and Selangor, Malaysia.

The wingspan is 4.5–5.3 mm.

The larvae feed on Milletia sericea. They mine the leaves of their host plant.
