= Cameraria niphonica =

Scientific classification
- Kingdom: Animalia
- Phylum: Arthropoda
- Class: Insecta
- Order: Lepidoptera
- Family: Gracillariidae
- Genus: Cameraria
- Species: C. niphonica

Binomial name
- Cameraria niphonica Kumata, 1963

Species of moth

Cameraria niphonica is a moth of the family Gracillariidae. It is known from Japan (the islands of Hokkaido and Kyushu) and the Russian Far East.

The wingspan is 6–8 mm.

The larvae feed as leaf miners on Acer palmatum and Acer japonicum.
