= Cameraria superimposita =

Scientific classification
- Domain: Eukaryota
- Kingdom: Animalia
- Phylum: Arthropoda
- Class: Insecta
- Order: Lepidoptera
- Family: Gracillariidae
- Genus: Cameraria
- Species: C. superimposita

Binomial name
- Cameraria superimposita (Braun, 1925)

Synonyms
- Lithocolletis superimposita Braun, 1925

Species of moth

Cameraria superimposita is a moth of the family Gracillariidae. It is known from Utah, United States.

The larvae feed on Acer grandidentatum. They mine the leaves of their host plant.
