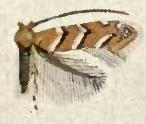

Scientific classification
- Domain: Eukaryota
- Kingdom: Animalia
- Phylum: Arthropoda
- Class: Insecta
- Order: Lepidoptera
- Family: Gracillariidae
- Genus: Cameraria
- Species: C. lentella

Binomial name
- Cameraria lentella (Braun, 1908)

Synonyms
- Lithocolletis lentella Braun, 1908

= Cameraria lentella =

Species of moth

Cameraria lentella is a moth of the family Gracillariidae. It is known from Quebec and Ontario in Canada, and Illinois, New Jersey, New York, Ohio, Arizona, Georgia, Maine, Maryland, Vermont, Connecticut and Washington in the United States.

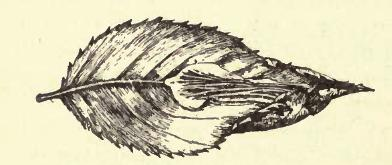
Mine

The wingspan is 6.5–7 mm.

The larvae feed on Ostrya species (including Ostrya virginiana). They mine the leaves of their host plant. The mine has the form of a blotch mine on the upperside of the leaf. There are numerous longitudinal folds in the loosened epidermis at maturity, causing the opposite halves of the leaf to approach one another.
