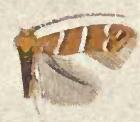

Scientific classification
- Domain: Eukaryota
- Kingdom: Animalia
- Phylum: Arthropoda
- Class: Insecta
- Order: Lepidoptera
- Family: Gracillariidae
- Genus: Cameraria
- Species: C. corylisella

Binomial name
- Cameraria corylisella (Chambers, 1871)

Synonyms
- Lithocolletis corylisella Chambers, 1871; Cameraria bifasciella Walsingham, 1907; Cameraria corylella (Meyrick, 1912); Cameraria coryliella (Chambers, 1871); Cameraria coryliella (Chambers, 1879)

= Cameraria corylisella =

Species of moth

Cameraria corylisella is a moth of the family Gracillariidae. It is known from Manitoba, Ontario, and Quebec in Canada, and Kentucky, Wisconsin, Maine, New York, Connecticut and Vermont in the United States.

The wingspan is 6.5–7 mm.

The larvae feed on Carpinus americana, Carpinus caroliniana, Corylus species (including Corylus americana) and Ostrya virginica. They mine the leaves of their host plant.
