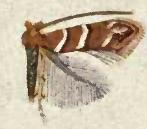

Scientific classification
- Domain: Eukaryota
- Kingdom: Animalia
- Phylum: Arthropoda
- Class: Insecta
- Order: Lepidoptera
- Family: Gracillariidae
- Genus: Cameraria
- Species: C. guttifinitella

Binomial name
- Cameraria guttifinitella (Clemens, 1859)

Synonyms
- Lithocolletis guttifinitella Clemens, 1859; Cameraria toxicodendri (Frey & Boll, 1878)

= Cameraria guttifinitella =

Species of moth

Cameraria guttifinitella is a moth of the family Gracillariidae. It is widespread in North America.

The wingspan is about 7 mm.

The larvae feed on Toxicodendron pubescens and Toxicodendron radicans. They mine the leaves of their host plant.

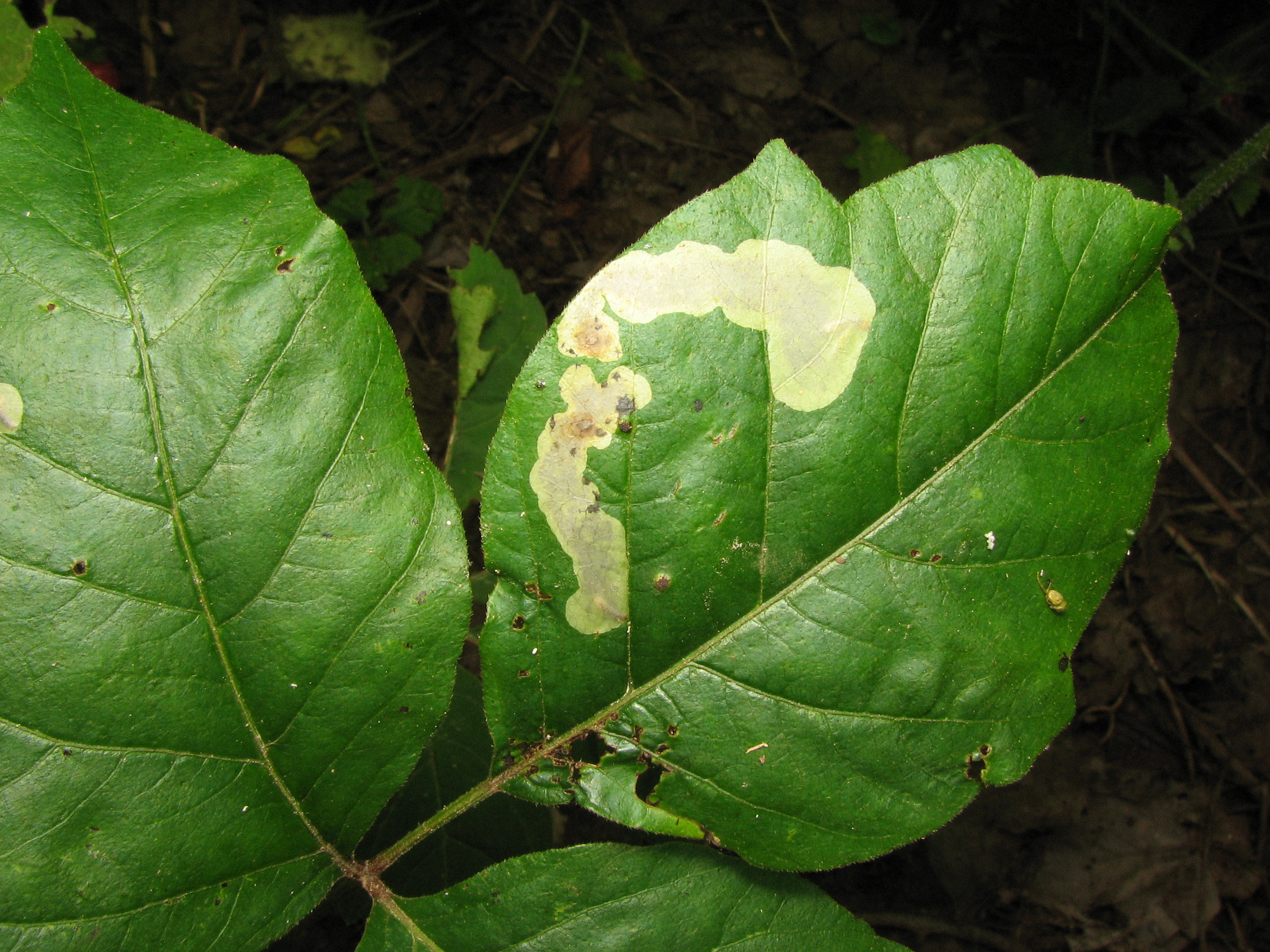
Galleries on poison ivy leaf
