= Cameraria landryi =

Scientific classification
- Kingdom: Animalia
- Phylum: Arthropoda
- Class: Insecta
- Order: Lepidoptera
- Family: Gracillariidae
- Genus: Cameraria
- Species: C. landryi

Binomial name
- Cameraria landryi de Prins, 2012

Species of moth

Cameraria landryi is a moth of the family Gracillariidae. It is found in the Democratic Republic of the Congo. The habitat consists of Central African primary rain forest.

The length of the forewings is 2.2–2.4 millimetres (0.087–0.094 in). Adults are on wing from late March to late May.
