= Cameraria bauhiniae =

Scientific classification
- Domain: Eukaryota
- Kingdom: Animalia
- Phylum: Arthropoda
- Class: Insecta
- Order: Lepidoptera
- Family: Gracillariidae
- Genus: Cameraria
- Species: C. bauhiniae

Binomial name
- Cameraria bauhiniae (Stainton, 1856)

Synonyms
- Lithocolletis bauhiniae Stainton, 1856

Species of moth

Cameraria bauhiniae is a moth of the family Gracillariidae. It is known from India (West Bengal, Maharashtra and Karnataka).

The wingspan is 5.3-5.9 mm.

The larvae feed on Bauhinia acuminata and Bauhinia purpurea. They mine the leaves of their host plant.
