= Cameraria zaira =

Scientific classification
- Kingdom: Animalia
- Phylum: Arthropoda
- Class: Insecta
- Order: Lepidoptera
- Family: Gracillariidae
- Genus: Cameraria
- Species: C. zaira

Binomial name
- Cameraria zaira de Prins, 2012

Species of moth

Cameraria zaira is a moth of the family Gracillariidae. It is found in the Democratic Republic of the Congo.

The length of the forewings is about 2.8 millimetres (0.11 in).

== Etymology ==
The specific name zaira refers to Zaire, the former name of the Democratic Republic of the Congo, where the species was originally discovered.
