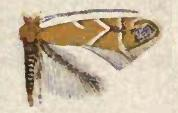

Scientific classification
- Kingdom: Animalia
- Phylum: Arthropoda
- Class: Insecta
- Order: Lepidoptera
- Family: Gracillariidae
- Genus: Cameraria
- Species: C. platanoidiella

Binomial name
- Cameraria platanoidiella (Braun, 1908)

Synonyms
- Lithocolletis platanoidiella Braun, 1908; Cameraria platanoidella Maier, 1988

= Cameraria platanoidiella =

Species of moth

Cameraria platanoidiella is a moth of the family Gracillariidae. It is known from Connecticut, New York and Ohio in the United States.

The wingspan is 6.5–8 mm.

The larvae feed on Quercus species, including Quercus alba, Quercus bicolor and Quercus macrocarpa. They mine the leaves of their host plant.
