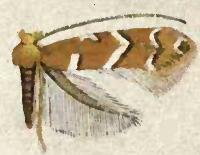

Scientific classification
- Domain: Eukaryota
- Kingdom: Animalia
- Phylum: Arthropoda
- Class: Insecta
- Order: Lepidoptera
- Family: Gracillariidae
- Genus: Cameraria
- Species: C. arcuella

Binomial name
- Cameraria arcuella (Braun, 1908)

Synonyms
- Lithocolletis arcuella Braun, 1908

= Cameraria arcuella =

Species of moth

Cameraria arcuella is a moth of the family Gracillariidae. It is known from Ontario and Québec in Canada and Virginia and Maine in the United States.

The wingspan is about 10 mm.

The larvae may feed on Quercus species. They probably mine the leaves of their host plant.
