= Cameraria eppelsheimii =

Scientific classification
- Kingdom: Animalia
- Phylum: Arthropoda
- Clade: Pancrustacea
- Class: Insecta
- Order: Lepidoptera
- Family: Gracillariidae
- Genus: Cameraria
- Species: C. eppelsheimii

Binomial name
- Cameraria eppelsheimii (Frey & Boll, 1878)

Synonyms
- Lithocolletis eppelsheimii Frey & Boll, 1878

Species of moth

Cameraria eppelsheimii is a moth of the family Gracillariidae. It is known from Texas, United States.

The larvae feed on Carya species. They mine the leaves of their host plant.
