= Cameraria philippinensis =

Scientific classification
- Kingdom: Animalia
- Phylum: Arthropoda
- Class: Insecta
- Order: Lepidoptera
- Family: Gracillariidae
- Genus: Cameraria
- Species: C. philippinensis

Binomial name
- Cameraria philippinensis Kumata, 1995

Species of moth

Cameraria philippinensis is a moth of the family Gracillariidae. It is known from Luzon in the Philippines.

The wingspan is 4–6 mm.

The larvae feed on Bauhinia malabarica. They mine the leaves of their host plant.
