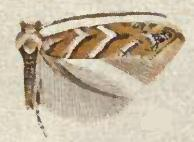

Scientific classification
- Kingdom: Animalia
- Phylum: Arthropoda
- Clade: Pancrustacea
- Class: Insecta
- Order: Lepidoptera
- Family: Gracillariidae
- Genus: Cameraria
- Species: C. macrocarpella

Binomial name
- Cameraria macrocarpella (Frey & Boll, 1878)

Synonyms
- Lithocolletis macrocarpella Frey & Boll, 1878

= Cameraria macrocarpella =

Species of moth

Cameraria macrocarpella is a moth of the family Gracillariidae. It is known from Ontario and Quebec in Canada, and New Jersey, Texas, Maine, Maryland, New York, Illinois and Vermont in the United States.

The wingspan is 8.5–9 mm.

The larvae feed on Castanea species and Quercus macrocarpa. They mine the leaves of their host plant.
