= Cameraria barlowi =

Scientific classification
- Kingdom: Animalia
- Phylum: Arthropoda
- Class: Insecta
- Order: Lepidoptera
- Family: Gracillariidae
- Genus: Cameraria
- Species: C. barlowi

Binomial name
- Cameraria barlowi Kumata, 1993

Species of moth

Cameraria barlowi is a moth of the family Gracillariidae. It is found in Pahang, Malaysia, and in Vietnam.

The wingspan is about 3.2 mm.
