= Cameraria hexalobina =

Scientific classification
- Kingdom: Animalia
- Phylum: Arthropoda
- Class: Insecta
- Order: Lepidoptera
- Family: Gracillariidae
- Genus: Cameraria
- Species: C. hexalobina

Binomial name
- Cameraria hexalobina (Vári, 1961)

Synonyms
- Lithocolletis hexalobina Vári, 1961; Phyllonorycter hexalobina

Species of moth

Cameraria hexalobina is a moth of the family Gracillariidae. It is known from South Africa and the Democratic Republic of the Congo. The habitat consists of savannah vegetation with high standing dry grass.

The length of the forewings is 2.9–3.1 mm. Adults are on wing from late March to late April.

The larvae feed on Hexalobus glabrescens and Hexalobus monopetalus. They mine the leaves of their host plant.
