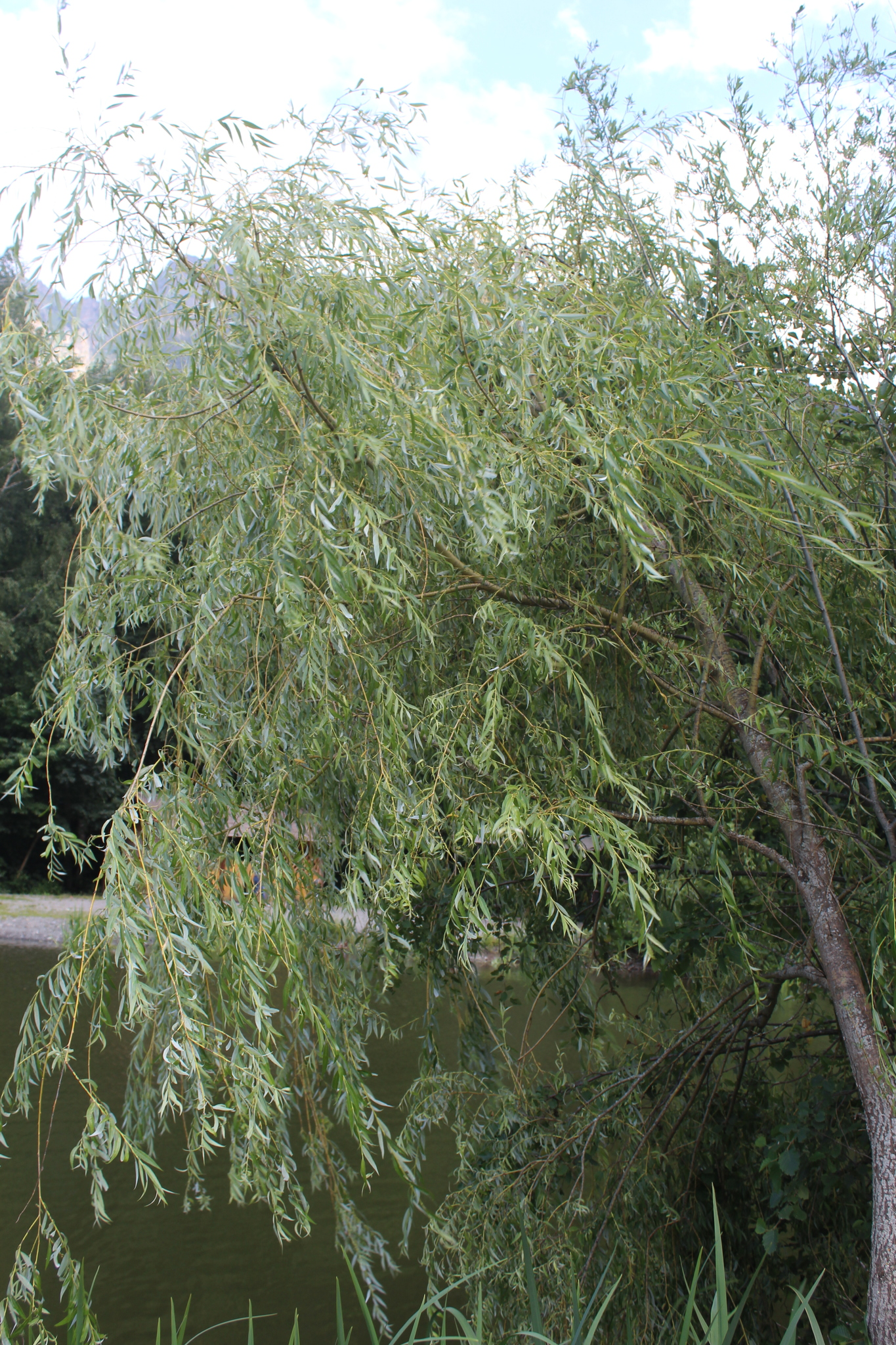
- Habit

Conservation status
- Least Concern (IUCN 3.1)

Scientific classification
- Kingdom: Plantae
- Clade: Tracheophytes
- Clade: Angiosperms
- Clade: Eudicots
- Clade: Rosids
- Order: Malpighiales
- Family: Salicaceae
- Genus: Salix
- Species: S. excelsa

Binomial name
- Salix excelsa S.G.Gmel.

Synonyms
- List: Salix dischgensis Goerz; Salix euapiculata Nasarow; Salix excelsa var. rodinii A.K.Skvortsov; Salix lispoclados Dode; Salix litwinowii Goerz ex Nasarow; Salix neodaviesii Bornm. ex Goerz; Salix oxica Dode; Salix variifolia Freyn & Sint.

= Salix excelsa =

Species of plant in the willow family

Salix excelsa is a species of flowering plant in the willow family Salicaceae. It is native to the Caucasus, Central Asia (except Kyrgyzstan), Iran, Afghanistan, and Pakistan, and has been introduced to the Levant, Yemen, the Himalayas, and India. It is closely related to Salix acmophylla. It is used as a street tree in Georgia and Iran.
