= Cameraria torridella =

Scientific classification
- Kingdom: Animalia
- Phylum: Arthropoda
- Class: Insecta
- Order: Lepidoptera
- Family: Gracillariidae
- Genus: Cameraria
- Species: C. torridella

Binomial name
- Cameraria torridella de Prins, 2012

Species of moth

Cameraria torridella is a moth of the family Gracillariidae. It is found in the Rift Valley in Kenya. The habitat consists of areas at altitudes between 2,200–2,500 metres (7,200–8,200 ft), where green vegetation is present for 10 months of the year.

The length of the forewings is 3–3.6 millimetres (0.12–0.14 in).

== Etymology ==
The specific name torridella refers to the host plant Dombeya torrida.
