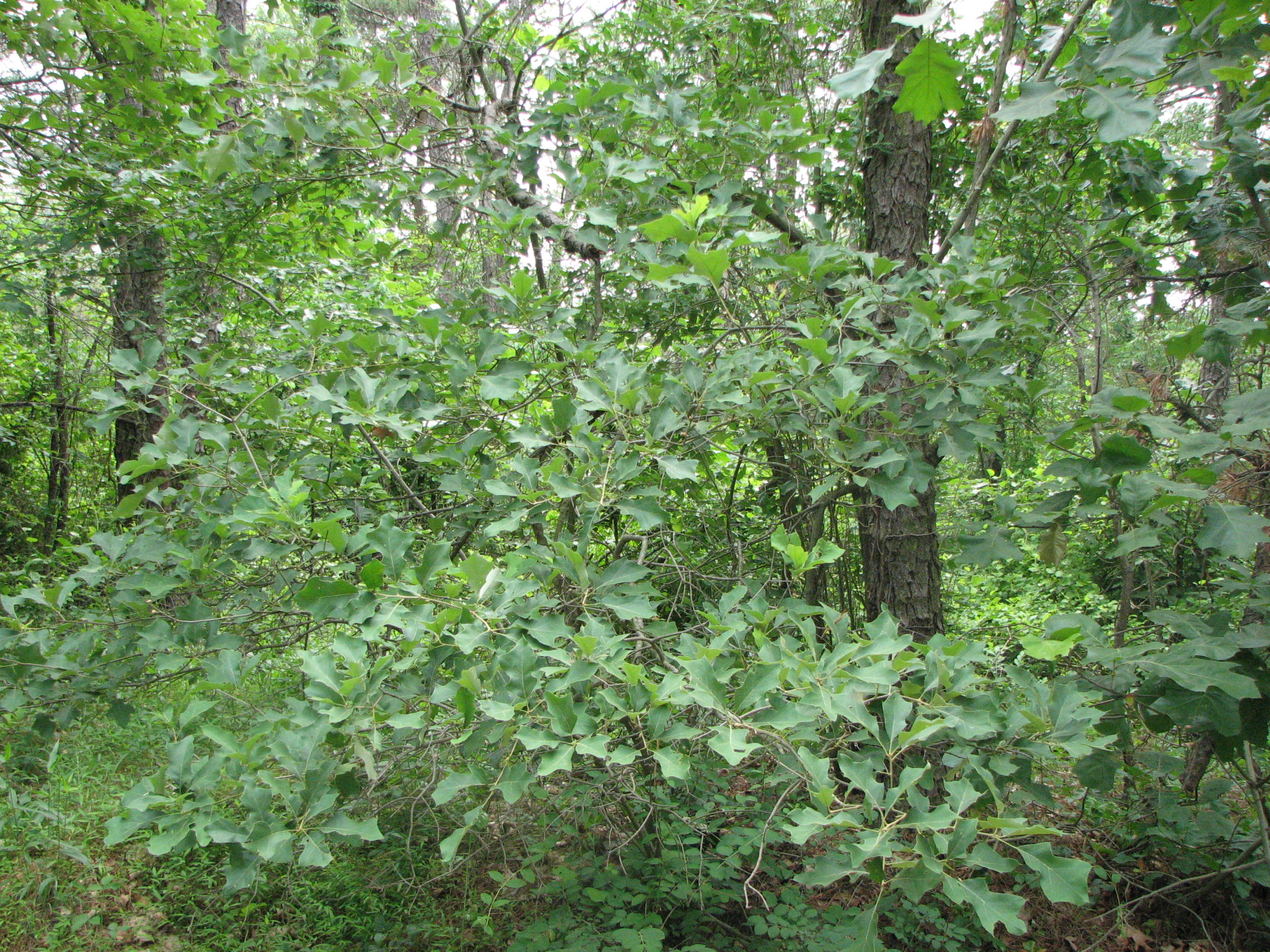
- Scrub oak in Nottingham, Pennsylvania, in June 2011

Conservation status
- Least Concern (IUCN 3.1)

Scientific classification
- Kingdom: Plantae
- Clade: Tracheophytes
- Clade: Angiosperms
- Clade: Eudicots
- Clade: Rosids
- Order: Fagales
- Family: Fagaceae
- Genus: Quercus
- Subgenus: Quercus subg. Quercus
- Section: Quercus sect. Lobatae
- Species: Q. ilicifolia

Binomial name
- Quercus ilicifolia Wangenh. 1787 not Salisb. 1864 nor Koord. & Valeton ex Seemen 1900
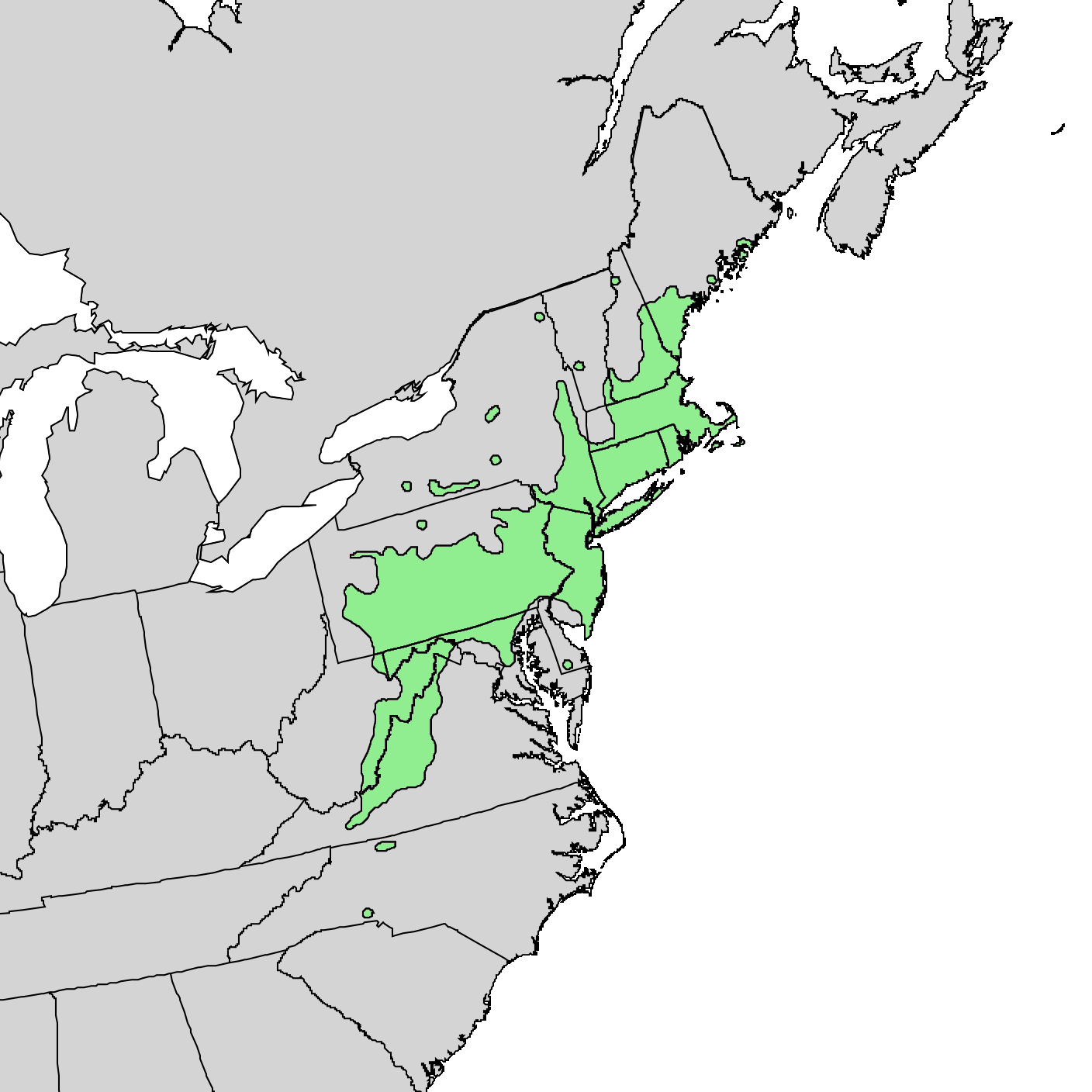
- The geographic presence of Quercus ilicifolia in the Northeastern United States (highlighted in green)

Synonyms
- List: Quercus banisteri Michx.; Quercus discolor var. banisteri (Michx.) Spach; Quercus ilicifolia var. georgiana A.Wood; Quercus nana (Marshall) Sarg. 1895 not Willd. 1805; Quercus nigra var. ilicifolia Kuntze; Quercus nigra var. pumila Marshall; Quercus pumila Sudw. 1898 not Walter 1788; Quercus rubra var. nana Marshall

= Quercus ilicifolia =

Species of oak tree

Quercus ilicifolia, commonly known as bear oak or scrub oak, is a small shrubby oak native to the Eastern United States and, less commonly, in southeastern Canada. Its range in the United States extends from Maine to North Carolina, with reports of a few populations north of the international frontier in Ontario. The name ilicifolia means "holly-leaved".

== Description ==
Quercus ilicifolia is a deciduous tree or shrub growing occasionally reaching a height of 6 meters (20 feet) but usually much smaller. It is gangly and can form a dense thicket. The plant grows from a large taproot, which reach 20 centimeters (8 inches) in thickness. The taproot lives a long time, producing several generations of above ground parts. The alternately arranged leaves are each up to 15 cm (6 in) in length by 10 cm (4 in) in width. The species is monoecious with plants bearing both male catkins and solitary or clustered female flowers. The egg-shaped acorn is 1 to 2 cm (1/2 to 3/4 in) long with a saucer-shaped cap. The plant reproduces sexually by seed and also vegetatively by sprouting new stems.

== Distribution and habitat ==
Quercus ilicifolia is a dominant plant species in a number of regions and habitat types. In Maine, it is found in deciduous forests alongside red maple (Acer rubrum), gray birch (Betula populifolia), and quaking aspen (Populus tremuloides). In Massachusetts, it codominates with black huckleberry (Gaylussacia baccata) on the shrublands of Nantucket and Martha's Vineyard. On Cape Cod, it occurs with pitch pine (Pinus rigida) and broom crowberry (Corema conradii). It is common in New Jersey's Pine Barrens and the pine barrens of Long Island. It also occurs in fire barrens on granite and gneiss further north in Canada. Quercus ilicifolia is also present in the Piedmont of North Carolina, where it is listed as a state endangered plant.

It is an oak that is adapted to disturbance in the habitat, such as wildfire and browsing. As a result, it does not tolerate shade and requires disturbance to remove other plant species so it can receive sunlight. It sprouts prolifically after fire burns away its above ground parts.

== Ecology ==
Quercus ilicifolia provides food and shelter for many animal species. Bears consume the bitter acorns, especially when preparing for hibernation. White-tailed deer eat the acorns and the stems and foliage. Many types of squirrels cache the acorns. Many birds depend on them; wild turkeys prefer them over other types of food. A large number of insect species live on the oak. This oak species is the primary or sole larval host for 29% of the rare or endangered Lepidopterans in southern New England and southeastern New York.

== Uses ==
Quercus ilicifolia has been used in revegetation projects on the Fresh Kills Landfill on Staten Island.
