= Paul Opler =

American entomologist (1938–2023)

Paul Alexander Opler (3 August 1938 – 6 February 2023) was an American entomologist and lepidopterist best known for his Peterson Field Guides to the butterflies of eastern and western North America, his pioneering role as the first entomologist in the U.S. Fish and Wildlife Service's Endangered Species Program, and his presidency of the Lepidopterists' Society. He was a Fellow of both the Entomological Society of America and the Royal Entomological Society.

== Early life and education ==
Opler was born on 3 August 1938 in Ann Arbor, Michigan, and grew up in California after his family moved west when he was six. By the age of nine he had developed a passion for butterflies and birds, and in 1952 — at fourteen — he joined the Lepidopterists' Society. He earned a B.S. in entomology from the University of California, Berkeley in 1960, was drafted into the United States Army in 1961 and assigned to study mosquitoes at the First U.S. Army Medical Laboratory in New York, then returned to academia for an M.A. from San Jose State University in 1965 and a Ph.D. in entomology from Berkeley in 1970.

== Career ==
After completing his doctorate, Opler spent four years in Costa Rica as a research associate with the Organization for Tropical Studies, studying Lepidoptera, plants, bees, and bats. He joined the U.S. Fish and Wildlife Service in 1974 as its first entomologist in the newly created Endangered Species Program, later serving as Chief of the Branch of Biological Support and then Chief-Editorial-Director at the USFWS Division of Research in Fort Collins, Colorado. He subsequently moved to the Biological Resources Division of the U.S. Geological Survey, and later held a special appointment professorship in the Department of Bioagricultural Sciences and Pest Management at Colorado State University, where he served as curator of the C. P. Gillette Museum of Arthropod Diversity.

He also held research associate positions at the Smithsonian Institution and the Denver Museum of Nature & Science.

== Research and writing ==
Opler's scientific work spanned insect–host relationships in Lepidoptera, tropical ecology, and butterfly conservation, and he published more than 100 scientific papers. His most widely used contributions were the field guides he authored for the Peterson Field Guides series: A Peterson Field Guide to Eastern Butterflies (with illustrator Vichai Malikul) and A Field Guide to Western Butterflies, which together cover virtually all butterfly species occurring in the United States and Canada. He also wrote Butterflies East of the Great Plains: An Illustrated Natural History (1984) and Moths of Western North America.

He served as the founding editor of American Entomologist, the flagship magazine of the Entomological Society of America, transforming it from its simpler predecessor, the Bulletin of the ESA. In 1989 he was elected president of the Lepidopterists' Society.

In later years, Opler taught natural history of butterflies courses at Rocky Mountain National Park, the Teton Science School, and the Sierra Nevada Field Campus of San Francisco State University, and collaborated with Nick Grishin of the University of Texas at Dallas on DNA-based lepidopteran studies.

== Death ==
Opler died of cancer on 6 February 2023 in Loveland, Colorado, at the age of 84. He was survived by his wife Evi Buckner-Opler, three children, and three grandchildren.

== Selected works ==
- Butterflies East of the Great Plains: An Illustrated Natural History (Johns Hopkins University Press, 1984)
- A Peterson Field Guide to Eastern Butterflies (with Vichai Malikul; Houghton Mifflin, 1992; revised 1998)
- A Field Guide to Western Butterflies (Peterson Field Guides; Houghton Mifflin, 1999)
- Moths of Western North America (University of California Press, 2009)
