= A. sacchari =

A. sacchari may refer to:

- Abacarus sacchari, a species of mite
- Aceria sacchari, a species of mite in the genus Aceria
- Acrolophus sacchari , a species of moth
- Alicyclobacillus sacchari, a Gram-positive bacterium
- Aspergillus sacchari, a species of mold in the genus Aspergillus
