= Acrolophus garleppi =

Scientific classification
- Domain: Eukaryota
- Kingdom: Animalia
- Phylum: Arthropoda
- Class: Insecta
- Order: Lepidoptera
- Family: Tineidae
- Genus: Acrolophus
- Species: A. garleppi

Binomial name
- Acrolophus garleppi (Druce, 1901)

Synonyms
- Felderia garleppi Druce, 1901

Species of moth

Acrolophus garleppi is a moth of the family Acrolophidae. It is found in Bolivia.
