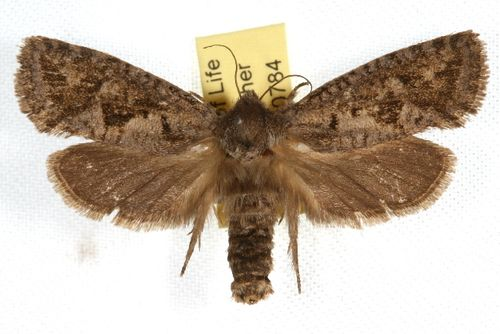

Scientific classification
- Kingdom: Animalia
- Phylum: Arthropoda
- Clade: Pancrustacea
- Class: Insecta
- Order: Lepidoptera
- Family: Tineidae
- Genus: Acrolophus
- Species: A. arizonellus

Binomial name
- Acrolophus arizonellus Walsingham, 1887

= Acrolophus arizonellus =

Species of moth

Acrolophus arizonellus is a moth of the family Acrolophidae. It is found in North America, including Arizona and Texas.
