= Acrolophus acanthogona =

Scientific classification
- Kingdom: Animalia
- Phylum: Arthropoda
- Class: Insecta
- Order: Lepidoptera
- Family: Tineidae
- Genus: Acrolophus
- Species: A. acanthogona

Binomial name
- Acrolophus acanthogona Meyrick, 1919

Synonyms
- Acrolophus acanthogonus

Species of moth

Acrolophus acanthogona is a moth of the family Acrolophidae. It is found in Texas.
