= Acrolophus praetusalis =

Scientific classification
- Kingdom: Animalia
- Phylum: Arthropoda
- Class: Insecta
- Order: Lepidoptera
- Family: Tineidae
- Genus: Acrolophus
- Species: A. praetusalis

Binomial name
- Acrolophus praetusalis (Walker, 1858)

Synonyms
- Palthis praetusalis Walker, 1858; Acrolophus cathecta Walsingham, 1915

Species of moth

Acrolophus praetusalis is a moth of the family Acrolophidae. It is found in South America and Honduras.
