= Acrolophus melanodoxa =

Scientific classification
- Kingdom: Animalia
- Phylum: Arthropoda
- Class: Insecta
- Order: Lepidoptera
- Family: Tineidae
- Genus: Acrolophus
- Species: A. melanodoxa

Binomial name
- Acrolophus melanodoxa (Meyrick, 1919)

Synonyms
- Psephocrita melanodoxa Meyrick, 1919

Species of moth

Acrolophus melanodoxa is a moth of the family Acrolophidae. It is found in French Guiana.
