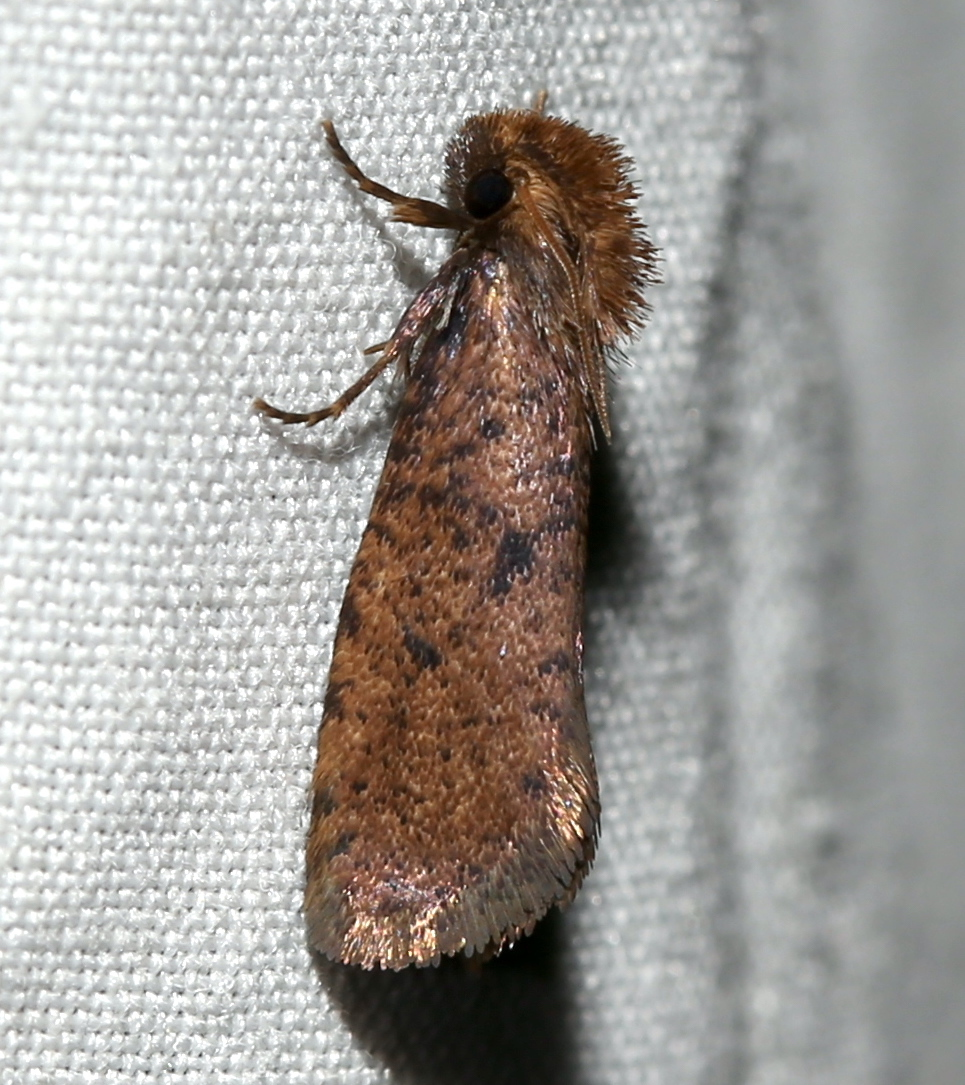

Scientific classification
- Kingdom: Animalia
- Phylum: Arthropoda
- Class: Insecta
- Order: Lepidoptera
- Family: Tineidae
- Genus: Acrolophus
- Species: A. propinqua

Binomial name
- Acrolophus propinqua (Walsingham, 1887)

Synonyms
- Anaphora propinqua Walsingham, 1887; Acrolophus propinquus; Anaphora tenuis Walsingham, 1887; Acrolophus violaceellus Beutenmüller, 1887; Anaphora busckella Haimbach, 1915

= Acrolophus propinqua =

Walsingham's grass tubeworm moth

Species of moth

Acrolophus propinqua (Walsingham's grass tubeworm moth) is a moth of the family Acrolophidae. It is found in North America, including Alabama, Florida, Georgia, Illinois, Louisiana, Maryland, Mississippi, North Carolina, New York, Ohio, South Carolina, Tennessee, Virginia and West Virginia.

The wingspan is 22–26 mm.
