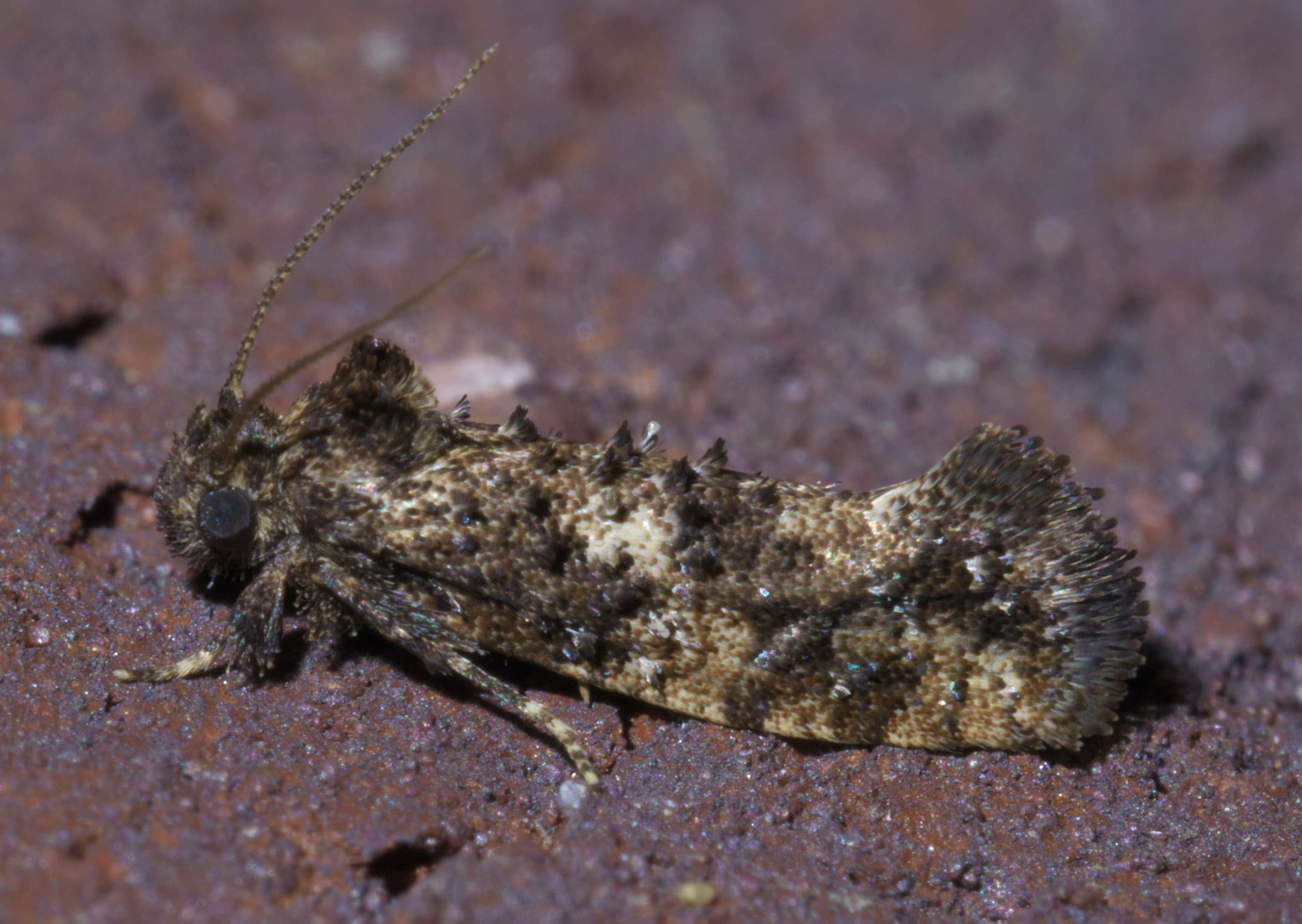
- Acrolophus cressoni, Cresson's grass tubeworm, size: 8.2 mm

Scientific classification
- Domain: Eukaryota
- Kingdom: Animalia
- Phylum: Arthropoda
- Class: Insecta
- Order: Lepidoptera
- Family: Tineidae
- Genus: Acrolophus
- Species: A. cressoni

Binomial name
- Acrolophus cressoni (Walsingham, 1882)

Synonyms
- Eulepiste cressoni Walsingham, 1882

= Acrolophus cressoni =

Cresson's grass tubeworm moth

Species of moth

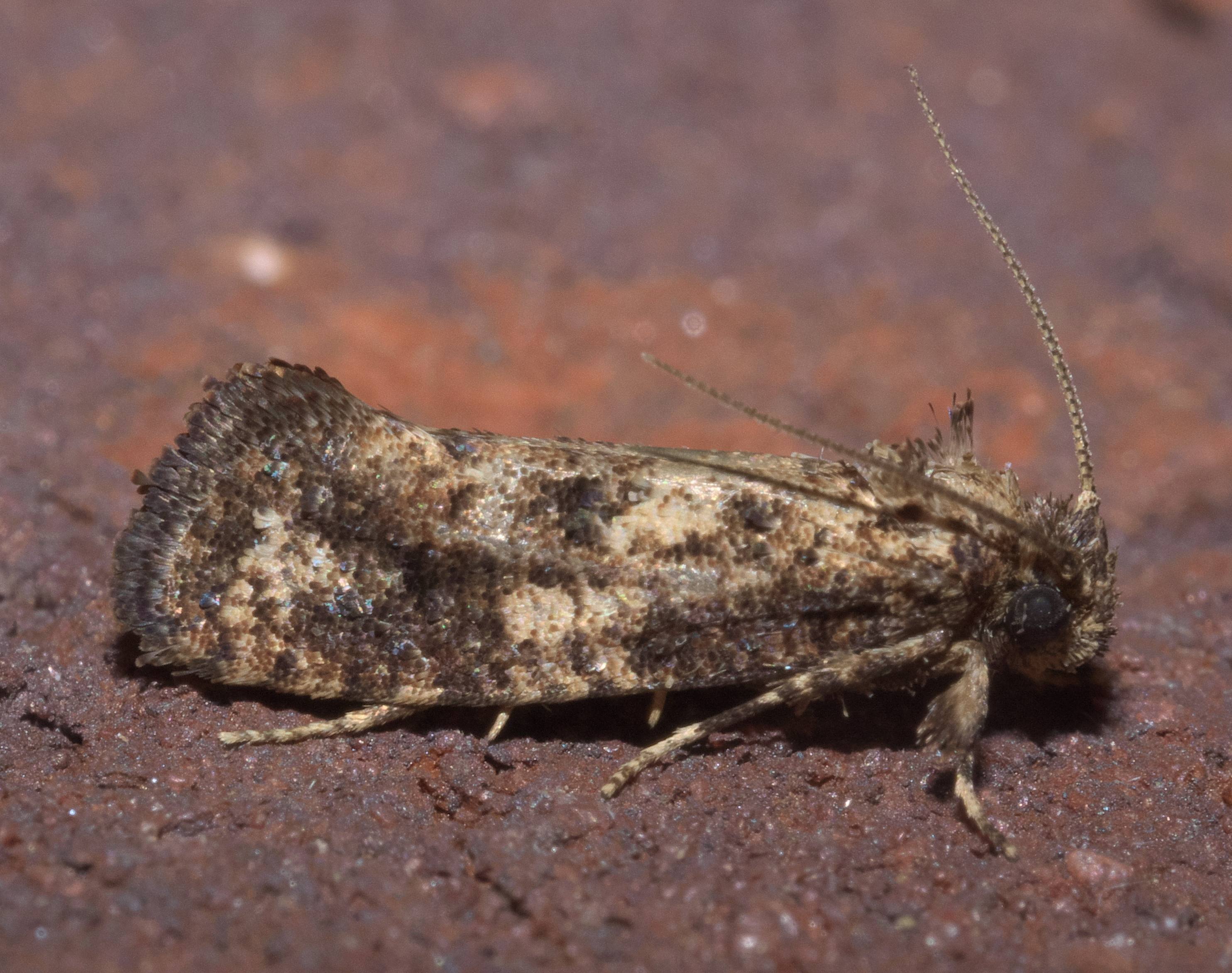
Acrolophus cressoni, Cresson's grass tubeworm, size: 8.8 mm

Acrolophus cressoni (Cresson's grass tubeworm moth) is a moth of the family Acrolophidae. It is found in North America, including Alabama, Arizona, Arkansas, Florida, Georgia, Kentucky, Louisiana, Mississippi, New Mexico, North Carolina, Oklahoma, Tennessee and Texas.

The wingspan is about 19 mm.
