= Acrolophus pusilla =

Scientific classification
- Kingdom: Animalia
- Phylum: Arthropoda
- Clade: Pancrustacea
- Class: Insecta
- Order: Lepidoptera
- Family: Tineidae
- Genus: Acrolophus
- Species: A. pusilla

Binomial name
- Acrolophus pusilla (Zeller, 1877)

Synonyms
- Anaphora pusilla Zeller, 1877; Caenogenes pusilla

Species of moth

Acrolophus pusilla is a moth of the family Acrolophidae. It is found in Colombia.
