= Acrolophus penumbra =

Scientific classification
- Domain: Eukaryota
- Kingdom: Animalia
- Phylum: Arthropoda
- Class: Insecta
- Order: Lepidoptera
- Family: Tineidae
- Genus: Acrolophus
- Species: A. penumbra

Binomial name
- Acrolophus penumbra Walsingham, 1914

Species of moth

Acrolophus penumbra is a moth of the family Acrolophidae. It is found in South America.
