= Acrolophus ductifera =

Scientific classification
- Kingdom: Animalia
- Phylum: Arthropoda
- Class: Insecta
- Order: Lepidoptera
- Family: Tineidae
- Genus: Acrolophus
- Species: A. ductifera

Binomial name
- Acrolophus ductifera Meyrick, 1927

Species of moth

Acrolophus ductifera is a moth of the family Acrolophidae. It is exclusively found in Antigua.
