= Acrolophus tricausta =

Scientific classification
- Kingdom: Animalia
- Phylum: Arthropoda
- Class: Insecta
- Order: Lepidoptera
- Family: Tineidae
- Genus: Acrolophus
- Species: A. tricausta

Binomial name
- Acrolophus tricausta Meyrick, 1887

Species of moth

Acrolophus tricausta is a moth of the family Acrolophidae. It is found in South America.
