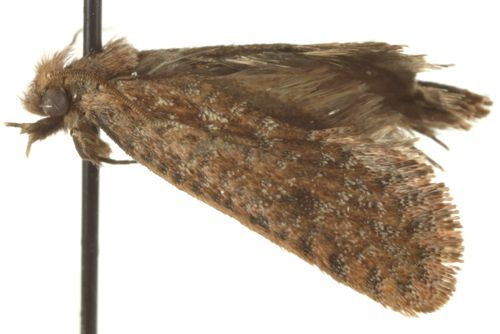

Scientific classification
- Kingdom: Animalia
- Phylum: Arthropoda
- Clade: Pancrustacea
- Class: Insecta
- Order: Lepidoptera
- Family: Tineidae
- Genus: Acrolophus
- Species: A. pyramellus

Binomial name
- Acrolophus pyramellus (Barnes & McDunnough, 1913)

Synonyms
- Eulepiste pyramellus Barnes & McDunnough, 1913

= Acrolophus pyramellus =

Species of moth

Acrolophus pyramellus is a moth of the family Acrolophidae. It was described by William Barnes and James Halliday McDunnough in 1913. It is found in North America, including Arizona, California and Nevada.
