= Acrolophus pallidus =

Scientific classification
- Kingdom: Animalia
- Phylum: Arthropoda
- Class: Insecta
- Order: Lepidoptera
- Family: Tineidae
- Genus: Acrolophus
- Species: A. pallidus

Binomial name
- Acrolophus pallidus Möschler, 1881

Species of moth

Acrolophus pallidus is a moth of the family Acrolophidae. It is found in Suriname and in French Guiana.
