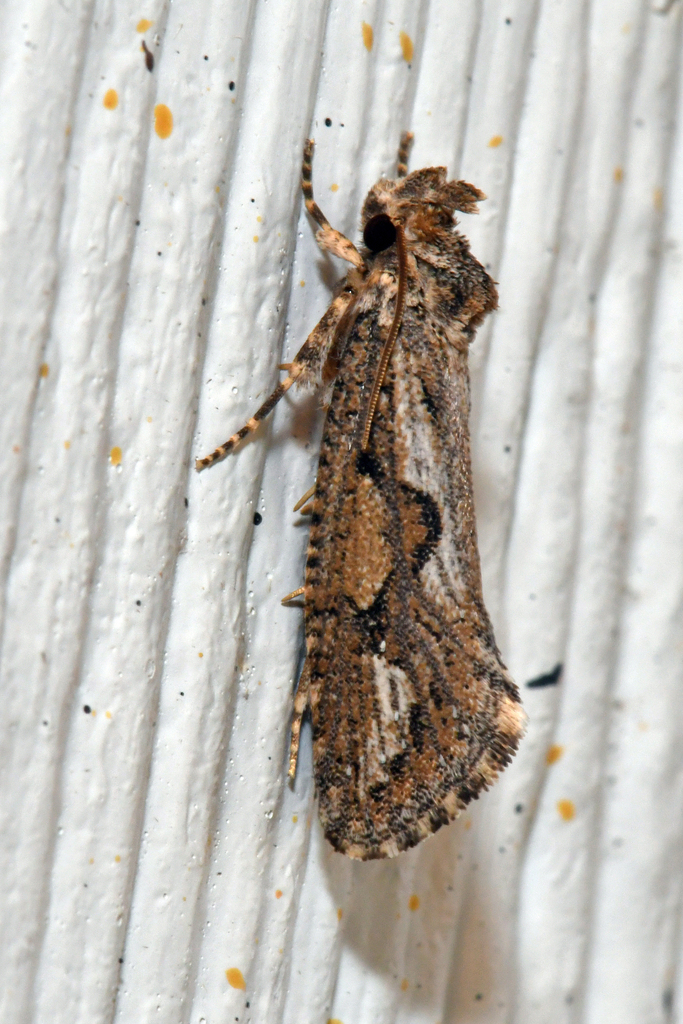

Scientific classification
- Kingdom: Animalia
- Phylum: Arthropoda
- Clade: Pancrustacea
- Class: Insecta
- Order: Lepidoptera
- Family: Tineidae
- Genus: Acrolophus
- Species: A. variabilis

Binomial name
- Acrolophus variabilis (Walsingham, 1887)

Synonyms
- Ortholophus variabilis Walsingham, 1887

= Acrolophus variabilis =

Species of moth

Acrolophus variabilis is a moth of the family Acrolophidae. It was described by Walsingham in 1887. It is found in North America, including Arizona, California, Nevada, New Mexico, Oklahoma and Oregon.

The wingspan is 25–29 mm.
