= Acrolophus harparsen =

Scientific classification
- Kingdom: Animalia
- Phylum: Arthropoda
- Clade: Pancrustacea
- Class: Insecta
- Order: Lepidoptera
- Family: Tineidae
- Genus: Acrolophus
- Species: A. harparsen

Binomial name
- Acrolophus harparsen Forbes, 1931

Species of moth

Acrolophus harparsen is a moth of the family Acrolophidae. It is found in Puerto Rico.
