= Acrolophus bombaulia =

Scientific classification
- Kingdom: Animalia
- Phylum: Arthropoda
- Class: Insecta
- Order: Lepidoptera
- Family: Tineidae
- Genus: Acrolophus
- Species: A. bombaulia

Binomial name
- Acrolophus bombaulia Meyrick, 1922

Species of moth

Acrolophus bombaulia is a moth of the family Acrolophidae. It is found in Argentina.
