= Acrolophus hirsutus =

Scientific classification
- Domain: Eukaryota
- Kingdom: Animalia
- Phylum: Arthropoda
- Class: Insecta
- Order: Lepidoptera
- Family: Tineidae
- Genus: Acrolophus
- Species: A. hirsutus

Binomial name
- Acrolophus hirsutus (Walsingham, 1887)

Synonyms
- Tysanoscelis hirsutus Walsingham, 1887

Species of moth

Acrolophus hirsutus is a moth of the family Acrolophidae. It is found in Brazil.
