= Acrolophus laetifica =

Scientific classification
- Domain: Eukaryota
- Kingdom: Animalia
- Phylum: Arthropoda
- Class: Insecta
- Order: Lepidoptera
- Family: Tineidae
- Genus: Acrolophus
- Species: A. laetifica

Binomial name
- Acrolophus laetifica Durrant, 1915

Species of moth

Acrolophus laetifica is a moth of the family Acrolophidae. It is found in South America.
