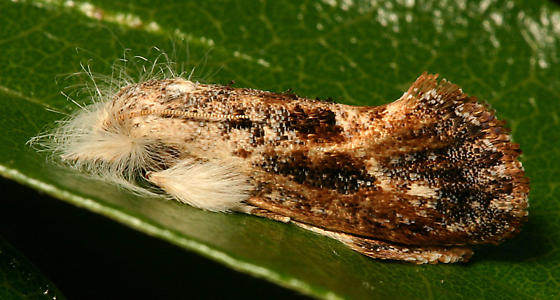
- Unidentified Acrolophus species

Scientific classification
- Kingdom: Animalia
- Phylum: Arthropoda
- Class: Insecta
- Order: Lepidoptera
- Family: Tineidae
- Subfamily: Acrolophinae
- Genus: Acrolophus; Poey, 1832

Synonyms
- List: Anaphora Clemens, 1859; Anaphorina Strand, 1932; Ankistrophorus Walsingham, 1887; Apoclisis Walsingham, 1914; Atopocera Walsingham, 1897; Bazira Walker, 1864; Brachysymbola Meyrick, 1912; Caenogenes Walsingham, 1887; Daulia Walker, 1863; Derchis Walker, 1863; Eddara Walker, 1863; Eddarula Strand, 1932; Eulepiste Walsingham, 1882; Eutheca Grote, 1881; Felderia Walsingham, 1887; Hibita Walker, 1863; Homonymus Walsingham, 1887; Hypoclopus Walsingham, 1887; Neolophus Walsingham, 1887; Orothyntis Meyrick, 1913; Ortholophus Walsingham, 1887; Phlongia Walker, 1864; Pilanaphora Walsingham, 1897; Psephocrita Meyrick, 1919; Pseudanaphora Walsingham, 1887; Pseudoconchylis Walsingham, 1884; Sapinella Kirby, 1892; Tachasara Walker, 1866; Thysanoscelis Walsingham, 1887; Thysanoskelis Walsingham, 1887; Tirasia Walker, 1863; Urbara Walker, 1864; Xerocausta Meyrick, 1929

= Acrolophus =

Genus of moths

Acrolophus is a genus of moths in the family Acrolophidae, with, typically, great individual variation within species in color pattern, making field identification of many individuals difficult or impossible. It was described by Felipe Poey in 1832.

== Species ==
- Acrolophus abdita
- Acrolophus acanthogona
- Acrolophus acornus
- Acrolophus albipennis
- Acrolophus anaphorella
- Acrolophus anathyrsa
- Acrolophus angulatella
- Acrolophus apertella
- Acrolophus arcanella
- Acrolophus arcasalis
- Acrolophus arcturella
- Acrolophus argentinus
- Acrolophus arida
- Acrolophus arimusalis
- Acrolophus arizonellus
- Acrolophus australis
- Acrolophus bactra
- Acrolophus baldufi
- Acrolophus barbipalpis
- Acrolophus barema
- Acrolophus baryspila
- Acrolophus basistriatus
- Acrolophus bicornutus
- Acrolophus bidens
- Acrolophus bifurcata
- Acrolophus bogotensis
- Acrolophus bombaulia
- Acrolophus boucardi
- Acrolophus bugabae
- Acrolophus capex
- Acrolophus catagnampta
- Acrolophus ceramochra
- Acrolophus cervicolor
- Acrolophus chiricahuae
- Acrolophus chloropelta
- Acrolophus chonactis
- Acrolophus cleptica
- Acrolophus cockerelli
- Acrolophus condita
- Acrolophus contubernalis
- Acrolophus corrientis
- Acrolophus corticinocolor
- Acrolophus corvula
- Acrolophus corymba
- Acrolophus cosmeta
- Acrolophus cossoides
- Acrolophus crescentella
- Acrolophus cressoni – Cresson's grass tubeworm moth
- Acrolophus crinifrons
- Acrolophus cyclophora
- Acrolophus damina
- Acrolophus davisellus
- Acrolophus diachelota
- Acrolophus dictyopsamma
- Acrolophus dimidiella
- Acrolophus directus
- Acrolophus doeri
- Acrolophus dorsimacula
- Acrolophus ductifera
- Acrolophus echinon
- Acrolophus echinura
- Acrolophus ectenes
- Acrolophus empedocles
- Acrolophus emphytopa
- Acrolophus erethismia
- Acrolophus euporia
- Acrolophus euteles
- Acrolophus exaphrista
- Acrolophus exigua
- Acrolophus farracea
- Acrolophus ferrarenella
- Acrolophus ferruginea
- Acrolophus fervidus
- Acrolophus filicornis
- Acrolophus forbesi
- Acrolophus fumida
- Acrolophus furcatus
- Acrolophus fuscisignatus
- Acrolophus galeata
- Acrolophus garleppi
- Acrolophus gigantea
- Acrolophus goniocentra
- Acrolophus granulatella
- Acrolophus griseus
- Acrolophus guttatus
- Acrolophus halidora
- Acrolophus hamiferella
- Acrolophus harmoniella
- Acrolophus harparsen
- Acrolophus hedemanni
- Acrolophus heppneri
- Acrolophus hirsutivestita
- Acrolophus hirsutus
- Acrolophus horridalis
- Acrolophus hypophaea
- Acrolophus icarus
- Acrolophus illudens
- Acrolophus infida
- Acrolophus invida
- Acrolophus irrisoria
- Acrolophus jalapae
- Acrolophus juxtatus
- Acrolophus kearfotti
- Acrolophus klotsi
- Acrolophus laetifica
- Acrolophus latiberbis
- Acrolophus laticapitana
- Acrolophus lerodes
- Acrolophus leucodocis
- Acrolophus leucopogon
- Acrolophus leucotricha
- Acrolophus libitina
- Acrolophus lithopa
- Acrolophus luriei
- Acrolophus macrogaster
- Acrolophus macrophallus
- Acrolophus macrozancla
- Acrolophus maculata
- Acrolophus maculifer
- Acrolophus maculisecta
- Acrolophus manticodes
- Acrolophus marcida
- Acrolophus melanodoxa
- Acrolophus merocoma
- Acrolophus micromacha
- Acrolophus mimasalis
- Acrolophus minima
- Acrolophus minor
- Acrolophus misema
- Acrolophus modestas
- Acrolophus monoctenis
- Acrolophus mora
- Acrolophus morbidula
- Acrolophus mortipennella
- Acrolophus mycetophagus – frilly grass tubeworm moth
- Acrolophus niveipunctata
- Acrolophus noctivaga
- Acrolophus noctuina
- Acrolophus nubifer
- Acrolophus numidia
- Acrolophus occultum
- Acrolophus ochracea
- Acrolophus ornata
- Acrolophus pachynta
- Acrolophus pallidus Möschler, 1890 (from Suriname, French Guyana)
- Acrolophus panamae – Panama grass tubeworm moth
- Acrolophus pannephela
- Acrolophus particeps
- Acrolophus parvipalpus
- Acrolophus parvus
- Acrolophus pauper
- Acrolophus penumbra
- Acrolophus perpetua
- Acrolophus perrensella
- Acrolophus perrensi
- Acrolophus persimplex
- Acrolophus phaeomalla
- Acrolophus pholeter
- Acrolophus piger – piger grass tubeworm moth
- Acrolophus pinnifera
- Acrolophus plumifrontella – eastern grass tubeworm moth
- Acrolophus poeyi
- Acrolophus popeanella – Clemens' grass tubeworm moth
- Acrolophus practica
- Acrolophus praetusalis
- Acrolophus prepodes
- Acrolophus pristinella
- Acrolophus propinqua – Walsingham's grass tubeworm moth
- Acrolophus psammophila
- Acrolophus pseudohirsutus
- Acrolophus psoloessa
- Acrolophus pumicea
- Acrolophus punctata
- Acrolophus punctellus
- Acrolophus pusilla
- Acrolophus pygmaea
- Acrolophus pyramellus
- Acrolophus quadrellus
- Acrolophus rastricornis
- Acrolophus ridicula
- Acrolophus rupestris
- Acrolophus sacchari
- Acrolophus sagaritis
- Acrolophus salvini
- Acrolophus sarista
- Acrolophus satyrisca
- Acrolophus schistodes
- Acrolophus scopodes
- Acrolophus scotera
- Acrolophus scotina
- Acrolophus scrupulata
- Acrolophus seculatus
- Acrolophus seminigera
- Acrolophus sepulcralis
- Acrolophus serratus
- Acrolophus setiacma
- Acrolophus signatus
- Acrolophus simulatus
- Acrolophus sinclairi
- Acrolophus spathista
- Acrolophus spilotus
- Acrolophus spinifera
- Acrolophus subfusca
- Acrolophus superstes
- Acrolophus synapta
- Acrolophus tapuja
- Acrolophus tetrancyla
- Acrolophus texanella – Texas grass tubeworm moth
- Acrolophus thaminodes
- Acrolophus tholomicta
- Acrolophus torta
- Acrolophus tretus
- Acrolophus tricausta
- Acrolophus trichosoma
- Acrolophus umbratipalpis
- Acrolophus uncigera
- Acrolophus uncispinis
- Acrolophus urcei
- Acrolophus vanduzeei
- Acrolophus variabilis
- Acrolophus vauriei
- Acrolophus vespertilio
- Acrolophus vigia
- Acrolophus vitellus
- Acrolophus walsinghami Möschler, 1890 (Puerto Rico, Florida)
- Acrolophus whitelyi
- Acrolophus xylinella
- Acrolophus zanclophora
