= Acrolophus ferrarenella =

Scientific classification
- Kingdom: Animalia
- Phylum: Arthropoda
- Class: Insecta
- Order: Lepidoptera
- Family: Tineidae
- Genus: Acrolophus
- Species: A. ferrarenella

Binomial name
- Acrolophus ferrarenella (Walker, 1864)

Synonyms
- Phlongia ferrarenella Walker, 1864

Species of moth

Acrolophus ferrarenella is a moth of the family Acrolophidae. It is found in South America.
