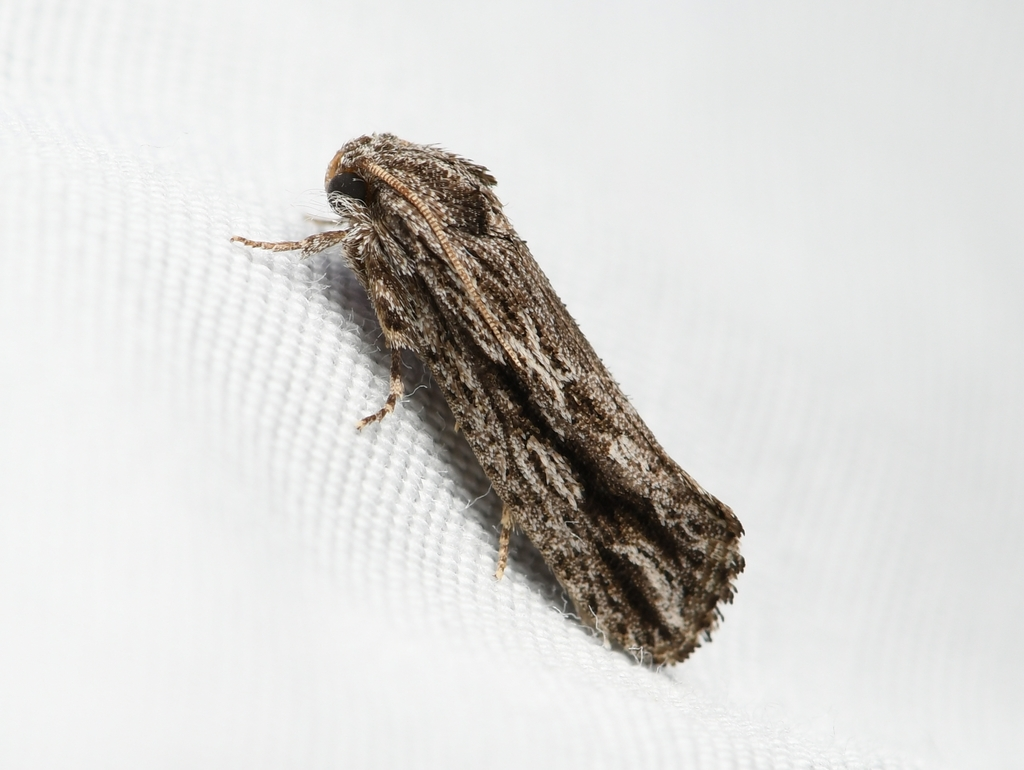

Scientific classification
- Kingdom: Animalia
- Phylum: Arthropoda
- Clade: Pancrustacea
- Class: Insecta
- Order: Lepidoptera
- Family: Tineidae
- Genus: Acrolophus
- Species: A. furcatus

Binomial name
- Acrolophus furcatus (Walsingham, 1887)

Synonyms
- Neolophus furcatus Walsingham, 1887

= Acrolophus furcatus =

Species of moth

Acrolophus furcatus is a moth of the family Acrolophidae. It was described by Walsingham in 1887. It is found in North America, including Arizona, California and Texas.
