= Acrolophus abdita =

Scientific classification
- Domain: Eukaryota
- Kingdom: Animalia
- Phylum: Arthropoda
- Class: Insecta
- Order: Lepidoptera
- Family: Tineidae
- Genus: Acrolophus
- Species: A. abdita

Binomial name
- Acrolophus abdita Walsingham, 1914

Species of moth

Acrolophus abdita is a moth of the family Acrolophidae. It is found in South America.
