= Acrolophus sepulcralis =

Scientific classification
- Kingdom: Animalia
- Phylum: Arthropoda
- Class: Insecta
- Order: Lepidoptera
- Family: Tineidae
- Genus: Acrolophus
- Species: A. sepulcralis

Binomial name
- Acrolophus sepulcralis (Meyrick, 1912)

Synonyms
- Brachysymbola sepulcralis Meyrick, 1912

Species of moth

Acrolophus sepulcralis is a moth of the family Acrolophidae. It is found in Argentina.
