= Acrolophus macrozancla =

Scientific classification
- Kingdom: Animalia
- Phylum: Arthropoda
- Class: Insecta
- Order: Lepidoptera
- Family: Tineidae
- Genus: Acrolophus
- Species: A. macrozancla

Binomial name
- Acrolophus macrozancla Meyrick, 1922

Species of moth

Acrolophus macrozancla is a moth of the family Acrolophidae. It is found in Peru.
