= Acrolophus subfusca =

Scientific classification
- Kingdom: Animalia
- Phylum: Arthropoda
- Class: Insecta
- Order: Lepidoptera
- Family: Tineidae
- Genus: Acrolophus
- Species: A. subfusca

Binomial name
- Acrolophus subfusca Meyrick, 1913

Species of moth

Acrolophus subfusca is a moth of the family Acrolophidae. It is found in South America. It was first described by Edward Meyrick in 1913.
