= Acrolophus fervidus =

Scientific classification
- Domain: Eukaryota
- Kingdom: Animalia
- Phylum: Arthropoda
- Class: Insecta
- Order: Lepidoptera
- Family: Tineidae
- Genus: Acrolophus
- Species: A. fervidus

Binomial name
- Acrolophus fervidus Busck, 1912

Synonyms
- Neolophus antonellus Barnes & McDunnough, 1913; Acrolophus fervida Busck, 1913

Species of moth

Acrolophus fervidus is a moth of the family Acrolophidae described by August Busck in 1912. It is found in Costa Rica, Mexico and Texas.
