= Acrolophus corymba =

Scientific classification
- Domain: Eukaryota
- Kingdom: Animalia
- Phylum: Arthropoda
- Class: Insecta
- Order: Lepidoptera
- Family: Tineidae
- Genus: Acrolophus
- Species: A. corymba

Binomial name
- Acrolophus corymba Durrant, 1914

Species of moth

Acrolophus corymba is a moth of the family Acrolophidae. It is found in South America.
