= Acrolophus parvus =

Scientific classification
- Domain: Eukaryota
- Kingdom: Animalia
- Phylum: Arthropoda
- Class: Insecta
- Order: Lepidoptera
- Family: Tineidae
- Genus: Acrolophus
- Species: A. parvus

Binomial name
- Acrolophus parvus (Walsingham, 1892)

Synonyms
- Hypoclopus parvus Walsingham, 1892

Species of moth

Acrolophus parvus is a moth of the family Acrolophidae. It is found in the West Indies.
