= Acrolophus directus =

Scientific classification
- Domain: Eukaryota
- Kingdom: Animalia
- Phylum: Arthropoda
- Class: Insecta
- Order: Lepidoptera
- Family: Tineidae
- Genus: Acrolophus
- Species: A. directus

Binomial name
- Acrolophus directus Busck, 1912

Species of moth

Acrolophus directus is a moth of the family Acrolophidae. It is found in Mexico.
