= Acrolophus ochracea =

Scientific classification
- Domain: Eukaryota
- Kingdom: Animalia
- Phylum: Arthropoda
- Class: Insecta
- Order: Lepidoptera
- Family: Tineidae
- Genus: Acrolophus
- Species: A. ochracea

Binomial name
- Acrolophus ochracea (Möschler, 1890)

Synonyms
- Caenogenes ochracea Möschler, 1890

Species of moth

Acrolophus ochracea is a moth of the family Acrolophidae. It is found in the West Indies.
