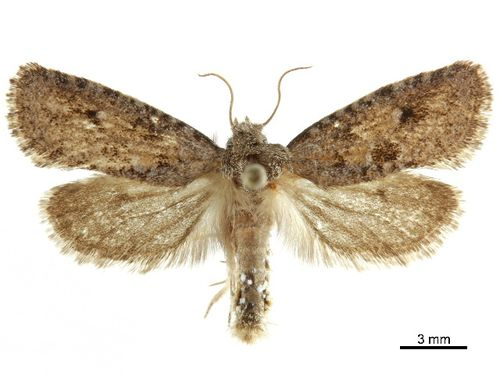

Scientific classification
- Kingdom: Animalia
- Phylum: Arthropoda
- Clade: Pancrustacea
- Class: Insecta
- Order: Lepidoptera
- Family: Tineidae
- Genus: Acrolophus
- Species: A. parvipalpus

Binomial name
- Acrolophus parvipalpus Hasbrouck, 1964

= Acrolophus parvipalpus =

Species of moth

Acrolophus parvipalpus is a moth of the family Acrolophidae. It was described by Hasbrouck in 1964. It is found in North America, including Arizona and Texas.
