= Acrolophus tholomicta =

Scientific classification
- Kingdom: Animalia
- Phylum: Arthropoda
- Class: Insecta
- Order: Lepidoptera
- Family: Tineidae
- Genus: Acrolophus
- Species: A. tholomicta

Binomial name
- Acrolophus tholomicta Meyrick, 1929

Species of moth

Acrolophus tholomicta is a moth of the family Acrolophidae. It is found in Colombia.
