= Acrolophus hamiferella =

Scientific classification
- Kingdom: Animalia
- Phylum: Arthropoda
- Clade: Pancrustacea
- Class: Insecta
- Order: Lepidoptera
- Family: Tineidae
- Genus: Acrolophus
- Species: A. hamiferella

Binomial name
- Acrolophus hamiferella (Hübner, 1827)

Synonyms
- Pinaris hamiferella Hübner, 1827

Species of moth

Acrolophus hamiferella is a moth of the family Acrolophidae. It is found in South America.
