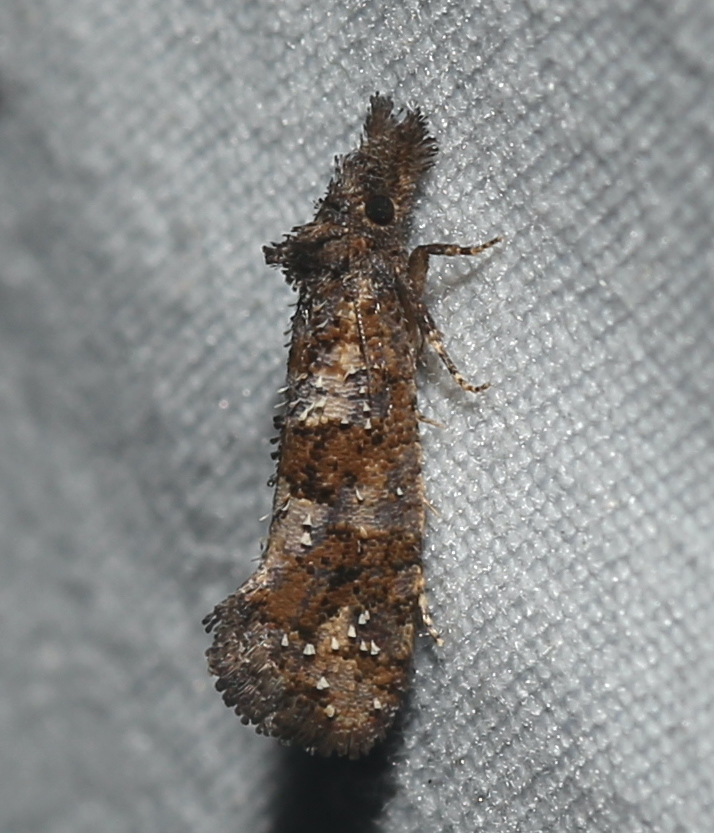

Scientific classification
- Kingdom: Animalia
- Phylum: Arthropoda
- Class: Insecta
- Order: Lepidoptera
- Family: Tineidae
- Genus: Acrolophus
- Species: A. simulatus

Binomial name
- Acrolophus simulatus Walsingham, 1882

= Acrolophus simulatus =

Species of moth

Acrolophus simulatus is a species of moth in the family Acrolophidae. It was first described by Walsingham in 1882. The species is found in North America, including Florida and Texas.
