= Acrolophus corticinocolor =

Scientific classification
- Domain: Eukaryota
- Kingdom: Animalia
- Phylum: Arthropoda
- Class: Insecta
- Order: Lepidoptera
- Family: Tineidae
- Genus: Acrolophus
- Species: A. corticinocolor

Binomial name
- Acrolophus corticinocolor Strand, 1920

Species of moth

Acrolophus corticinocolor is a moth of the family Acrolophidae. It is found in Costa Rica.
