= Acrolophus noctuina =

Scientific classification
- Domain: Eukaryota
- Kingdom: Animalia
- Phylum: Arthropoda
- Class: Insecta
- Order: Lepidoptera
- Family: Tineidae
- Genus: Acrolophus
- Species: A. noctuina

Binomial name
- Acrolophus noctuina (Walsingham, 1891)

Synonyms
- Anaphora noctuina Walsingham, 1891

Species of moth

Acrolophus noctuina is a moth of the family Acrolophidae. It is found in the West Indies.
