= Acrolophus niveipunctata =

Scientific classification
- Domain: Eukaryota
- Kingdom: Animalia
- Phylum: Arthropoda
- Class: Insecta
- Order: Lepidoptera
- Family: Tineidae
- Genus: Acrolophus
- Species: A. niveipunctata

Binomial name
- Acrolophus niveipunctata Walsingham, 1891

Species of moth

Acrolophus niveipunctata is a moth of the family Acrolophidae. It is found on Cuba.
