= Acrolophus scotina =

Scientific classification
- Domain: Eukaryota
- Kingdom: Animalia
- Phylum: Arthropoda
- Class: Insecta
- Order: Lepidoptera
- Family: Tineidae
- Genus: Acrolophus
- Species: A. scotina

Binomial name
- Acrolophus scotina (Walsingham, 1914)

Synonyms
- Amydria scotina Walsingham, 1914

Species of moth

Acrolophus scotina is a moth of the family, Acrolophidae. It is found in Mexico.
