= Acrolophus noctivaga =

Scientific classification
- Domain: Eukaryota
- Kingdom: Animalia
- Phylum: Arthropoda
- Class: Insecta
- Order: Lepidoptera
- Family: Tineidae
- Genus: Acrolophus
- Species: A. noctivaga

Binomial name
- Acrolophus noctivaga (Walsingham, 1897)

Synonyms
- Pseudanaphora noctivaga Walsingham, 1897

Species of moth

Acrolophus noctivaga is a moth of the family Acrolophidae. It is found in the West Indies.
