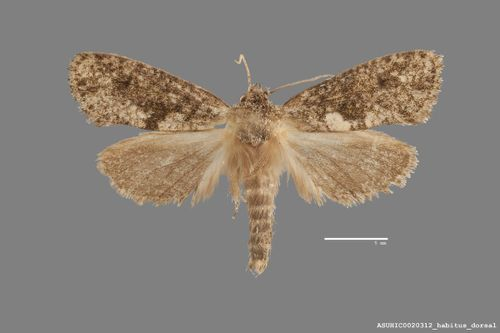

Scientific classification
- Kingdom: Animalia
- Phylum: Arthropoda
- Clade: Pancrustacea
- Class: Insecta
- Order: Lepidoptera
- Family: Tineidae
- Genus: Acrolophus
- Species: A. persimplex

Binomial name
- Acrolophus persimplex (Dyar, 1900)

Synonyms
- Neolophus persimplex Dyar, 1900

= Acrolophus persimplex =

Species of moth

Acrolophus persimplex is a moth of the family Acrolophidae. It was described by Harrison Gray Dyar Jr. in 1900. It is found in North America, including Arizona and Florida.
