= Acrolophus phaeomalla =

Scientific classification
- Domain: Eukaryota
- Kingdom: Animalia
- Phylum: Arthropoda
- Class: Insecta
- Order: Lepidoptera
- Family: Tineidae
- Genus: Acrolophus
- Species: A. phaeomalla

Binomial name
- Acrolophus phaeomalla Meyrick, 1913

Species of moth

Acrolophus phaeomalla is a moth of the family Acrolophidae. It is found in Argentina.
