= Acrolophus emphytopa =

Scientific classification
- Kingdom: Animalia
- Phylum: Arthropoda
- Class: Insecta
- Order: Lepidoptera
- Family: Tineidae
- Genus: Acrolophus
- Species: A. emphytopa

Binomial name
- Acrolophus emphytopa Meyrick, 1932

Species of moth

Acrolophus emphytopa is a moth of the family Acrolophidae. It is found in Brazil.
