= Acrolophus erethismia =

Scientific classification
- Kingdom: Animalia
- Phylum: Arthropoda
- Class: Insecta
- Order: Lepidoptera
- Family: Tineidae
- Genus: Acrolophus
- Species: A. erethismia

Binomial name
- Acrolophus erethismia Meyrick, 1930

Species of moth

Acrolophus erethismia is a moth of the family Acrolophidae. It is found in Brazil.
