= Acrolophus umbratipalpis =

Scientific classification
- Domain: Eukaryota
- Kingdom: Animalia
- Phylum: Arthropoda
- Class: Insecta
- Order: Lepidoptera
- Family: Tineidae
- Genus: Acrolophus
- Species: A. umbratipalpis

Binomial name
- Acrolophus umbratipalpis (Walsingham, 1891)

Synonyms
- Eulepiste umbratipalpis Walsingham, 1891

Species of moth

Acrolophus umbratipalpis is a moth of the family Acrolophidae. It is found in the West Indies.
