= Acrolophus xylinella =

Scientific classification
- Kingdom: Animalia
- Phylum: Arthropoda
- Class: Insecta
- Order: Lepidoptera
- Family: Tineidae
- Genus: Acrolophus
- Species: A. xylinella

Binomial name
- Acrolophus xylinella (Walker, 1863)

Synonyms
- Eddara xylinella Walker, 1863; Bazira xylinella

Species of moth

Acrolophus xylinella is a moth of the family Acrolophidae. It is found in the West Indies.
