= Acrolophus torta =

Scientific classification
- Kingdom: Animalia
- Phylum: Arthropoda
- Class: Insecta
- Order: Lepidoptera
- Family: Tineidae
- Genus: Acrolophus
- Species: A. torta

Binomial name
- Acrolophus torta (Meyrick, 1922)

Synonyms
- Orothyntis torta Meyrick, 1922

Species of moth

Acrolophus torta is a moth of the family Acrolophidae. It is found in Peru.
