= Acrolophus pristinella =

Scientific classification
- Kingdom: Animalia
- Phylum: Arthropoda
- Class: Insecta
- Order: Lepidoptera
- Family: Tineidae
- Genus: Acrolophus
- Species: A. pristinella

Binomial name
- Acrolophus pristinella (Walker, 1863)

Synonyms
- Tinea pristinella Walker, 1863

Species of moth

Acrolophus pristinella is a moth of the family Acrolophidae. It is found in Venezuela.
