= Acrolophus arcturella =

Scientific classification
- Kingdom: Animalia
- Phylum: Arthropoda
- Class: Insecta
- Order: Lepidoptera
- Family: Tineidae
- Genus: Acrolophus
- Species: A. arcturella

Binomial name
- Acrolophus arcturella (Walker, 1863)

Synonyms
- Hibita arcturella Walker, 1863

Species of moth

Acrolophus arcturella is a moth of the family Acrolophidae. It is found in South America.
