= Acrolophus satyrisca =

Scientific classification
- Kingdom: Animalia
- Phylum: Arthropoda
- Class: Insecta
- Order: Lepidoptera
- Family: Tineidae
- Genus: Acrolophus
- Species: A. satyrisca

Binomial name
- Acrolophus satyrisca Meyrick, 1927

Species of moth

Acrolophus satyrisca is a moth of the family Acrolophidae. It is found in Colombia.
