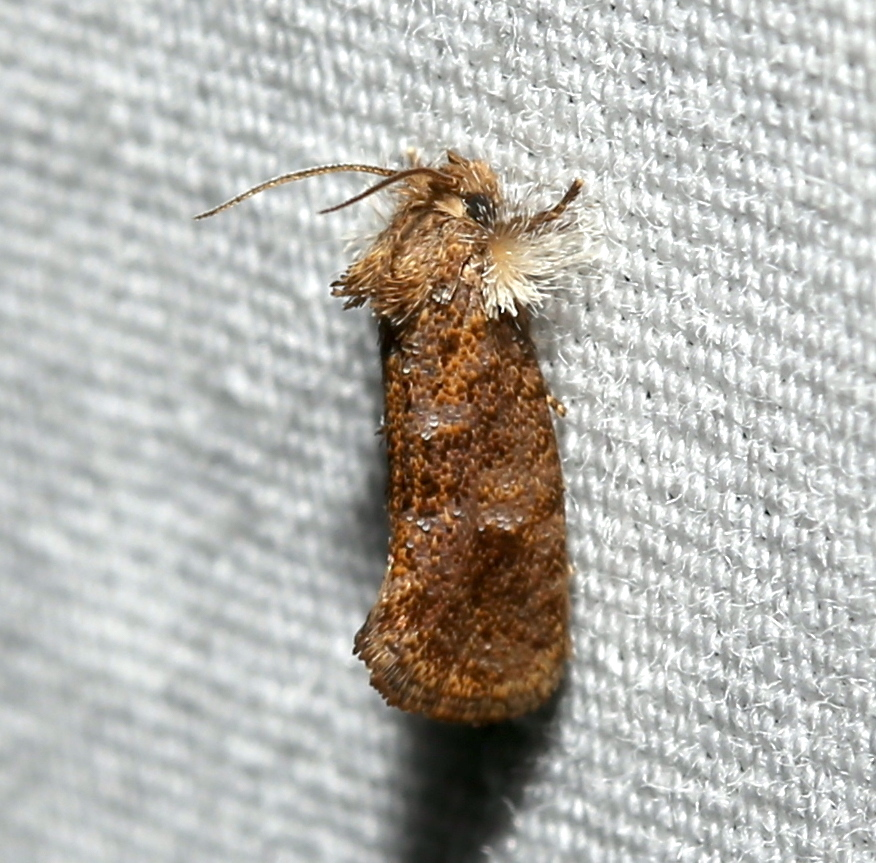

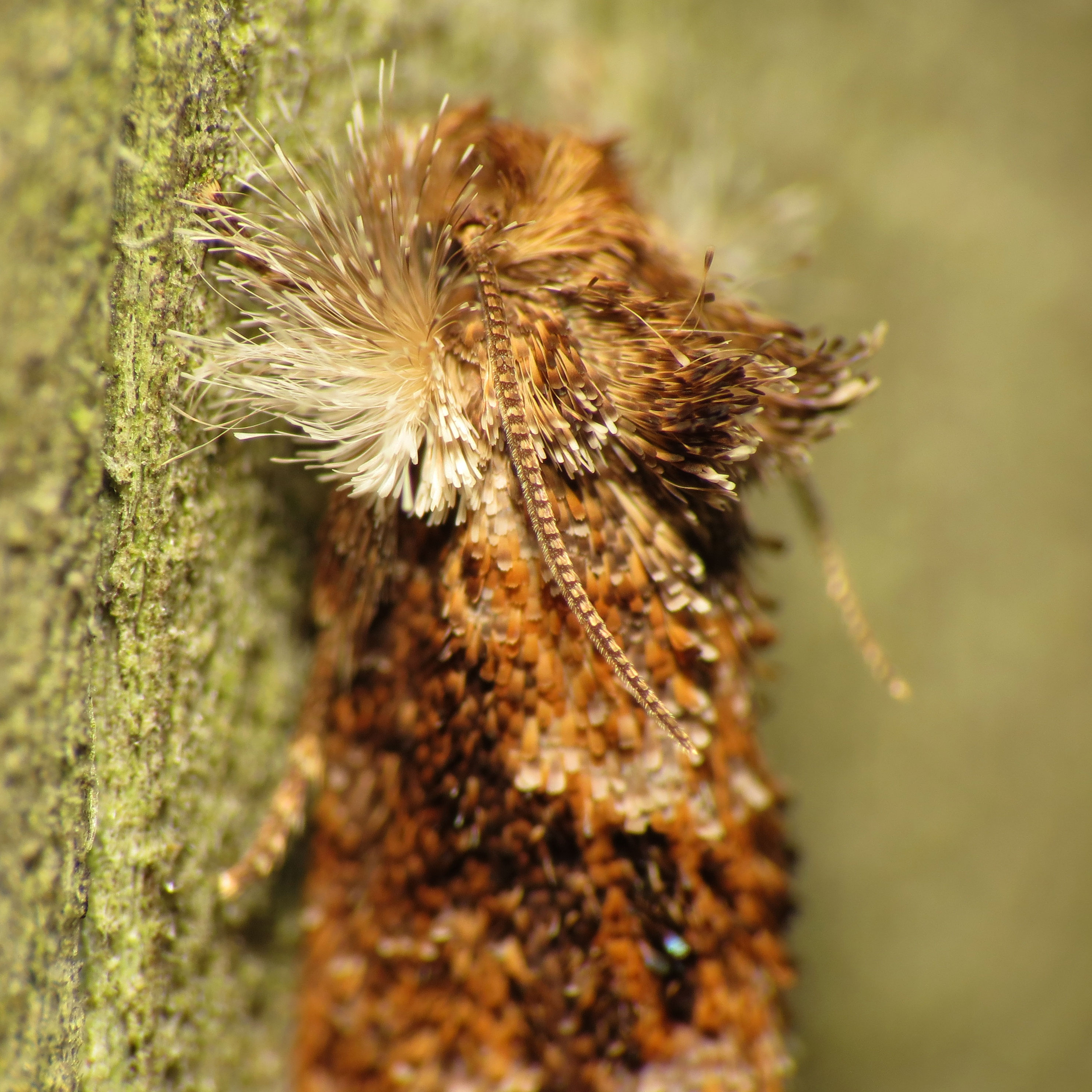

Scientific classification
- Kingdom: Animalia
- Phylum: Arthropoda
- Class: Insecta
- Order: Lepidoptera
- Family: Tineidae
- Genus: Acrolophus
- Species: A. panamae

Binomial name
- Acrolophus panamae Busck, 1914

= Acrolophus panamae =

Panama grass tubeworm moth

Species of moth

Acrolophus panamae, the Panama grass tubeworm moth, is a moth of the family Acrolophidae. It was described by August Busck in 1914. It is found in North America, including Alabama, Delaware, Florida, Georgia, Maryland, Mississippi, New Jersey, North Carolina, South Carolina and Virginia.

The wingspan is about 15 mm. Adults have been recorded on wing from June to July.
