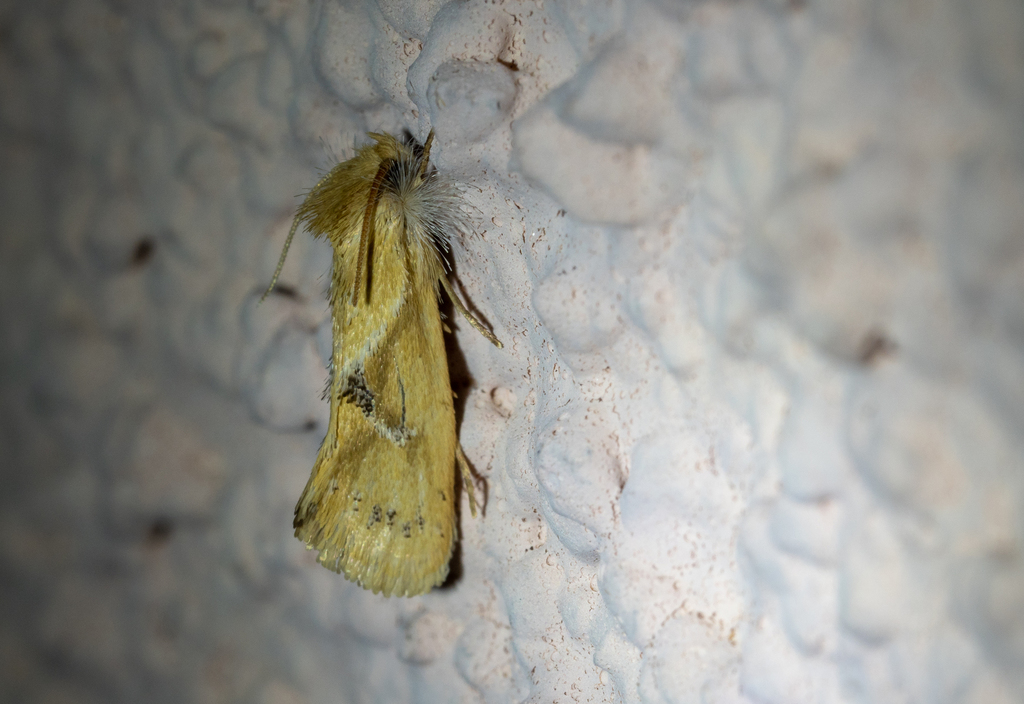

Scientific classification
- Kingdom: Animalia
- Phylum: Arthropoda
- Clade: Pancrustacea
- Class: Insecta
- Order: Lepidoptera
- Family: Tineidae
- Genus: Acrolophus
- Species: A. laticapitana

Binomial name
- Acrolophus laticapitana (Walsingham, 1884)

Synonyms
- Pseudoconchylis laticapitana Walsingham, 1884; Acrolophus laticapitanus; Phalonia unistrigana Dyar 1903; Acrolophus leopardus Busck 1910; Acrolophus occidens Busck 1910; Acrolophus flavicomus Busck 1912; Acrolophus clarkei Hasbrouck 1964; Acrolophus heinrichi Hasbrouck 1964

= Acrolophus laticapitana =

Species of moth

Acrolophus laticapitana is a moth of the family Acrolophidae. It was described by Walsingham in 1884. It is found in North America, northern California to southern Arizona.

The length of the forewings 6.5–9.5 mm.

== Subspecies ==
- Acrolophus laticapitana laticapitana
- Acrolophus laticapitana unistriganus Dyar, 1903
