= Acrolophus ornata =

Scientific classification
- Domain: Eukaryota
- Kingdom: Animalia
- Phylum: Arthropoda
- Class: Insecta
- Order: Lepidoptera
- Family: Tineidae
- Genus: Acrolophus
- Species: A. ornata

Binomial name
- Acrolophus ornata (Walsingham, 1887)

Synonyms
- Anaphora ornata Walsingham, 1887

Species of moth

Acrolophus ornata is a moth of the family Acrolophidae and is found in Colombia.
