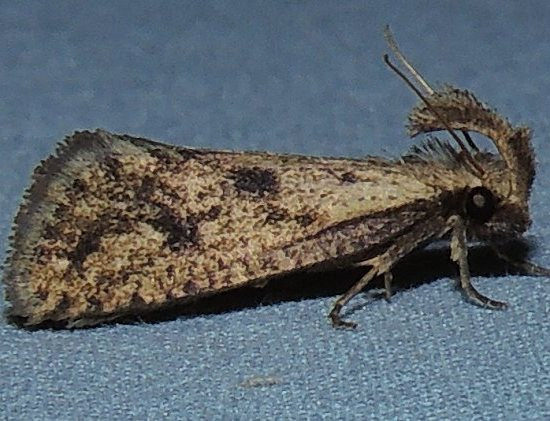

Scientific classification
- Kingdom: Animalia
- Phylum: Arthropoda
- Class: Insecta
- Order: Lepidoptera
- Family: Tineidae
- Genus: Acrolophus
- Species: A. mortipennella

Binomial name
- Acrolophus mortipennella (Grote, 1872)

Synonyms
- Anaphora mortipennella Grote, 1872; Hypoclopus quadripunctellus Dyar 1900; Acrolophus carphologa Meyrick 1919; Acrolophus zeela Hasbrouck 1964; Acrolophus mortipennellus Grote, 1872

= Acrolophus mortipennella =

Species of moth

Acrolophus mortipennella is a moth of the family Acrolophidae. It was described by Augustus Radcliffe Grote in 1872. It is found in North America, including Alabama, Florida, Illinois, Kentucky, Louisiana, Mississippi, Ohio, South Carolina and Texas.

The wingspan is 23–30 mm.
