= Acrolophus perrensella =

Scientific classification
- Domain: Eukaryota
- Kingdom: Animalia
- Phylum: Arthropoda
- Class: Insecta
- Order: Lepidoptera
- Family: Tineidae
- Genus: Acrolophus
- Species: A. perrensella

Binomial name
- Acrolophus perrensella (Walsingham, 1887)

Synonyms
- Caenogenes perrensella Walsingham, 1887

Species of moth

Acrolophus perrensella is a moth of the family Acrolophidae. It is found in Argentina.
