= Acrolophus numidia =

Scientific classification
- Domain: Eukaryota
- Kingdom: Animalia
- Phylum: Arthropoda
- Class: Insecta
- Order: Lepidoptera
- Family: Tineidae
- Genus: Acrolophus
- Species: A. numidia

Binomial name
- Acrolophus numidia (H. Druce, 1901)

Synonyms
- Anaphora numidia H. Druce, 1901; Anaphora orizaba Dyar, 1901; Acrolophus orizaba

Species of moth

Acrolophus numidia is a moth of the family Acrolophidae first described by Herbert Druce in 1901. It is found in Mexico.
