= Acrolophus dimidiella =

Scientific classification
- Domain: Eukaryota
- Kingdom: Animalia
- Phylum: Arthropoda
- Class: Insecta
- Order: Lepidoptera
- Family: Tineidae
- Genus: Acrolophus
- Species: A. dimidiella

Binomial name
- Acrolophus dimidiella (Walsingham, 1892)

Synonyms
- Felderia dimidiella Walsingham, 1892

Species of moth

Acrolophus dimidiella is a moth of the family Acrolophidae. It is found in the West Indies.
