= Acrolophus manticodes =

Scientific classification
- Kingdom: Animalia
- Phylum: Arthropoda
- Class: Insecta
- Order: Lepidoptera
- Family: Tineidae
- Genus: Acrolophus
- Species: A. manticodes

Binomial name
- Acrolophus manticodes Meyrick, 1919

Species of moth

Acrolophus manticodes is a moth of the family Acrolophidae. It is found in South America.
