= Acrolophus irrisoria =

Scientific classification
- Kingdom: Animalia
- Phylum: Arthropoda
- Class: Insecta
- Order: Lepidoptera
- Family: Tineidae
- Genus: Acrolophus
- Species: A. irrisoria

Binomial name
- Acrolophus irrisoria Meyrick, 1924

Species of moth

Acrolophus irrisoria is a moth of the family Acrolophidae. It is found on Jamaica.
