= Acrolophus psammophila =

Scientific classification
- Domain: Eukaryota
- Kingdom: Animalia
- Phylum: Arthropoda
- Class: Insecta
- Order: Lepidoptera
- Family: Tineidae
- Genus: Acrolophus
- Species: A. psammophila

Binomial name
- Acrolophus psammophila Meyrick, 1931

Species of moth

Acrolophus psammophila is a moth of the family Acrolophidae. It is found in Brazil.
