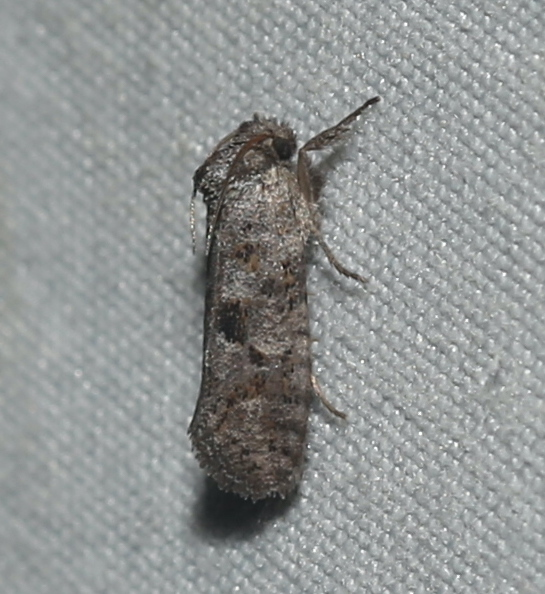

Scientific classification
- Kingdom: Animalia
- Phylum: Arthropoda
- Class: Insecta
- Order: Lepidoptera
- Family: Tineidae
- Genus: Acrolophus
- Species: A. forbesi

Binomial name
- Acrolophus forbesi Hasbrouck, 1964

= Acrolophus forbesi =

Species of moth

Acrolophus forbesi is a moth of the family Acrolophidae. It was described by Hasbrouck in 1964. It is found in North America, including Alabama, Florida, Georgia, Louisiana, Mississippi, South Carolina and Texas.

The wingspan is about 17 mm.
