= Acrolophus horridalis =

Scientific classification
- Kingdom: Animalia
- Phylum: Arthropoda
- Class: Insecta
- Order: Lepidoptera
- Family: Tineidae
- Genus: Acrolophus
- Species: A. horridalis

Binomial name
- Acrolophus horridalis (Walker, 1863)

Synonyms
- Derchis horridalis Walker, 1863

Species of moth

Acrolophus horridalis is a moth of the family Acrolophidae. It is found in Brazil.
