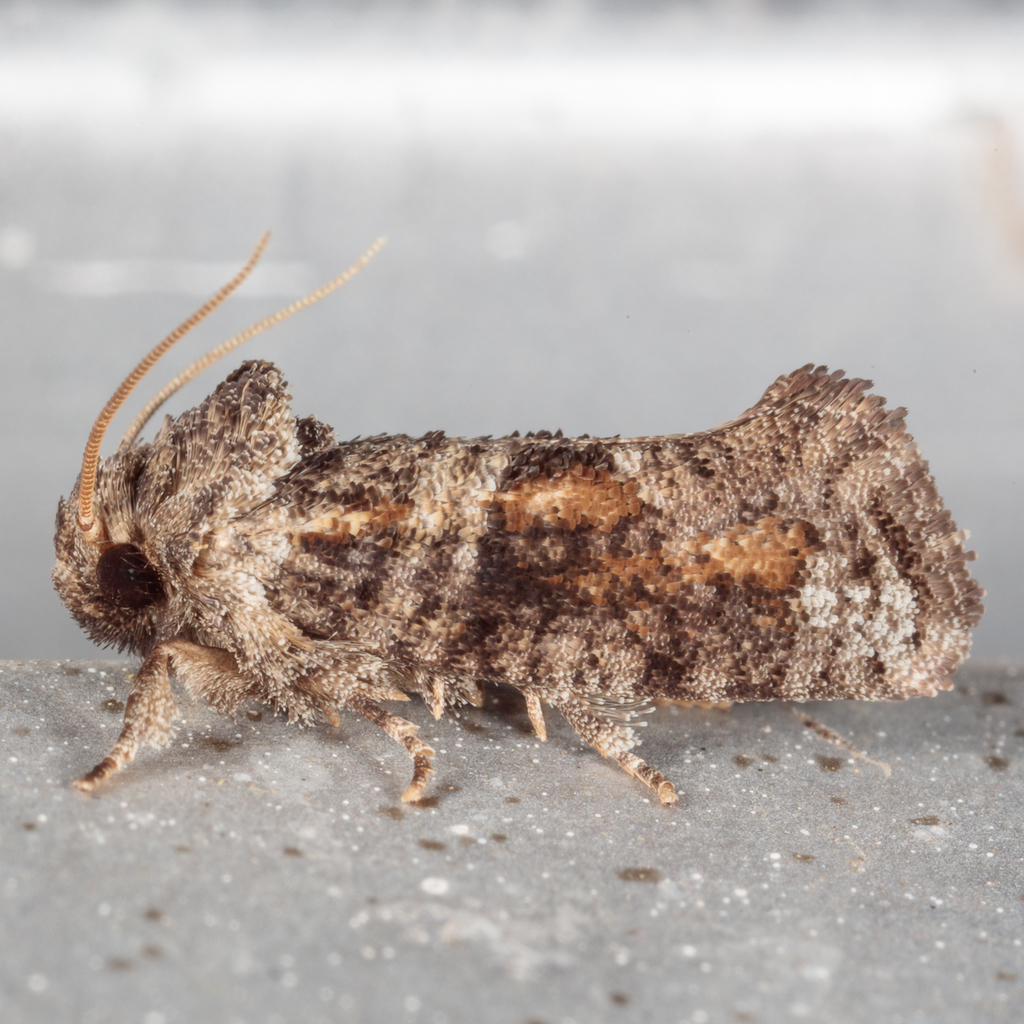

Scientific classification
- Kingdom: Animalia
- Phylum: Arthropoda
- Clade: Pancrustacea
- Class: Insecta
- Order: Lepidoptera
- Family: Tineidae
- Genus: Acrolophus
- Species: A. piger

Binomial name
- Acrolophus piger (Dyar, 1900)

Synonyms
- Ortholophus piger Dyar, 1900

= Acrolophus piger =

Piger grass tubeworm moth

Species of moth

Acrolophus piger, the piger grass tubeworm moth, is a moth of the family Acrolophidae. It was described by Harrison Gray Dyar Jr. in 1900. It is found in North America, including Alabama, Florida, Mississippi, North Carolina, South Carolina and Texas.

The wingspan is about 16 mm.
