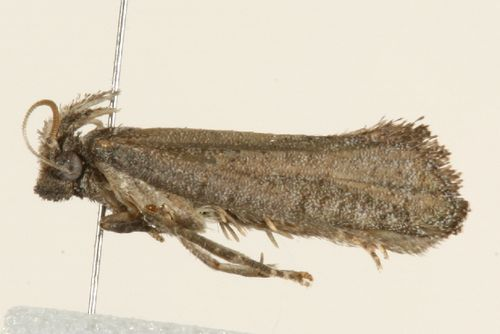

Scientific classification
- Kingdom: Animalia
- Phylum: Arthropoda
- Clade: Pancrustacea
- Class: Insecta
- Order: Lepidoptera
- Family: Tineidae
- Genus: Acrolophus
- Species: A. bicornutus

Binomial name
- Acrolophus bicornutus Hasbrouck, 1964

= Acrolophus bicornutus =

Species of moth

Acrolophus bicornutus is a moth of the family Acrolophidae. It is found in Florida.

The wingspan is about 13 mm.
