= Acrolophus uncispinis =

Scientific classification
- Domain: Eukaryota
- Kingdom: Animalia
- Phylum: Arthropoda
- Class: Insecta
- Order: Lepidoptera
- Family: Tineidae
- Genus: Acrolophus
- Species: A. uncispinis

Binomial name
- Acrolophus uncispinis Walsingham, 1915

Species of moth

Acrolophus uncispinis is a moth of the family Acrolophidae. It was described by Lord Walsingham in 1915.
