= Acrolophus sarista =

Scientific classification
- Domain: Eukaryota
- Kingdom: Animalia
- Phylum: Arthropoda
- Class: Insecta
- Order: Lepidoptera
- Family: Tineidae
- Genus: Acrolophus
- Species: A. sarista

Binomial name
- Acrolophus sarista Meyrick, 1913

Species of moth

Acrolophus sarista is a moth of the family Acrolophidae. It is found in Venezuela.
