= Acrolophus apertella =

Scientific classification
- Kingdom: Animalia
- Phylum: Arthropoda
- Clade: Pancrustacea
- Class: Insecta
- Order: Lepidoptera
- Family: Tineidae
- Genus: Acrolophus
- Species: A. apertella

Binomial name
- Acrolophus apertella Busck, 1914

Species of moth

Acrolophus apertella is a moth of the family Acrolophidae. It is found in Mexico.Acrolophus apertella belongs to the genus Acrolophus, and the family Acrolophidae.
