= Acrolophus rastricornis =

Scientific classification
- Kingdom: Animalia
- Phylum: Arthropoda
- Class: Insecta
- Order: Lepidoptera
- Family: Tineidae
- Genus: Acrolophus
- Species: A. rastricornis

Binomial name
- Acrolophus rastricornis Meyrick, 1932

Species of moth

Acrolophus rastricornis is a moth of the family Acrolophidae. It is found on the Virgin Islands.
