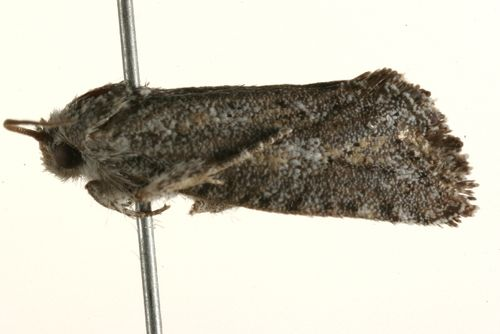

Scientific classification
- Kingdom: Animalia
- Phylum: Arthropoda
- Clade: Pancrustacea
- Class: Insecta
- Order: Lepidoptera
- Family: Tineidae
- Genus: Acrolophus
- Species: A. punctellus

Binomial name
- Acrolophus punctellus (Busck, 1907)

Synonyms
- Neolophus punctellus Busck, 1907

= Acrolophus punctellus =

Species of insect

Acrolophus punctellus is a moth of the family Acrolophidae. It was described by August Busck in 1907. It is found in North America, including Arizona.
