= Acrolophus maculisecta =

Scientific classification
- Domain: Eukaryota
- Kingdom: Animalia
- Phylum: Arthropoda
- Class: Insecta
- Order: Lepidoptera
- Family: Tineidae
- Genus: Acrolophus
- Species: A. maculisecta

Binomial name
- Acrolophus maculisecta Busck, 1914

Synonyms
- Acrolophus dentiger Walsingham, 1915

Species of moth

Acrolophus maculisecta is a moth of the family Acrolophidae. It is found from Mexico to South America.
