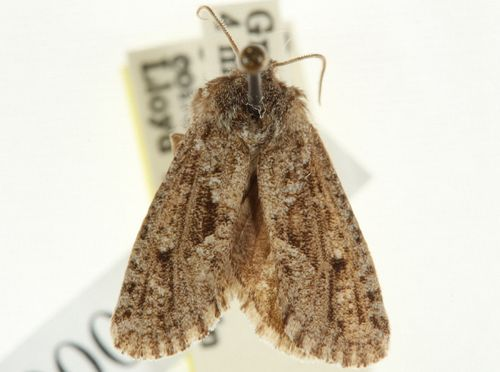

Scientific classification
- Kingdom: Animalia
- Phylum: Arthropoda
- Clade: Pancrustacea
- Class: Insecta
- Order: Lepidoptera
- Family: Tineidae
- Genus: Acrolophus
- Species: A. sinclairi

Binomial name
- Acrolophus sinclairi Hasbrouck, 1964

Synonyms
- Acrolophus nelsoni Hasbrouck, 1964

= Acrolophus sinclairi =

Species of moth

Acrolophus sinclairi is a moth of the family Acrolophidae. It is found in North America, including California, New Mexico and Texas.
