= Acrolophus davisellus =

Scientific classification
- Domain: Eukaryota
- Kingdom: Animalia
- Phylum: Arthropoda
- Class: Insecta
- Order: Lepidoptera
- Family: Tineidae
- Genus: Acrolophus
- Species: A. davisellus

Binomial name
- Acrolophus davisellus Beutenmüller, 1887

Species of moth

Acrolophus davisellus is a moth of the family Acrolophidae. It is found in North America, including Arizona.

The wingspan is about 25 mm.
