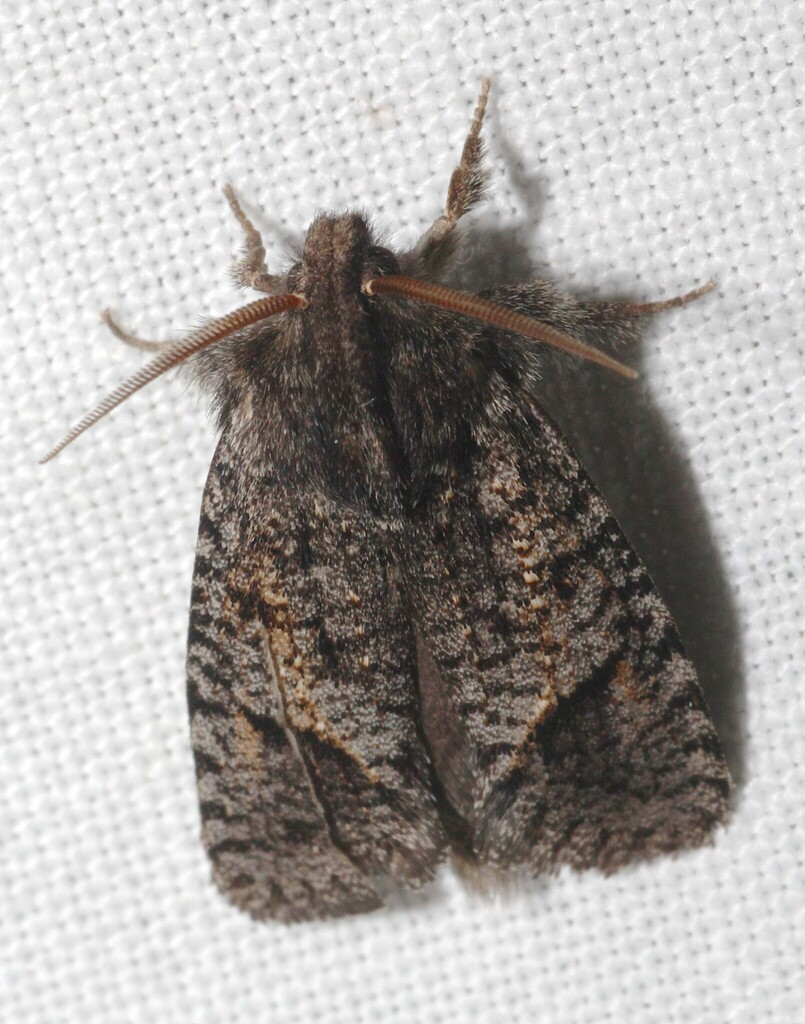

Scientific classification
- Kingdom: Animalia
- Phylum: Arthropoda
- Clade: Pancrustacea
- Class: Insecta
- Order: Lepidoptera
- Family: Tineidae
- Genus: Acrolophus
- Species: A. filicornis

Binomial name
- Acrolophus filicornis (Walsingham, 1887)

Synonyms
- Felderia filicornis Walsingham, 1887; Acrolophus filicornus; Acrolophus mexicanellus Beutenmüller, 1888

= Acrolophus filicornis =

Species of moth

Acrolophus filicornis is a moth of the family Acrolophidae. It was described by Walsingham in 1887. It is found in North America, including Arizona.
