= Acrolophus chloropelta =

Scientific classification
- Kingdom: Animalia
- Phylum: Arthropoda
- Class: Insecta
- Order: Lepidoptera
- Family: Tineidae
- Genus: Acrolophus
- Species: A. chloropelta

Binomial name
- Acrolophus chloropelta Meyrick, 1928

Species of moth

Acrolophus chloropelta is a type of insect, moth of the family Acrolophidae. It is found in Brazil.
