= Acrolophus libitina =

Scientific classification
- Domain: Eukaryota
- Kingdom: Animalia
- Phylum: Arthropoda
- Class: Insecta
- Order: Lepidoptera
- Family: Tineidae
- Genus: Acrolophus
- Species: A. libitina

Binomial name
- Acrolophus libitina (H. Druce, 1901)

Synonyms
- Anaphora libitina H. Druce, 1901

Species of moth

Acrolophus libitina is a moth of the family Acrolophidae first described by Herbert Druce in 1901.
