= Acrolophus rupestris =

Scientific classification
- Domain: Eukaryota
- Kingdom: Animalia
- Phylum: Arthropoda
- Class: Insecta
- Order: Lepidoptera
- Family: Tineidae
- Genus: Acrolophus
- Species: A. rupestris

Binomial name
- Acrolophus rupestris (Walsingham, 1914)

Synonyms
- Apoclisis rupestris Walsingham, 1914

Species of moth

Acrolophus rupestris is a moth of the family Acrolophidae. It is found on Jamaica.
