= Acrolophus pannephela =

Scientific classification
- Domain: Eukaryota
- Kingdom: Animalia
- Phylum: Arthropoda
- Class: Insecta
- Order: Lepidoptera
- Family: Tineidae
- Genus: Acrolophus
- Species: A. pannephela

Binomial name
- Acrolophus pannephela Meyrick, 1931

Species of moth

Acrolophus pannephela is a moth of the family Acrolophidae. It is found in Brazil.
