= Acrolophus condita =

Scientific classification
- Domain: Eukaryota
- Kingdom: Animalia
- Phylum: Arthropoda
- Class: Insecta
- Order: Lepidoptera
- Family: Tineidae
- Genus: Acrolophus
- Species: A. condita

Binomial name
- Acrolophus condita Durrant, 1914

Species of moth

Acrolophus condita is a moth of the family Acrolophidae. It is found in South America.
