= Acrolophus sagaritis =

Scientific classification
- Kingdom: Animalia
- Phylum: Arthropoda
- Class: Insecta
- Order: Lepidoptera
- Family: Tineidae
- Genus: Acrolophus
- Species: A. sagaritis

Binomial name
- Acrolophus sagaritis Meyrick, 1932

Species of moth

Acrolophus sagaritis is a moth of the family Acrolophidae. It is found in Bolivia.
