= Acrolophus macrogaster =

Scientific classification
- Domain: Eukaryota
- Kingdom: Animalia
- Phylum: Arthropoda
- Class: Insecta
- Order: Lepidoptera
- Family: Tineidae
- Genus: Acrolophus
- Species: A. macrogaster

Binomial name
- Acrolophus macrogaster (Walsingham, 1887)

Synonyms
- Anaphora macrogaster Walsingham, 1887; Acrolophus bipectinicornus Hasbrouck, 1964; Acrolophus laminicornus Hasbrouck, 1964; Acrolophus unipectinicornus Hasbrouck, 1964

Species of moth

Acrolophus macrogaster is a moth of the family Acrolophidae. It is found in North America, including Arizona.
