= Acrolophus psoloessa =

Scientific classification
- Kingdom: Animalia
- Phylum: Arthropoda
- Class: Insecta
- Order: Lepidoptera
- Family: Tineidae
- Genus: Acrolophus
- Species: A. psoloessa

Binomial name
- Acrolophus psoloessa Meyrick, 1932

Species of moth

Acrolophus psoloessa is a moth of the family Acrolophidae. It is found in Brazil.
