= Acrolophus echinon =

Scientific classification
- Domain: Eukaryota
- Kingdom: Animalia
- Phylum: Arthropoda
- Class: Insecta
- Order: Lepidoptera
- Family: Tineidae
- Genus: Acrolophus
- Species: A. echinon

Binomial name
- Acrolophus echinon (Druce, 1901)

Synonyms
- Felderia echinon Druce, 1901; Felderia crassicordis Dyar, 1907; Acrolophus robertus Busck, 1920

Species of moth

Acrolophus echinon is a moth of the family Acrolophidae. It is found in Mexico.
