= Acrolophus capex =

Scientific classification
- Kingdom: Animalia
- Phylum: Arthropoda
- Class: Insecta
- Order: Lepidoptera
- Family: Tineidae
- Genus: Acrolophus
- Species: A. capex

Binomial name
- Acrolophus capex Meyrick, 1921

Species of moth

Acrolophus capex is a moth of the family Acrolophidae. It is found in Colombia.
