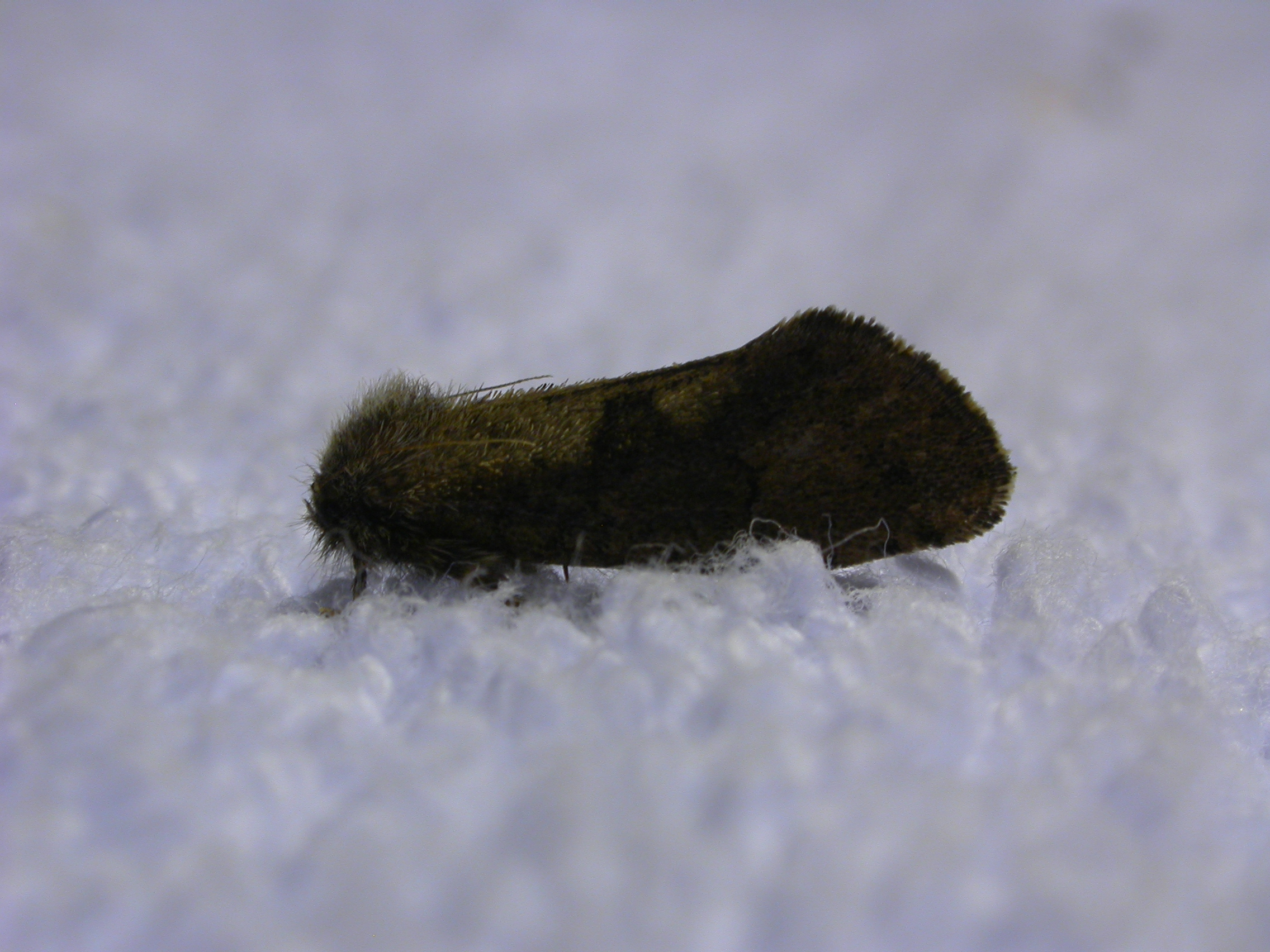

Scientific classification
- Kingdom: Animalia
- Phylum: Arthropoda
- Class: Insecta
- Order: Lepidoptera
- Family: Tineidae
- Genus: Acrolophus
- Species: A. mora

Binomial name
- Acrolophus mora (Grote, 1881)

Synonyms
- Eutheca mora Grote, 1881; Acrolophus morus

= Acrolophus mora =

Species of moth

Acrolophus mora, the dark acrolophus, is a moth of the family Acrolophidae. It was described by Augustus Radcliffe Grote in 1881. It is found in North America, including Florida, Georgia, Illinois, Kentucky, Maryland, Massachusetts, Mississippi, New Hampshire, New York, North Carolina, Ohio, Quebec, South Carolina, Tennessee, Virginia and West Virginia.

The wingspan is about 20 mm for males and 26 mm for females.
