= Acrolophus leucodocis =

Scientific classification
- Kingdom: Animalia
- Phylum: Arthropoda
- Clade: Pancrustacea
- Class: Insecta
- Order: Lepidoptera
- Family: Tineidae
- Genus: Acrolophus
- Species: A. leucodocis

Binomial name
- Acrolophus leucodocis (Zeller, 1877)

Synonyms
- Anaphora leucodocis Zeller, 1877; Dorota medioliniella Kearfott, 1907

Species of moth

Acrolophus leucodocis is a moth of the family Acrolophidae. It was described by Zeller in 1877. It is found in North America.
