= Acrolophus mimasalis =

Scientific classification
- Kingdom: Animalia
- Phylum: Arthropoda
- Class: Insecta
- Order: Lepidoptera
- Family: Tineidae
- Genus: Acrolophus
- Species: A. mimasalis

Binomial name
- Acrolophus mimasalis (Walker, 1858)

Synonyms
- Palthis mimasalis Walker, 1858; Anaphora mimasalis; Tachasara languidalis Walker, 1865; Daulia indecora Walker, 1863

Species of moth

Acrolophus mimasalis is a moth of the family Acrolophidae. It is found in the West Indies.
