= Acrolophus setiacma =

Scientific classification
- Kingdom: Animalia
- Phylum: Arthropoda
- Class: Insecta
- Order: Lepidoptera
- Family: Tineidae
- Genus: Acrolophus
- Species: A. setiacma

Binomial name
- Acrolophus setiacma Meyrick, 1923

Species of moth

Acrolophus setiacma is a moth of the family Acrolophidae. It is found in Brazil.
