= Acrolophus marcida =

Scientific classification
- Domain: Eukaryota
- Kingdom: Animalia
- Phylum: Arthropoda
- Class: Insecta
- Order: Lepidoptera
- Family: Tineidae
- Genus: Acrolophus
- Species: A. marcida

Binomial name
- Acrolophus marcida Walsingham, 1914

Species of moth

Acrolophus marcida is a moth of the family Acrolophidae. It is found in South America.
