= Acrolophus poeyi =

Scientific classification
- Kingdom: Animalia
- Phylum: Arthropoda
- Class: Insecta
- Order: Lepidoptera
- Family: Tineidae
- Genus: Acrolophus
- Species: A. poeyi

Binomial name
- Acrolophus poeyi Walsingham, 1891

Species of moth

Acrolophus poeyi is a moth of the family Acrolophidae. It is found on St. Vincent.
