= Acrolophus argentinus =

Scientific classification
- Domain: Eukaryota
- Kingdom: Animalia
- Phylum: Arthropoda
- Class: Insecta
- Order: Lepidoptera
- Family: Tineidae
- Genus: Acrolophus
- Species: A. argentinus

Binomial name
- Acrolophus argentinus Walsingham, 1887

Species of moth

Acrolophus argentinus is a moth of the family Acrolophidae. It is found in Argentina.
