= Acrolophus australis =

Scientific classification
- Domain: Eukaryota
- Kingdom: Animalia
- Phylum: Arthropoda
- Class: Insecta
- Order: Lepidoptera
- Family: Tineidae
- Genus: Acrolophus
- Species: A. australis

Binomial name
- Acrolophus australis Walsingham, 1897

Species of moth

Acrolophus australis is a moth of the family Acrolophidae. It is found in the West Indies.
