= Acrolophus anaphorella =

Scientific classification
- Domain: Eukaryota
- Kingdom: Animalia
- Phylum: Arthropoda
- Class: Insecta
- Order: Lepidoptera
- Family: Tineidae
- Genus: Acrolophus
- Species: A. anaphorella

Binomial name
- Acrolophus anaphorella (Walsingham, 1892)

Synonyms
- Amydria anaphorella Walsingham, 1892

Species of moth

Acrolophus anaphorella is a moth of the family Acrolophidae. It is found on the Windward Islands.
