= Acrolophus bidens =

Scientific classification
- Domain: Eukaryota
- Kingdom: Animalia
- Phylum: Arthropoda
- Class: Insecta
- Order: Lepidoptera
- Family: Tineidae
- Genus: Acrolophus
- Species: A. bidens

Binomial name
- Acrolophus bidens Walsingham, 1915

Species of moth

Acrolophus bidens is a moth of the family Acrolophidae. It is found in Central America.
