= Acrolophus echinura =

Scientific classification
- Kingdom: Animalia
- Phylum: Arthropoda
- Class: Insecta
- Order: Lepidoptera
- Family: Tineidae
- Genus: Acrolophus
- Species: A. echinura

Binomial name
- Acrolophus echinura Meyrick, 1915

Species of moth

Acrolophus echinura is a moth of the family Acrolophidae. It is found in South America.
