= Acrolophus anathyrsa =

Scientific classification
- Kingdom: Animalia
- Phylum: Arthropoda
- Class: Insecta
- Order: Lepidoptera
- Family: Tineidae
- Genus: Acrolophus
- Species: A. anathyrsa

Binomial name
- Acrolophus anathyrsa Meyrick, 1919

Species of moth

Acrolophus anathyrsa is a moth of the family Acrolophidae. It is found in Guyana.
