= Acrolophus klotsi =

Scientific classification
- Domain: Eukaryota
- Kingdom: Animalia
- Phylum: Arthropoda
- Class: Insecta
- Order: Lepidoptera
- Family: Tineidae
- Genus: Acrolophus
- Species: A. klotsi

Binomial name
- Acrolophus klotsi Hasbrouck, 1964

Species of moth

Acrolophus klotsi is a moth of the family Acrolophidae. It was described by Hasbrouck in 1964. It is found in the U.S. state of Arizona.
