= Acrolophus luriei =

Scientific classification
- Domain: Eukaryota
- Kingdom: Animalia
- Phylum: Arthropoda
- Class: Insecta
- Order: Lepidoptera
- Family: Tineidae
- Genus: Acrolophus
- Species: A. luriei

Binomial name
- Acrolophus luriei Hasbrouck, 1964

Species of moth

Acrolophus luriei is a moth of the family Acrolophidae. It was described by Hasbrouck in 1964. It is found in North America, including Arizona.
