= Acrolophus quadrellus =

Scientific classification
- Domain: Eukaryota
- Kingdom: Animalia
- Phylum: Arthropoda
- Class: Insecta
- Order: Lepidoptera
- Family: Tineidae
- Genus: Acrolophus
- Species: A. quadrellus

Binomial name
- Acrolophus quadrellus (Barnes & McDunnough, 1913)

Synonyms
- Pseudanaphora quadrellus Barnes & McDunnough, 1913

Species of moth

Acrolophus quadrellus is a moth of the family Acrolophidae. It was described by William Barnes and James Halliday McDunnough in 1913. It is found in North America, including Arizona.
