= Acrolophus bactra =

Scientific classification
- Kingdom: Animalia
- Phylum: Arthropoda
- Class: Insecta
- Order: Lepidoptera
- Family: Tineidae
- Genus: Acrolophus
- Species: A. bactra

Binomial name
- Acrolophus bactra Busck, 1914

Species of moth

Acrolophus bactra is a moth of the family Acrolophidae. It is found in Panama.
