= Acrolophus arimusalis =

Scientific classification
- Kingdom: Animalia
- Phylum: Arthropoda
- Class: Insecta
- Order: Lepidoptera
- Family: Tineidae
- Genus: Acrolophus
- Species: A. arimusalis

Binomial name
- Acrolophus arimusalis (Walker, 1858)

Synonyms
- Palthis arimusalis Walker, 1858

Species of moth

Acrolophus arimusalis is a moth of the family Acrolophidae. It is found in Brazil (Para).
