= Acrolophus exaphrista =

Scientific classification
- Kingdom: Animalia
- Phylum: Arthropoda
- Class: Insecta
- Order: Lepidoptera
- Family: Tineidae
- Genus: Acrolophus
- Species: A. exaphrista

Binomial name
- Acrolophus exaphrista Meyrick, 1919

Synonyms
- Acrolophus exaphristus

Species of moth

Acrolophus exaphrista is a moth of the family Acrolophidae. It was described by Edward Meyrick in 1919. It is found in North America.
