= Acrolophus arcasalis =

Scientific classification
- Kingdom: Animalia
- Phylum: Arthropoda
- Class: Insecta
- Order: Lepidoptera
- Family: Tineidae
- Genus: Acrolophus
- Species: A. arcasalis

Binomial name
- Acrolophus arcasalis (Walker, 1858)

Synonyms
- Palthis arcasalis Walker, 1858

Species of moth

Acrolophus arcasalis is a moth of the family Acrolophidae. It is found in the West Indies.
