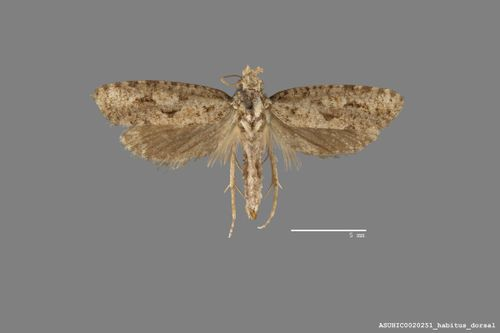

Scientific classification
- Kingdom: Animalia
- Phylum: Arthropoda
- Clade: Pancrustacea
- Class: Insecta
- Order: Lepidoptera
- Family: Tineidae
- Genus: Acrolophus
- Species: A. macrophallus

Binomial name
- Acrolophus macrophallus Hasbrouck, 1964

= Acrolophus macrophallus =

Species of moth

Acrolophus macrophallus is a moth of the family Acrolophidae. It was described by Hasbrouck in 1964. It is found in North America, including Arizona.
