= Acrolophus punctata =

Scientific classification
- Kingdom: Animalia
- Phylum: Arthropoda
- Class: Insecta
- Order: Lepidoptera
- Family: Tineidae
- Genus: Acrolophus
- Species: A. punctata

Binomial name
- Acrolophus punctata (H. Druce, 1901)

Synonyms
- Anaphora punctata H. Druce, 1901

Species of moth

Acrolophus punctata is a moth of the family Acrolophidae first described by Herbert Druce in 1901. It is found in Costa Rica.
