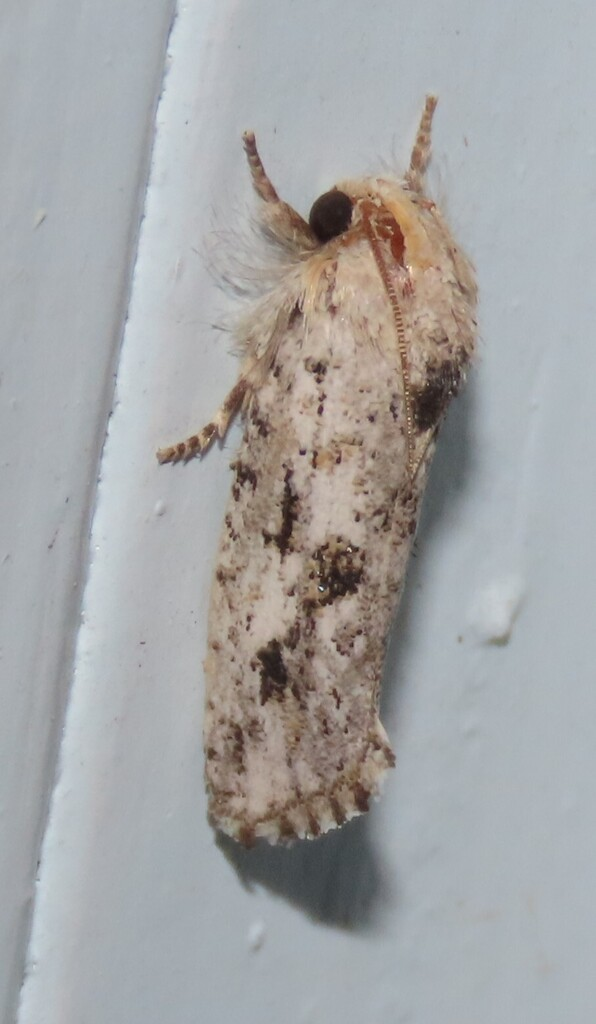

Scientific classification
- Kingdom: Animalia
- Phylum: Arthropoda
- Clade: Pancrustacea
- Class: Insecta
- Order: Lepidoptera
- Family: Tineidae
- Genus: Acrolophus
- Species: A. griseus

Binomial name
- Acrolophus griseus (Walsingham, 1887)

Synonyms
- Hypoclopus griseus Walsingham, 1887; Acrolophus leucallactis Meyrick, 1919; Acrolophus capitatus Hasbrouck, 1964

= Acrolophus griseus =

Species of moth

Acrolophus griseus is a moth of the family Acrolophidae. It was described by Walsingham in 1887. It is found in North America, including Arizona, California, Nevada and Texas.
