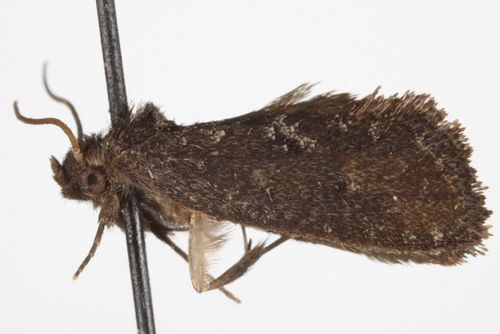

Scientific classification
- Kingdom: Animalia
- Phylum: Arthropoda
- Clade: Pancrustacea
- Class: Insecta
- Order: Lepidoptera
- Family: Tineidae
- Genus: Acrolophus
- Species: A. cockerelli

Binomial name
- Acrolophus cockerelli (Dyar, 1900)

Synonyms
- Eulepiste cockerelli Dyar, 1900

= Acrolophus cockerelli =

Species of moth

Acrolophus cockerelli is a moth of the family Acrolophidae. It is found in North America, including Arizona, Nevada, New Mexico, Oklahoma, Oregon and Texas.

The wingspan is about 17 mm.
