= Acrolophus bifurcata =

Scientific classification
- Domain: Eukaryota
- Kingdom: Animalia
- Phylum: Arthropoda
- Class: Insecta
- Order: Lepidoptera
- Family: Tineidae
- Genus: Acrolophus
- Species: A. bifurcata

Binomial name
- Acrolophus bifurcata Busck, 1914

Species of moth

Acrolophus bifurcata is a moth of the family Acrolophidae. It is found in Panama.
