= Acrolophus granulatella =

Scientific classification
- Kingdom: Animalia
- Phylum: Arthropoda
- Class: Insecta
- Order: Lepidoptera
- Family: Tineidae
- Genus: Acrolophus
- Species: A. granulatella

Binomial name
- Acrolophus granulatella (Walker, 1863)

Synonyms
- Tirasia granulatella Walker, 1863

Species of moth

Acrolophus granulatella is a moth of the family Acrolophidae. It is found in Brazil.
