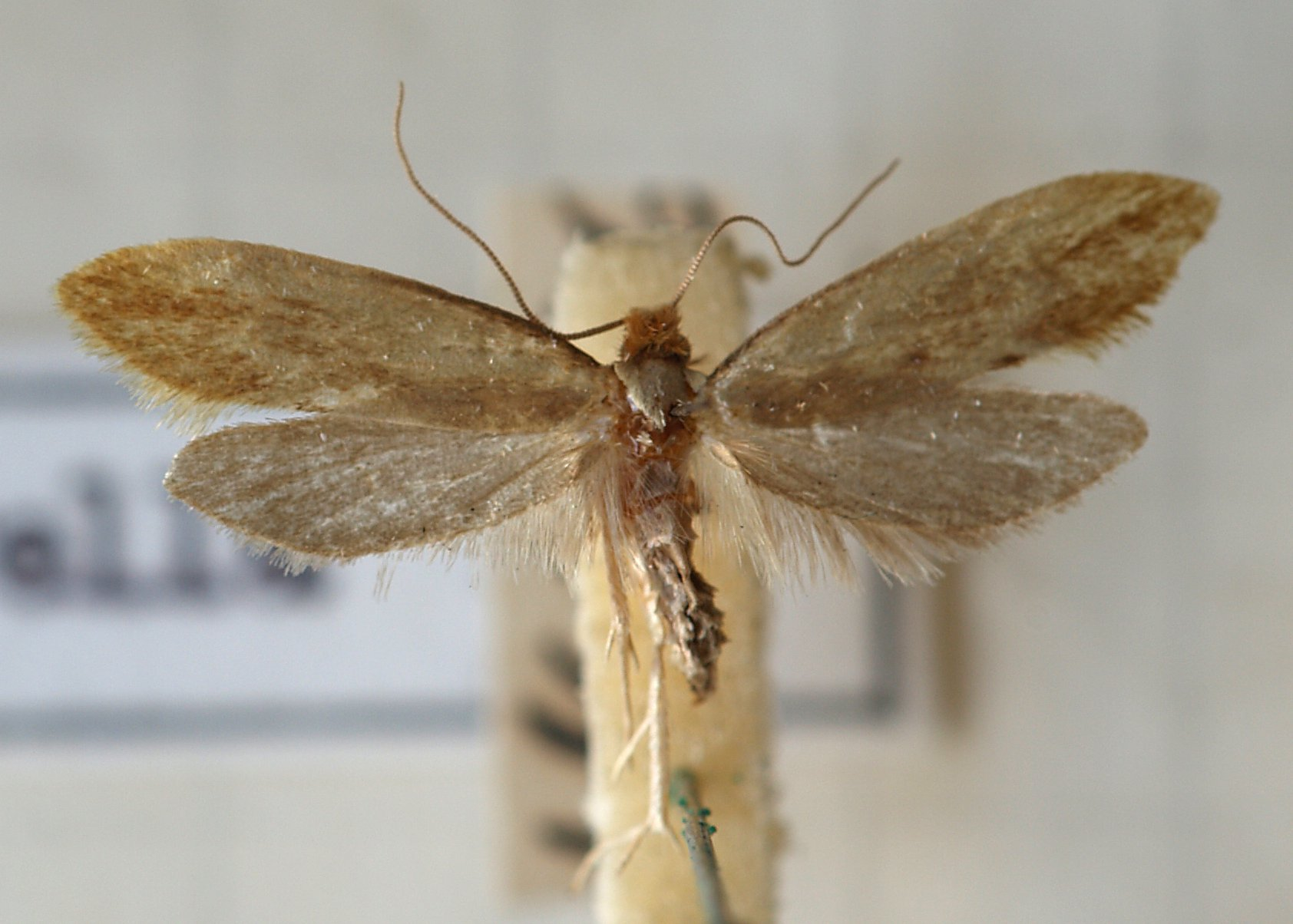
- Tinea semifulvella

Scientific classification
- Kingdom: Animalia
- Phylum: Arthropoda
- Clade: Pancrustacea
- Class: Insecta
- Order: Lepidoptera
- Family: Tineidae
- Subfamily: Tineinae; Latreille, 1810

Type genus
- Tinea Linnaeus, 1758

Synonyms
- Blabophaninae Spuler, 1898; Monopinae Spuler, 1910

= Tineinae =

Subfamily of moths

The Tineinae are a subfamily of moths of the family Tineidae.

== Genera ==
- Acridotarsa
- Anomalotinea
- Asymphyla
- Ceratobia
- Ceratophaga
- Ceratuncus
- Crypsithyris
- Crypsithyrodes
- Eccritothrix
- Elatobia
- Enargocrasis
- Eremicola
- Graphicoptila
- Hippiochaetes
- Kangerosithyris
- Lipomerinx
- Metatinea
- Miramonopis
- Monopis
- Nearolyma
- Niditinea
- Ocnophilella
- Phereoeca
- Praeacedes
- Pringleophaga
- Proterodesma
- Proterospastis
- Reisserita
- Stemagoris
- Tetrapalpus
- Thomintarra
- Tinea
- Tinemelitta
- Tineola
- Tineomigma
- Trichophaga
- Tryptodema
- Wyoma
- Xerantica
