= Tineola atricoma =

Scientific classification
- Kingdom: Animalia
- Phylum: Arthropoda
- Clade: Pancrustacea
- Class: Insecta
- Order: Lepidoptera
- Family: Tineidae
- Genus: Tineola
- Species: T. atricoma

Binomial name
- Tineola atricoma Meyrick, 1931

Species of moth

Tineola atricoma is a species of fungus moth (family Tineidae, subfamily Tineinae). It is known from Antananarivo, Madagascar.

This species has a wingspan of 18 mm. Head black. Palpi dark fuscous. Antennae over l, pale greyish. Thorax light purplish grey, anterior margin black. Forewings elongate, costa gently arched, apex obtuse, termen very obliquely rounded; deep greyish purple, cilia pale grey. Hindwings purplish-bronzy grey; cilia light grey.

== Related pages ==
- List of moths of Madagascar#Tineidae
