= Antipolistes anthracella =

Scientific classification
- Kingdom: Animalia
- Phylum: Arthropoda
- Clade: Pancrustacea
- Class: Insecta
- Order: Lepidoptera
- Family: Tineidae
- Genus: Antipolistes
- Species: A. anthracella

Binomial name
- Antipolistes anthracella Forbes, 1933

Synonyms
- Tinea latebrivora Meyrick, 1935

Species of moth

Antipolistes anthracella is a moth of the family Tineidae.

Their larvae are scavangers or predators of wasp nests (Polistes sp.). This species is known from Cuba, Puerto Rico, Trinidad and from Brazil.
