= Psecadioides =

Scientific classification
- Kingdom: Animalia
- Phylum: Arthropoda
- Clade: Pancrustacea
- Class: Insecta
- Order: Lepidoptera
- Family: Tineidae
- Subfamily: Euplocaminae
- Genus: Psecadioides; Butler, 1881

Synonyms
- Luffiodes S. Matsumura, 1931

Genus of moths

Psecadioides is a genus of moths belonging to the family Tineidae.

== Species ==
- Psecadioides aspersus Butler, 1881 (=Luffiodes apicalis Matsumura, 1931)
- Psecadioides cuneus G.H. Huang, Hirowatari & M. Wang, 2010
- Psecadioides owadai G.H. Huang, Hirowatari & M. Wang, 2010
- Psecadioides prominens G.H. Huang, Hirowatari & M. Wang, 2010
- Psecadioides tanylopha (Meyrick, 1932)
