= Petasactis =

Conservation status
- Data Deficit (NZ TCS)

Scientific classification
- Kingdom: Animalia
- Phylum: Arthropoda
- Clade: Pancrustacea
- Class: Insecta
- Order: Lepidoptera
- Family: Tineidae
- Genus: Petasactis; Meyrick, 1915
- Species: P. technica

Binomial name
- Petasactis technica (Meyrick, 1888)

Synonyms
- Ereunetis technica Meyrick, 1888

Genus of moths

Petasactis is a genus of moths belonging to the family Tineidae. It contains only one species, Petasactis technica, which is endemic to New Zealand. This species has not been collected since prior to 1888. In 2025 it was classified under the New Zealand Threat Classification System as being "data deficient" and possibly extinct.

== Taxonomy ==
This genus was described by Edward Meyrick in 1915. The species was also described by Edward Meyrick in 1888 and originally named Ereunetis technica using a female specimen he collected at Whangarei Heads in December. In 1915 Meyrick reassigned this species to the genus Petasactis when he revised New Zealand Tineina. George Hudson discussed this species in his 1928 book The Butterflies and Moths of New Zealand. The holotype specimen is held at the Natural History Museum, London.

== Description ==
Meyrick described the species as follows:

Female.—12 mm. Head white, crown ochreous-tinged. Palpi white, beneath with some black scales. Antennæ white, with a black scale-streak at base. Thorax ochreous-white, with a lateral brownish-ochreous stripe. Abdomen grey. Anterior legs blackish; middle and posterior legs ochreous-white. Forewings elongate - lanceolate; greyish - ochreous, suffused with rather dark fuscous towards inner margin; markings white, faintly ochreous-tinged; a very fine longitudinal median line from base to 2/3, seven wedge-shaped strigulae from costa, first two very oblique, reaching half across wing, first connected with base by a slender costal streak, five latter shorter and less oblique; a subtriangular spot on inner margin at 1/3, and a sub-oval one at 2/3, a small black apical spot: cilia light greyish-ochreous, with a blackish-grey median line on upper half, some white scales at base towards middle of hindmargin, and two diverging blackish hooks at apex. Hindwings and cilia light grey; costal cilia whitish.

== Distribution ==
This species is endemic to New Zealand. This species is only known to be present at its type locality.

== Biology and behaviour ==
The biology of this species is largely unknown. Adult moths are on the wing in December.

== Host species ==
It has been hypothesised that P. technica larva inhabit and consume dead leaves of large monocots or dead wood.

== Conservation status ==
In 2025 this species was classified by the New Zealand Department of Conservation as "data deficient" under the New Zealand Threat Classification System. It is regarded as being possibly extinct.
