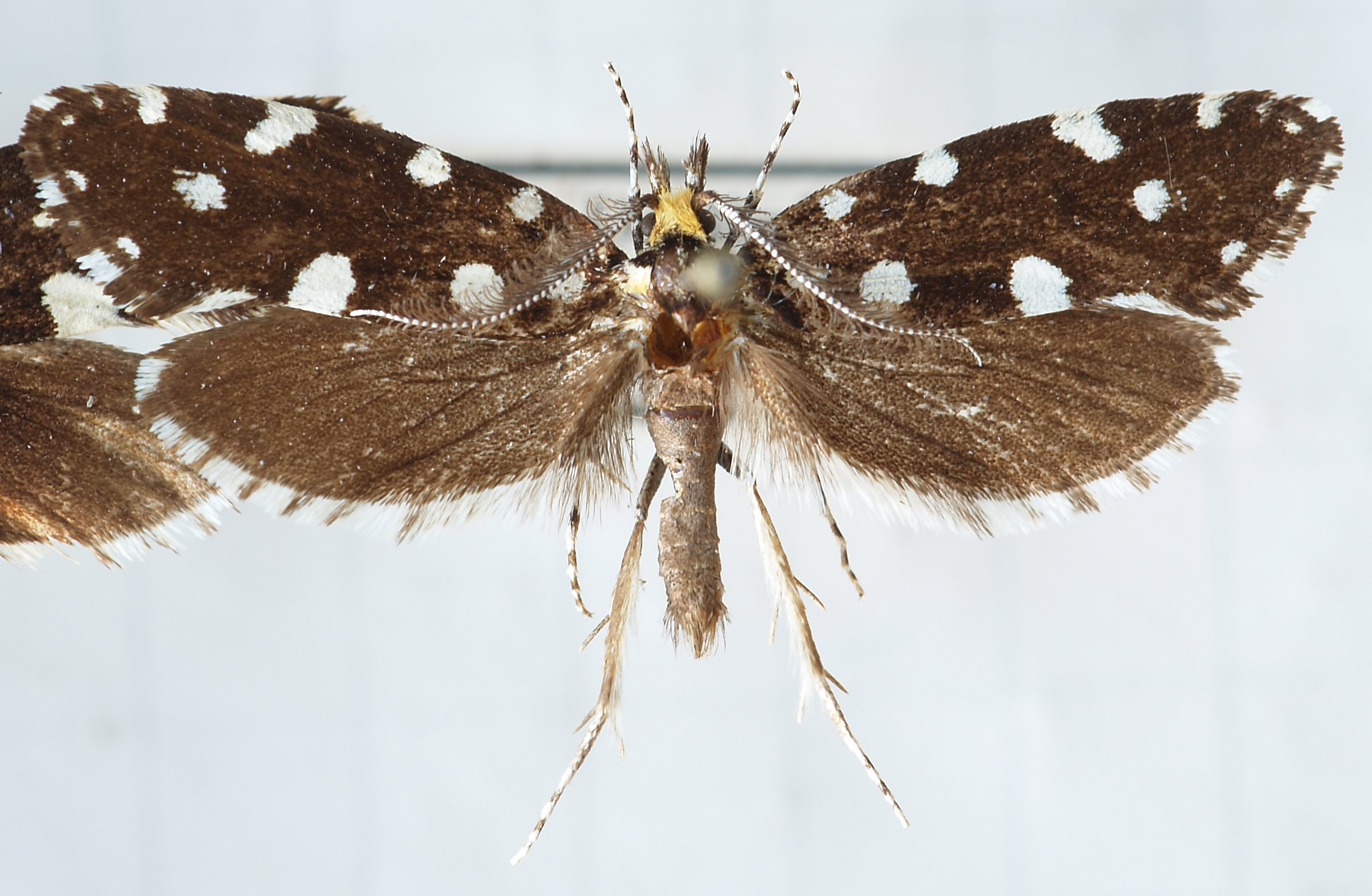

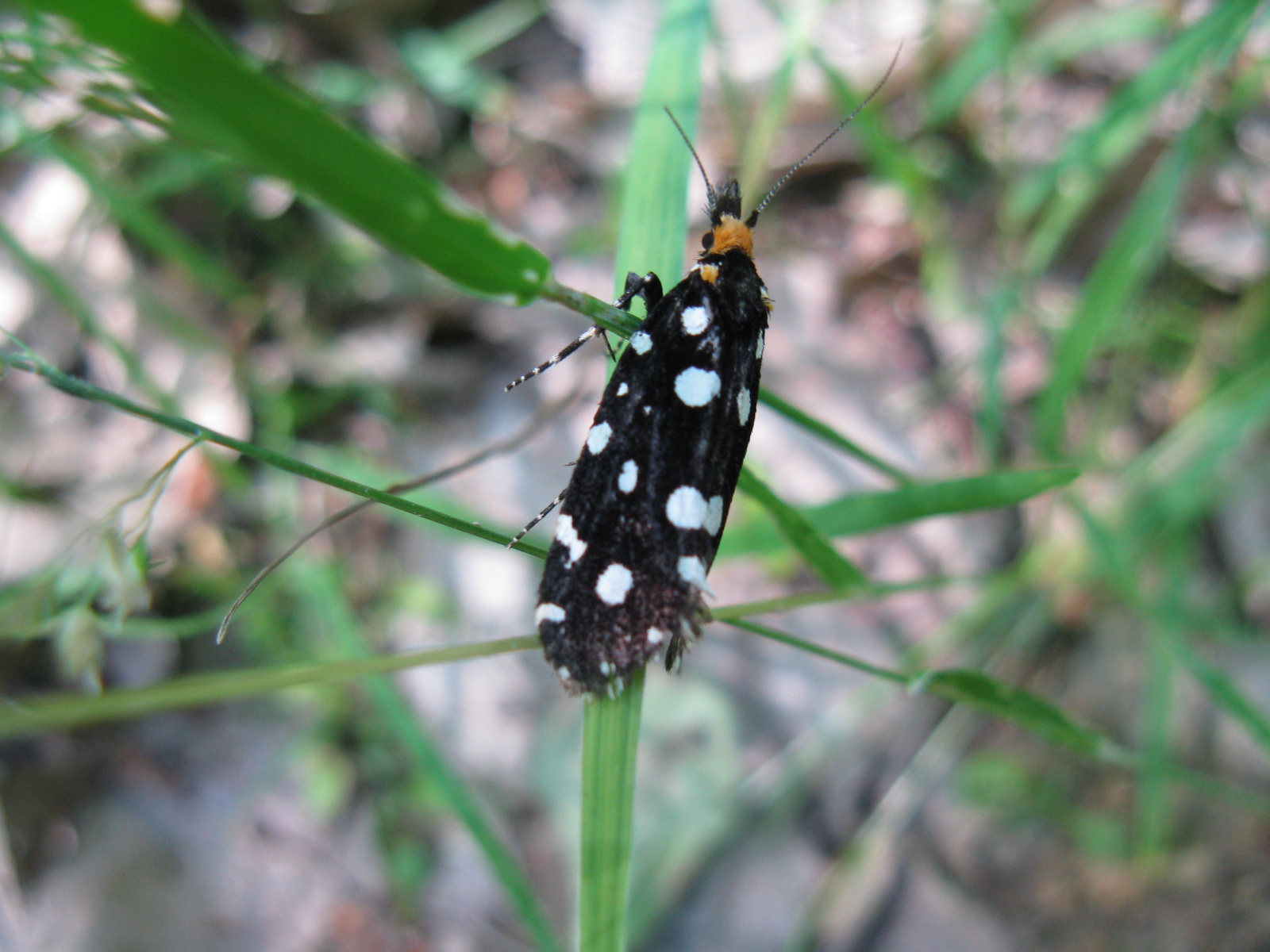

Scientific classification
- Kingdom: Animalia
- Phylum: Arthropoda
- Clade: Pancrustacea
- Class: Insecta
- Order: Lepidoptera
- Family: Tineidae
- Genus: Euplocamus
- Species: E. anthracinalis

Binomial name
- Euplocamus anthracinalis (Scopoli, 1763)

= Euplocamus anthracinalis =

Species of moth

Euplocamus anthracinalis is a species of tineoid moth. It belongs to the fungus moth family (Tineidae), and among these to the subfamily Euplocaminae.

This moth inhabits humid woodland. It is found in the western Palearctic, where it is not rare east of the Germany region, but at least uncommon if not entirely absent in western continental Europe. For Britain for example, there exists (as of the late 2000s) only a single early 19th century record. With little or no associated information as to locality or circumstances, it may well be entirely in error.

The adults are on the wing in the summer months, approximately from May to August depending on location. They are largish moths (wingspan 25–33 mm) whose black forewings are dappled with (usually) 8 large and a few smaller white dots. The dusky hindwings have a neat white border. The head is ruddy but the entire animal bleaches easy as museum specimen. The caterpillars inhabit rotting wood, which they feed on; they also eat bracket fungi growing on it.
