= Crypsithyris immolata =

Scientific classification
- Kingdom: Animalia
- Phylum: Arthropoda
- Class: Insecta
- Order: Lepidoptera
- Family: Tineidae
- Genus: Crypsithyris
- Species: C. immolata

Binomial name
- Crypsithyris immolata (Meyrick, 1931)

Synonyms
- Tinea immolata Meyrick, 1931; Aganoptila immolata

Species of moth

Crypsithyris immolata is a moth in the family Tineidae. It was described by Edward Meyrick in 1931. It is found in India.
