= Catalectis =

Scientific classification
- Kingdom: Animalia
- Phylum: Arthropoda
- Clade: Pancrustacea
- Class: Insecta
- Order: Lepidoptera
- Family: Tineidae
- Genus: Catalectis; Meyrick, 1920

Type species
- Catalectis pharetropa Meyrick, 1920

Species
- 3, see text

Genus of moths

Catalectis is a small genus of the fungus moth family, Tineidae. It is a small and little-studied group, whose precise relationships remain to be discovered. C. pharetropa was once mistaken for a species of Clepticodes, and Oenoe drosoptila of the Meessiinae was also proposed as a species of Catalectis; ít may be that these are all, in fact, closely related.

Only three species are presently contained in this genus:

- Catalectis flexa Bradley, 1957
- Catalectis pharetropa Meyrick, 1920 (= C. clasmatica)
- Catalectis ptilozona Meyrick, 1923
