= Nyctocyrmata crotalopis =

Scientific classification
- Kingdom: Animalia
- Phylum: Arthropoda
- Clade: Pancrustacea
- Class: Insecta
- Order: Lepidoptera
- Family: Tineidae
- Subfamily: Myrmecozelinae
- Genus: Nyctocyrmata; Gozmany & Vári, 1973
- Species: N. crotalopis

Binomial name
- Nyctocyrmata crotalopis (Meyrick, 1921)

Synonyms
- Macraeola crotalopis Meyrick, 1921; Oinophila amphicrossa Meyrick, 1921

Species of moth

Nyctocyrmata crotalopis is a species of moth belonging to the family Tineidae.

This species is presently known only from South Africa. It has a wingspan of 6mm.
