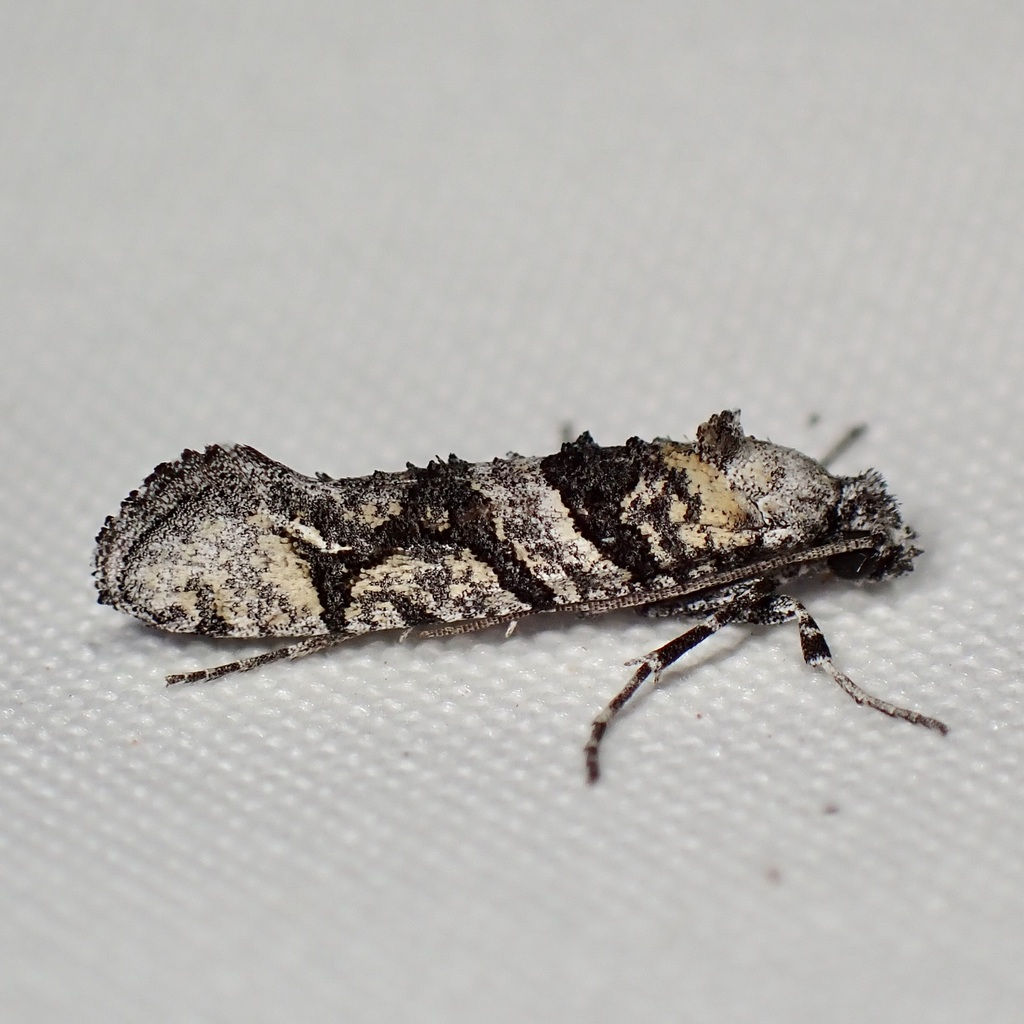

Scientific classification
- Kingdom: Animalia
- Phylum: Arthropoda
- Clade: Pancrustacea
- Class: Insecta
- Order: Lepidoptera
- Family: Tineidae
- Subfamily: Tineinae
- Genus: Dyotopasta; Busck, 1907
- Species: D. yumaella

Binomial name
- Dyotopasta yumaella (Kearfott, 1907)

Synonyms
- Genus: Pseudoxylesthia Walsingham, 1907; Species: Pseudoxylesthia angustella Walsingham, 1907

= Dyotopasta =

Genus of moths

Dyotopasta is a genus of moths belonging to the family Tineidae. It contains only one species, Dyotopasta yumaella, which is found in the south-western part of the United States, including Arizona, New Mexico and Texas.

The wingspan is about 25 mm.
