= Eupithecia streptozona =

Scientific classification
- Kingdom: Animalia
- Phylum: Arthropoda
- Clade: Pancrustacea
- Class: Insecta
- Order: Lepidoptera
- Family: Geometridae
- Genus: Eupithecia
- Species: E. streptozona

Binomial name
- Eupithecia streptozona L. B. Prout, 1932

Species of moth

Eupithecia streptozona is a moth in the family Geometridae. The genus is highly speciose, with over 1400 species, and members of the genus are present in most of the world with exception of Australasia.
