= Tineola anaphecola =

Scientific classification
- Kingdom: Animalia
- Phylum: Arthropoda
- Clade: Pancrustacea
- Class: Insecta
- Order: Lepidoptera
- Family: Tineidae
- Genus: Tineola
- Species: T. anaphecola

Binomial name
- Tineola anaphecola Gozmány, 1967

Species of moth

Tineola anaphecola is a species of fungus moth. It is native to tropical the Democratic Republic of the Congo.
