= Nyctocyrmata numeesia =

Scientific classification
- Kingdom: Animalia
- Phylum: Arthropoda
- Clade: Pancrustacea
- Class: Insecta
- Order: Lepidoptera
- Family: Tineidae
- Subfamily: Myrmecozelinae
- Genus: Nyctocyrmata; Gozmany & Vári, 1973
- Species: N. numeesia

Binomial name
- Nyctocyrmata numeesia Mey, 2011

Species of moth

Nyctocyrmata numeesia is a species of moth belonging to the family Tineidae that is known from Namibia.
