= Crypsithyrodes concolorella =

Scientific classification
- Kingdom: Animalia
- Phylum: Arthropoda
- Class: Insecta
- Order: Lepidoptera
- Family: Tineidae
- Genus: Crypsithyrodes
- Species: C. concolorella

Binomial name
- Crypsithyrodes concolorella (Walker, 1863)

Synonyms
- Tinea concolorella Walker, 1863; Blabophanes obumbrata Butler, 1881; Crypsithyrodes obumbrata (Butler, 1881); Monopis obumbrata; Crypsithyris effusa Meyrick, 1917; Crypsithyris sladeni Bradley, 1957; Crypsithyris tromerodes Meyrick, 1921; Tinea ignotella Walker, 1864

Species of moth

Crypsithyrodes concolorella is a moth of the family Tineidae. It was first described by Francis Walker in 1863. It is pantropical, it has been recorded from Australia, French Polynesia, the Seychelles, Fiji, Hawaii, Java, Rennell Island, the Caroline Islands and Malaya, Brazil, Peru, Sierra Leone, Tanzania, Pakistan and Solomon Islands

On the Seychelles, it is associated with the Seychelles sheath tailed bat (Coleura seychellensis).
