= Tomara tigrinella =

Scientific classification
- Kingdom: Animalia
- Phylum: Arthropoda
- Clade: Pancrustacea
- Class: Insecta
- Order: Lepidoptera
- Family: Tineidae
- Genus: Tomara; Walker, 1864
- Species: T. tigrinella

Binomial name
- Tomara tigrinella Walker, 1864

Species of moth

Tomara tigrinella is a species of moth, found on Borneo. It is the only species in the genus Tomara, and belongs to the family Tineidae.
