= Exonomasis =

Scientific classification
- Kingdom: Animalia
- Phylum: Arthropoda
- Clade: Pancrustacea
- Class: Insecta
- Order: Lepidoptera
- Family: Tineidae
- Subfamily: Myrmecozelinae
- Genus: Exonomasis; Gozmány & Vári, 1973
- Species: E. exolescens

Binomial name
- Exonomasis exolescens (Meyrick, 1926)

Synonyms
- Tinea exolescens Meyrick, 1926

Genus of moths

Exonomasis is a genus of moths belonging to the family Tineidae. It contains only one species, Exonomasis exolescens, which is found in South Africa.
