= Episyrta =

Scientific classification
- Kingdom: Animalia
- Phylum: Arthropoda
- Clade: Pancrustacea
- Class: Insecta
- Order: Lepidoptera
- Family: Tineidae
- Genus: Episyrta; Meyrick, 1929

Genus of moths

Episyrta is a genus of moths belonging to the family Tineidae.

== Species ==
- Episyrta coniomicta Meyrick, 1929
- Episyrta protonistis Meyrick, 1930
