= Eremicola =

Scientific classification
- Kingdom: Animalia
- Phylum: Arthropoda
- Clade: Pancrustacea
- Class: Insecta
- Order: Lepidoptera
- Family: Tineidae
- Subfamily: Tineinae
- Genus: Eremicola; Amsel, 1935
- Species: E. semitica

Binomial name
- Eremicola semitica Amsel, 1935

Genus of moths

Eremicola is a genus of moths belonging to the family Tineidae. It contains only one species, Eremicola semitica, which is found in Palestinian Territories.
