= Polypsecta =

Scientific classification
- Kingdom: Animalia
- Phylum: Arthropoda
- Clade: Pancrustacea
- Class: Insecta
- Order: Lepidoptera
- Family: Tineidae
- Genus: Polypsecta; Meyrick, 1930
- Species: P. halmeuta

Binomial name
- Polypsecta halmeuta Meyrick, 1930

Genus of moths

Polypsecta is a genus of moths belonging to the family Tineidae. It contains only one species, Polypsecta halmeuta, which is found in Brazil.
