= Sciomystis =

Scientific classification
- Kingdom: Animalia
- Phylum: Arthropoda
- Clade: Pancrustacea
- Class: Insecta
- Order: Lepidoptera
- Family: Tineidae
- Genus: Sciomystis; Meyrick, 1919
- Species: S. amynias

Binomial name
- Sciomystis amynias Meyrick, 1919

Genus of moths

Sciomystis is a genus of moths belonging to the family Tineidae. It contains only one species, Sciomystis amynias, which is found in India.

The wingspan is 9–10 mm. The forewings are elongate and dark fuscous. The hindwings and cilia are rather dark fuscous.
