= Pezetaera =

Scientific classification
- Kingdom: Animalia
- Phylum: Arthropoda
- Clade: Pancrustacea
- Class: Insecta
- Order: Lepidoptera
- Family: Tineidae
- Genus: Pezetaera; Meyrick, 1924
- Species: P. hoplanthes

Binomial name
- Pezetaera hoplanthes Meyrick, 1924

Genus of moths

Pezetaera is a genus of moths belonging to the family Tineidae. It contains only one species, Pezetaera hoplanthes, which is found on Java.
