= Dryadaulinae =

Scientific classification
- Kingdom: Animalia
- Phylum: Arthropoda
- Clade: Pancrustacea
- Class: Insecta
- Order: Lepidoptera
- Family: Tineidae
- Subfamily: Dryadaulinae; Bradley, 1966

Synonyms
- Archimeessiini Zagulyaev, 1977

Subfamily of moths

The Dryadaulinae are a subfamily of moth of the family Tineidae.

== Genera ==
- Brachydoxa Meyrick, 1917
- Dryadaula Meyrick, 1893
