= Eucrotala =

Scientific classification
- Kingdom: Animalia
- Phylum: Arthropoda
- Clade: Pancrustacea
- Class: Insecta
- Order: Lepidoptera
- Family: Tineidae
- Genus: Eucrotala; Meyrick, 1917

Genus of moths

Eucrotala is a genus of moths belonging to the family Tineidae.

== Species ==
- Eucrotala nucleata Meyrick, 1917
- Eucrotala tetracola Meyrick, 1919
