= Graphidivalva =

Scientific classification
- Kingdom: Animalia
- Phylum: Arthropoda
- Clade: Pancrustacea
- Class: Insecta
- Order: Lepidoptera
- Family: Tineidae
- Subfamily: Myrmecozelinae
- Genus: Graphidivalva; Gozmány, 1965
- Species: G. genitalis

Binomial name
- Graphidivalva genitalis (Meyrick, 1913)

Synonyms
- Scardia genitalis Meyrick, 1913

Genus of moths

Graphidivalva is a genus of moths belonging to the family Tineidae. It contains only one species, Graphidivalva genitalis, which is found in South Africa.

This species has a wingspan of 11–12 mm.
