= Bascantis =

- Holotype of Bascantis sirenica

Conservation status
- Data Deficit (NZ TCS)

Scientific classification
- Kingdom: Animalia
- Phylum: Arthropoda
- Clade: Pancrustacea
- Class: Insecta
- Order: Lepidoptera
- Family: Tineidae
- Genus: Bascantis; Meyrick, 1914
- Species: B. sirenica

Binomial name
- Bascantis sirenica Meyrick, 1914

Genus of moths

Bascantis is a genus of moths belonging to the family Tineidae. It contains only one species, Bascantis sirenica, that is endemic to New Zealand. In 2025 this species was classified as "Data Deficient" by the Department of Conservation.

== Taxonomy ==
This species was described by Edward Meyrick in 1914 using a specimen collected by George Hudson at Kaeo in January. Hudson discussed and illustrated this species both in his 1928 book The Butterflies and Moths of New Zealand as well as his 1950 publication Fragments of New Zealand entomology. The holotype specimen is held at the Natural History Museum, London.

== Description ==
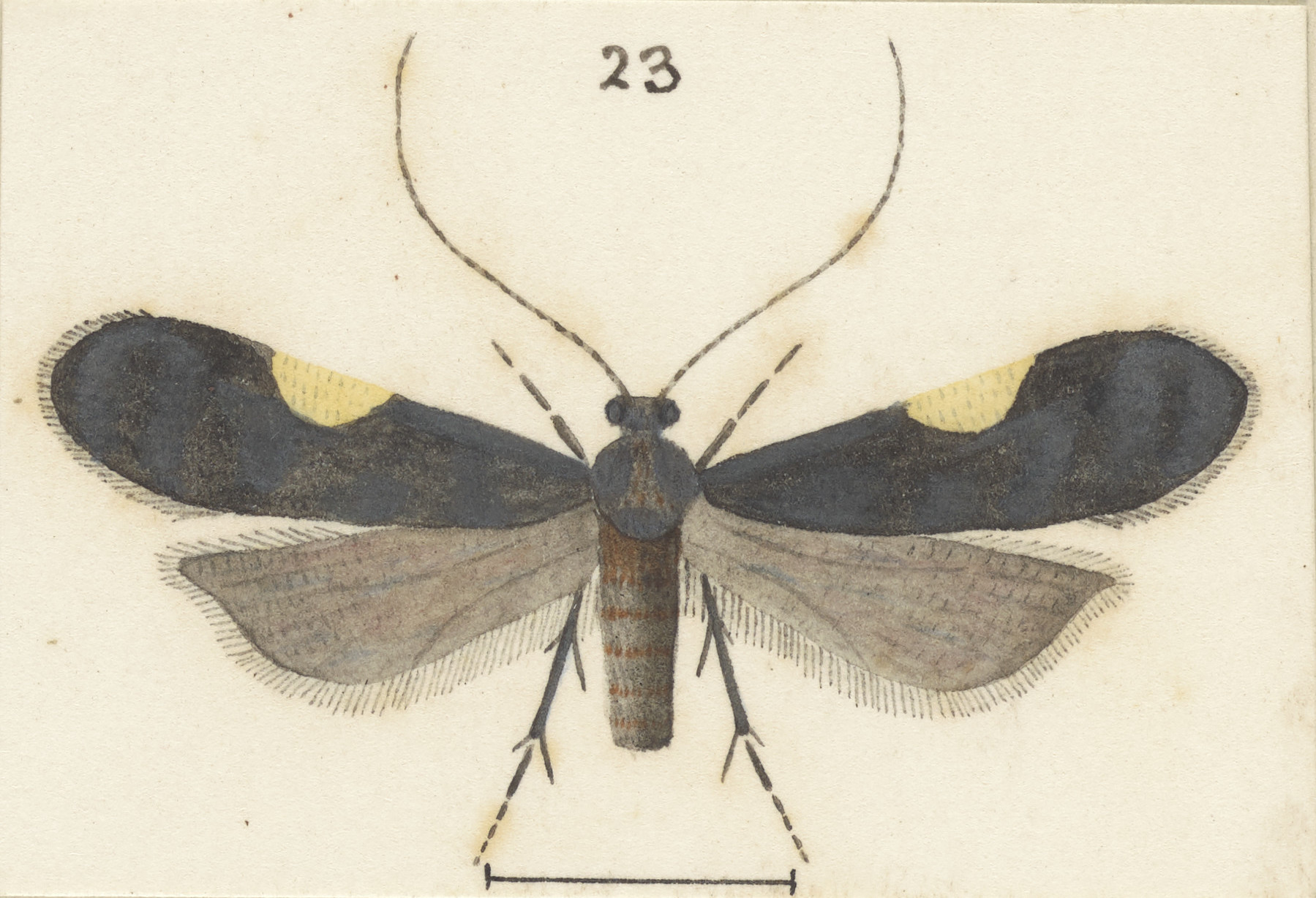
Illustration by Hudson.

Live specimen observed at night on the underside of a Coprosma grandifolia leaf.

Meyrick described the species as follows:

♀︎. 12 mm. Head and thorax deep purple, face whitish. Palpi dark fuscous. Antennae violet - fuscous. Abdomen dark bluish - grey. Forewings elongate, rather narrow, posteriorly slightly dilated, costa anteriorly slightly, towards apex strongly arched, apex obtuse, termen obliquely rounded; deep purple; a semioval ochreous-white spot on middle of costa, reaching 1/3 across wing; dorsum obscurely marked with several small blue- metallic spots and minute whitish dots; a transverse-linear blackish mark in disc at 3/4; a narrow bright-purple transverse fascia shot with metallic-blue and edged anteriorly with indistinct white dots from beyond 3/4 of costa to tornus, and another before apex : cilia dark grey, with blackish median line. Hindwings dark bronzy-fuscous, lighter anteriorly; cilia dark grey.

== Distribution ==
This species is endemic to New Zealand. Along with the type locality of Kaeo, this species has also been collected in Waitākere Ranges, Days Bay, and Wainuiomata. Prior to it being observed in February 2026 this species was last seen in 1950.

== Biology and behaviour ==
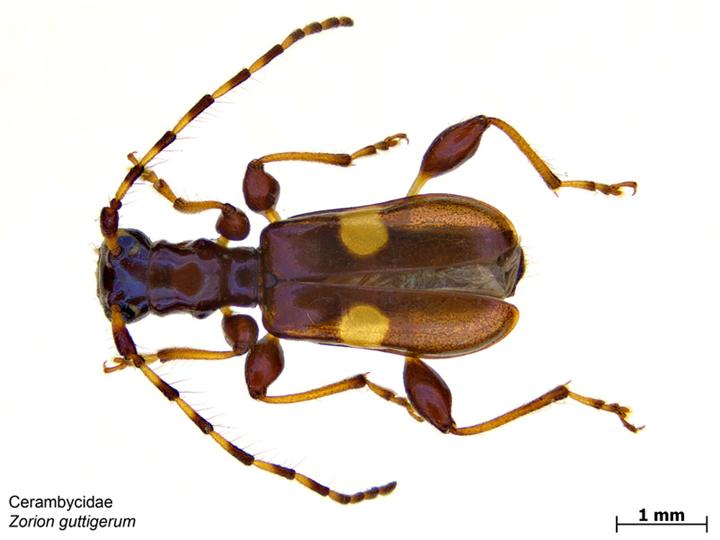
Zorion guttigerum

The adult moth is on the wing in January. It is a day flying moth. It has been hypothesised that this moth mimics the appearance of the beetle Zorion guttigerum.

== Host species and habitat ==
This species has been collected by sweeping in dense forest.

== Conservation status ==
In 2025 B. sirenica was classified by the New Zealand Department of Conservation as "data deficient" under the New Zealand Threat Classification System. This species is regarded as being biologically sparse and range restricted.
