= Antipolistes =

Scientific classification
- Kingdom: Animalia
- Phylum: Arthropoda
- Clade: Pancrustacea
- Class: Insecta
- Order: Lepidoptera
- Family: Tineidae
- Genus: Antipolistes; Forbes, 1933

Genus of moths

Antipolistes is a genus of moths belonging to the family Tineidae.

The larvae are scavangers/predators in nests of Polistes sp. (wasps)

== Species ==
- Antipolistes anthracella Forbes, 1933 (from Cuba, Puerto Rico, Trinidad, Brazil)
- Antipolistes latebrivora (Meyrick, 1935)
