= Dolerothera =

Scientific classification
- Kingdom: Animalia
- Phylum: Arthropoda
- Clade: Pancrustacea
- Class: Insecta
- Order: Lepidoptera
- Family: Tineidae
- Genus: Dolerothera; Meyrick, 1918

Genus of moths

Dolerothera is a genus of moths belonging to the family Tineidae.

== Species ==
- Dolerothera amphiplecta Meyrick, 1918
- Dolerothera theodora Meyrick, 1926
