= Organodesma =

Scientific classification
- Kingdom: Animalia
- Phylum: Arthropoda
- Clade: Pancrustacea
- Class: Insecta
- Order: Lepidoptera
- Family: Tineidae
- Subfamily: Siloscinae
- Genus: Organodesma; Gozmány, 1965

Type species
- Hapsifera arsiptila Meyrick, 1931

Genus of moths

Organodesma is a genus of moths belonging to the family Tineidae. The genus was described in 1965 by Hungarian entomologist László Anthony Gozmány.

== Species ==
- Organodesma arsiptila (Meyrick, 1931) (Cameroon, Congo)
- Organodesma aurocrata Gozmány, 1976 (Congo)
- Organodesma erinacea (Walker, 1863) (South Africa, Zambia)
- Organodesma heptazona (Meyrick, 1931) (Sierra Leone)
- Organodesma leucomicra (Gozmány, 1966) (Ghana, Uganda)
- Organodesma merui Gozmány, 1969 (Tanzania)
- Organodesma onomasta Gozmány & Vári, 1975 (Tanzania, Zambia)
- Organodesma optata Gozmány, 1967 (Congo)
- Organodesma ornata Gozmány, 1966
- Organodesma petaloxantha (Meyrick, 1931) (Cameroon, Congo, Zambia)
- Organodesma psapharogma (Meyrick, 1936) (Congo)
- Organodesma simplex Gozmány, 1967 (Congo)
