= Nesophylacella =

Scientific classification
- Kingdom: Animalia
- Phylum: Arthropoda
- Clade: Pancrustacea
- Class: Insecta
- Order: Lepidoptera
- Family: Tineidae
- Genus: Nesophylacella; T.B. Fletcher, 1940
- Species: N. xanthoschema

Binomial name
- Nesophylacella xanthoschema (Meyrick, 1926)

Synonyms
- Genus: Nesophylax Meyrick, 1926; Species: Nesophylax xanthoschema Meyrick, 1926

Genus of moths

Nesophylacella is a genus of moths belonging to the family Tineidae. It contains only one species, Nesophylacella xanthoschema, which is found in New Guinea.
