= Hyalaula =

Scientific classification
- Kingdom: Animalia
- Phylum: Arthropoda
- Clade: Pancrustacea
- Class: Insecta
- Order: Lepidoptera
- Family: Tineidae
- Genus: Hyalaula; Diakonoff, 1955
- Species: H. apatelia

Binomial name
- Hyalaula apatelia Diakonoff, 1955

Genus of moths

Hyalaula is a genus of moths belonging to the family Tineidae. It contains only one species, Hyalaula apatelia, which is found in New Guinea.
