= Panthytarcha =

Scientific classification
- Kingdom: Animalia
- Phylum: Arthropoda
- Clade: Pancrustacea
- Class: Insecta
- Order: Lepidoptera
- Family: Tineidae
- Genus: Panthytarcha; Meyrick, 1922
- Species: P. astrocharis

Binomial name
- Panthytarcha astrocharis Meyrick, 1922

Genus of moths

Panthytarcha is a genus of moths belonging to the family Tineidae. It contains only one species, Panthytarcha astrocharis, which is found in Brazil.
