= Plemyristis =

Scientific classification
- Kingdom: Animalia
- Phylum: Arthropoda
- Clade: Pancrustacea
- Class: Insecta
- Order: Lepidoptera
- Family: Tineidae
- Genus: Plemyristis; Meyrick, 1915
- Species: P. aphrochoa

Binomial name
- Plemyristis aphrochoa Meyrick, 1915

Genus of moths

Plemyristis is a genus of moths belonging to the family Tineidae. It contains only one species, Plemyristis aphrochoa, which is found in India.
