= Cryphiotechna =

Scientific classification
- Kingdom: Animalia
- Phylum: Arthropoda
- Clade: Pancrustacea
- Class: Insecta
- Order: Lepidoptera
- Family: Tineidae
- Genus: Cryphiotechna; Meyrick, 1932
- Species: C. ochracma

Binomial name
- Cryphiotechna ochracma Meyrick, 1932

Genus of moths

Cryphiotechna is a genus of moths belonging to the family Tineidae. It contains only one species, Cryphiotechna ochracma, which is found in Peru.
