= Reisserita =

Scientific classification
- Kingdom: Animalia
- Phylum: Arthropoda
- Clade: Pancrustacea
- Class: Insecta
- Order: Lepidoptera
- Family: Tineidae
- Subfamily: Tineinae
- Genus: Reisserita; Agenjo, 1952

Genus of moths

Reisserita is a genus of moths belonging to the family Tineidae.

All species are unicolorous, without any markings on the forewings.

== Species ==
- Reisserita arabica (Petersen, 1961) (Saudi Arabia)
- Reisserita bettagi Gaedike, 2009 (Moroccos)
- Reisserita chalcopterella (Zerny, 1935) (Moroccos)
- Reisserita chrysopterella (Herrich-Schäffer, 1854)
- Reisserita cinnamomella Gaedike, 2015 (Moroccos)
- Reisserita haasi (Rebel, 1901)
- Reisserita karsholti Gaedike, 2009 (Moroccos)
- Reisserita latiusculella (Stainton, 1867) (Turkey, Lebanon, Israel, Cyprus)
- Reisserita leucella (Turati, 1926) (from Libya)
- Reisserita luteopterella Petersen, 1957 (Moroccos)
- Reisserita mauritanica (Baker, 1885) (Algeria, Tunisia, Malta)
- Reisserita meyi Gaedike, 2015 (Moroccos)
- Reisserita oranella (Petersen, 1957)
- Reisserita panormitanella (Mann, 1859) (Algeria, Tunisia, Sicilia, Sardinia)
- Reisserita parva Petersen & Gaedike, 1979 (Moroccos, Spain)
- Reisserita relicinella Zeller, 1839
- Reisserita stengeli Gaedike, 2009 (Moroccos)
- Reisserita zernyi Petersen, 1957
- Reisserita zouhari Gaedike, 2009 (from Egypt)

== Former species ==
- Anomalotinea pseudoranella (Petersen & Gaedike, 1979)
