= Kangerosithyris =

Scientific classification
- Kingdom: Animalia
- Phylum: Arthropoda
- Clade: Pancrustacea
- Class: Insecta
- Order: Lepidoptera
- Family: Tineidae
- Subfamily: Tineinae
- Genus: Kangerosithyris; Skalski, 1992

Genus of moths

Kangerosithyris is a genus of moths belonging to the family Tineidae.

There is presently only one species in this genus: Kangerosithyris kotomsarensis Skalski, 1992 that is a cave-dwelling moth and is known from India.
