= Stryphnodes =

Scientific classification
- Kingdom: Animalia
- Phylum: Arthropoda
- Clade: Pancrustacea
- Class: Insecta
- Order: Lepidoptera
- Family: Tineidae
- Genus: Stryphnodes; Meyrick, 1919
- Species: S. styracopa

Binomial name
- Stryphnodes styracopa Meyrick, 1919

Genus of moths

Stryphnodes is a moth genus, belonging to the family Tineidae. It contains only one species, Stryphnodes styracopa, which is found in Sri Lanka.
