= Ancystrocheira =

Scientific classification
- Kingdom: Animalia
- Phylum: Arthropoda
- Clade: Pancrustacea
- Class: Insecta
- Order: Lepidoptera
- Family: Tineidae
- Genus: Ancystrocheira; Gozmány, 1969
- Species: A. porphyrica

Binomial name
- Ancystrocheira porphyrica Gozmány, 1969

Genus of moths

Ancystrocheira is a genus of moths belonging to the family Tineidae. It contains only one species, Ancystrocheira porphyrica, which is found on Madagascar.
