= Catapsilothrix =

Scientific classification
- Kingdom: Animalia
- Phylum: Arthropoda
- Clade: Pancrustacea
- Class: Insecta
- Order: Lepidoptera
- Family: Tineidae
- Genus: Catapsilothrix; Rebel, 1909

Genus of moths

Catapsilothrix is a genus of moths belonging to the family Tineidae.

== Species ==
- Catapsilothrix goetschmanni Rebel, 1911
- Catapsilothrix klaptoczi Rebel, 1909
