= Ceratobia =

Scientific classification
- Kingdom: Animalia
- Phylum: Arthropoda
- Clade: Pancrustacea
- Class: Insecta
- Order: Lepidoptera
- Family: Tineidae
- Subfamily: Tineinae
- Genus: Ceratobia; Zagulajev, 1974

Type species
- Ceratobia adzharica Zagulajev, 1974

Species
- 5, see text

Genus of moths

Ceratobia is a small genus of the fungus moth family, Tineidae. Therein, it belongs to the subfamily Tineinae.

Only five species are presently contained in this genus:

- Ceratobia adzharica Zagulajev, 1974
- Ceratobia hemiphracta (Meyrick, 1926)
- Ceratobia irakella (Petersen, 1959)
- Ceratobia kintrishica Zagulajev, 1974
- Ceratobia oxymora (Meyrick, 1919)
- Ceratobia ratjadae Passerin, 1978
- Ceratobia sudanica Gaedike, 2014
