= Trachyrrhopala =

Scientific classification
- Kingdom: Animalia
- Phylum: Arthropoda
- Clade: Pancrustacea
- Class: Insecta
- Order: Lepidoptera
- Family: Tineidae
- Genus: Trachyrrhopala; Meyrick, 1926
- Species: T. pauroleuca

Binomial name
- Trachyrrhopala pauroleuca Meyrick, 1926

Genus of moths

Trachyrrhopala is a genus of moths belonging to the family Tineidae. It contains only one species, Trachyrrhopala pauroleuca, which is found on the island of Borneo.
