= Transmixta =

Scientific classification
- Kingdom: Animalia
- Phylum: Arthropoda
- Clade: Pancrustacea
- Class: Insecta
- Order: Lepidoptera
- Family: Tineidae
- Genus: Transmixta; Gozmány & Vári, 1973
- Species: T. fortuita

Binomial name
- Transmixta fortuita (Meyrick, 1920)

Synonyms
- Tinea fortuita Meyrick, 1920

Genus of moths

Transmixta is a genus of moths belonging to the family Tineidae. It consists of only one species, Transmixta fortuita, which is found in South Africa.
