= Brachydoxa =

Scientific classification
- Kingdom: Animalia
- Phylum: Arthropoda
- Clade: Pancrustacea
- Class: Insecta
- Order: Lepidoptera
- Family: Tineidae
- Subfamily: Dryadaulinae
- Genus: Brachydoxa; Meyrick, 1917

Synonyms
- Asyndetaula Meyrick, 1919

Genus of moths

Brachydoxa are a genus of moths, belonging to the family Tineidae.

== Species ==
- Brachydoxa syntrocha Meyrick, 1917
- Brachydoxa vagula (Meyrick, 1919)
