= Otochares =

Scientific classification
- Kingdom: Animalia
- Phylum: Arthropoda
- Clade: Pancrustacea
- Class: Insecta
- Order: Lepidoptera
- Family: Tineidae
- Genus: Otochares; Meyrick, 1919

Genus of moths

Otochares is a genus of moths belonging to the family Tineidae.

== Species ==
- Otochares gypsopa Meyrick, 1919
- Otochares peronacma Meyrick, 1919
