= Orocrypsona =

Scientific classification
- Kingdom: Animalia
- Phylum: Arthropoda
- Clade: Pancrustacea
- Class: Insecta
- Order: Lepidoptera
- Family: Tineidae
- Genus: Orocrypsona; Gozmány, 2004

Genus of moths

Orocrypsona is a genus of moths belonging to the family Tineidae.

== Species ==
- Orocrypsona periacantha Gozmány, 2004
- Orocrypsona punctirama Gozmány, 2004
- Orocrypsona rhypala Gozmány, 2004
