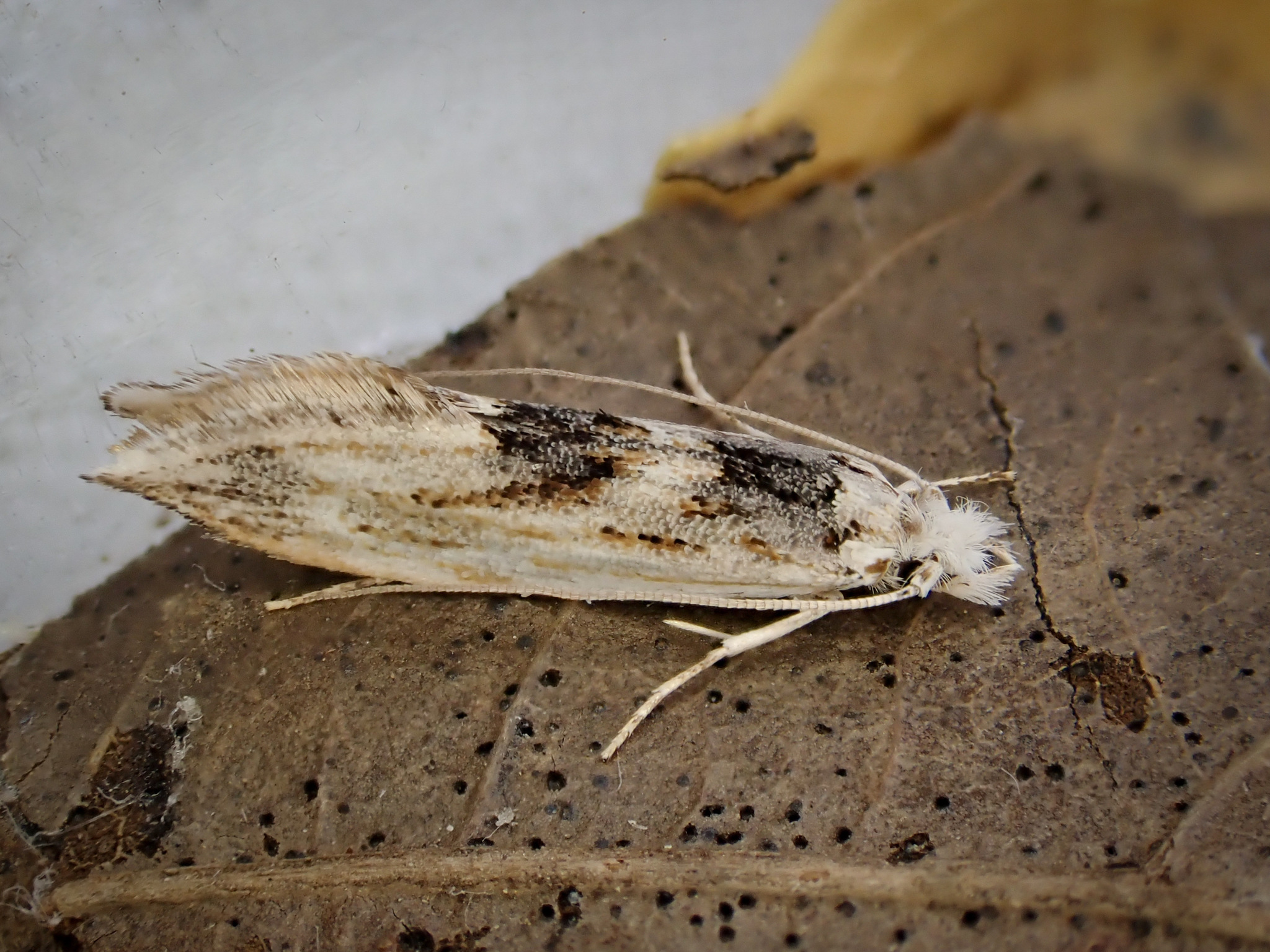
- Tephrosara cimmeria

Scientific classification
- Kingdom: Animalia
- Phylum: Arthropoda
- Clade: Pancrustacea
- Class: Insecta
- Order: Lepidoptera
- Family: Tineidae
- Genus: Tephrosara; Meyrick, 1915
- Species: T. cimmeria

Binomial name
- Tephrosara cimmeria (Meyrick, 1914)

Synonyms
- Erechthias cimmeria Meyrick, 1914

= Tephrosara =

Genus of moths

Tephrosara is a genus of moths belonging to the family Tineidae. It contains only one species, Tephrosara cimmeria, which is endemic to New Zealand.

== Description of species ==
The wingspan is 14–15 mm. The forewings are elongate and rather dark grey. The tips of the scales are whitish and there are two ochreous-brown longitudinal lines. The hindwings are dark fuscous.
