= Homalopsycha =

Scientific classification
- Kingdom: Animalia
- Phylum: Arthropoda
- Clade: Pancrustacea
- Class: Insecta
- Order: Lepidoptera
- Family: Tineidae
- Subfamily: Myrmecozelinae
- Genus: Homalopsycha; Meyrick, 1920

Genus of moths

Homalopsycha is a genus of moths belonging to the family Tineidae.

== Species ==
- Homalopsycha pericharacta Meyrick, 1924
- Homalopsycha rapida (Meyrick, 1909) (=Homalopsycha aestuaria Meyrick, 1920)
