= Marmaroxena =

Scientific classification
- Kingdom: Animalia
- Phylum: Arthropoda
- Clade: Pancrustacea
- Class: Insecta
- Order: Lepidoptera
- Family: Tineidae
- Genus: Marmaroxena; Meyrick, 1927
- Species: M. autochalca

Binomial name
- Marmaroxena autochalca Meyrick, 1927

Genus of moths

Marmaroxena is a genus of moths belonging to the family Tineidae. It contains only one species, Marmaroxena autochalca, which is found on Samoa.
