= Nothogenes =

Scientific classification
- Kingdom: Animalia
- Phylum: Arthropoda
- Clade: Pancrustacea
- Class: Insecta
- Order: Lepidoptera
- Family: Tineidae
- Genus: Nothogenes; Meyrick, 1932

Genus of moths

Nothogenes is a genus of moths belonging to the family Tineidae.

== Species ==
- Nothogenes citrocrana Meyrick, 1932
- Nothogenes oxystoma Meyrick, 1938
