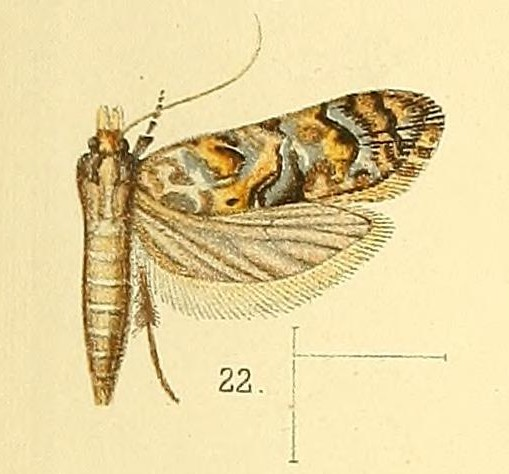
- Autochthonus chalybiellus

Scientific classification
- Kingdom: Animalia
- Phylum: Arthropoda
- Clade: Pancrustacea
- Class: Insecta
- Order: Lepidoptera
- Family: Tineidae
- Subfamily: Siloscinae; Gozmány, 1968

= Siloscinae =

Subfamily of moths

The Siloscinae are a subfamily of moth of the family Tineidae. The subfamily was described by Hungarian entomologist László Anthony Gozmány in 1968.

Most species of this subfamily are found in the Afrotropical region, but one species was described from China.

== Genera ==
- Autochthonus Walsingham, 1891
- Organodesma Gozmány, 1965
- Silosca Gozmány, 1965
