= Nonischnoscia =

Scientific classification
- Kingdom: Animalia
- Phylum: Arthropoda
- Clade: Pancrustacea
- Class: Insecta
- Order: Lepidoptera
- Family: Tineidae
- Genus: Nonischnoscia; Zagulajev, 1979
- Species: N. umbraticostella

Binomial name
- Nonischnoscia umbraticostella (Walsingham, 1897)

Synonyms
- Tinea umbraticostella Walsingham, 1897

Genus of moths

Nonischnoscia is a genus of moths belonging to the family Tineidae. It contains only one species, Nonischnoscia umbraticostella, which is found in the West Indies.
