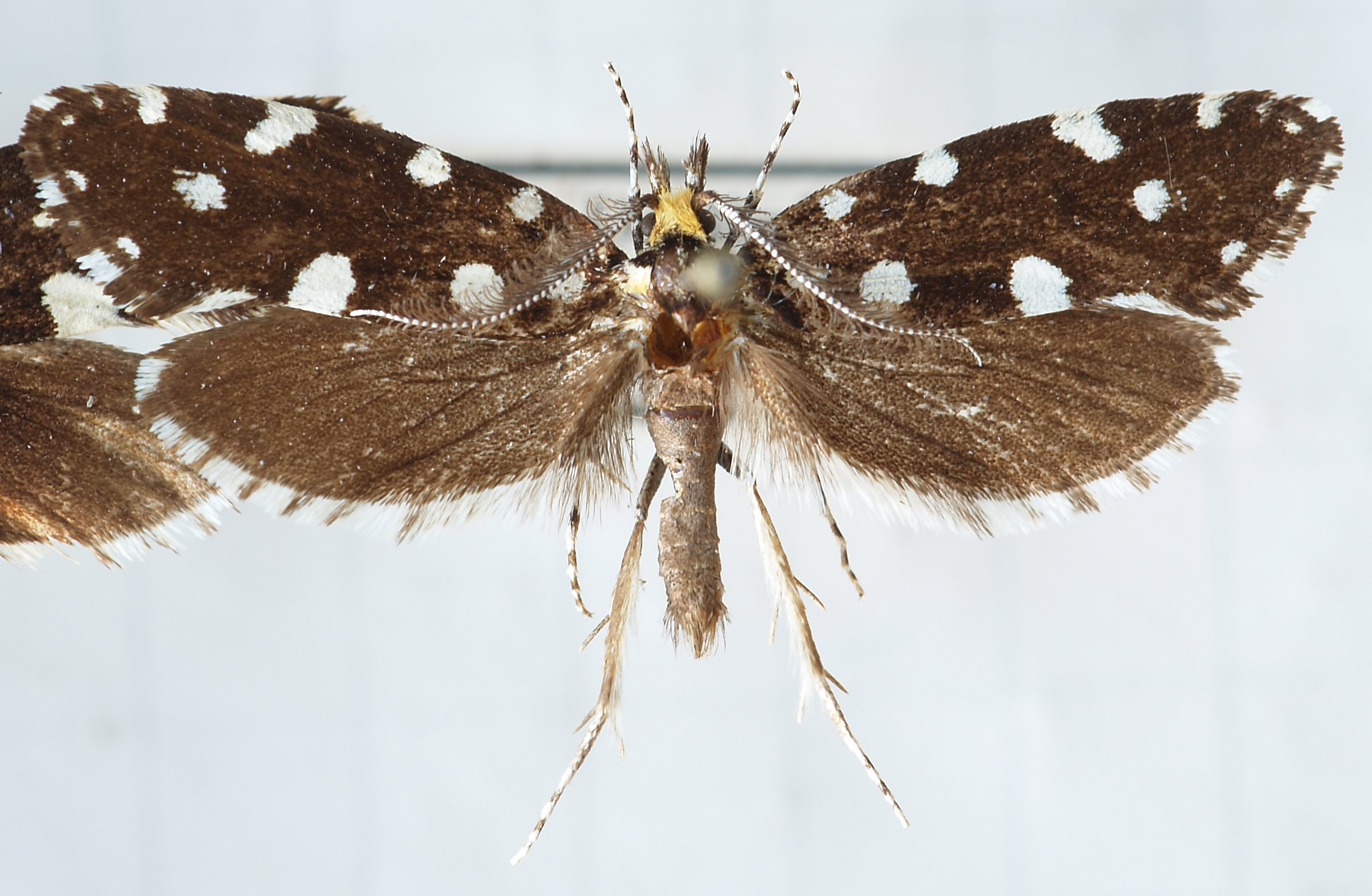

Scientific classification
- Kingdom: Animalia
- Phylum: Arthropoda
- Class: Insecta
- Order: Lepidoptera
- Family: Tineidae
- Subfamily: Euplocaminae
- Genus: Euplocamus; Latreille, 1809

= Euplocamus =

Genus of moths

Euplocamus is a genus of moths in the family Tineidae. The genus was erected by Pierre André Latreille in 1809.

The genus includes:

- Euplocamus anthracinalis (Scopoli, 1763)
- Euplocamus cirriger Philippi, 1839 (taxon inquirendum)
- Euplocamus ophisa (Cramer, 1779)

== Obsolete usage ==
Euplocamus is also an old name for a genus of pheasants, subsequently subsumed first by Gennceus, and then by Lophura.
