= Asymphyla =

Scientific classification
- Kingdom: Animalia
- Phylum: Arthropoda
- Clade: Pancrustacea
- Class: Insecta
- Order: Lepidoptera
- Family: Tineidae
- Subfamily: Tineinae
- Genus: Asymphyla; Gozmány & Vári, 1973

Type species
- Tinea asperata Meyrick, 1918

Genus of moths

Asymphyla is a genus of moths belonging to the family Tineidae. The genus was erected by László Anthony Gozmány and Lajos Vári in 1973.
