= Mythoplastis =

Scientific classification
- Kingdom: Animalia
- Phylum: Arthropoda
- Clade: Pancrustacea
- Class: Insecta
- Order: Lepidoptera
- Family: Tineidae
- Genus: Mythoplastis; Meyrick, 1919

Genus of moths

Mythoplastis is a genus of moths belonging to the family Tineidae.

== Species ==
- Mythoplastis chalcochra Meyrick, 1931
- Mythoplastis exanthes (Meyrick, 1919)
