= Hilaroptera =

Scientific classification
- Kingdom: Animalia
- Phylum: Arthropoda
- Clade: Pancrustacea
- Class: Insecta
- Order: Lepidoptera
- Family: Tineidae
- Subfamily: Scardiinae
- Genus: Hilaroptera; Gozmany, 1969
- Species: H. viettei

Binomial name
- Hilaroptera viettei Gozmány, 1969

Genus of moths

Hilaroptera is a genus of moths belonging to the family Tineidae. It contains only one species, Hilaroptera viettei, which is found in Madagascar.

This species has a wingspan of 22-28mm, forewings are shiny whitish stramineous with brownish black pattern situated on the upper side of the wing. Many dark dots along costa.
