= Rungsiodes =

Scientific classification
- Kingdom: Animalia
- Phylum: Arthropoda
- Clade: Pancrustacea
- Class: Insecta
- Order: Lepidoptera
- Family: Tineidae
- Genus: Rungsiodes; Amsel, 1953
- Species: R. stenopterella

Binomial name
- Rungsiodes stenopterella Amsel, 1953

Genus of moth

Rungsiodes is a genus of moths belonging to the family Tineidae. It contains only one species, Rungsiodes stenopterella, which is found in Morocco.
