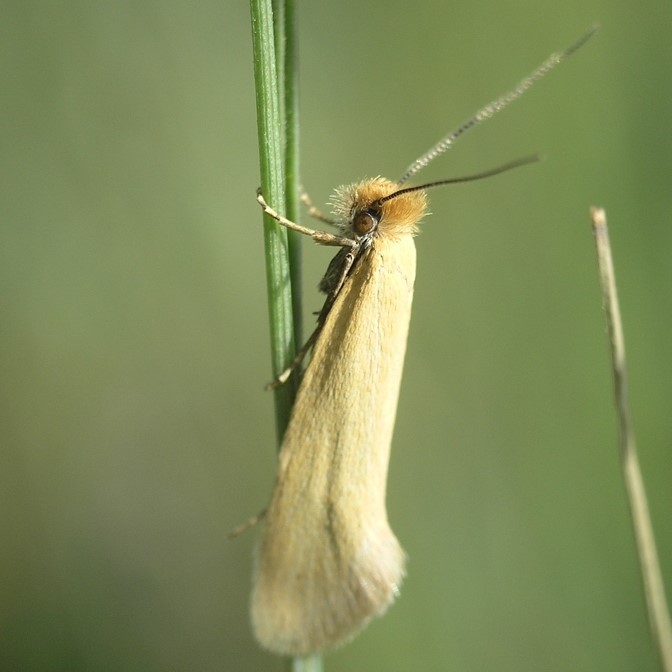
- Ceratuncus danubiella

Scientific classification
- Kingdom: Animalia
- Phylum: Arthropoda
- Clade: Pancrustacea
- Class: Insecta
- Order: Lepidoptera
- Family: Tineidae
- Subfamily: Tineinae
- Genus: Ceratuncus; Petersen, 1957

= Ceratuncus =

Genus of moths

Ceratuncus is a genus of moths in the family Tineidae.

== Species ==
The following species are recognised in the genus Ceratuncus:

- Ceratuncus affinitella (Rebel, 1901)
- Ceratuncus danubiella (Mann, 1866)
- Ceratuncus dzhungaricus Zagulajev, 1971
- Ceratuncus maroccanella (Amsel, 1952)
