= Lepyrotica =

Scientific classification
- Kingdom: Animalia
- Phylum: Arthropoda
- Clade: Pancrustacea
- Class: Insecta
- Order: Lepidoptera
- Family: Tineidae
- Genus: Lepyrotica; Meyrick, 1921

Genus of moths

Lepyrotica is a genus of moths, belonging to the family Tineidae.

== Species ==
- Lepyrotica acantha Davis, 1994
- Lepyrotica brevistrigata (Walsingham, 1897)
- Lepyrotica delotoma (Meyrick, 1919)
- Lepyrotica diluticornis (Walsingham, 1897) (=Tinea scythropiella Walsingham, 1897)
- Lepyrotica fragilella (Walsingham, 1897)
- Lepyrotica reduplicata (Walsingham, 1897)
- Lepyrotica scardamyctis Meyrick, 1921
