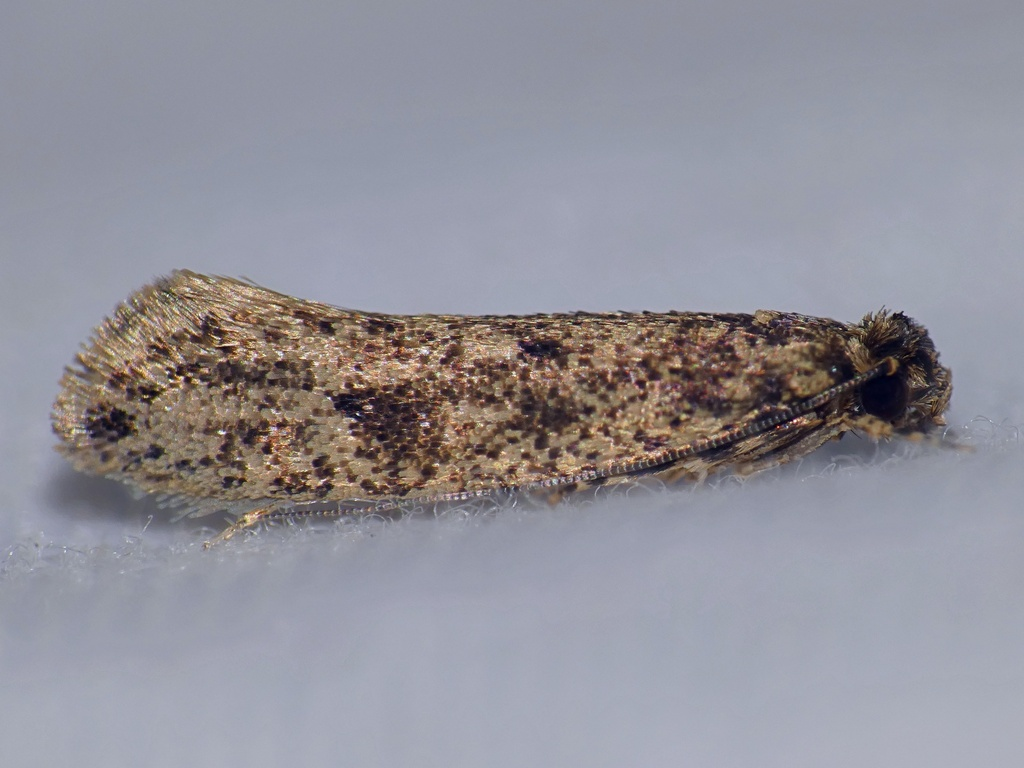

Scientific classification
- Kingdom: Animalia
- Phylum: Arthropoda
- Clade: Pancrustacea
- Class: Insecta
- Order: Lepidoptera
- Family: Tineidae
- Subfamily: Tineinae
- Genus: Praeacedes; Amsel, 1954
- Species: P. atomosella

Binomial name
- Praeacedes atomosella (Walker, 1863)

Synonyms
- Genus: Antitinea Amsel, 1955; Titaenoses Hinton & Bradley, 1956; Species: Tinea atomosella Walker, 1863; Tinea decui Capuse & Georgescu, 1977; Antitinea deluccae Amsel, 1955; Praeacedes deluccae; Tinea despecta Meyrick, 1919; Tinea malgassica Gozmány, 1970; Tinea seminolella Beutenmüller, 1889; Tinea thecophora Walsingham, 1908; Praeacedes thecophora; Titaenoses thecophora

= Praeacedes =

Genus of moths

Praeacedes is a monotypic moth genus in the family Tineidae first described by Hans Georg Amsel in 1954. Its only species, Praeacedes atomosella, was first described by Francis Walker in 1863. It has a wide range and has been recorded from Europe (the Canary Islands, Cyprus and Malta), Australia, Hawaii, India, Malaysia, Solomon Islands, Easter Island, Mauritius, Madagascar, Réunion, South America and North America. The species has commonly been misidentified in various parts of the world.
