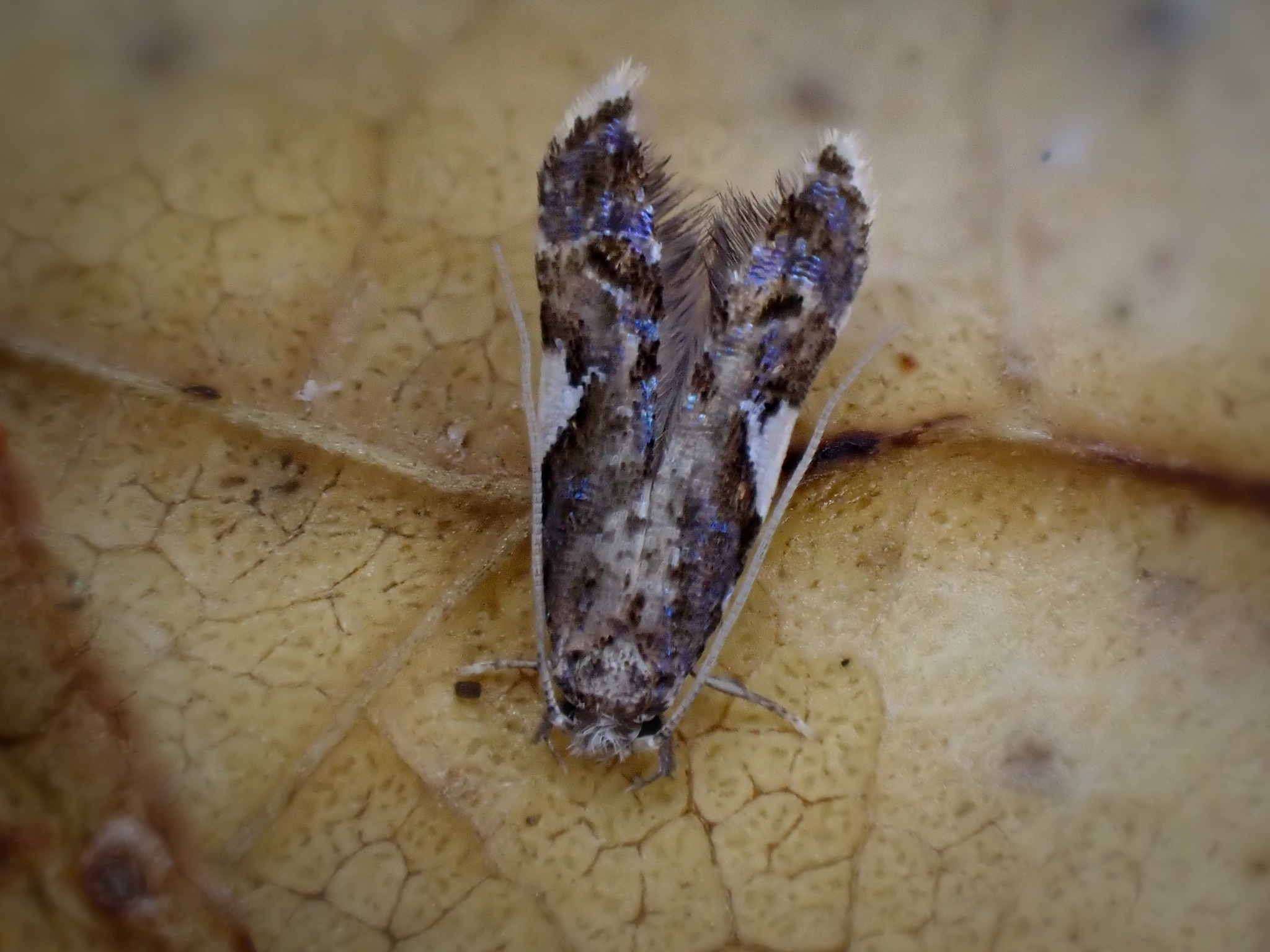
- Habrophila compseuta

Scientific classification
- Kingdom: Animalia
- Phylum: Arthropoda
- Clade: Pancrustacea
- Class: Insecta
- Order: Lepidoptera
- Family: Tineidae
- Genus: Habrophila; Meyrick, 1889
- Species: H. compseuta

Binomial name
- Habrophila compseuta Meyrick, 1889

= Habrophila =

Genus of moths

Habrophila is a genus of moths belonging to the family Tineidae. This genus was described by Edward Meyrick in 1889. It consists of only one species, Habrophila compseuta, which is endemic to New Zealand.

== Description of species ==
The wingspan is 11 mm. The forewings are very elongate and whitish-ochreous, suffusedly irrorated with dark fuscous, but less towards the base. The hindwings are whitish-grey.
