= Minicorona =

Scientific classification
- Kingdom: Animalia
- Phylum: Arthropoda
- Clade: Pancrustacea
- Class: Insecta
- Order: Lepidoptera
- Family: Tineidae
- Subfamily: Myrmecozelinae
- Genus: Minicorona; Gozmány & Vári, 1973
- Species: M. tricarpa

Binomial name
- Minicorona tricarpa (Meyrick, 1913)

Synonyms
- Demobrotis tricarpa Meyrick, 1913

Genus of moths

Minicorona is a genus of moths belonging to the family Tineidae. It contains only one species, Minicorona tricarpa, which is found in South Africa.
