= Ochetoxena =

Scientific classification
- Kingdom: Animalia
- Phylum: Arthropoda
- Clade: Pancrustacea
- Class: Insecta
- Order: Lepidoptera
- Family: Tineidae
- Subfamily: Myrmecozelinae
- Genus: Ochetoxena; Meyrick, 1920
- Species: O. phaneraula

Binomial name
- Ochetoxena phaneraula Meyrick, 1920

Genus of moths

Ochetoxena is a genus of moths belonging to the family Tineidae. It contains only one species, Ochetoxena phaneraula, which is found in South Africa.
