= Cubotinea =

Scientific classification
- Kingdom: Animalia
- Phylum: Arthropoda
- Clade: Pancrustacea
- Class: Insecta
- Order: Lepidoptera
- Family: Tineidae
- Genus: Cubotinea; Capuse & Georgesco, 1977
- Species: C. orghidani

Binomial name
- Cubotinea orghidani Capuse & Georgescu, 1977

Genus of moths

Cubotinea is a genus of moths belonging to the family Tineidae. It contains only one species, Cubotinea orghidani, which is found on Cuba.
