= Harmotona =

Scientific classification
- Kingdom: Animalia
- Phylum: Arthropoda
- Clade: Pancrustacea
- Class: Insecta
- Order: Lepidoptera
- Family: Tineidae
- Genus: Harmotona; Meyrick, 1919
- Species: H. diplochorda

Binomial name
- Harmotona diplochorda Meyrick, 1919

Genus of moths

Harmotona is a genus of moths belonging to the family Tineidae. It contains only one species, Harmotona diplochorda, which is found in India.

The wingspan is about 9 mm. The forewings are elongate and light grey, partially tinged with whitish, although they are tinged brownish towards the apex. The hindwings are grey.
