= Ephedroxena =

Scientific classification
- Kingdom: Animalia
- Phylum: Arthropoda
- Clade: Pancrustacea
- Class: Insecta
- Order: Lepidoptera
- Family: Tineidae
- Genus: Ephedroxena; Meyrick, 1919
- Species: E. incisoria

Binomial name
- Ephedroxena incisoria Meyrick, 1919

Genus of moths

Ephedroxena is a genus of moths belonging to the family Tineidae. It contains only one species, Ephedroxena incisoria, which is found in Guyana.

The wingspan is 8–9 mm. The head is light brassy-grey. The forewings are elongate and purplish-fuscous suffusedly mixed with dark fuscous. The hindwings are brassy-grey.
