= Gourbia =

Scientific classification
- Kingdom: Animalia
- Phylum: Arthropoda
- Clade: Pancrustacea
- Class: Insecta
- Order: Lepidoptera
- Family: Tineidae
- Genus: Gourbia; Chrétien, 1900
- Species: G. staphylinella

Binomial name
- Gourbia staphylinella Chrétien, 1900

Genus of moths

Gourbia is a genus of moths belonging to the family Tineidae. It contains only one species, Gourbia staphylinella, which is found in Tunisia.
