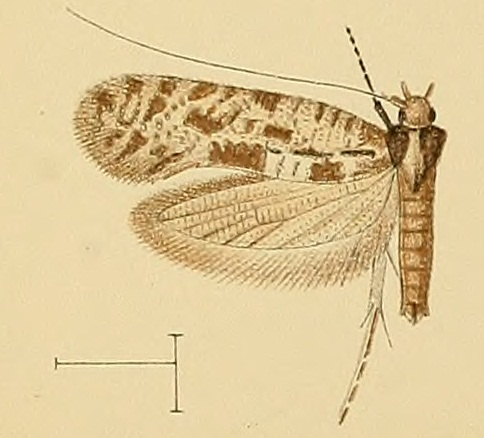

Scientific classification
- Kingdom: Animalia
- Phylum: Arthropoda
- Clade: Pancrustacea
- Class: Insecta
- Order: Lepidoptera
- Family: Tineidae
- Subfamily: Stathmopolitinae; Walsingham, 1908
- Genus: Stathmopolitis; Walsingham, 1908
- Species: S. tragocoprella

Binomial name
- Stathmopolitis tragocoprella Walsingham, 1908

= Stathmopolitis =

Genus of moths

Stathmopolitis is a genus of moths belonging to the family Tineidae. It is the only genus of the Stathmopolitinae subfamily and contains only one species, Stathmopolitis tragocoprella, which is found on the Canary Islands.

The wingspan is 12–20 mm. The forewings are pale fawn, mottled with dark fuscous. The hindwings are pale greyish fuscous.

The larvae have been recorded feeding in old pellets of goats' dung. They are semitransparent ivory white, with a pale yellowish brown head.
