= Acritotilpha =

Scientific classification
- Kingdom: Animalia
- Phylum: Arthropoda
- Clade: Pancrustacea
- Class: Insecta
- Order: Lepidoptera
- Family: Tineidae
- Genus: Acritotilpha; Zerny, 1935
- Species: A. siliginella

Binomial name
- Acritotilpha siliginella Zerny, 1935

Genus of moths

Acritotilpha is a genus of moths belonging to the family Tineidae. It contains only one species, Acritotilpha siliginella, which is found in Morocco.
