= Amathyntis =

Scientific classification
- Kingdom: Animalia
- Phylum: Arthropoda
- Clade: Pancrustacea
- Class: Insecta
- Order: Lepidoptera
- Family: Tineidae
- Genus: Amathyntis; Meyrick, 1907

Genus of moths

Amathyntis is a genus of moths belonging to the family Tineidae.

== Species ==
- Amathyntis athyra Meyrick, 1911
- Amathyntis catharopa Meyrick, 1911
- Amathyntis nucleolata Meyrick, 1911
- Amathyntis oporina Meyrick, 1911
- Amathyntis physatma Meyrick, 1907
