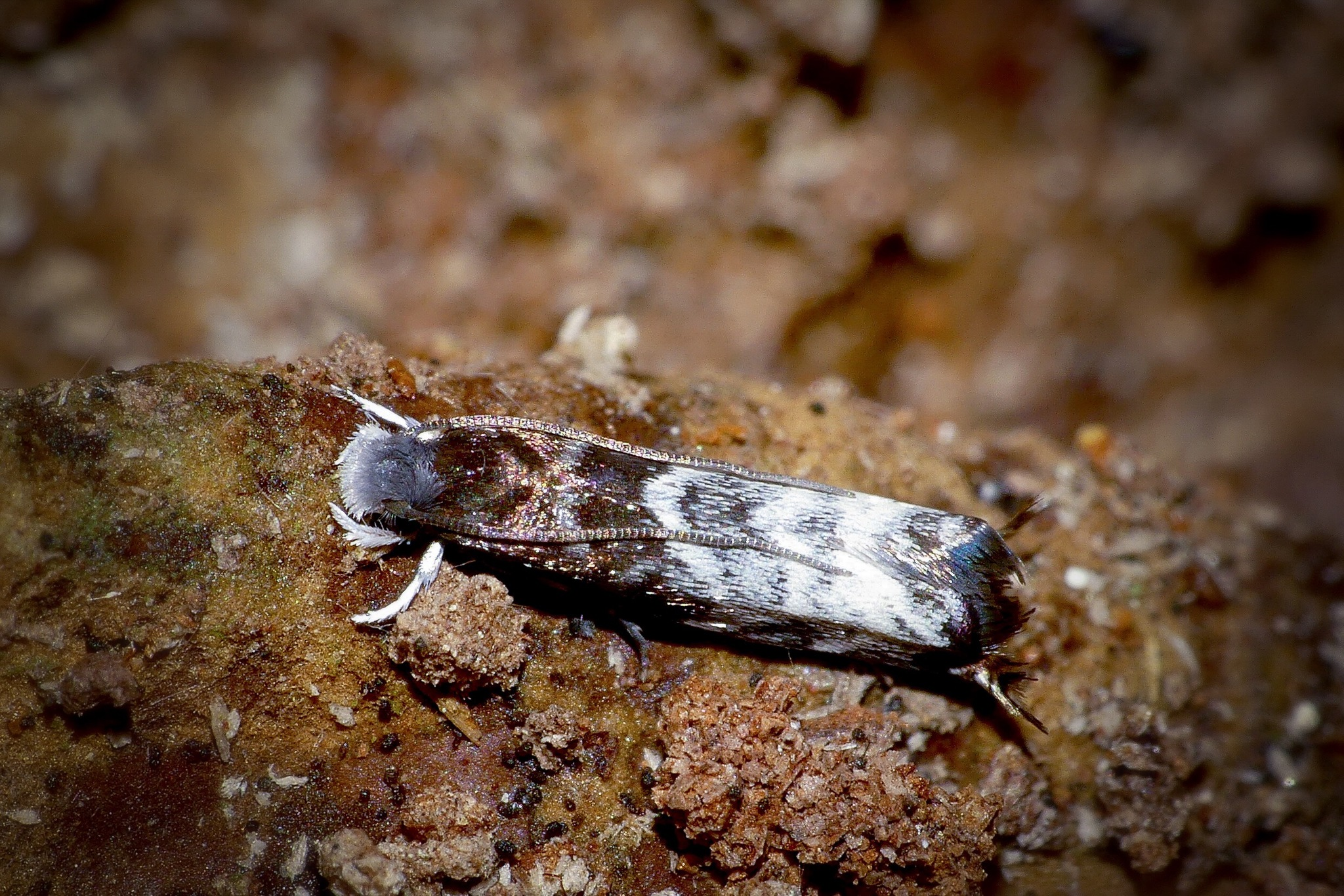
- Eugennaea laquearia

Scientific classification
- Kingdom: Animalia
- Phylum: Arthropoda
- Clade: Pancrustacea
- Class: Insecta
- Order: Lepidoptera
- Family: Tineidae
- Genus: Eugennaea; Meyrick, 1915
- Species: E. laquearia

Binomial name
- Eugennaea laquearia (Meyrick, 1914)

Synonyms
- Decadarchis laquearia Meyrick, 1914

= Eugennaea =

Genus of moths

Eugennaea is a genus of moths belonging to the family Tineidae. It was described in 1914 by Edward Meyrick. The genus contains only one species, Eugennaea laquearia, which is endemic to New Zealand. Meyrick described the species from specimens collected by George Vernon Hudson on Nīkau stems at Kaeo in January.

== Description of species ==
The wingspan is about 11 mm. The forewings are elongate and dark purple-fuscous, with light-blue reflections. The hindwings are dark fuscous with bronzy reflections.
