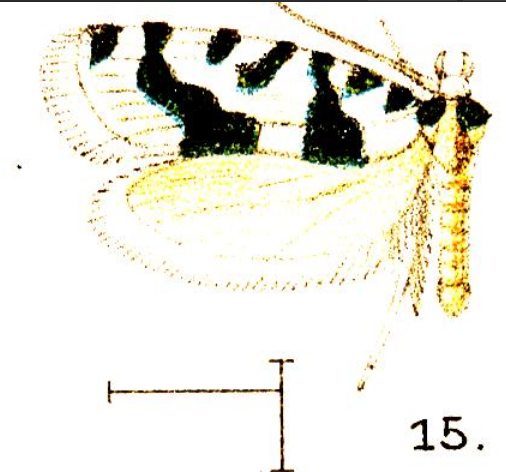

Scientific classification
- Kingdom: Animalia
- Phylum: Arthropoda
- Clade: Pancrustacea
- Class: Insecta
- Order: Lepidoptera
- Family: Tineidae
- Genus: Homodoxus; Walsingham, 1914
- Species: H. aristula

Binomial name
- Homodoxus aristula Walsingham, 1914

= Homodoxus =

Genus of moths

Homodoxus is a genus of moths belonging to the family Tineidae. It contains only one species, Homodoxus aristula, which is found in Mexico and Guatemala.

The wingspan is 14–24 mm.
