= Xystrologa =

Scientific classification
- Kingdom: Animalia
- Phylum: Arthropoda
- Clade: Pancrustacea
- Class: Insecta
- Order: Lepidoptera
- Family: Tineidae
- Genus: Xystrologa; Meyrick, 1919

Synonyms
- Achanodes Meyrick, 1922; Syrrhoaula Meyrick, 1932

Genus of moths

Xystrologa is a genus of moths belonging to the family Tineidae.

== Species ==
- Xystrologa antipathetica (Forbes, 1931)
- Xystrologa fulvicolor Meyrick, 1919
- Xystrologa grenadella (Walsingham, 1897)
- Xystrologa invidiosa Meyrick, 1919
- Xystrologa lactirivis (Meyrick, 1932) (from Manaus, Brazil)
- Xystrologa nigrovitta (Walsingham, 1897)
- Xystrologa sympathetica (Meyrick, 1922)
