= Teichobiinae =

Scientific classification
- Kingdom: Animalia
- Phylum: Arthropoda
- Clade: Pancrustacea
- Class: Insecta
- Order: Lepidoptera
- Family: Tineidae
- Subfamily: Teichobiinae; Heinemann, 1870

Subfamily of moths

The Teichobiinae are a subfamily of moth of the family Tineidae.

== Genera ==
- Dinochora
- Ectropoceros
- Psychoides
