= Plaesiostola =

Scientific classification
- Kingdom: Animalia
- Phylum: Arthropoda
- Clade: Pancrustacea
- Class: Insecta
- Order: Lepidoptera
- Family: Tineidae
- Genus: Plaesiostola; Meyrick, 1926
- Species: P. diaplintha

Binomial name
- Plaesiostola diaplintha Meyrick, 1926

Genus of moths

Plaesiostola is a genus of moths belonging to the family Tineidae. It contains only one species, Plaesiostola diaplintha, which is found on Borneo.
