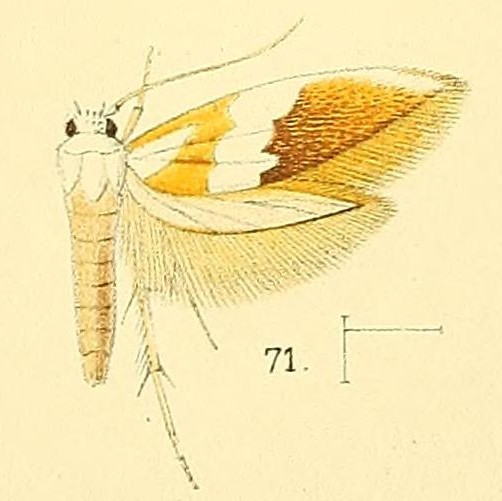
- Oxymachaeris niveocervina

Scientific classification
- Kingdom: Animalia
- Phylum: Arthropoda
- Clade: Pancrustacea
- Class: Insecta
- Order: Lepidoptera
- Family: Tineidae
- Subfamily: Myrmecozelinae
- Genus: Oxymachaeris; Walsingham, 1891

Type species
- Oxymachaeris niveocervina Walsingham, 1891

= Oxymachaeris =

Genus of moths

Oxymachaeris is a genus of moths belonging to the family Tineidae.

== Species ==
- Oxymachaeris euryzancla Meyrick, 1918
- Oxymachaeris niveocervina Walsingham, 1891
- Oxymachaeris xanthophylla (Meyrick, 1931)
- Oxymachaeris zulella (Walsingham, 1881)
