= Ocnophilella =

Scientific classification
- Kingdom: Animalia
- Phylum: Arthropoda
- Clade: Pancrustacea
- Class: Insecta
- Order: Lepidoptera
- Family: Tineidae
- Subfamily: Tineinae
- Genus: Ocnophilella; T. B. Fletcher, 1940
- Species: O. autocrypta

Binomial name
- Ocnophilella autocrypta (Meyrick, 1926)

Synonyms
- Generic; Hilarochorda Gozmány & Vári, 1973; Specific; Ocnophila autocrypta Meyrick, 1926

Genus of moths

Ocnophilella is a monotypic moth genus belonging to the family Tineidae described by Thomas Bainbrigge Fletcher in 1940. Its only species, Ocnophilella autocrypta, described by Edward Meyrick in 1926, was found in Western Cape, South Africa.
