= Leucophasma =

Scientific classification
- Kingdom: Animalia
- Phylum: Arthropoda
- Clade: Pancrustacea
- Class: Insecta
- Order: Lepidoptera
- Family: Tineidae
- Genus: Leucophasma; Walsingham, 1897

Genus of moths

Leucophasma is a genus of moths belonging to the family Tineidae, typically found in the Caribbean region.

== Etymology ==
The genus was first described by Walsingham in 1897. The name combines the Greek words leukos, meaning "white", and phasma, meaning "apparition" or "ghost".

== Species ==
=== Leucophasma phantasmella ===
The species was described by Walsingham in 1897, and one of the first species recorded, first by a small male specimen.

It is a small, pale moth possessing lanceolate white wings with a golden-yellow suffusion. It is more pronounced in the middle and apical areas, along with a small dark brown dot at the extreme apex. The cilia are white with a golden-yellow sheen, along with its white antennas.

=== Leucophasma carmodiella ===
The species was described by Busck in 1897, and one of the second species recorded.
