= Glaucostolella =

Scientific classification
- Kingdom: Animalia
- Phylum: Arthropoda
- Clade: Pancrustacea
- Class: Insecta
- Order: Lepidoptera
- Family: Tineidae
- Genus: Glaucostolella; T. B. Fletcher, 1940
- Species: G. oxyteles

Binomial name
- Glaucostolella oxyteles (Meyrick, 1926)

Synonyms
- Genus: Glaucostola Meyrick, 1926; Species: Glaucostola oxyteles Meyrick, 1926

Genus of moths

Glaucostolella is a genus of moths belonging to the family Tineidae. It contains only one species, Glaucostolella oxyteles, which is found in South Africa.
