= Thyrsochares =

Scientific classification
- Kingdom: Animalia
- Phylum: Arthropoda
- Clade: Pancrustacea
- Class: Insecta
- Order: Lepidoptera
- Family: Tineidae
- Genus: Thyrsochares; Meyrick, 1938
- Species: T. idiocrossa

Binomial name
- Thyrsochares idiocrossa Meyrick, 1938

Genus of moths

Thyrsochares is a genus of moths belonging to the family Tineidae. It contains only one species, Thyrsochares idiocrossa, which is found in New Guinea.
