= Trichearias =

Scientific classification
- Kingdom: Animalia
- Phylum: Arthropoda
- Clade: Pancrustacea
- Class: Insecta
- Order: Lepidoptera
- Family: Tineidae
- Genus: Trichearias; Dognin, 1905
- Species: T. nigella

Binomial name
- Trichearias nigella Dognin, 1905

Genus of moths

Trichearias is a genus of moths belonging to the family Tineidae. It contains only one species, Trichearias nigella, which is found in Ecuador.

The wingspan is about 17 mm.
