= Thomictis =

Scientific classification
- Kingdom: Animalia
- Phylum: Arthropoda
- Clade: Pancrustacea
- Class: Insecta
- Order: Lepidoptera
- Family: Tineidae
- Genus: Thomictis; Meyrick, 1920
- Species: T. ephorista

Binomial name
- Thomictis ephorista Meyrick, 1920

Genus of moths

Thomictis is a genus of moths belonging to the family Tineidae. It contains only one species, Thomictis ephorista, which is found in Guyana.

The wingspan is 8–10 mm. The forewings are elongate and dark bronzy-fuscous with a broad ochreous-whitish median streak gradually dilated from the base to the termen. The hindwings are brassy-grey.
