= Acridotarsa =

Scientific classification
- Kingdom: Animalia
- Phylum: Arthropoda
- Clade: Pancrustacea
- Class: Insecta
- Order: Lepidoptera
- Family: Tineidae
- Subfamily: Tineinae
- Genus: Acridotarsa; Meyrick, 1893

Type species
- Acridotarsa mylitis Meyrick, 1893

Synonyms
- Ectinocampa Silvestri, 1944; Emmetoeca Meyrick, 1921; Holacarta Meyrick, 1917; Paraclystis Meyrick, 1915; Passalactis Meyrick, 1935; Plastopolypus Silvestri, 1920

Genus of moths

Acridotarsa is a genus of moths belonging to the family Tineidae. The genus was described by Edward Meyrick in 1893.

The larvae are associated with termites' nests.

== Species ==
- Acridotarsa celsella (Walker, 1863) (Australia)
- Acridotarsa conglomerata (Meyrick, 1922) (Australia)
- Acridotarsa melipecta (Meyrick, 1915) (continental Africa & Africa)
- Acridotarsa mylitis Meyrick, 1893 (Australia)
- Acridotarsa nasutitermina (Silvestri) (Brazil)

== Former species ==
Erechthias deloneura was formerly placed here.
