= Dasmophora =

Scientific classification
- Kingdom: Animalia
- Phylum: Arthropoda
- Clade: Pancrustacea
- Class: Insecta
- Order: Lepidoptera
- Family: Tineidae
- Genus: Dasmophora; Meyrick, 1919
- Species: D. xerospila

Binomial name
- Dasmophora xerospila Meyrick, 1919

Genus of moths

Dasmophora is a moth genus, belonging to the family Tineidae. It contains only one species, Dasmophora xerospila, which is found in French Guiana.

The wingspan is about 17 mm. The forewings are elongate and pale greyish-ochreous irregularly sprinkled with fuscous and dark fuscous and dark fuscous spots on the costa at the base. The hindwings are grey, but lighter anteriorly.
