= Syncraternis =

Scientific classification
- Kingdom: Animalia
- Phylum: Arthropoda
- Clade: Pancrustacea
- Class: Insecta
- Order: Lepidoptera
- Family: Tineidae
- Genus: Syncraternis; Meyrick, 1922

Genus of moths

Syncraternis is a genus of moths belonging to the family Tineidae.

== Species ==
- Syncraternis anthestias Meyrick, 1922
- Syncraternis phaeospila Meyrick, 1922
