= Hapalothyma =

Scientific classification
- Kingdom: Animalia
- Phylum: Arthropoda
- Clade: Pancrustacea
- Class: Insecta
- Order: Lepidoptera
- Family: Tineidae
- Genus: Hapalothyma; Meyrick, 1919

Genus of moths

Hapalothyma is a genus of moths belonging to the family Tineidae.

== Species ==
- Hapalothyma ioplocama Meyrick, 1919
- Hapalothyma xanthochorda Meyrick, 1919
