= Ranohira silvestris =

Scientific classification
- Kingdom: Animalia
- Phylum: Arthropoda
- Clade: Pancrustacea
- Class: Insecta
- Order: Lepidoptera
- Family: Tineidae
- Genus: Ranohira; Viette, 1952
- Species: R. silvestris

Binomial name
- Ranohira silvestris Viette, 1952

Species of moth

Ranohira is a monotypic moth genus belonging to the family Tineidae described by Pierre Viette in 1952. It contains only one species, Ranohira silvestris, described by the same author in the same year, which is found in Madagascar. The type locality for this genus is Ranohira, Madagascar.
