= Acanthocheira =

Scientific classification
- Kingdom: Animalia
- Phylum: Arthropoda
- Clade: Pancrustacea
- Class: Insecta
- Order: Lepidoptera
- Family: Tineidae
- Genus: Acanthocheira; Gozmány, 1968
- Species: A. loxopa

Binomial name
- Acanthocheira loxopa (Meyrick, 1914)

Synonyms
- Amydria loxopa Meyrick, 1914

Genus of moths

Acanthocheira is a monotypic moth genus belonging to the family Tineidae, in which it is not assigned to a subfamily. The genus was established in 1968 by Dr László Gozmány.

Its sole species, Acanthocheira loxopa, was originally described by Edward Meyrick in 1914, as Amydria loxopa.

== Distribution ==
Acanthocheira loxopa is known from South Africa, with a type locality in the Eastern Cape province.
