= Eriozancla =

Scientific classification
- Kingdom: Animalia
- Phylum: Arthropoda
- Clade: Pancrustacea
- Class: Insecta
- Order: Lepidoptera
- Family: Tineidae
- Genus: Eriozancla; Gozmány & Vári, 1973
- Species: E. trachyphaea

Binomial name
- Eriozancla trachyphaea (Meyrick, 1921)

Synonyms
- Xylesthia trachyphaea Meyrick, 1921

Genus of moths

Eriozancla is a genus of moths belonging to the family Tineidae. It contains only one species, Eriozancla trachyphaea, which is found in South Africa.
