= Nyctocyrmata =

Scientific classification
- Kingdom: Animalia
- Phylum: Arthropoda
- Clade: Pancrustacea
- Class: Insecta
- Order: Lepidoptera
- Family: Tineidae
- Subfamily: Myrmecozelinae
- Genus: Nyctocyrmata; Gozmany & Vári, 1973

Type species
- Macraeola crotalopis Meyrick, 1921

Genus of moths

Nyctocyrmata is a genus of moths belonging to the family Tineidae.

== Species ==
- Nyctocyrmata crotalopis Meyrick, 1921 (from South Africa)
- Nyctocyrmata numeesia Mey, 2011 (from Namibia)
