= Erysimaga =

Scientific classification
- Kingdom: Animalia
- Phylum: Arthropoda
- Clade: Pancrustacea
- Class: Insecta
- Order: Lepidoptera
- Family: Tineidae
- Genus: Erysimaga; Meyrick, 1938
- Species: E. chlororrhabda

Binomial name
- Erysimaga chlororrhabda Meyrick, 1938

Genus of moths

Erysimaga is a genus of moths belonging to the family Tineidae. It contains only one species, Erysimaga chlororrhabda, which is found in Papua New Guinea.
