= Hecatompeda =

Scientific classification
- Kingdom: Animalia
- Phylum: Arthropoda
- Clade: Pancrustacea
- Class: Insecta
- Order: Lepidoptera
- Family: Tineidae
- Genus: Hecatompeda; Meyrick, 1929
- Species: H. pyrocephala

Binomial name
- Hecatompeda pyrocephala Meyrick, 1929

Genus of moths

Hecatompeda is a genus of moths belonging to the family Tineidae. It contains only one species, Hecatompeda pyrocephala, which is found on the Solomon Islands.
