= Syrmologa =

Scientific classification
- Kingdom: Animalia
- Phylum: Arthropoda
- Clade: Pancrustacea
- Class: Insecta
- Order: Lepidoptera
- Family: Tineidae
- Genus: Syrmologa; Meyrick, 1919

Genus of moths

Syrmologa is a genus of South American moths belonging to the family Tineidae.

== Species ==
- Syrmologa chersopa Meyrick, 1919 (from Guyana)
- Syrmologa leucoclistra Meyrick, 1919 (from Peru)
- Syrmologa spermatias Meyrick, 1919 (from Guyana)
- Syrmologa thriophora Meyrick, 1919 (from Guyana)
