= Zymologa =

Scientific classification
- Kingdom: Animalia
- Phylum: Arthropoda
- Clade: Pancrustacea
- Class: Insecta
- Order: Lepidoptera
- Family: Tineidae
- Genus: Zymologa; Meyrick, 1919
- Species: Z. mylicopa

Binomial name
- Zymologa mylicopa Meyrick, 1919

Genus of moths

Zymologa is a moth genus, belonging to the family Tineidae. It contains only one species, Zymologa mylicopa, which is found in Colombia.
