= Wyoma =

Scientific classification
- Kingdom: Animalia
- Phylum: Arthropoda
- Clade: Pancrustacea
- Class: Insecta
- Order: Lepidoptera
- Family: Tineidae
- Subfamily: Tineinae
- Genus: Wyoma; J.F.G.Clarke, 1986

Type species
- Wyoma dysgnoia J.F.G.Clarke, 1986

Diversity
- 5 species

Genus of moths

Wyoma is a small genus of the fungus moth family, Tineidae. Therein, it belongs to the subfamily Tineinae. It is probably fairly closely related to the type genus of its family and subfamily, Tinea, and can be most easily separated by the wing venation – in Tinea, two veins in each wing arise from a common stalk, whereas none do in Wyoma.

== Description ==
The head is bulging and has a rough, scaly and hairy surface, but the well-developed proboscis is devoid of scales. The labial palps droop; their second segment is longer than the third and has a clump of stout bristles at the tip, facing outside. The maxillary palps are long and usually carried tucked in. The antenna are unbranched and about as long as the forewing; the scape bears a flimsy comb.

The forewings are narrow and have a rounded tip and 12 separate veins. Of these, vein 1b is simple, 2 starts near the angle of the wing, 7 reaches the leading edge near the tip and 11 starts from the basal fourth of the wing. Vein 4 is closer to 5 than to 3, and vein 10 is well separate from 9 and 11. The hindwings have only 8 veins, with the anal veins vestigial or absent. The hindwing veins are also all separated; vein 2 starts notably before the angle, while the position of vein 7 is equivalent to the forewing; veins 4-6 are evenly spaced, but vein 3 runs closer to vein 2.

The male genitals are symmetrical and resemble those of Tinea; they lack a socius, but gnathos and uncus are present. Female genitalia are not well described, but as dar as is known they differ markedly from those of Tinea.

== Species ==
Only five species are contained in Wyoma:

- Wyoma dysgnoia J.F.G.Clarke, 1986
- Wyoma echinastra (Meyrick, 1931)
- Wyoma leucostega (Meyrick, 1932)
- Wyoma schoenoploca (Meyrick, 1911)
- Wyoma striaticostella (Petersen, 1959)
