= Tetanostola =

Scientific classification
- Kingdom: Animalia
- Phylum: Arthropoda
- Clade: Pancrustacea
- Class: Insecta
- Order: Lepidoptera
- Family: Tineidae
- Genus: Tetanostola; Meyrick, 1931
- Species: T. hexagona

Binomial name
- Tetanostola hexagona Meyrick, 1931

Genus of moths

Tetanostola is a genus of moths belonging to the family Tineidae. It contains only one species, Tetanostola hexagona, which is found on Madagascar.
