= Monachoptilas =

Scientific classification
- Kingdom: Animalia
- Phylum: Arthropoda
- Clade: Pancrustacea
- Class: Insecta
- Order: Lepidoptera
- Family: Tineidae
- Genus: Monachoptilas; Meyrick, 1934

Genus of moths

Monachoptilas is a genus of moths belonging to the family Tineidae.

== Species ==
- Monachoptilas berista Viette, 1954
- Monachoptilas hyperaesthetica Meyrick, 1934
- Monachoptilas musicodora Meyrick, 1934
- Monachoptilas paulianella Viette, 1955
- Monachoptilas petitiella Viette, 1954
- Monachoptilas stempfferiella Viette, 1954
