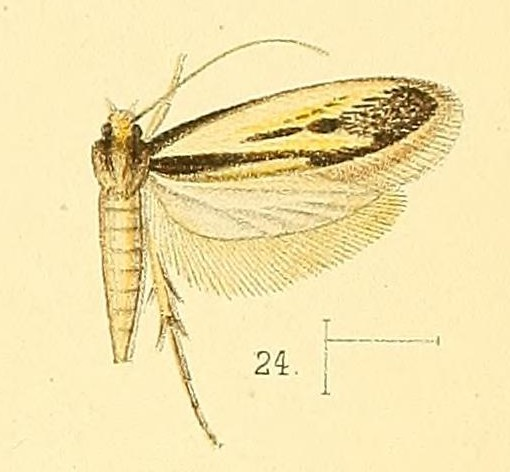
- Proterospastis zebra

Scientific classification
- Kingdom: Animalia
- Phylum: Arthropoda
- Clade: Pancrustacea
- Class: Insecta
- Order: Lepidoptera
- Family: Tineidae
- Subfamily: Tineinae
- Genus: Proterospastis; Meyrick, 1937

Synonyms
- Paratinea Petersen, 1957

= Proterospastis =

Genus of moths

Proterospastis is a genus of moths belonging to the family Tineidae.

== Species ==
- Proterospastis abscisa (Gozmány, 1967)
- Proterospastis antiphracta (Meyrick, 1909)
- Proterospastis barystacta Meyrick, 1937
- Proterospastis brandbergica Gozmány, 2004
- Proterospastis craurota (Meyrick, 1920)
- Proterospastis homestia (Meyrick, 1908)
- Proterospastis megaspila (Meyrick, 1913)
- Proterospastis platyphallos Gozmány, 2004
- Proterospastis taeniala (Gozmány, 1968)
- Proterospastis trilinguis (Meyrick, 1920)
- Proterospastis zebra (Walsingham, 1891)
