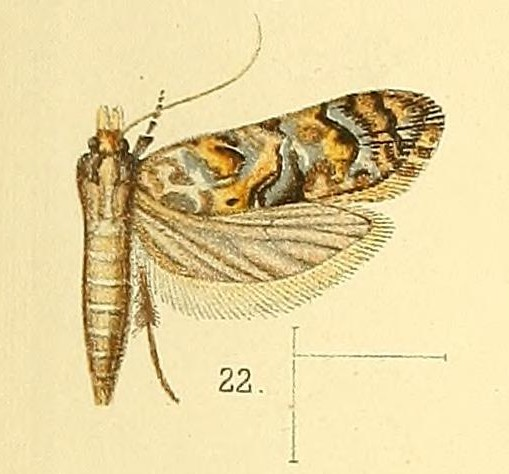
- Autochthonus chalybiellus

Scientific classification
- Kingdom: Animalia
- Phylum: Arthropoda
- Clade: Pancrustacea
- Class: Insecta
- Order: Lepidoptera
- Family: Tineidae
- Subfamily: Siloscinae
- Genus: Autochthonus; Walsingham, 1891

Type species
- Autochthonus chalybiellus Walsingham, 1891

= Autochthonus =

Genus of moths

Autochthonus is a genus of moths belonging to the family Tineidae. The genus was described in 1891 by Lord Walsingham.

== Species ==
- Autochthonus chalybiellus Walsingham, 1891 (from Gambia/Tanzania)
- Autochthonus singulus Huang, Hirowatari & Wang, 2009 (from China)
