= Crypsithyris =

Scientific classification
- Kingdom: Animalia
- Phylum: Arthropoda
- Clade: Pancrustacea
- Class: Insecta
- Order: Lepidoptera
- Family: Tineidae
- Subfamily: Tineinae
- Genus: Crypsithyris; Meyrick, 1907

Type species
- Crypsithyris mesodyas Meyrick, 1907

Genus of moths

Crypsithyris is a genus of moths belonging to the family Tineidae.

== Species ==
- Crypsithyris abstrusa Meyrick, 1917
- Crypsithyris auriala (Gozmány, 1967) (=Tinea coruscans Gozmány, 1967)
- Crypsithyris cana Sakai & Saigusa, 2002
- Crypsithyris cerodectis Meyrick, 1921
- Crypsithyris chrysippa Meyrick, 1917
- Crypsithyris crococoma Meyrick, 1934
- Crypsithyris efflexa (Xiao & Li, 2006) (from China)
- Crypsithyris enixa Meyrick, 1921
- Crypsithyris epachyrota Meyrick, 1917 (=Crypsithyris zymota Meyrick, 1917)
- Crypsithyris falcovalva Bland, 1976
- Crypsithyris fissella (Walker, 1863)
- Crypsithyris fuscicoma Meyrick, 1937
- Crypsithyris hebeiensis Xiao & Li, 2005
- Crypsithyris hemiphracta Meyrick, 1926
- Crypsithyris hoenei Petersen & Gaedike, 1993
- Crypsithyris hypnota Meyrick, 1907 (=Crypsithyris soporata Meyrick, 1911)
- Crypsithyris illaetabilis Turner, 1926
- Crypsithyris immolata (Meyrick, 1931)
- Crypsithyris insolita Meyrick, 1918
- Crypsithyris introflexa Xiao & Li, 2005
- Crypsithyris japonica Petersen & Gaedike, 1993
- Crypsithyris longicornis (Stainton, 1859)
- Crypsithyris luteocapitata Gaedike, 2014
- Crypsithyris melosema Meyrick, 1917
- Crypsithyris mesodyas Meyrick, 1907
- Crypsithyris miranda Gozmány, 1966
- Crypsithyris monospila (Meyrick, 1929)
- Crypsithyris nanlingensis G.H. Huang, Hirowatari & M. Wang, 2009
- Crypsithyris obtusangula Xiao & Li, 2005
- Crypsithyris orchas Meyrick, 1907
- Crypsithyris pheretropa Meyrick, 1931
- Crypsithyris psolocoma Meyrick, 1931
- Crypsithyris ruwenzorica Gozmány, 1966
- Crypsithyris saigusai Gaedike, 2000
- Crypsithyris sarobiella (G. Petersen, 1959)
- Crypsithyris sciophracta Meyrick, 1927
- Crypsithyris serrata Y.L.Xiao & H.H.Li, 2007
- Crypsithyris spelaea Meyrick, 1908
- Crypsithyris spissa Meyrick, 1918
- Crypsithyris stenovalva Gozmány, 1965
- Crypsithyris symphyrta Meyrick, 1921
- Crypsithyris synolca Meyrick, 1917 (=Crypsithyris liaropa Meyrick, 1924)
- Crypsithyris thamnomyphila Boudinot, 1985
- Crypsithyris trimaculata (G. Petersen, 1973)
- Crypsithyris turcica Gaedike, 2006
- Crypsithyris unipuncta Gaedike, 2014
