= Melodryas =

Scientific classification
- Kingdom: Animalia
- Phylum: Arthropoda
- Clade: Pancrustacea
- Class: Insecta
- Order: Lepidoptera
- Family: Tineidae
- Genus: Melodryas; Meyrick, 1910
- Species: M. doris

Binomial name
- Melodryas doris Meyrick, 1910

Genus of moths

Melodryas is a genus of moths belonging to the family Tineidae. It contains only one species, Melodryas doris, which is found on the Solomon Islands.

The wingspan is 20–21 mm. The forewings are elongate and purplish-black with a broad orange transverse fascia.
