= Cosmeombra =

Scientific classification
- Kingdom: Animalia
- Phylum: Arthropoda
- Clade: Pancrustacea
- Class: Insecta
- Order: Lepidoptera
- Family: Tineidae
- Genus: Cosmeombra; Gozmány & Vári, 1973
- Species: C. doxochares

Binomial name
- Cosmeombra doxochares (Meyrick, 1926)

Synonyms
- Tinea doxochares Meyrick, 1926

Genus of moths

Cosmeombra is a genus of moths belonging to the family Tineidae. It contains only one species, Cosmeombra doxochares, which is found in South Africa.
