= Silosca =

Scientific classification
- Kingdom: Animalia
- Phylum: Arthropoda
- Clade: Pancrustacea
- Class: Insecta
- Order: Lepidoptera
- Family: Tineidae
- Subfamily: Siloscinae
- Genus: Silosca; Gozmány, 1965

Type species
- Silosca mariae Gozmány, 1965

Genus of moths

Silosca is a genus of moths belonging to the family Tineidae. The genus was described in 1965 by Hungarian entomologist László Anthony Gozmány.

All species in this genus are only known from African countries.

== Species ==
- Silosca comorensis Gozmány, 1968
- Silosca hypsocola Gozmány, 1968
- Silosca licziae Gozmány, 1967
- Silosca mariae Gozmány, 1965
- Silosca savannae Gozmány, 1968
- Silosca somnis Gozmány, 1967
- Silosca superba Gozmány, 1967
