= Chionoreas =

Scientific classification
- Kingdom: Animalia
- Phylum: Arthropoda
- Clade: Pancrustacea
- Class: Insecta
- Order: Lepidoptera
- Family: Tineidae
- Genus: Chionoreas; Meyrick, 1926
- Species: C. euryochtha

Binomial name
- Chionoreas euryochtha Meyrick, 1926

Genus of moths

Chionoreas is a genus of moths belonging to the family Tineidae. It contains only one species, Chionoreas euryochtha, which is found on Borneo.
