= Hypoplesia =

Scientific classification
- Kingdom: Animalia
- Phylum: Arthropoda
- Clade: Pancrustacea
- Class: Insecta
- Order: Lepidoptera
- Family: Tineidae
- Genus: Hypoplesia; Busck, 1906

Synonyms
- Paraplesia Dietz, 1905

Genus of moths

Hypoplesia is a genus of moths belonging to the family Tineidae.

== Species ==
- Hypoplesia busckiella (Dietz, 1905) (=Myrmecozela respersa Meyrick, 1919)
- Hypoplesia dietziella Busck, 1913
