= Barymochtha =

Scientific classification
- Kingdom: Animalia
- Phylum: Arthropoda
- Clade: Pancrustacea
- Class: Insecta
- Order: Lepidoptera
- Family: Tineidae
- Genus: Barymochtha; Meyrick, 1922
- Species: B. entherastis

Binomial name
- Barymochtha entherastis Meyrick, 1922

Genus of moths

Barymochtha is a genus of moths belonging to the family Tineidae. It contains only one species, Barymochtha entherastis, which is found in Guyana.
