= Afghanotinea =

Scientific classification
- Kingdom: Animalia
- Phylum: Arthropoda
- Clade: Pancrustacea
- Class: Insecta
- Order: Lepidoptera
- Family: Tineidae
- Genus: Afghanotinea; Gozmany, 1959
- Species: A. klapperichi

Binomial name
- Afghanotinea klapperichi Gozmany, 1959

Genus of moths

Afghanotinea is a genus of moths belonging to the family Tineidae. It contains only one species, Afghanotinea klapperichi, which is found in Afghanistan.
