= Protagophleps =

Scientific classification
- Kingdom: Animalia
- Phylum: Arthropoda
- Clade: Pancrustacea
- Class: Insecta
- Order: Lepidoptera
- Family: Tineidae
- Genus: Protagophleps; Viette, 1954
- Species: P. masoala

Binomial name
- Protagophleps masoala Viette, 1954

Genus of moths

Protagophleps is a genus of moths belonging to the family Tineidae. It contains only one species, Protagophleps masoala, which is found on Madagascar.
