= Proboloptila =

Scientific classification
- Kingdom: Animalia
- Phylum: Arthropoda
- Clade: Pancrustacea
- Class: Insecta
- Order: Lepidoptera
- Family: Tineidae
- Genus: Proboloptila; Meyrick, 1921

Genus of moths

Proboloptila is a genus of moths belonging to the family Tineidae.

== Species ==
- Proboloptila aeolella (Walsingham, 1897)
- Proboloptila frontella (Walsingham, 1897)
