= Setiarcha =

Scientific classification
- Kingdom: Animalia
- Phylum: Arthropoda
- Clade: Pancrustacea
- Class: Insecta
- Order: Lepidoptera
- Family: Tineidae
- Genus: Setiarcha; Meyrick, 1932
- Species: S. aleuropis

Binomial name
- Setiarcha aleuropis Meyrick, 1932

Genus of moths

Setiarcha is a genus of moths belonging to the family Tineidae. It contains only one species, Setiarcha aleuropis, which is found in Brazil.
