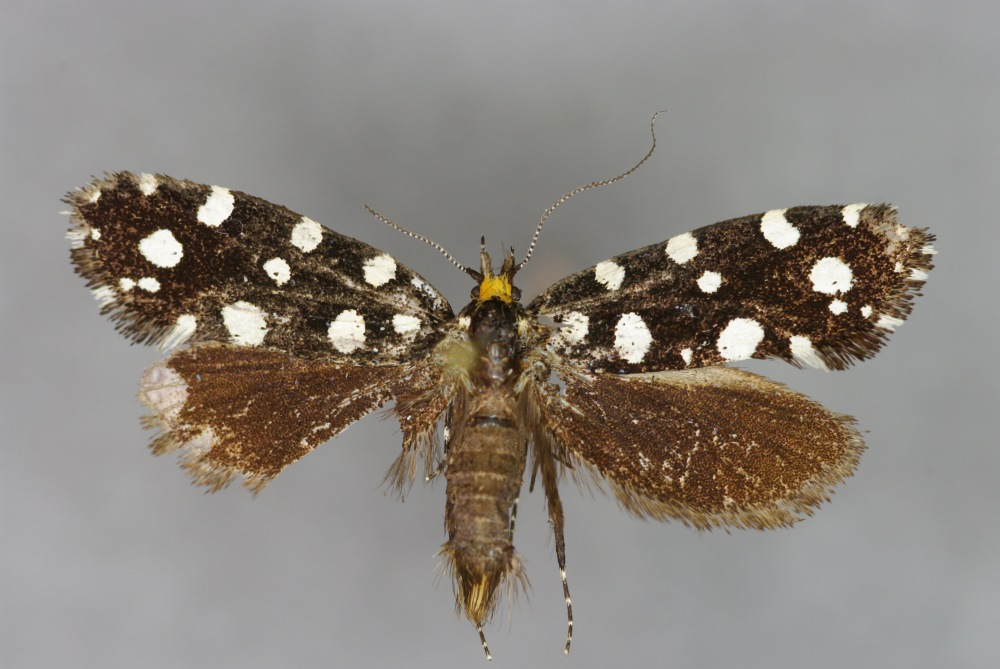
- Euplocamus anthracinalis

Scientific classification
- Kingdom: Animalia
- Phylum: Arthropoda
- Clade: Pancrustacea
- Class: Insecta
- Order: Lepidoptera
- Family: Tineidae
- Subfamily: Euplocaminae; Börner, 1938

= Euplocaminae =

Subfamily of moths

The Euplocaminae are a subfamily of moth of the family Tineidae.

== Genera ==
- Euplocamus
