= Sphecioses =

Scientific classification
- Kingdom: Animalia
- Phylum: Arthropoda
- Clade: Pancrustacea
- Class: Insecta
- Order: Lepidoptera
- Family: Tineidae
- Genus: Sphecioses; D.R.Davis & M.M.Davis, 2007
- Species: S. acignathus

Binomial name
- Sphecioses acignathus D.R.Davis & M.M.Davis, 2007

Genus of moths

Sphecioses is a genus of moths belonging to the family Tineidae. It contains only one species, Sphecioses acignathus, which is found in Venezuela.
