= Miramonopis =

Scientific classification
- Kingdom: Animalia
- Phylum: Arthropoda
- Clade: Pancrustacea
- Class: Insecta
- Order: Lepidoptera
- Family: Tineidae
- Genus: Miramonopis; Gozmány, 1966
- Species: M. viettei

Binomial name
- Miramonopis viettei Gozmány, 1966

Genus of moths

Miramonopis is a genus of moths belonging to the family Tineidae.

There is presently only one species in this genus: Miramonopis viettei Gozmány, 1966 that is known from the Central African Republic.
