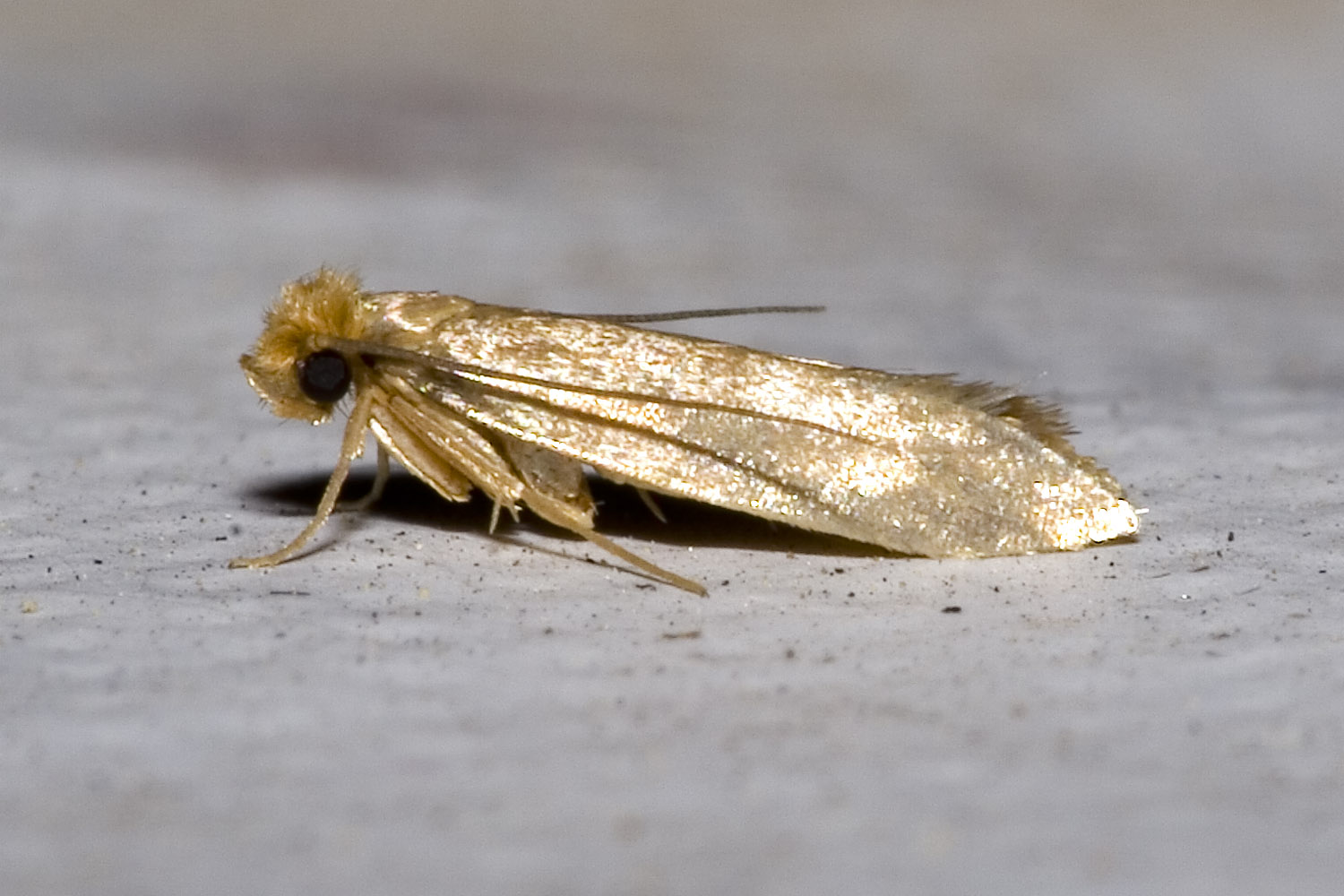
- Common clothes moth (Tineola bisselliella)

Scientific classification
- Kingdom: Animalia
- Phylum: Arthropoda
- Clade: Pancrustacea
- Class: Insecta
- Order: Lepidoptera
- Family: Tineidae
- Subfamily: Tineinae
- Genus: Tineola; Herrich-Schäffer, 1853

Species
- 2, see text

= Tineola =

Genus of moths

Tineola is a genus of moths of the family Tineidae. There are two species, including the familiar common clothes moth (T. bisselliella).

Species:

- Tineola anaphecola Gozmány, 1967
- Tineola bisselliella (Hummel, 1823) - common clothes moth, webbing clothes moth
