= Tineomigma =

Scientific classification
- Kingdom: Animalia
- Phylum: Arthropoda
- Clade: Pancrustacea
- Class: Insecta
- Order: Lepidoptera
- Family: Tineidae
- Subfamily: Hieroxestinae
- Genus: Tineomigma; Gozmány, 2004
- Species: T. transiens

Binomial name
- Tineomigma transiens Gozmány, 2004

Genus of moths

Tineomigma is a genus of moths belonging to the family Tineidae.

There is presently only one species in this genus, Tineomigma transiens Gozmány, 2004 that is known from Namibia.
