= Graphicoptila =

Scientific classification
- Kingdom: Animalia
- Phylum: Arthropoda
- Class: Insecta
- Order: Lepidoptera
- Clade: Eulepidoptera
- Clade: Ditrysia
- Superfamily: Tineoidea
- Family: Tineidae
- Genus: Graphicoptila; Meyrick, 1931
- Species: G. dissociata

Binomial name
- Graphicoptila dissociata (Meyrick, 1922)

Synonyms
- Tineola dissociata Meyrick, 1922; Tinea diplobola Meyrick, 1931; Tineola dissociata Meyrick, 1922

Genus of moths

Graphicoptila is a genus of clothes moths in the family Tineidae. This genus has a single species, Graphicoptila dissociata. It is found in India.
