= Crypsithyrodes =

Scientific classification
- Kingdom: Animalia
- Phylum: Arthropoda
- Clade: Pancrustacea
- Class: Insecta
- Order: Lepidoptera
- Family: Tineidae
- Genus: Crypsithyrodes; Zimmerman, 1978

Genus of moths

Crypsithyrodes is a genus of moths belonging to the family Tineidae.

== Species ==
- Crypsithyrodes auriculata (Meyrick, 1917)
- Crypsithyrodes concolorella (Walker, 1863)
- Crypsithyrodes spectatrix (Meyrick, 1911)
