= Stemagoris =

Scientific classification
- Kingdom: Animalia
- Phylum: Arthropoda
- Clade: Pancrustacea
- Class: Insecta
- Order: Lepidoptera
- Family: Tineidae
- Genus: Stemagoris; Meyrick, 1911
- Species: S. asylaea

Binomial name
- Stemagoris asylaea Meyrick, 1911

Genus of moths

Stemagoris is a genus of moths belonging to the family Tineidae.

There is presently only one species in this genus, Stemagoris asylaea Meyrick, 1911 that is found in South Africa.
