= Clepticodes =

Scientific classification
- Kingdom: Animalia
- Phylum: Arthropoda
- Clade: Pancrustacea
- Class: Insecta
- Order: Lepidoptera
- Family: Tineidae
- Genus: Clepticodes; Meyrick, 1927

Genus of moths

Clepticodes is a genus of moths belonging to the family Tineidae.

== Species ==
- Clepticodes horocentra Meyrick, 1927
- Clepticodes hexaleuca Meyrick, 1932

C. clasmaticus is actually Catalectis pharetropa.
