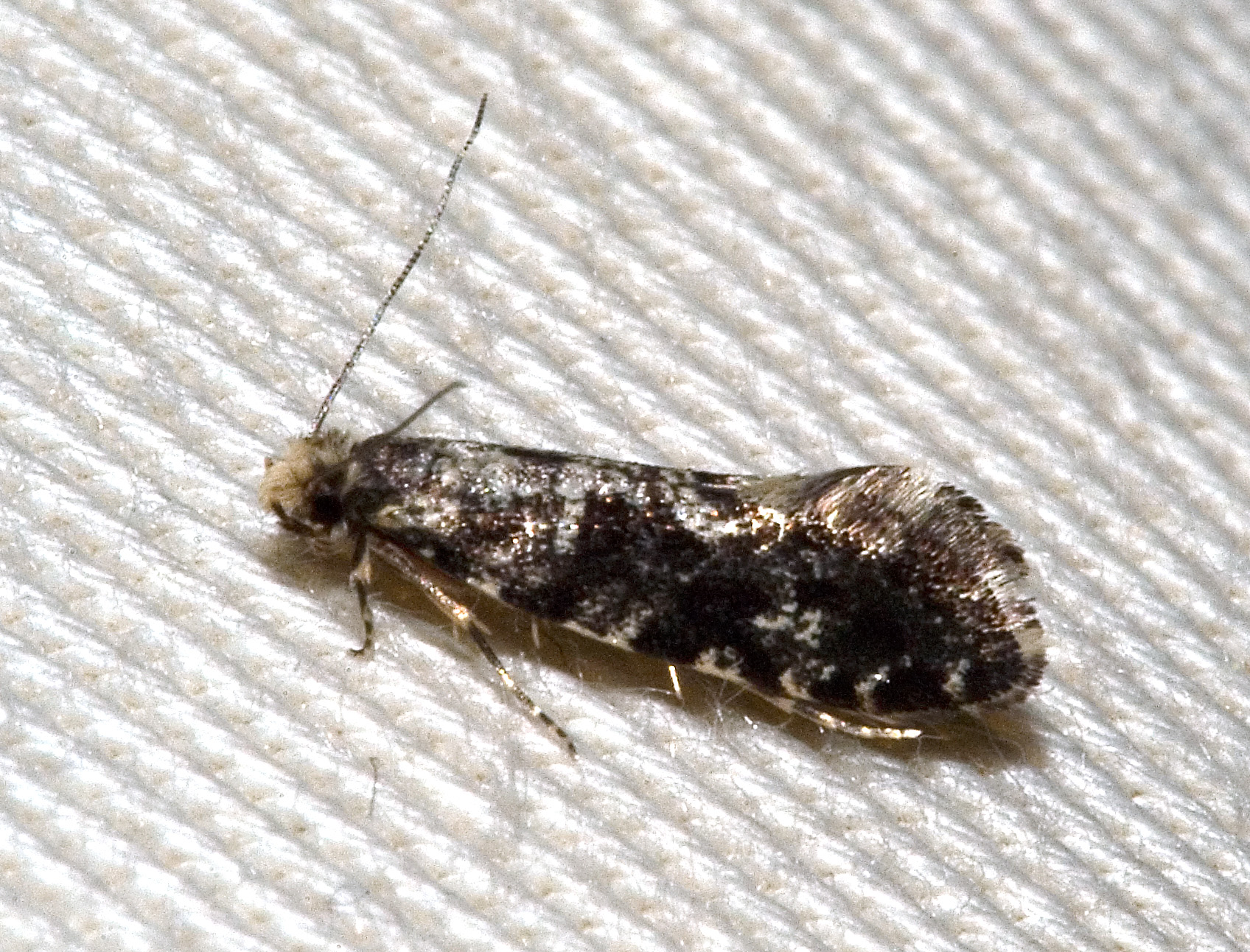
- Adult European grain moth (Nemapogon granella: Nemapogoninae) from Graz, Austria

Scientific classification
- Kingdom: Animalia
- Phylum: Arthropoda
- Class: Insecta
- Order: Lepidoptera
- Superfamily: Tineoidea
- Family: Tineidae; Latreille, 1810

Type genus
- Tinea Linnaeus, 1758

Subfamilies
- Dryadaulinae; Erechthiinae; Euplocaminae; Hapsiferinae; Harmacloninae; Hieroxestinae; Meessiinae; Myrmecozelinae; Nemapogoninae; Perissomasticinae; Scardiinae; Setomorphinae; Siloscinae; Stathmopolitinae; Teichobiinae; Tineinae; and see text

Diversity
- About 357 genera and 2,393 species

= Tineidae =

Tineidae Temporal range: 38–0 Ma Late Eocene to present

Family of moths

Tineidae is a family of moths in the order Lepidoptera described by Pierre André Latreille in 1810. Collectively, they are known as fungus moths or tineid moths. The family contains considerably more than 3,000 species in more than 300 genera. Most of the tineid moths are small or medium-sized, with wings held roofwise over the body when at rest. They are particularly common in the Palaearctic, but many occur elsewhere, and some are found very widely as introduced species.

Tineids are unusual among Lepidoptera as the larvae of only a very small number of species feed on living plants, the majority feeding on fungi, lichens, and detritus. The most familiar members of the family are the clothes moths, which have adapted to feeding on stored fabrics and led to their reputation as a household pest. The most widespread of such species are the common clothes moth (Tineola bisselliella), the case-bearing clothes moth (Tinea pellionella), and the carpet moth (Trichophaga tapetzella); the brown-dotted clothes moth (Niditinea fuscella) despite its name, preferentially feeds on feathers in bird nests.

One remarkable genus is Ceratophaga, whose members feed exclusively on pure keratin in the form of the horns and hooves of dead mammals and even the shells of dead tortoises.

== Systematics ==
=== Subfamilies and notable genera ===
Some species also are listed; for others see genus accounts.

Dryadaulinae

- Brachydoxa
- Dryadaula Meyrick, 1893

Erechthiinae

- Anastathma
- Callicerastis (sometimes in Erechthias)
- Comodica
- Erechthias Meyrick, 1880
- Mecomodica (sometimes in Comodica or Erechthias)
- Petula
- Phthinocola
- Pisistrata
- Pontodryas
- Thuriostoma

Euplocaminae

- Euplocamus Latreille, 1809

Hapsiferinae

- Agorarcha
- Briaraula
- Callocosmeta
- Chrysocrata
- Cimitra
- Colobocrossa
- Cubitofusa
- Cynomastix
- Dasyses
- Hapsifera
- Hapsiferona
- Paraptica
- Parochmastis
- Phyciodyta
- Pitharcha
- Rhinophyllis
- Tiquadra
- Trachycentra
- Zygosignata

Harmacloninae

- Harmaclona
- Micrerethista

Hieroxestinae

- Amphixystis
- Archemitra
- Asymplecta
- Crobylophanes Meyrick, 1938
- Kermania
- Mitrogona Meyrick, 1920
- Oinophila
- Opogona
- Phaeoses
- Phruriastis
- Tineomigma Gozmány, 2004
- Wegneria

Meessiinae

- Afrocelestis
- Agnathosia
- Agoraula
- Augolychna
- Bathroxena
- Clinograptis
- Diachorisia
- Doleromorphia
- Drimylastis
- Emblematodes
- Epactris
- Eudarcia
- Galachrysis
- Homosetia
- Homostinea
- Hybroma
- Infurcitinea
- Ischnoscia
- Isocorypha
- Leucomele
- Lichenotinea
- Matratinea
- Mea
- Meneessia
- Montetinea
- Nannotinea
- Novotinea
- Oenoe
- Oxylychna
- Pompostolella
- Protodarcia
- Stenoptinea
- Tenaga
- Trissochyta
- Unilepidotricha
- Xeringinia

Myrmecozelinae

- Ateliotum
- Analytarcha
- Cephimallota
  - syn. Anemallota
  - syn. Aphimallota
  - syn. Cephitinea
- Cinnerethica
- Contralissa
- Coryptilum
- Criticonoma
- Dicanica
- Dinica
- Drosica
- Ellochotis
- Endromarmata
- Euagophleps
- Exoplisis
- Gerontha
- Haplotinea (tentatively placed here)
- Ippa
- Ischnuridia
- Janseana
- Machaeropteris
- Mesopherna
- Metapherna
- Mimoscopa
- Moerarchis
- Myrmecozela
- Pachyarthra
- Pararhodobates
- Phthoropoea
- Platysceptra
- Propachyarthra
- Rhodobates
- Sarocrania
- Scalmatica
- Timaea
- Tineovertex
- Tracheloteina

Nemapogoninae

- Archinemapogon
- Gaedikeia
- Hyladaula
- Nemapogon
- Nemaxera
- Neurothaumasia
- Peritrana
- Triaxomasia
- Triaxomera
- Vanna

Perissomasticinae

- Cylicobathra
- Ectabola
- Edosa
- Hyperbola
- Neoepiscardia
- Perissomastix
- Phalloscardia
- Sphallesthasis Gozmány, 1959
- Theatrochora

Scardiinae

- Afroscardia
- Amorophaga
- Archyala Meyrick, 1889
- Bythocrates
- Cnismorectis
- Coniastis
- Cranaodes
- Daviscardia
- Diataga
- Dorata
- Hilaroptera Gozmány, 1969
- Leptozancla Meyrick, 1920
- Montescardia
- Morophaga Herrich-Schäffer, 1853
- Pelecystola Meyrick, 1920
- Scardia
- Scardiella
- Semeoloncha Gozmány, 1968
- Tinissa Walker, 1864
- Trigonarchis
- Vespitinea

Setomorphinae

- Lindera
- Prosetomorpha
- Setomorpha

Siloscinae

- Autochthonus Walsingham, 1891
- Organodesma Gozmány, 1965
- Silosca Gozmány, 1965

Stathmopolitinae

- Stathmopolitis

Teichobiinae

- Dinochora
- Ectropoceros
- Psychoides

Tineinae

- Acridotarsa
- Anomalotinea
- Asymphyla
- Ceratobia
- Ceratophaga
- Ceratuncus
- Crypsithyris
- Crypsithyrodes
- Eccritothrix
- Elatobia
- Enargocrasis
- Eremicola
- Graphicoptila
- Hippiochaetes
- Kangerosithyris
- Lipomerinx
- Metatinea
- Miramonopis
- Monopis
- Nearolyma
- Niditinea
- Ocnophilella
- Phereoeca
- Praeacedes
- Pringleophaga
- Proterodesma
- Proterospastis
- Reisserita
- Stemagoris
- Tetrapalpus
- Thomintarra
- Tinea
- Tinemelitta
- Tineola
- Tineomigma
- Trichophaga
- Tryptodema
- Wyoma
- Xerantica

=== Genera incertae sedis ===
These fungus moths have not been assigned to a subfamily with a reasonable amount of certainty:

- Acanthocheira
- Acritotilpha
- Afghanotinea
- Amathyntis
- Ancystrocheira
- Antigambra
- Antipolistes
- Apreta
- Archyala
- Argyrocorys
- Astrogenes
- Axiagasta
- Barymochtha
- Basanasca
- Bascantis
- Brithyceros
- Catalectis
- Catapsilothrix
- Cataxipha
- Catazetema
- Cervaria
- Chionoreas
- Clepticodes
- Colpocrita
- Compsocrita
- Cosmeombra
- Cryphiotechna
- Crypsitricha
- Cubotinea
- Cycloponympha (often placed in Lyonetiidae)
- Dasmophora
- Dolerothera
- Drastea (often placed in Acrolophidae)
- Dyotopasta
- Ecpeptamena
- Endeixis
- Endophthora
- Ephedroxena
- Episyrta
- Eriozancla
- Erysimaga
- Eschatotypa
- Eucrotala
- Eugennaea
- Euprora
- Exonomasis
- Glaucostolella
- Gourbia
- Graphidivalva
- Habrophila
- Hapalothyma
- Harmotona
- Hecatompeda
- Heloscopa (often placed in Oecophoridae)
- Heterostasis
- Hilaroptera
- Histiovalva
- Homalopsycha
- Homodoxus
- Hoplocentra
- Hyalaula
- Hypoplesia
- Leptonoma
- Lepyrotica
- Leucophasma
- Liopycnas
- Lithopsaestis
- Lysiphragma
- Lysitona
- Marmaroxena
- Melodryas
- Merunympha
- Miarotagmata
- Minicorona
- Monachoptilas
- Mythoplastis
- Nesophylacella
- Nonischnoscia
- Nothogenes
- Nyctocyrmata
- Ochetoxena
- Ogmocoma
- Orocrypsona
- Otochares
- Oxymachaeris
- Pachydyta
- Panthytarcha
- Pedaliotis
- Pelecystola
- Peristactis
- Petasactis
- Pezetaera
- Philagraulella
- Phryganeopsis
- Plaesiostola
- Plemyristis
- Polypsecta
- Probatostola
- Proboloptila
- Protagophleps
- Protaphreutis
- Prothinodes
- Psecadioides
- Pyloetis
- Randominta
- Ranohira
- Rungsiodes
- Sagephora
- Scardia
- Sciomystis
- Setiarcha
- Sphecioses
- Stryphnodes
- Syncraternis
- Syngeneta
- Syrmologa
- Taeniodictys (often placed in Lyonetiidae)
- Tephrosara
- Tetanostola
- Thallostoma
- Thisizima
- Thomictis
- Thyrsochares
- Tomara
- Trachyrrhopala
- Trachytyla
- Transmixta
- Trichearias
- Trierostola
- Trithamnora
- Xylesthia
- Xystrologa
- Zonochares
- Zymologa

== Fossil record ==
- †Architinea Rebel, 1934
  - †Architinea balticella Rebel, 1934
  - †Architinea sepositella Rebel, 1934
- †Dysmasiites Kusnezov, 1941
  - †Dysmasiites carpenteri Kusnezov, 1941
- †Electromeessia Kozlov, 1987
  - †Electromeessia zagulijaevi Kozlov, 1987 (Baltic region, Eocene Amber)
- †Glessoscardia Kusnezov, 1941
  - †Glessoscardia gerasimovi Kusnezov, 1941
- †Martynea Kusnezov, 1941
  - †Martynea rebeli Kusnezov, 1941
- †Monopibaltia Skalski, 1974
  - †Monopibaltia ignitella Skalski, 1974 (Baltic region, Eocene Amber)
- †Palaeoinfurcitinea Kozlov, 1987
  - †Palaeoinfurcitinea rohdendorfi Kozlov, 1987 (Russia, Eocene Amber)
- †Palaeoscardiites Kusnezov, 1941
  - †Palaeoscardiites mordvilkoi Kusnezov, 1941
- †Palaeotinea Kozlov, 1987
  - †Palaeotinea rasnitsyni Kozlov, 1987
- †Paratriaxomasia Jarzembowski, 1980
  - †Paratriaxomasia solentensis Jarzembowski, 1980
- †Proscardiites Kusnezov, 1941
  - †Proscardiites martynovi Kusnezov, 1941
- †Pseudocephitinea Kozlov, 1987
  - †Pseudocephitinea svetlanae Kozlov, 1987 (Russia, Eocene Amber)
- †Scardiites Kusnezov, 1941
  - †Scardiites meyricki Kusnezov, 1941
- †Simulotenia Skalski, 1977
  - †Simulotenia intermedia Skalski, 1977
- †Tillyardinea Kusnezov, 1941
  - †Tillyardinea eocaenica Kusnezov, 1941
- Tinea Linnaeus, 1758
  - †Tinea antique Rebel, 1822
- †Tineitella T. B. Fletcher, 1940
  - †Tineitella crystalli Kawall, 1876 (originally in Tineites)
  - †Tineitella sucinacius Kozlov, 1987 (originally in Tineites)
- †Tineolamima Rebel, 1934
  - †Tineolamima aurella Rebel, 1934
- †Tineosemopsis Skalski, 1974
  - †Tineosemopsis decurtatus Skalski, 1974
