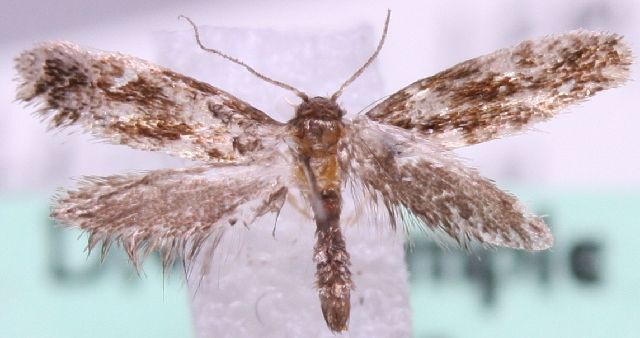
- Infurcitinea argentimaculella

Scientific classification
- Kingdom: Animalia
- Phylum: Arthropoda
- Clade: Pancrustacea
- Class: Insecta
- Order: Lepidoptera
- Family: Tineidae
- Subfamily: Meessiinae; Zagulyaev, 1958

Type genus
- Meessia Hofmann, 1898

Synonyms
- Infurcitineinae Gozmány, 1965

= Meessiinae =

Subfamily of moths

The Meessiinae are a subfamily of moth of the family Tineidae.

== Genera ==
- Afrocelestis
- Agnathosia
- Agoraula
- Augolychna
- Bathroxena
- Clinograptis
- Diachorisia
- Doleromorphia
- Drimylastis
- Emblematodes
- Epactris
- Eudarcia
- Galachrysis
- Homosetia
- Homostinea
- Hybroma
- Infurcitinea
- Ischnoscia
- Isocorypha
- Leucomele
- Lichenotinea
- Matratinea
- Mea
- Meneessia
- Montetinea
- Nannotinea
- Novotinea
- Oenoe
- Oxylychna
- Pompostolella
- Protodarcia
- Stenoptinea
- Tenaga
- Trissochyta
- Unilepidotricha
- Xeringinia
