= Dysoptus pseudargus =

Scientific classification
- Kingdom: Animalia
- Phylum: Arthropoda
- Class: Insecta
- Order: Lepidoptera
- Family: Psychidae
- Genus: Dysoptus
- Species: D. pseudargus

Binomial name
- Dysoptus pseudargus Davis, 2003

Species of moth

Dysoptus pseudargus is a species of moth in the family Arrhenophanidae. It is known only from the lowland Amazonian Region of southern Peru.

The length of the forewings is 5-5.5 mm for males. Adults are on wing from September to November.

== Etymology ==
The species' name is derived from the Greek words pseudos (lie) and argos (white). The naming comes from the physical similarities to Dysoptus argus.
