= Meessiidae =

Scientific classification
- Domain: Eukaryota
- Kingdom: Animalia
- Phylum: Arthropoda
- Class: Insecta
- Order: Lepidoptera
- Superfamily: Tineoidea
- Family: Meessiidae (Zagulyaev, 1958)

Family of moths

Meessiidae is a family of moths in the superfamily Tineoidea. There are at least 2 genera and more than 80 described species in Meessiidae.

== Genera ==
These two genera belong to the family Meessiidae:

- Bathroxena Meyrick, 1919
- Eudarcia Clemens, 1860
