= Dysoptus spilacris =

Scientific classification
- Kingdom: Animalia
- Phylum: Arthropoda
- Class: Insecta
- Order: Lepidoptera
- Family: Psychidae
- Genus: Dysoptus
- Species: D. spilacris

Binomial name
- Dysoptus spilacris Davis, 2003

Species of moth

Dysoptus spilacris is a species of moth in the family Arrhenophanidae. It is common in both primary and secondary forests in La Selva, Costa Rica. It also has been found in the adjacent Braulio Carrillo National Park and in the Mexican state of Veracruz.

The length of the forewings is 4-5.6 mm for males and about 8.8 mm for females. Adults have been collected every month of the year except August and September at La Selva, Costa Rica.
