= Amydria abscensella =

Scientific classification
- Kingdom: Animalia
- Phylum: Arthropoda
- Class: Insecta
- Order: Lepidoptera
- Family: Tineidae
- Genus: Amydria
- Species: A. abscensella

Binomial name
- Amydria abscensella (Walker, 1863)

Synonyms
- Tinea abscensella Walker, 1863

Species of moth

Amydria abscensella is a moth of the family Acrolophidae. It is found in Venezuela.
