= Amydria taracta =

Scientific classification
- Domain: Eukaryota
- Kingdom: Animalia
- Phylum: Arthropoda
- Class: Insecta
- Order: Lepidoptera
- Family: Tineidae
- Genus: Amydria
- Species: A. taracta

Binomial name
- Amydria taracta Walsingham, 1914

Species of moth

Amydria taracta is a moth of the family Acrolophidae. It is found in Guatemala.
