= Dysoptus chiquitus =

Scientific classification
- Domain: Eukaryota
- Kingdom: Animalia
- Phylum: Arthropoda
- Class: Insecta
- Order: Lepidoptera
- Family: Psychidae
- Genus: Dysoptus
- Species: D. chiquitus

Binomial name
- Dysoptus chiquitus (Busck, 1914)

Synonyms
- Arrhenophanes chiquita Busck, 1914; Ecpathophanes chiquita (Busck, 1914)

Species of moth

Dysoptus chiquitus is a species of moth in the family Arrhenophanidae. It is widespread in a large part of the Neotropical lowland wet forests, from Costa Rica south to Mato Grosso in southern Brazil.

The length of the forewings is 4.6-6.5 mm for males and 7-7.2 for females. Adults are probably active during most months of the year throughout their range. Records include January–March, May, August and September.
