= Dysoptus fasciatus =

Scientific classification
- Kingdom: Animalia
- Phylum: Arthropoda
- Class: Insecta
- Order: Lepidoptera
- Family: Psychidae
- Genus: Dysoptus
- Species: D. fasciatus

Binomial name
- Dysoptus fasciatus Davis, 2003

Species of moth

Dysoptus fasciatus is a species of moth in the family Arrhenophanidae. It probably has a wide distribution in the lowland Amazon rainforest. Currently it has been collected only at the type locality in southern Venezuela and possibly in Peru.

The length of the forewings is about 4.1 mm for males and about 9.1 mm for females. Adults are on wing in early February.
