= Ptilopsaltis santarosae =

Scientific classification
- Kingdom: Animalia
- Phylum: Arthropoda
- Class: Insecta
- Order: Lepidoptera
- Family: Tineidae
- Genus: Ptilopsaltis
- Species: P. santarosae

Binomial name
- Ptilopsaltis santarosae Davis, 1986

Species of moth

Ptilopsaltis santarosae is a moth of the family Acrolophidae. It is found in Costa Rica.
