= Agnathosia nana =

Scientific classification
- Kingdom: Animalia
- Phylum: Arthropoda
- Class: Insecta
- Order: Lepidoptera
- Superfamily: Tineoidea
- Family: Tineidae
- Genus: Agnathosia
- Species: A. nana

Binomial name
- Agnathosia nana Bippus, 2020

Species of moth

Agnathosia nana is a moth of the family Tineidae. It is found on Réunion.

The wingspan is 10–12 mm.
