= Dysoptus bilobus =

Scientific classification
- Kingdom: Animalia
- Phylum: Arthropoda
- Class: Insecta
- Order: Lepidoptera
- Family: Psychidae
- Genus: Dysoptus
- Species: D. bilobus

Binomial name
- Dysoptus bilobus Davis, 2112

Species of moth

Dysoptus bilobus is a species of moth in the family name Arrhenophanidae. It is known only from the type locality, a lowland, tropical rainforest habitat in Costa Rica.

The length of the forewings is 3.8–5 mm for males.

== Etymology ==
The specific name is derived from the Latin hi (two, double) and lobus (a rounded projection), in reference to the diagnostic bilobed apex of the sacculus in the male genitalia.
