= Dysoptus anachoreta =

Scientific classification
- Domain: Eukaryota
- Kingdom: Animalia
- Phylum: Arthropoda
- Class: Insecta
- Order: Lepidoptera
- Family: Psychidae
- Genus: Dysoptus
- Species: D. anachoreta

Binomial name
- Dysoptus anachoreta (Bradley, 1951)

Synonyms
- Ecpathophanes anachoreta Bradley, 1951

Species of moth

Dysoptus anachoreta is a species of moth in the family Arrhenophanidae. It is known only from the type locality, Sierra del Libano (also known as El Libano), a dense subtropical forest and a spur of the Cuchilla San Lorenzo on the south-western Sierra Nevada de Santa Marta in Magdalena Province of Colombia.

The length of the forewings is about 10.8 mm for males. Adults are on wing in May (based on one record).
