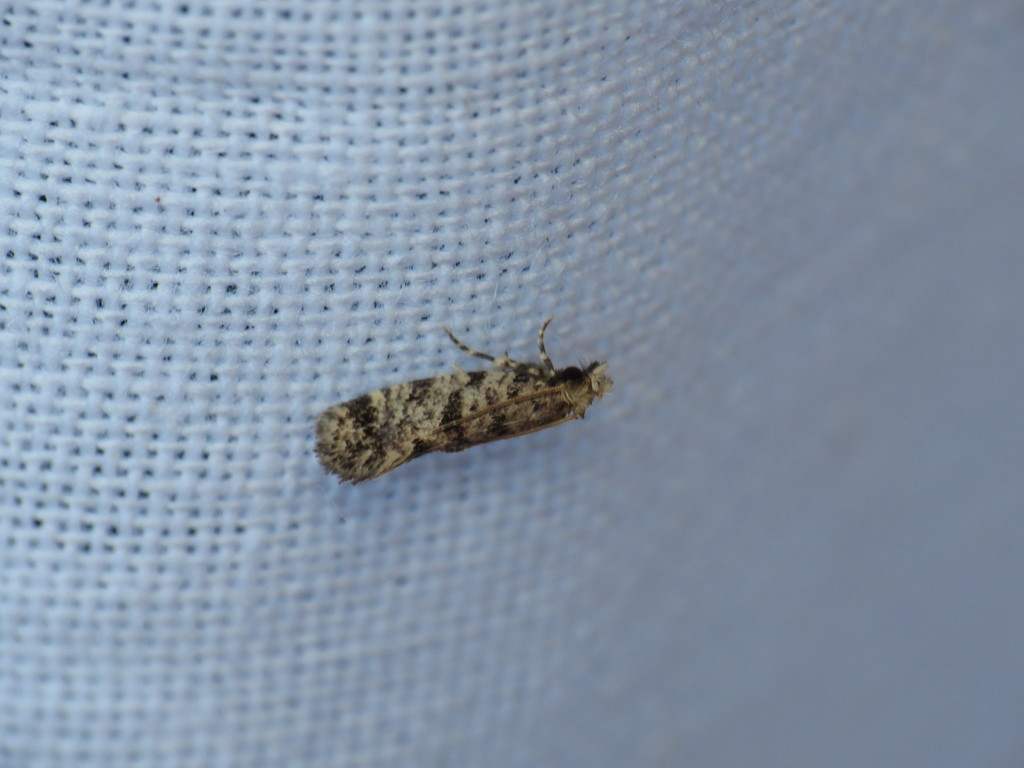

Scientific classification
- Kingdom: Animalia
- Phylum: Arthropoda
- Clade: Pancrustacea
- Class: Insecta
- Order: Lepidoptera
- Family: Tineidae
- Genus: Amydria
- Species: A. dyarella

Binomial name
- Amydria dyarella Dietz, 1905

= Amydria dyarella =

Species of moth

Amydria dyarella is a moth of the family Acrolophidae. It is found in North America, including Alabama, Arkansas, Florida, Indiana, Kentucky, Louisiana, Maryland, Mississippi, North Carolina, Ohio, Texas and West Virginia.
