= Dysoptus tantalota =

Scientific classification
- Domain: Eukaryota
- Kingdom: Animalia
- Phylum: Arthropoda
- Class: Insecta
- Order: Lepidoptera
- Family: Psychidae
- Genus: Dysoptus
- Species: D. tantalota

Binomial name
- Dysoptus tantalota Meyrick, 1919

Species of moth

Dysoptus tantalota is a species of moth in the family Arrhenophanidae. It probably occurs widely through the lowland Amazon rainforest. Currently it is known only from Guyana and southern Venezuela.

The length of the forewings is 4.1–6 mm for males. Adults are on wing from February to early March..
