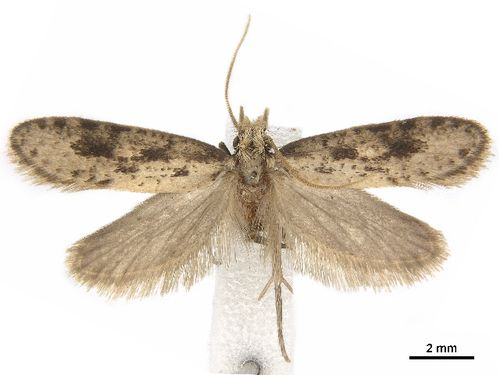

Scientific classification
- Kingdom: Animalia
- Phylum: Arthropoda
- Clade: Pancrustacea
- Class: Insecta
- Order: Lepidoptera
- Family: Tineidae
- Genus: Amydria
- Species: A. arizonella

Binomial name
- Amydria arizonella Dietz, 1905

= Amydria arizonella =

Species of moth

Amydria arizonella is a moth of the family Acrolophidae. It is found in North America, including Arizona and South Carolina.
