= Exoncotis umbraticella =

Scientific classification
- Domain: Eukaryota
- Kingdom: Animalia
- Phylum: Arthropoda
- Class: Insecta
- Order: Lepidoptera
- Family: Tineidae
- Genus: Exoncotis
- Species: E. umbraticella

Binomial name
- Exoncotis umbraticella (Busck, 1914)

Synonyms
- Amydria umbraticella Busck, 1914; Exoncotis increpans Meyrick, 1919

Species of moth

Exoncotis umbraticella is a moth of the family Acrolophidae. It is found in Panama and French Guiana.
