= Exoncotis gemistis =

Scientific classification
- Kingdom: Animalia
- Phylum: Arthropoda
- Class: Insecta
- Order: Lepidoptera
- Family: Tineidae
- Genus: Exoncotis
- Species: E. gemistis

Binomial name
- Exoncotis gemistis (Meyrick, 1909)

Synonyms
- Amydria gemistis Meyrick, 1909

Species of moth

Exoncotis gemistis is a moth of the family Acrolophidae. It is found in Bolivia.
