= Amydria anceps =

Scientific classification
- Kingdom: Animalia
- Phylum: Arthropoda
- Class: Insecta
- Order: Lepidoptera
- Family: Tineidae
- Genus: Amydria
- Species: A. anceps

Binomial name
- Amydria anceps Walsingham, 1914

Synonyms
- Acrolophus socialis Beutelspacher, 1977

Species of moth

Amydria anceps is a moth of the family Acrolophidae. It is found in Mexico.

It is unusual in that its caterpillars actually eat the discarded fungus culture grown by leaf-cutter ants, Atta mexicana; this moth is always (obligately) associated as a harmless guest on the nests of this ant species.
