= Dysoptus denticulatus =

Scientific classification
- Kingdom: Animalia
- Phylum: Arthropoda
- Class: Insecta
- Order: Lepidoptera
- Family: Psychidae
- Genus: Dysoptus
- Species: D. denticulatus

Binomial name
- Dysoptus denticulatus Davis, 2003

Species of moth

Dysoptus denticulatus is a species of moth in the family Arrhenophanidae. It is known only from Brazil, São Paulo, Boracéia Field Station, and Casa Grande.

The length of the forewings is about 5 mm for males. Adults are on wing in February (based on one record).

== Etymology ==
The specific name is derived from the Latin denticulatus (with small teeth), in reference to the denticulate apex of the saccular process in the male valva.
