= Dysoptus avittus =

Scientific classification
- Kingdom: Animalia
- Phylum: Arthropoda
- Class: Insecta
- Order: Lepidoptera
- Family: Psychidae
- Genus: Dysoptus
- Species: D. avittus

Binomial name
- Dysoptus avittus Davis, 2003

Species of moth

Dysoptus avittus is a species of moth in the family Arrhenophanidae. It is known only from the type locality in southern Brazil.

The length of the forewings is about 6 mm (0.24 in) for males. Adults are on wing in October (based on one record).
