= Ptilopsaltis synchorista =

Scientific classification
- Kingdom: Animalia
- Phylum: Arthropoda
- Class: Insecta
- Order: Lepidoptera
- Family: Tineidae
- Genus: Ptilopsaltis
- Species: P. synchorista

Binomial name
- Ptilopsaltis synchorista Meyrick, 1935

Species of moth

Ptilopsaltis synchorista is a moth of the family Acrolophidae. It is found in Trinidad.
