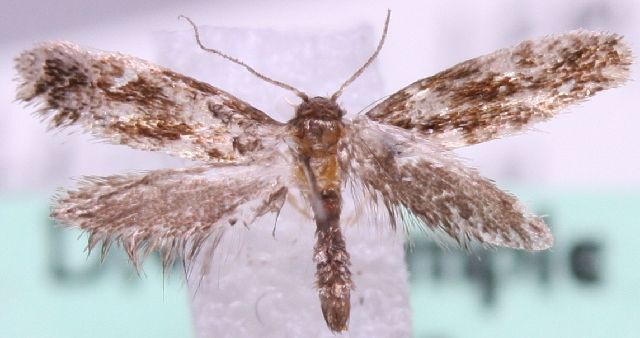
- Infurcitinea argentimaculella

Scientific classification
- Kingdom: Animalia
- Phylum: Arthropoda
- Clade: Pancrustacea
- Class: Insecta
- Order: Lepidoptera
- Family: Tineidae
- Genus: Infurcitinea; Spuler, 1910

Type species
- Tinea argentimaculella Stainton, 1849

Diversity
- 76 species

Synonyms
- Numerous, see text

= Infurcitinea =

Genus of moths

Infurcitinea is a genus of the fungus moth family, Tineidae. Therein, it belongs to the Meessiinae, one of the larger fungus moth subfamilies.

== Species ==
76 species were placed in Infurcitinea as of 2003, but new species are still being discovered regularly:

- Infurcitinea albanica G.Petersen, 1963
- Infurcitinea albicomella (Stainton, 1851)
- Infurcitinea albulella (Rebel, 1935)
- Infurcitinea amseli G.Petersen, 1957
- Infurcitinea anatolica Petersen, 1968
- Infurcitinea arenbergeri Gaedike, 1988
- Infurcitinea argentimaculella (Stainton, 1849)
- Infurcitinea atrifasciella (Staudinger, 1871)
- Infurcitinea banatica G.Petersen, 1961
- Infurcitinea belviella Gaedike, 1980
- Infurcitinea brunneopterella G.Petersen, 1964
- Infurcitinea captans Gozmány, 1960
- Infurcitinea cyprica G.Petersen & Gaedike, 1985
- Infurcitinea fasciella Gaedike, 1983
- Infurcitinea finalis Gozmány, 1959
- Infurcitinea frustigerella (Walsingham, 1907)
- Infurcitinea gaedikei Baldizzone, 1984
- Infurcitinea gaedikella Nel, 2003
- Infurcitinea graeca G.Petersen & Gaedike, 1983
- Infurcitinea grisea G.Petersen, 1973
- Infurcitinea hellenica Gaedike, 1997
- Infurcitinea ignicomella (Heydenreich, 1851)
- Infurcitinea incertula (Meyrick, 1928)
- Infurcitinea iranensis G.Petersen, 1964
- Infurcitinea italica (Amsel, 1954)
- Infurcitinea karadaghica Zagulayev, 1979
- Infurcitinea karmeliella Amsel, 1935
- Infurcitinea karsholti Gaedike, 1992
- Infurcitinea kasyi G.Petersen, 1962
- Infurcitinea klimeschi Passerin d'Entrèves, 1974
- Infurcitinea lakoniae Gaedike, 1983
- Infurcitinea lambessella G.Petersen, 1958
- Infurcitinea litochorella G.Petersen, 1964
- Infurcitinea longipennis Zagulayev, 1979
- Infurcitinea luteella Forbes, 1931
- Infurcitinea marcunella (Rebel, 1901)
- Infurcitinea marianii (Rebel, 1936)
- Infurcitinea maroccana G.Petersen & Gaedike, 1979
- Infurcitinea maura G.Petersen, 1962
- Infurcitinea media (Walsingham, 1907)
- Infurcitinea megalopterella G.Petersen, 1964
- Infurcitinea minuscula Gozmány, 1960
- Infurcitinea monteiroi Amsel, 1957
- Infurcitinea nedae Gaedike, 1983
- Infurcitinea nigropluviella (Walsingham, 1907)
- Infurcitinea nuristanica G.Petersen, 1963
- Infurcitinea obscura G.Petersen, 1973
- Infurcitinea obscuroides Gaedike, 1983
- Infurcitinea ochridella G.Petersen, 1962
- Infurcitinea olympica G.Petersen, 1958
- Infurcitinea palpella Forbes, 1931
- Infurcitinea parentii G.Petersen, 1964
- Infurcitinea parnassiella Gaedike, 1987
- Infurcitinea peterseni Baldizzone, 1984
- Infurcitinea quettaella G.Petersen, 1971
- Infurcitinea raddei G.Petersen, 1958
- Infurcitinea rebeliella (Krone, 1907)
- Infurcitinea reisseri G.Petersen, 1968
- Infurcitinea roesslerella (Heyden, 1865)
- Infurcitinea rumelicella (Rebel, 1903)
- Infurcitinea safedella G.Petersen, 1973
- Infurcitinea sardica (Amsel, 1951)
- Infurcitinea sardiniella Vári, 1942
- Infurcitinea senecae Gaedike, 1987
- Infurcitinea siciliana G.Petersen, 1964
- Infurcitinea tauridella G.Petersen, 1968
- Infurcitinea taurus Gaedike, 1988
- Infurcitinea teheranensis G.Petersen, 1971
- Infurcitinea teriolella (Amsel, 1954)
- Infurcitinea toechophila (Walsingham, 1908)
- Infurcitinea tribertii Gaedike, 1983
- Infurcitinea turcica G.Petersen, 1968
- Infurcitinea vanderwolfi Gaedike, 1997
- Infurcitinea vartianae G.Petersen, 1962
- Infurcitinea walsinghami G.Petersen, 1962
- Infurcitinea yildizae Koçak, 1981

== Synonyms ==
Many formerly independent genera have in more recent times been included in Infurcitinea. Some of them – e.g. Karsholtia, Omichlospora and Tineiforma – are still considered distinct by some authors today. But this seems hardly justified, as splitting off such small or even monotypic groups is liable to make Infurcitinea paraphyletic, and thus the following are usually treated as junior synonyms of the present genus:

- Atinea Amsel, 1954
- Atris Zagulayev, 1979
- Finalis Zagulayev, 1979
- Gozmanytinea Capuse, 1966
- Karsholtia Gaedike, 1986
- Microtinea Amsel, 1954
- Omichlospora Meyrick, 1928
- Pseudorumelis Sachkov, 1995
- Rumelis Zagulayev, 1979
- Tineiforma Amsel, 1952
