= Dysoptus pentalobus =

Scientific classification
- Domain: Eukaryota
- Kingdom: Animalia
- Phylum: Arthropoda
- Class: Insecta
- Order: Lepidoptera
- Family: Psychidae
- Genus: Dysoptus
- Species: D. pentalobus

Binomial name
- Dysoptus pentalobus Davis, 2003

Species of moth

Dysoptus pentalobus is a species of moth in the family Arrhenophanidae. It is known only from the type locality in the Atlantic coastal forests of south-eastern Brazil.

The length of the forewings is about 4.8 mm for males. Adults are on wing in late January (based on one record). It was first described by Donald R. Davis in 2003.

== Etymology ==
The specific name is derived from the Greek pente (five) and lobos (a rounded projection), in reference to the complex, five-lobed, saccular apex of the valva.
