= Amydria apachella =

Scientific classification
- Kingdom: Animalia
- Phylum: Arthropoda
- Class: Insecta
- Order: Lepidoptera
- Family: Tineidae
- Genus: Amydria
- Species: A. apachella

Binomial name
- Amydria apachella Dietz, 1905

Species of moth

Amydria apachella is a moth of the family Acrolophidae. It is found in North America, including the U.S. state of Arizona.
