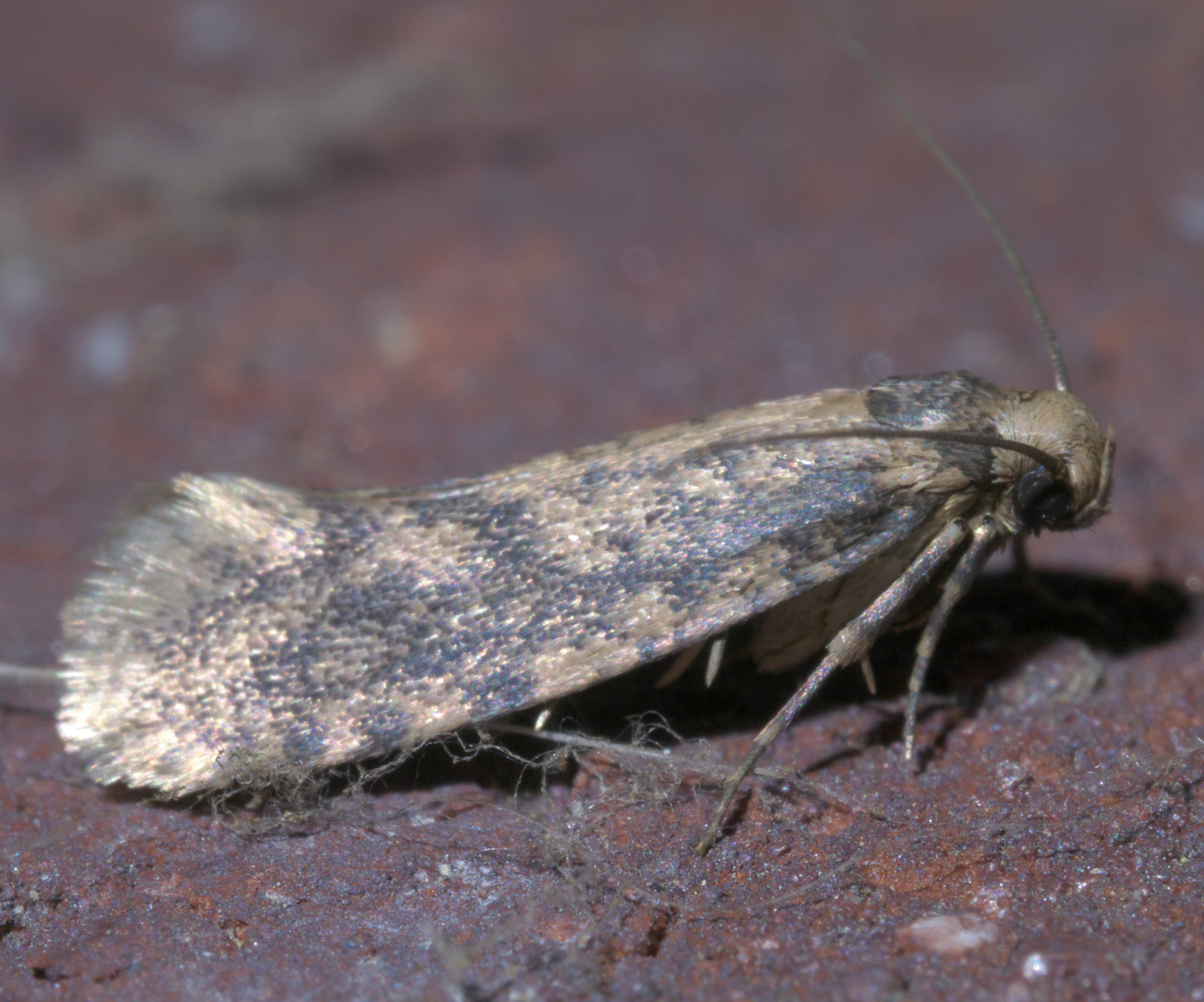

Scientific classification
- Domain: Eukaryota
- Kingdom: Animalia
- Phylum: Arthropoda
- Class: Insecta
- Order: Lepidoptera
- Family: Tineidae
- Genus: Amydria
- Species: A. effrentella

Binomial name
- Amydria effrentella Clemens, 1859

Synonyms
- Amydria effrenatella Stainton, 1872; Amydria coloradella Dietz, 1905

= Amydria effrentella =

Species of moth

Amydria effrentella is a moth of the family Acrolophidae. It is found in North America, including Alabama, Arizona, Arkansas, California, Georgia, Illinois, Indiana, Kentucky, Maryland, Massachusetts, Minnesota, Mississippi, Nevada, New Brunswick, New Jersey, New York, North Carolina, Ohio, Quebec, Saskatchewan, South Carolina, Tennessee, Utah, West Virginia and Wisconsin.

The wingspan is about 24 mm (0.94 in). The forewings are mottled and there is a dark patch at the end of the discal cell.

The larvae are detritivores, feeding on decaying leaves. They have been found within the remaining leaves of branches used in older Aplodontia rufa lodges.
