= Dysoptus sparsimaculatus =

Scientific classification
- Kingdom: Animalia
- Phylum: Arthropoda
- Class: Insecta
- Order: Lepidoptera
- Family: Psychidae
- Genus: Dysoptus
- Species: D. sparsimaculatus

Binomial name
- Dysoptus sparsimaculatus Davis, 2003

Species of moth

Dysoptus sparsimaculatus is a species of moth in the family Arrhenophanidae. It is known only from three montane sites in northern Venezuela.

The length of the forewings is 4.6–5 mm for males. Adults are on wing in January, April and August.

== Etymology ==
The specific name is derived from the Latin sparsus (few, rare) and maculata (spotted, marked), in reference to this species' almost immaculate wing pattern.
