= Dysoptus asymmetrus =

Scientific classification
- Domain: Eukaryota
- Kingdom: Animalia
- Phylum: Arthropoda
- Class: Insecta
- Order: Lepidoptera
- Family: Psychidae
- Genus: Dysoptus
- Species: D. asymmetrus

Binomial name
- Dysoptus asymmetrus Davis, 2003

Species of moth

Dysoptus asymmetrus is a species of moth in the family Arrhenophanidae. It is known only from the type locality in southern Venezuela, but it almost certainly will be found elsewhere in the lowland Amazon rainforest.

The length of the forewings is 4.4–4.7 millimetres (0.17–0.19 in) for males. Adults are on wing in early February (based on two records).
