= Amydria confusella =

Scientific classification
- Domain: Eukaryota
- Kingdom: Animalia
- Phylum: Arthropoda
- Class: Insecta
- Order: Lepidoptera
- Family: Tineidae
- Genus: Amydria
- Species: A. confusella

Binomial name
- Amydria confusella Dietz, 1905

Species of moth

Amydria confusella is a moth of the family Acrolophidae. It is found in North America, including California and Illinois.
