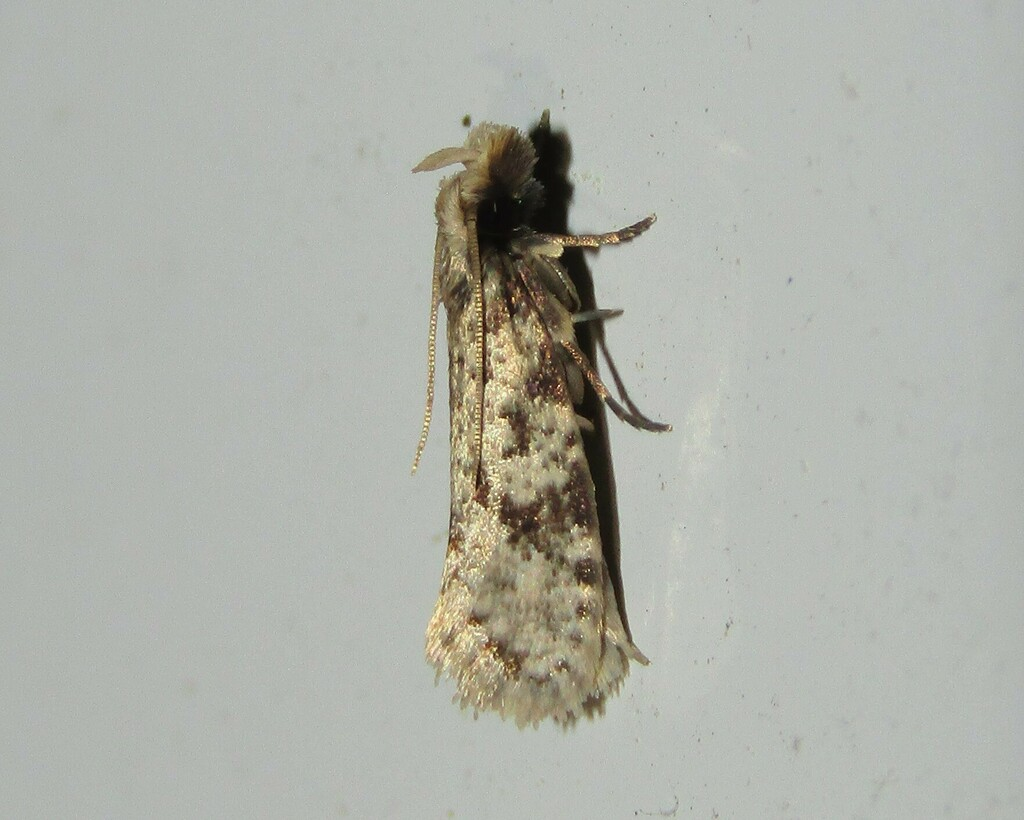

Scientific classification
- Kingdom: Animalia
- Phylum: Arthropoda
- Clade: Pancrustacea
- Class: Insecta
- Order: Lepidoptera
- Family: Tineidae
- Genus: Amydria
- Species: A. brevipennella

Binomial name
- Amydria brevipennella Dietz, 1905

= Amydria brevipennella =

Species of moth

Amydria brevipennella is a moth of the family Acrolophidae. It is found in North America, including Florida, Maryland, North Carolina, Ohio, Tennessee, Virginia and West Virginia.
