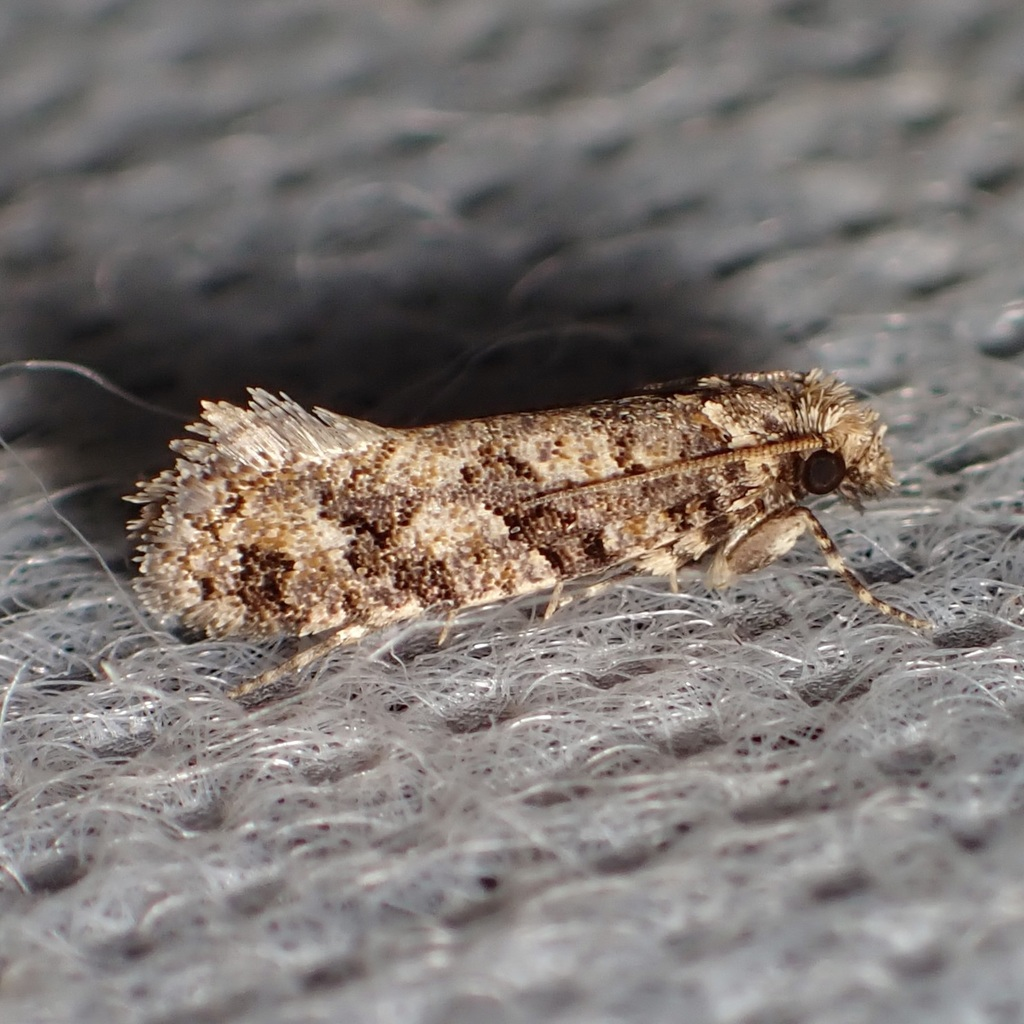

Scientific classification
- Kingdom: Animalia
- Phylum: Arthropoda
- Clade: Pancrustacea
- Class: Insecta
- Order: Lepidoptera
- Family: Tineidae
- Genus: Amydria
- Species: A. obliquella

Binomial name
- Amydria obliquella Dietz, 1905

= Amydria obliquella =

Species of moth

Amydria obliquella is a moth of the family Acrolophidae. It is found in parts of North America, such as Arizona, California, Manitoba, Maryland, New Mexico, Saskatchewan and Texas.
