= Dysoptus acuminatus =

Scientific classification
- Domain: Eukaryota
- Kingdom: Animalia
- Phylum: Arthropoda
- Class: Insecta
- Order: Lepidoptera
- Family: Psychidae
- Genus: Dysoptus
- Species: D. acuminatus

Binomial name
- Dysoptus acuminatus Davis, 2003

Species of moth

Dysoptus acuminatus is a species of moth in the family Arrhenophanidae. It is known only from the type locality in southern Venezuela, but it almost certainly will be found elsewhere in the lowland Amazon rainforest.

The length of the forewings is 5.7–6 mm for males. Adults are on wing in February.

== Etymology ==
The specific epithet is derived from the Latin acuminatus (pointed), in reference to the unique, relatively acute cucullus of the male valva.
