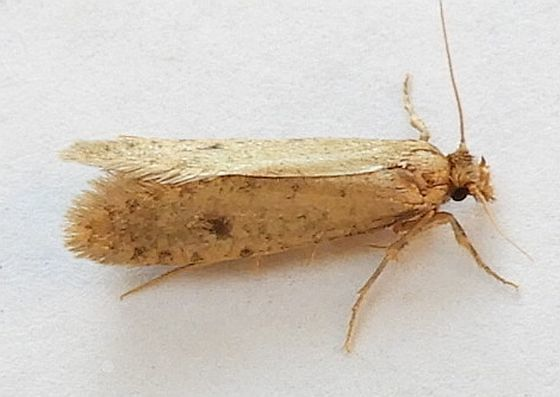

Scientific classification
- Kingdom: Animalia
- Phylum: Arthropoda
- Clade: Pancrustacea
- Class: Insecta
- Order: Lepidoptera
- Family: Tineidae
- Genus: Amydria
- Species: A. curvistrigella

Binomial name
- Amydria curvistrigella Dietz, 1905

Synonyms
- Amydria pandurella Dietz, 1905

= Amydria curvistrigella =

Species of moth

Amydria curvistrigella is a moth of the family Acrolophidae. It is found in North America, including California and Arizona.
