= Amydria onagella =

Scientific classification
- Domain: Eukaryota
- Kingdom: Animalia
- Phylum: Arthropoda
- Class: Insecta
- Order: Lepidoptera
- Family: Tineidae
- Genus: Amydria
- Species: A. onagella

Binomial name
- Amydria onagella Dietz, 1905

Synonyms
- Amydria occidentella Dietz, 1905

Species of moth

Amydria onagella is a moth of the family Acrolophidae. It is found in North America, including California.
