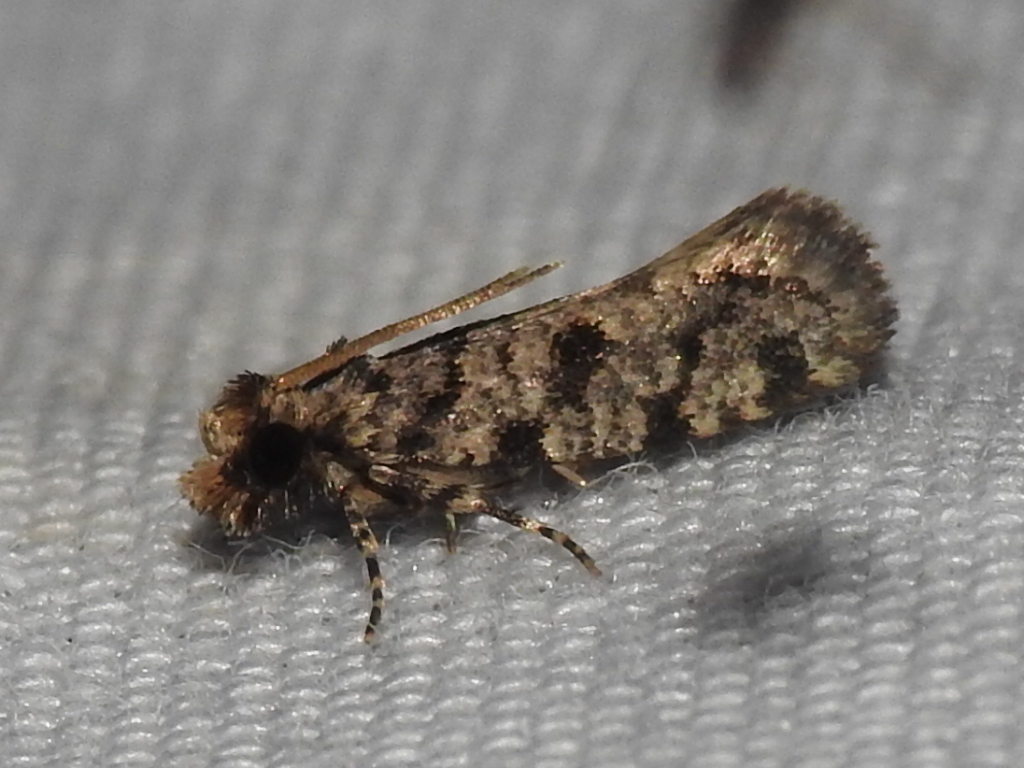

Scientific classification
- Kingdom: Animalia
- Phylum: Arthropoda
- Clade: Pancrustacea
- Class: Insecta
- Order: Lepidoptera
- Family: Tineidae
- Genus: Amydria
- Species: A. margoriella

Binomial name
- Amydria margoriella Dietz, 1905

Synonyms
- Amydria marjorieella Dietz, 1905; Amydria margorieella Dietz, 1905; Amydria marjoriella Busck, 1906

= Amydria margoriella =

Species of moth

Amydria margoriella is a moth of the family Acrolophidae. It is found in North America, including Florida, Kentucky, Ohio and Texas.

The wingspan is about 11 mm.
