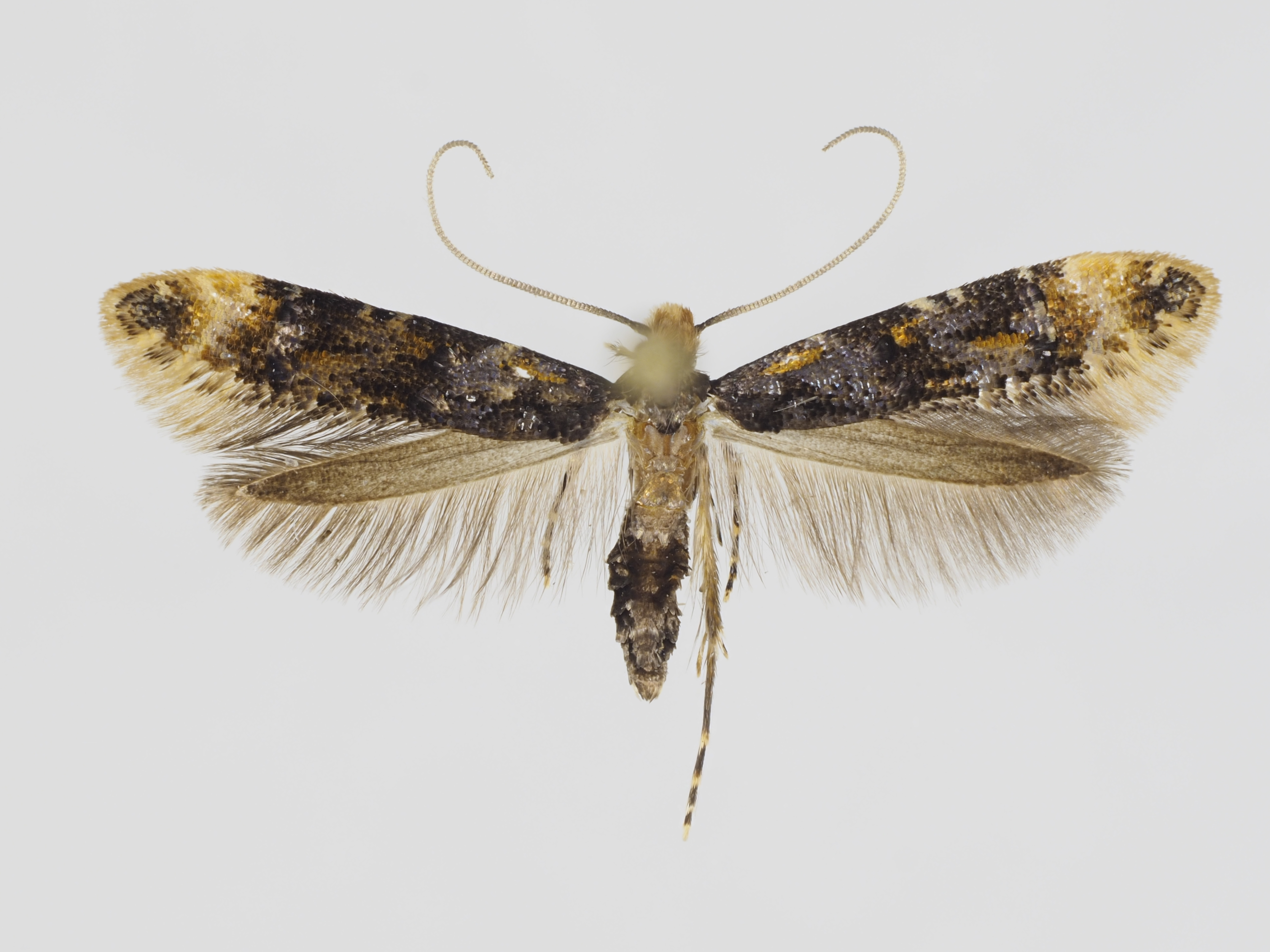
- Stenoptinea cyaneimarmorella

Scientific classification
- Kingdom: Animalia
- Phylum: Arthropoda
- Clade: Pancrustacea
- Class: Insecta
- Order: Lepidoptera
- Family: Tineidae
- Subfamily: Meessiinae
- Genus: Stenoptinea; Dietz, 1905

Type species
- Homosetia ornatella Dietz, 1905

Synonyms
- Celestica Meyrick, 1917

= Stenoptinea =

Genus of moths

Stenoptinea is a genus of the fungus moth family, Tineidae. Therein, it belongs to the subfamily Meessiinae. It was originally established as a subgenus of Homosetia, but later separated to become a genus in its own right.

Only three species are placed in Stenoptinea at present:

- Stenoptinea auriferella (Dietz, 1905)
- Stenoptinea cyaneimarmorella (Millière, 1854) (= S. angustipennis)
- Stenoptinea ornatella (Dietz, 1905)
