= Exoncotis resona =

Scientific classification
- Kingdom: Animalia
- Phylum: Arthropoda
- Class: Insecta
- Order: Lepidoptera
- Family: Tineidae
- Genus: Exoncotis
- Species: E. resona

Binomial name
- Exoncotis resona Meyrick, 1929

Species of moth

Exoncotis resona is a moth of the family Acrolophidae. It is found in Colombia.
