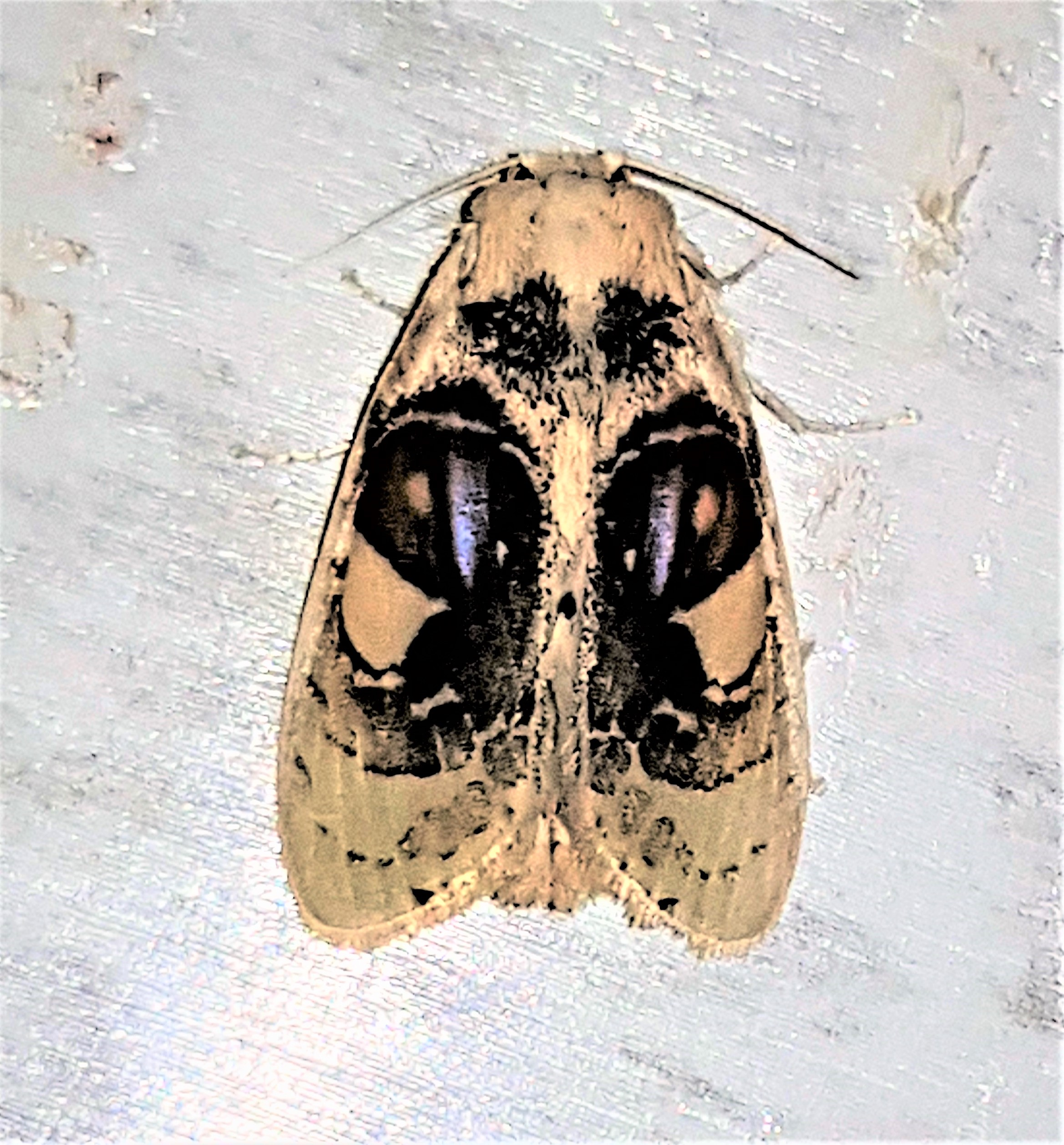

Scientific classification
- Kingdom: Animalia
- Phylum: Arthropoda
- Class: Insecta
- Order: Lepidoptera
- Family: Psychidae
- Genus: Arrhenophanes
- Species: A. perspicilla

Binomial name
- Arrhenophanes perspicilla (Stoll, 1790)

Synonyms
- Phalaena Bombyx perspicilla Stoll, 1790; Parathyris perspicilla; Dasychira perspicilla; Arrhenophanes inca Meyrick, 1913

= Arrhenophanes perspicilla =

Species of moth

Arrhenophanes perspicilla is a species of moth in the family Arrhenophanidae. It occurs throughout much of the lowland Neotropical Region from the state of Veracruz in Mexico to Misiones in Argentina and Rio Grande do Sul in southern Brazil. It is absent from the West Indies accept from Trinidad and Tobago
