= Amydria pauculella =

Scientific classification
- Kingdom: Animalia
- Phylum: Arthropoda
- Class: Insecta
- Order: Lepidoptera
- Family: Tineidae
- Genus: Amydria
- Species: A. pauculella

Binomial name
- Amydria pauculella (Walker, 1864)

Synonyms
- Casape pauculella Walker, 1864

Species of moth

Amydria pauculella is a moth of the family Acrolophidae. It is found in Venezuela.
