= Dysoptus prolatus =

Scientific classification
- Kingdom: Animalia
- Phylum: Arthropoda
- Class: Insecta
- Order: Lepidoptera
- Family: Psychidae
- Genus: Dysoptus
- Species: D. prolatus

Binomial name
- Dysoptus prolatus Davis, 2003

Species of moth

Dysoptus prolatus is a species of moth in the family Arrhenophanidae. It is known only from the type locality and mostly from primary forests of La Selva, Costa Rica.

The length of the forewings is 4-5.2 mm for males and about 7.8 mm for females. Adults are on wing in January, February, June, July and September.
