= Acrolophus guttatus =

Scientific classification
- Kingdom: Animalia
- Phylum: Arthropoda
- Class: Insecta
- Order: Lepidoptera
- Family: Tineidae
- Genus: Acrolophus
- Species: A. guttatus

Binomial name
- Acrolophus guttatus Davis, 1987

Species of moth

Acrolophus guttatus is a moth of the family Acrolophidae. It is found on Cuba.
