= Dysoptus probata =

Scientific classification
- Domain: Eukaryota
- Kingdom: Animalia
- Phylum: Arthropoda
- Class: Insecta
- Order: Lepidoptera
- Family: Psychidae
- Genus: Dysoptus
- Species: D. probata

Binomial name
- Dysoptus probata Walsingham, 1914

Species of moth

Dysoptus probata is a species of moth in the family Arrhenophanidae. It is known only from the type locality in south-western Guatemala.

The length of the forewings is about 8 mm for females.
