= Amydria clemensella =

Scientific classification
- Kingdom: Animalia
- Phylum: Arthropoda
- Clade: Pancrustacea
- Class: Insecta
- Order: Lepidoptera
- Family: Tineidae
- Genus: Amydria
- Species: A. clemensella

Binomial name
- Amydria clemensella Chambers, 1874

Species of moth

Amydria clemensella is a moth of the family Acrolophidae. It is found in North America.
