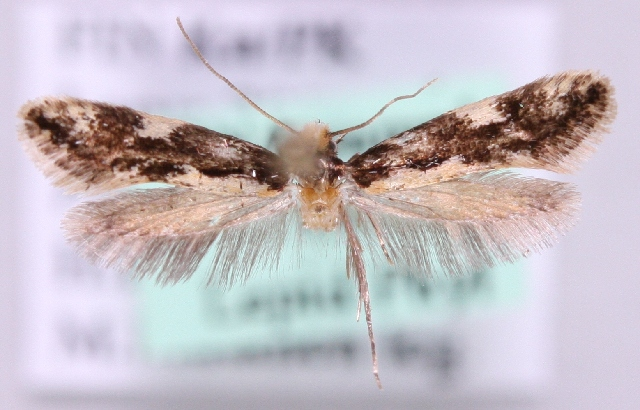

Scientific classification
- Domain: Eukaryota
- Kingdom: Animalia
- Phylum: Arthropoda
- Class: Insecta
- Order: Lepidoptera
- Superfamily: Tineoidea
- Family: Tineidae
- Genus: Agnathosia
- Species: A. mendicella

Binomial name
- Agnathosia mendicella (Denis & Schiffermüller, 1775)

Synonyms
- Tinea mendicella Denis & Schiffermüller, 1775; Agnathosia austriacella Amsel, 1954; Tinea flavimaculella Toll, 1942; Tinea propulsatella Rebel, 1892

= Agnathosia mendicella =

Species of moth

Agnathosia mendicella is a moth of the family Tineidae. It was described by Michael Denis and Ignaz Schiffermüller in 1775. It is found from Scandinavia south to Italy and from Germany east to Poland and Romania. It is also present in Russia.

The wingspan is 10–13 mm. Adults are on wing from June to August.
