= Arrhenophanes volcanica =

Scientific classification
- Kingdom: Animalia
- Phylum: Arthropoda
- Class: Insecta
- Order: Lepidoptera
- Family: Psychidae
- Genus: Arrhenophanes
- Species: A. volcanica

Binomial name
- Arrhenophanes volcanica Walsingham, 1913

Species of moth

Arrhenophanes volcanica is a species of moth in the family Arrhenophanidae. It is found in much of the lowland Neotropical Region, from the Mexican state of Veracruz to Rio Grande do Sul in southern Brazil. It is absent from the West Indies.

The length of the forewings is 11–16 mm for males and 16–22 mm for females. Adults of this species have been collected throughout the year.
