= Amydria selvae =

Scientific classification
- Kingdom: Animalia
- Phylum: Arthropoda
- Class: Insecta
- Order: Lepidoptera
- Family: Tineidae
- Genus: Amydria
- Species: A. selvae

Binomial name
- Amydria selvae Davis, 1986

Species of moth

Amydria selvae is a moth of the family Acrolophidae. It is found in Costa Rica.
