= Ptilopsaltis =

Scientific classification
- Domain: Eukaryota
- Kingdom: Animalia
- Phylum: Arthropoda
- Class: Insecta
- Order: Lepidoptera
- Family: Tineidae
- Subfamily: Acrolophinae
- Genus: Ptilopsaltis; Meyrick, 1935

Genus of moths

Ptilopsaltis is a genus of moths in the family Acrolophidae.

== Species ==
- Ptilopsaltis santarosae
- Ptilopsaltis synchorista
