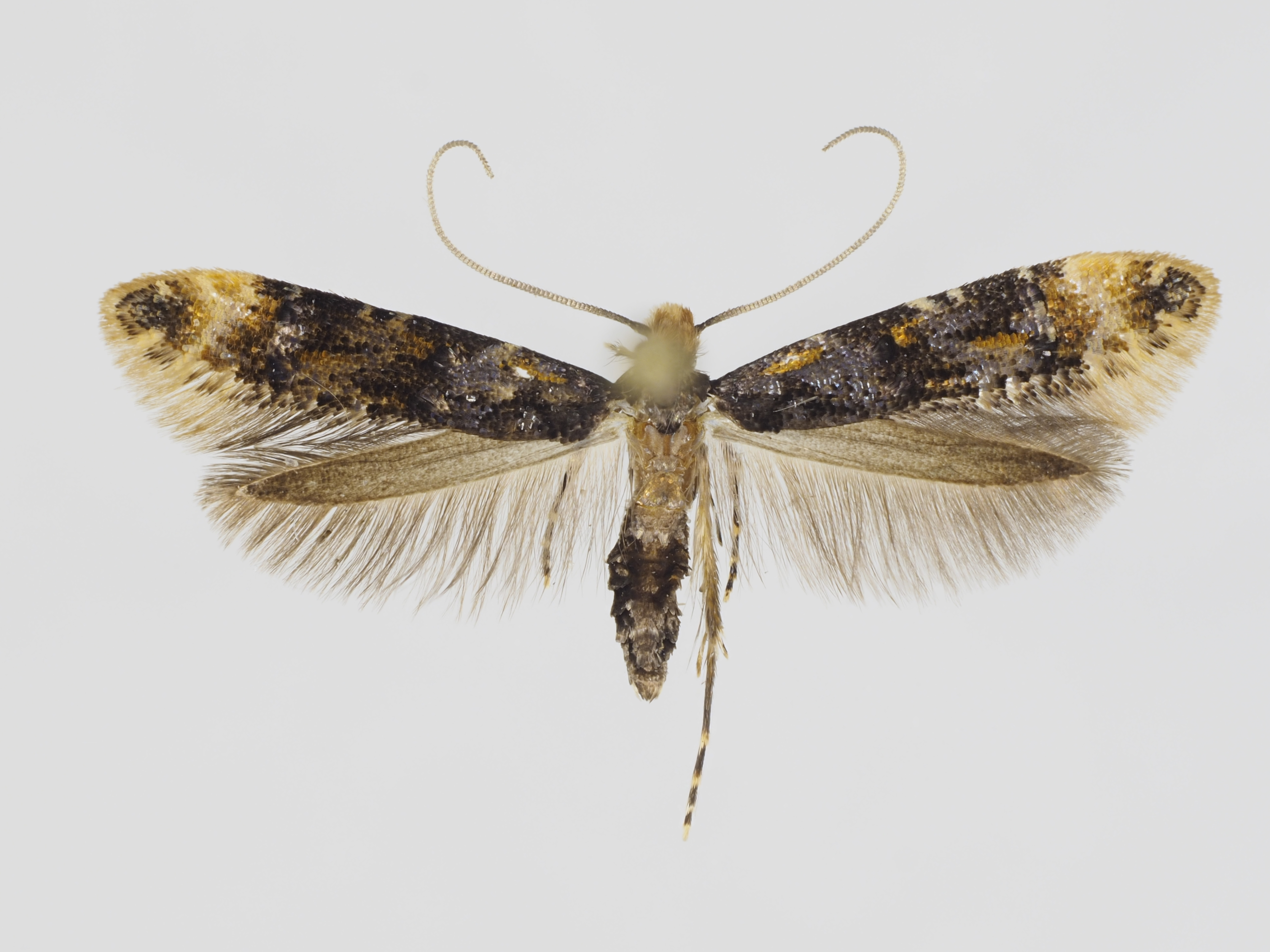

Scientific classification
- Domain: Eukaryota
- Kingdom: Animalia
- Phylum: Arthropoda
- Class: Insecta
- Order: Lepidoptera
- Family: Tineidae
- Genus: Stenoptinea
- Species: S. cyaneimarmorella

Binomial name
- Stenoptinea cyaneimarmorella (Millière, 1854)

= Stenoptinea cyaneimarmorella =

Species of moth

Stenoptinea cyaneimarmorella is a moth belonging to the family Tineidae. The species was first described by Pierre Millière in 1854.

It is native to Europe.
