= Xeringinia =

Scientific classification
- Kingdom: Animalia
- Phylum: Arthropoda
- Clade: Pancrustacea
- Class: Insecta
- Order: Lepidoptera
- Family: Tineidae
- Subfamily: Meessiinae
- Genus: Xeringinia

Genus of moths

Xeringinia is a genus of moths belonging to the family Tineidae.

There is only one species in this genus, Xeringinia altilis (Meyrick, 1893) that is restricted to Australia.
