= Eudarcia jaworskii =

Scientific classification
- Kingdom: Animalia
- Phylum: Arthropoda
- Clade: Pancrustacea
- Class: Insecta
- Order: Lepidoptera
- Family: Tineidae
- Genus: Eudarcia
- Species: E. jaworskii

Binomial name
- Eudarcia jaworskii Gaedike, 2011

Synonyms
- Eudarcia (Abchagleris) jaworskii

Species of moth

Eudarcia jaworskii is a moth of the family Tineidae. It is found in Turkey.

The wingspan is about 6 mm. The forewings are dark grey-brown with a whitish pattern. The hindwings are light grey.

== Etymology ==
The species is named in honour Tomasz Jaworski, who collected the species.
