= Drimylastis =

Scientific classification
- Kingdom: Animalia
- Phylum: Arthropoda
- Clade: Pancrustacea
- Class: Insecta
- Order: Lepidoptera
- Family: Tineidae
- Subfamily: Meessiinae
- Genus: Drimylastis; Meyrick, 1907

Synonyms
- Xyloscopa Meyrick, 1920

Genus of moths

Drimylastis is a genus of moths belonging to the family Tineidae.

== Species ==
- Drimylastis stiphropa Meyrick, 1924
- Drimylastis clausa Meyrick, 1919 (=Xyloscopa heterocrossa Meyrick, 1920)
- Drimylastis craterozona Meyrick, 1932
- Drimylastis telamonia Meyrick, 1907
