= Nannotinea =

Scientific classification
- Kingdom: Animalia
- Phylum: Arthropoda
- Clade: Pancrustacea
- Class: Insecta
- Order: Lepidoptera
- Family: Tineidae
- Subfamily: Meessiinae
- Genus: Nannotinea; Gozmány, 1966

Genus of moths

Nannotinea is a genus of moths belonging to the family Tineidae.

== Species ==
- Nannotinea holovalva Gozmány, 1968
- Nannotinea simplex Gozmány, 1966
