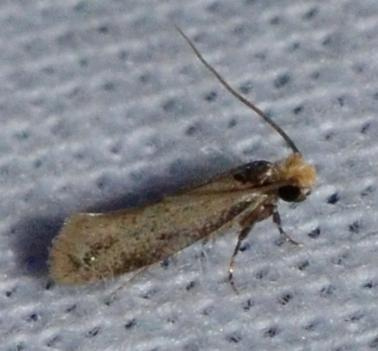

Scientific classification
- Kingdom: Animalia
- Phylum: Arthropoda
- Clade: Pancrustacea
- Class: Insecta
- Order: Lepidoptera
- Family: Tineidae
- Subfamily: Meessiinae
- Genus: Homostinea; Dietz, 1905

= Homostinea =

Genus of moths

Homostinea is a genus of moths belonging to the family Tineidae.

== Species ==
- Homostinea chersadacta Meyrick, 1932 (from Obidos, Para, Brazil)
- Homostinea curviliniella Dietz, 1905 (from USA)
