= Cnissostages mastictor =

Scientific classification
- Kingdom: Animalia
- Phylum: Arthropoda
- Class: Insecta
- Order: Lepidoptera
- Family: Psychidae
- Genus: Cnissostages
- Species: C. mastictor

Binomial name
- Cnissostages mastictor Bradley, 1951

Synonyms
- Cnissostages tantiliza Bradley, 1951

Species of moth

Cnissostages mastictor is a species of moth in the family Psychidae. It is found from Costa Rica to Peru.

The length of the forewings is 18.5-27.5 mm for males and 28–23 mm for females.
