= Cnissostages =

Scientific classification
- Kingdom: Animalia
- Phylum: Arthropoda
- Clade: Pancrustacea
- Class: Insecta
- Order: Lepidoptera
- Family: Psychidae
- Subfamily: Arrhenophaninae
- Genus: Cnissostages; Zeller, 1863

Genus of moths

Cnissostages is a genus of moths in the family Psychidae.

== Species ==
- Cnissostages oleagina Zeller, 1863
- Cnissostages mastictor Bradley, 1951
- Cnissostages osae Davis, 2003
