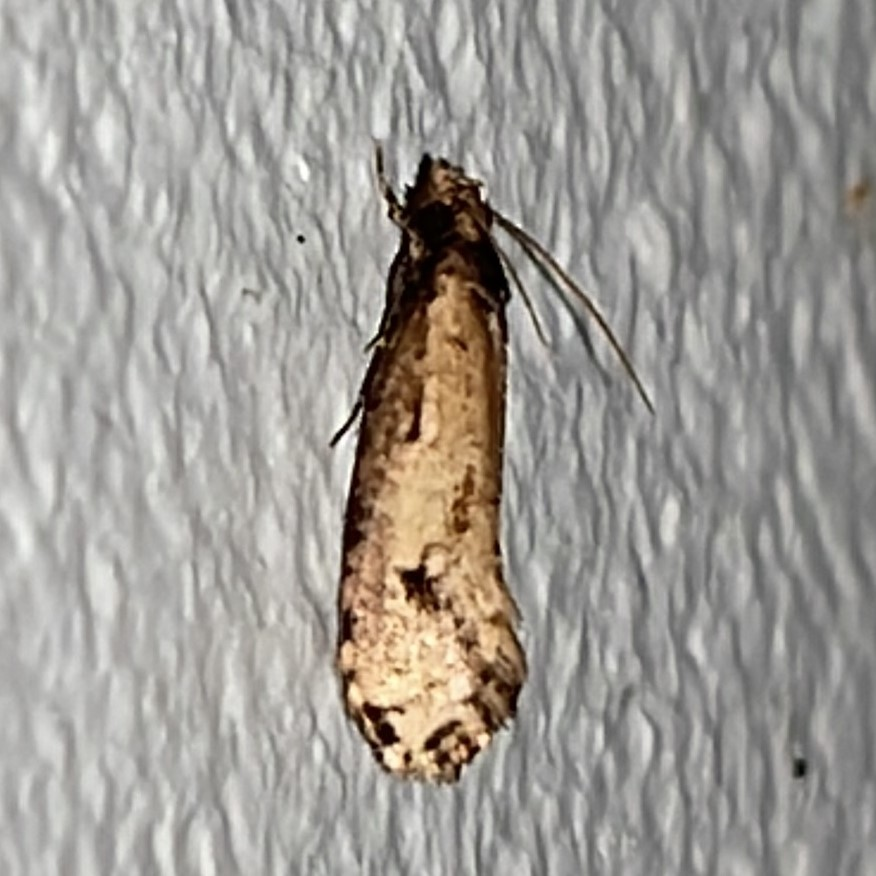

Scientific classification
- Kingdom: Animalia
- Phylum: Arthropoda
- Clade: Pancrustacea
- Class: Insecta
- Order: Lepidoptera
- Family: Tineidae
- Subfamily: Acrolophinae
- Genus: Exoncotis; Meyrick, 1919

= Exoncotis =

Genus of moths

Exoncotis is a genus of moths in the family Acrolophidae.

== Species ==
- Exoncotis gemistis Meyrick, 1909
- Exoncotis increpans Meyrick, 1919
- Exoncotis resona Meyrick, 1929
- Exoncotis umbraticella Busck, 1914
