= Infurcitinea tauridella =

Scientific classification
- Domain: Eukaryota
- Kingdom: Animalia
- Phylum: Arthropoda
- Class: Insecta
- Order: Lepidoptera
- Family: Tineidae
- Genus: Infurcitinea
- Species: I. tauridella

Binomial name
- Infurcitinea tauridella Petersen, 1968

Species of moth

Infurcitinea tauridella is a moth of the family Tineidae. It is found in Bulgaria, Greece, Turkey and the eastern part of European Russia.
