= Palaeophanes =

Scientific classification
- Kingdom: Animalia
- Phylum: Arthropoda
- Class: Insecta
- Order: Lepidoptera
- Family: Psychidae
- Subfamily: Arrhenophaninae
- Genus: Palaeophanes; Davis, 2003

Genus of moths

Palaeophanes is a genus of moths in the family Psychidae.

== Species ==
- Palaeophanes brevispina Davis, 2003
- Palaeophanes lativalva Davis, 2003
- Palaeophanes taiwanensis Davis, 2003
- Palaeophanes xoutha Davis, 2003
