= Palaeophanes taiwanensis =

Scientific classification
- Kingdom: Animalia
- Phylum: Arthropoda
- Class: Insecta
- Order: Lepidoptera
- Family: Psychidae
- Genus: Palaeophanes
- Species: P. taiwanensis

Binomial name
- Palaeophanes taiwanensis Davis, 2003

Species of moth

Palaeophanes taiwanensis is a species of moth in the family Psychidae. It is found in wet forests within the central mountain range of Taiwan at elevations of 700 to 1000 m.

The length of the forewings is 4.8-5.8 mm for males and about 9 mm for females.

== Etymology ==
The specific name denotes the country of origin of the type material.
