= Palaeophanes brevispina =

Scientific classification
- Kingdom: Animalia
- Phylum: Arthropoda
- Class: Insecta
- Order: Lepidoptera
- Family: Psychidae
- Genus: Palaeophanes
- Species: P. brevispina

Binomial name
- Palaeophanes brevispina Davis, 2003

Species of moth

Palaeophanes brevispina is a species of moth in the family Psychidae. It is only known from Brunei.

The length of the forewings is about 6 mm for males.

== Etymology ==
The specific epithet is said to derived from the Latin brevi (short) and spina (thorn), in reference to the diagnostic short, subapical spine on the male valva. The proper word in classical Latin for "short" is however brevis (masculine/feminine) or breve (neuter).
