= Palaeophanes lativalva =

Scientific classification
- Kingdom: Animalia
- Phylum: Arthropoda
- Class: Insecta
- Order: Lepidoptera
- Family: Psychidae
- Genus: Palaeophanes
- Species: P. lativalva

Binomial name
- Palaeophanes lativalva Davis, 2003

Species of moth

Palaeophanes lativalva is a species of moth in the family Psychidae. It is only known from the type locality, which is situated in a wet forested area in the central mountain range of Taiwan, at an elevation of about 1,400 m.

The length of the forewings is 4.7–5 mm for males.
