= Notiophanes =

Scientific classification
- Kingdom: Animalia
- Phylum: Arthropoda
- Clade: Pancrustacea
- Class: Insecta
- Order: Lepidoptera
- Family: Psychidae
- Subfamily: Arrhenophaninae
- Genus: Notiophanes; Davis and Edwards, 2003
- Species: N. fuscata

Binomial name
- Notiophanes fuscata Davis and Edwards, 2003

Genus of moths

Notiophanes is a genus of moths in the family Arrhenophanidae, consisting of only one species Notiophanes fuscata, which is endemic to Queensland, Australia. It is only known from a single female specimen.

The length of the forewing is about 27 mm. Adults are on wing in February, but this may be a longer period.
