= Cnissostages osae =

Scientific classification
- Kingdom: Animalia
- Phylum: Arthropoda
- Class: Insecta
- Order: Lepidoptera
- Family: Psychidae
- Genus: Cnissostages
- Species: C. osae

Binomial name
- Cnissostages osae Davis, 2003

Species of moth

Cnissostages osae is a species of moth in the family Psychidae. It is known only from the Osa Peninsula in southern Costa Rica.

The length of the forewings is about 11 mm for males. Adults are on wing in February, April and May.

== Etymology ==
The species name is derived from the general type locality, located on the Osa Peninsula of Costa Rica.
