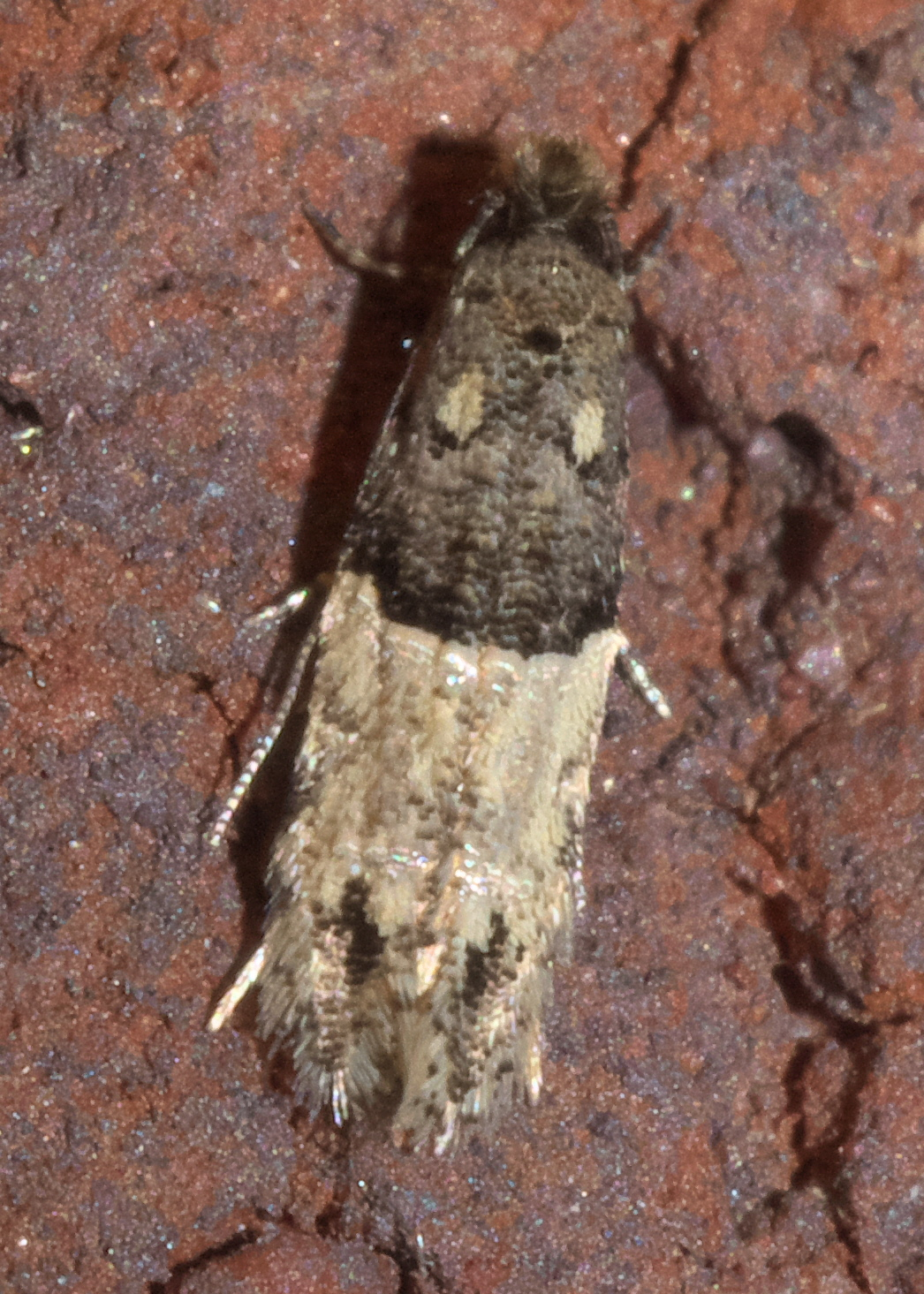

Scientific classification
- Kingdom: Animalia
- Phylum: Arthropoda
- Clade: Pancrustacea
- Class: Insecta
- Order: Lepidoptera
- Family: Tineidae
- Genus: Oenoe
- Species: O. hybromella

Binomial name
- Oenoe hybromella Chambers, 1874

= Oenoe hybromella =

Species of moth

Oenoe hybromella is a species of clothes moth in the family Tineidae.

The MONA or Hodges number for Oenoe hybromella is 0283.

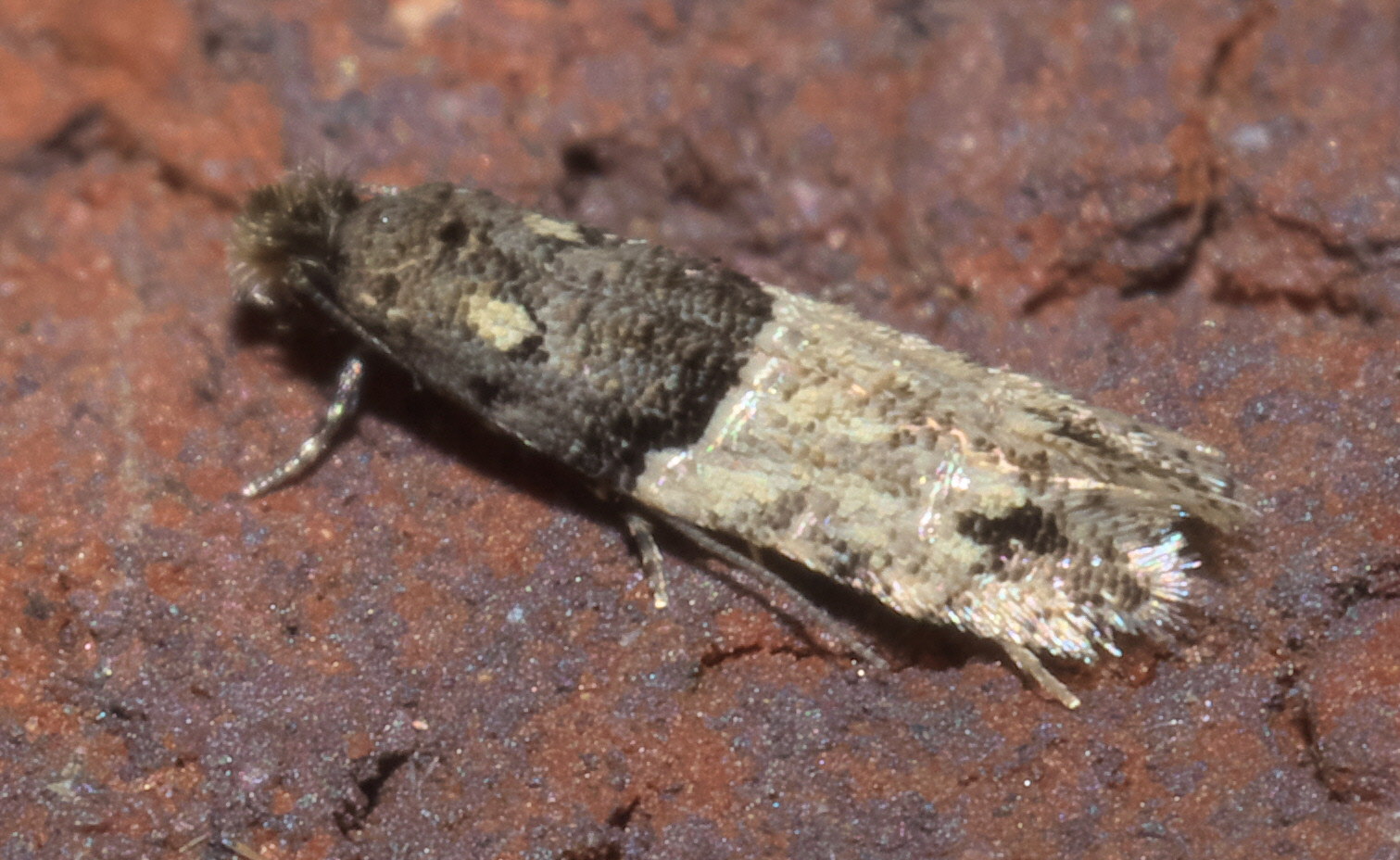
