= Drastea =

Scientific classification
- Domain: Eukaryota
- Kingdom: Animalia
- Phylum: Arthropoda
- Class: Insecta
- Order: Lepidoptera
- Family: Tineidae
- Subfamily: Acrolophinae
- Genus: Drastea; Walsingham, 1914
- Species: D. mexica

Binomial name
- Drastea mexica Walsingham, 1914

Genus of moths

Drastea is a monotypic genus of moth in the family Acrolophidae. The genus consists of only one species, Drastea mexica, which is found in Mexico.
