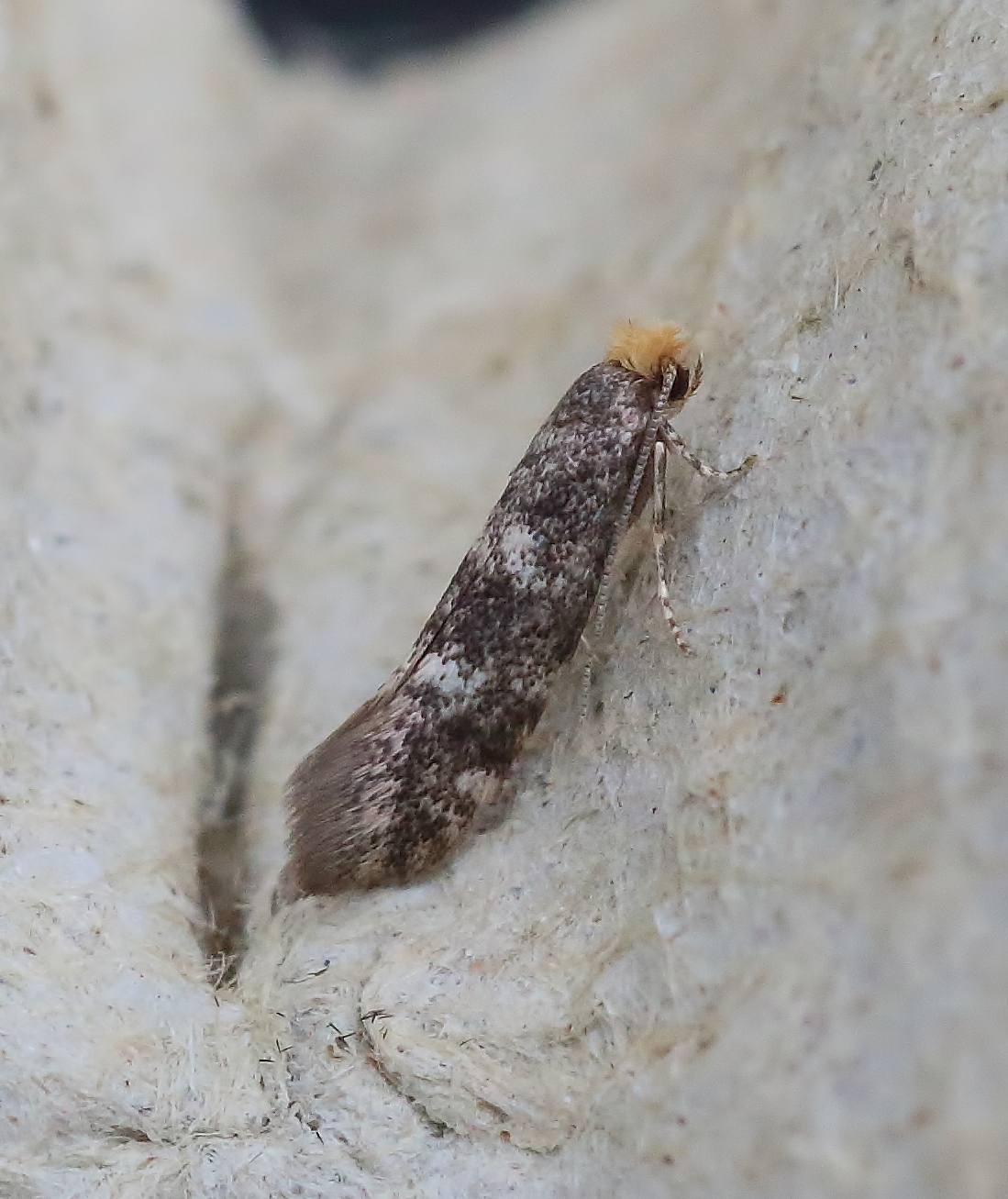

Scientific classification
- Domain: Eukaryota
- Kingdom: Animalia
- Phylum: Arthropoda
- Class: Insecta
- Order: Lepidoptera
- Family: Tineidae
- Genus: Infurcitinea
- Species: I. ignicomella

Binomial name
- Infurcitinea ignicomella (Heydenreich, 1851)

Synonyms
- Tinea ignicomella Heydenreich, 1851; Tinea corticella Tengström, 1848; Tinea flavicapilla Zeller, 1852

= Infurcitinea ignicomella =

Species of moth

Infurcitinea ignicomella is a moth of the family Tineidae. It was described by Heydenreich in 1851. It is found in large parts of Europe, except Ireland, Great Britain, Belgium, the Iberian Peninsula, Ukraine and most of the Balkan Peninsula.

The wingspan is 8–12 mm. Adults are on wing from May to August.

The larvae possibly feed on animal matter.
