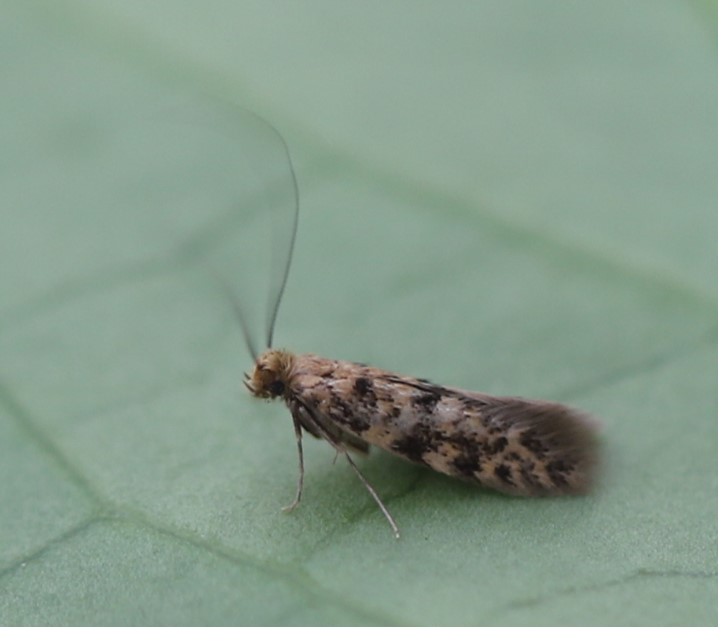
- Tenaga rhenania

Scientific classification
- Kingdom: Animalia
- Phylum: Arthropoda
- Clade: Pancrustacea
- Class: Insecta
- Order: Lepidoptera
- Family: Tineidae
- Subfamily: Meessiinae
- Genus: Tenaga; Clemens, 1862

Type species
- Tenaga pomiliella Clemens, 1862

Synonyms
- Lichenovora Petersen, 1957; Macraeola Meyrick, 1893

= Tenaga =

Genus of moths

Tenaga is a genus of moths belonging to the family Tineidae.

== Species ==
This genus includes the following species:

- Tenaga nigripunctella (Haworth, 1828)
- Tenaga pomiliella Clemens, 1862
- Tenaga rhenania (Petersen, 1962)
