= Infurcitinea vanderwolfi =

Scientific classification
- Kingdom: Animalia
- Phylum: Arthropoda
- Clade: Pancrustacea
- Class: Insecta
- Order: Lepidoptera
- Family: Tineidae
- Genus: Infurcitinea
- Species: I. vanderwolfi

Binomial name
- Infurcitinea vanderwolfi Gaedike, 1997

Species of moth

Infurcitinea vanderwolfi is a moth of the family Tineidae. It is found in Bulgaria, Greece and Croatia.
