= Unilepidotricha =

Scientific classification
- Kingdom: Animalia
- Phylum: Arthropoda
- Clade: Pancrustacea
- Class: Insecta
- Order: Lepidoptera
- Family: Tineidae
- Subfamily: Meessiinae
- Genus: Unilepidotricha; Xiao et Li, 2008
- Species: U. gracilicurva

Binomial name
- Unilepidotricha gracilicurva Xiao et Li, 2008

Genus of moths

Unilepidotricha is a genus of moths belonging to the family Tineidae. It contains only one species, Unilepidotricha gracilicurva, which is found in Yunnan in China.
