= Cnissostages oleagina =

Scientific classification
- Kingdom: Animalia
- Phylum: Arthropoda
- Clade: Pancrustacea
- Class: Insecta
- Order: Lepidoptera
- Family: Psychidae
- Genus: Cnissostages
- Species: C. oleagina

Binomial name
- Cnissostages oleagina Zeller, 1863

Species of moth

Cnissostages oleagina is a species of moth in the family Psychidae. It has a wide range in the Neotropical Region from Sinaloa, Mexico to southern Brazil and Paraguay.

The length of the forewings is 8–19 mm for males and 18–22 mm for females. Collection records indicate that the adults are generally active throughout the year. Captures have been reported for every month except August and September.

The larvae feed on tree fungi.
