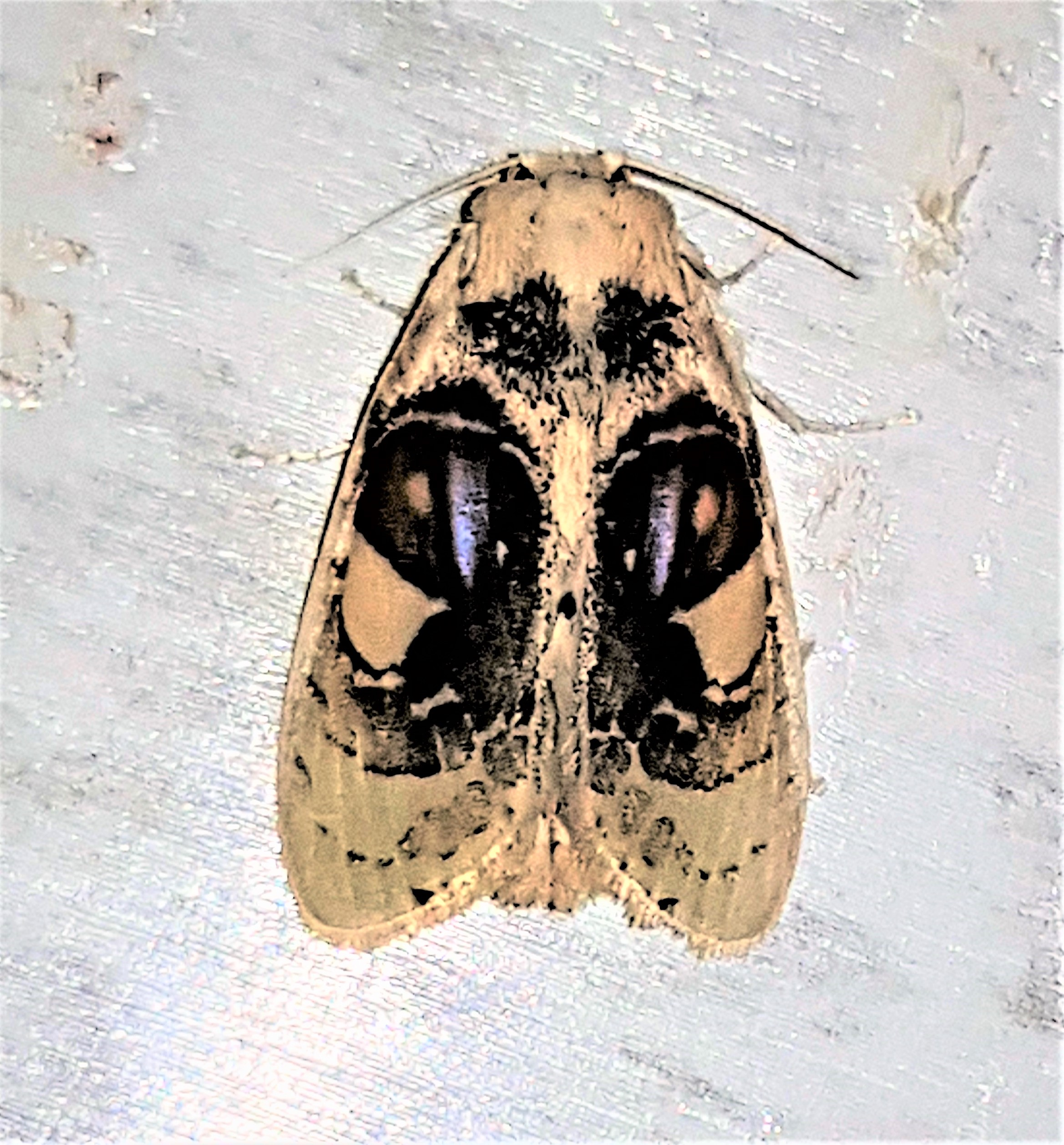

Scientific classification
- Kingdom: Animalia
- Phylum: Arthropoda
- Clade: Pancrustacea
- Class: Insecta
- Order: Lepidoptera
- Family: Psychidae
- Subfamily: Arrhenophaninae
- Genus: Arrhenophanes; Walsingham, 1913

= Arrhenophanes =

Genus of moths

Arrhenophanes is a genus of moths in the family Arrhenophanidae. Its species occur in Central and South America.

== Species ==
- Arrhenophanes perspicilla (Stoll, 1790)
- Arrhenophanes volcanica Walsingham, 1913
