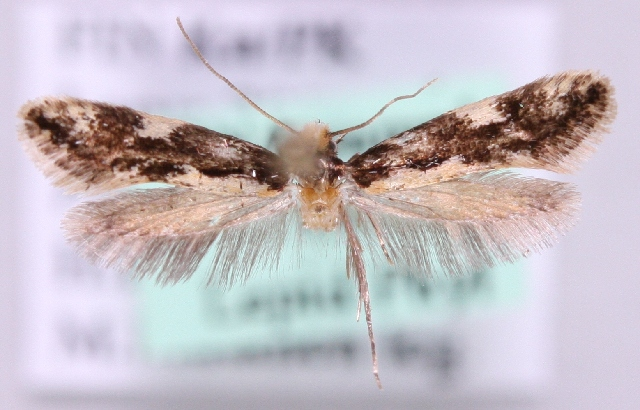
- Agnathosia mendicella

Scientific classification
- Kingdom: Animalia
- Phylum: Arthropoda
- Clade: Pancrustacea
- Class: Insecta
- Order: Lepidoptera
- Superfamily: Tineoidea
- Family: Tineidae
- Genus: Agnathosia; Amsel, 1954

Type species
- Agnathosia austriacella Amsel, 1954

= Agnathosia =

Genus of moths

Agnathosia is a genus of moths belonging to the family Tineidae.

Species: Some species of this genus are:

- Agnathosia byrsinopa (Meyrick, 1933) (from Sierra Leone and Sénégal)
- Agnathosia chasanica Gaedike, 2000
- Agnothosia propulsatella Rebel, 1892
- Agnathosia mendicella Hübner, 1796) (from Europe/Russia)
- Agnathosia nana Bippus, 2020
- Agnathosia obisaggitalis Xiao & Li, 2011 (from China and Japan)
- Agnathosia sandoensis Jonasson, 1977 (from Sweden)
