= Dysoptus =

Scientific classification
- Kingdom: Animalia
- Phylum: Arthropoda
- Class: Insecta
- Order: Lepidoptera
- Family: Psychidae
- Subfamily: Arrhenophaninae
- Genus: Dysoptus; Walsingham, 1913

Synonyms
- Ecpathophanes Bradley, 1951

Genus of moths

Dysoptus is a genus of moths in the family Psychidae.

== Species ==
- Dysoptus acuminatus Davis, 2003
- Dysoptus anachoreta (Bradley, 1951)
- Dysoptus argus Davis, 2003
- Dysoptus asymmetrus Davis, 2003
- Dysoptus avittus Davis, 2003
- Dysoptus bilobus Davis, 2003
- Dysoptus chiquitus (Buschk, 1914)
- Dysoptus denticulatus Davis, 2003
- Dysoptus fasciatus Davis, 2003
- Dysoptus pentalobus Davis, 2003
- Dysoptus probata Walsingham, 1914
- Dysoptus prolatus Davis, 2003
- Dysoptus pseudargus Davis, 2003
- Dysoptus sparsimaculatus Davis, 2003
- Dysoptus spilacris Davis, 2003
- Dysoptus tantalota Meyrick, 1919
