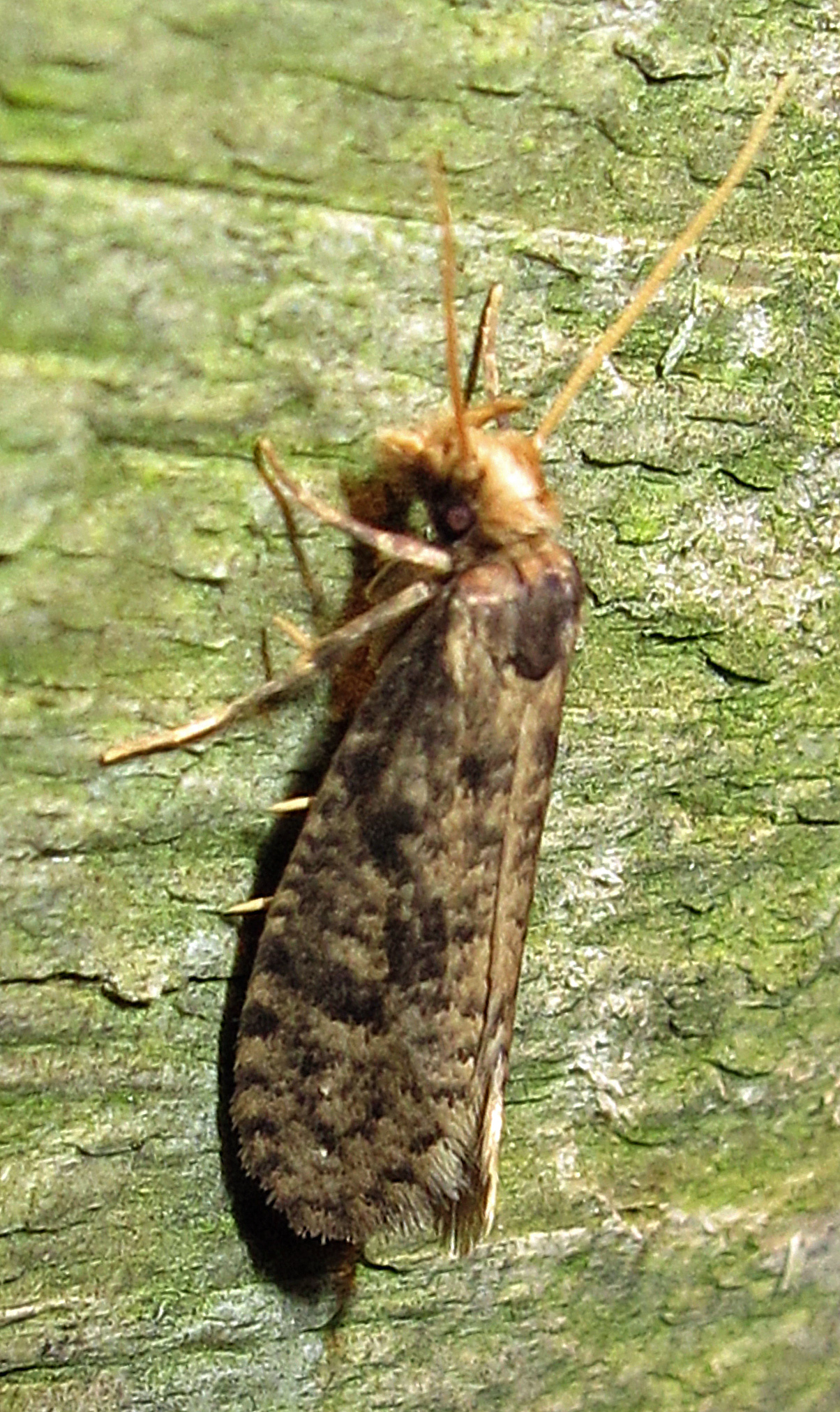

Scientific classification
- Kingdom: Animalia
- Phylum: Arthropoda
- Class: Insecta
- Order: Lepidoptera
- Family: Tineidae
- Subfamily: Acrolophinae
- Genus: Amydria; Clemens, 1859

Species
- Casape Walker, 1864; Neomeristis Meyrick, 1919

= Amydria =

Genus of moths

Amydria is a genus of moths in the family Acrolophidae.

== Species ==
- Amydria abscensella
- Amydria anceps
- Amydria apachella
- Amydria arizonella
- Amydria brevipennella
- Amydria clemensella
- Amydria confusella
- Amydria curvistrigella
- Amydria dyarella
- Amydria effrentella
- Amydria margoriella
- Amydria meridionalis
- Amydria muricolor
- Amydria obliquella
- Amydria onagella
- Amydria pauculella
- Amydria pogonites
- Amydria selvae
- Amydria taracta
