= Dysoptus argus =

Scientific classification
- Domain: Eukaryota
- Kingdom: Animalia
- Phylum: Arthropoda
- Class: Insecta
- Order: Lepidoptera
- Family: Psychidae
- Genus: Dysoptus
- Species: D. argus

Binomial name
- Dysoptus argus Davis, 2003

Species of moth

Dysoptus argus is a species of moth in the family Arrhenophanidae. It has a wide range in lowland wet forests of the Amazonian Region of northern South America from southern Venezuela and Guyana to Peru and Brazil.

The length of the forewings is 5.5–7.2 mm for males and 10.1–12 mm for females.
