= Eudarcia alanyacola =

Scientific classification
- Kingdom: Animalia
- Phylum: Arthropoda
- Clade: Pancrustacea
- Class: Insecta
- Order: Lepidoptera
- Family: Tineidae
- Genus: Eudarcia
- Species: E. alanyacola

Binomial name
- Eudarcia alanyacola Gaedike, 2011

Synonyms
- Eudarcia (Neomeessia) alanyacola

Species of moth

Eudarcia alanyacola is a moth of the family Tineidae. It is found in Turkey.

The wingspan is about 5 mm. The forewings are dark-brown with numerous cream scales, but without a clear pattern. The hindwings are grey.

== Etymology ==
The species is named after the locality where the holotype was collected.
