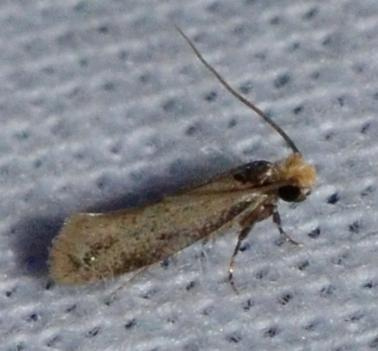

Scientific classification
- Kingdom: Animalia
- Phylum: Arthropoda
- Clade: Pancrustacea
- Class: Insecta
- Order: Lepidoptera
- Family: Tineidae
- Genus: Homostinea
- Species: H. curviliniella

Binomial name
- Homostinea curviliniella Dietz, 1905

= Homostinea curviliniella =

Species of moth

Homostinea curviliniella is a moth of the family Tineidae. It is found in Cuba and North America, where it has been recorded from most of the eastern half of the United States and Arizona.

The wingspan is about 8 mm. The forewings are sordid yellowish, dusted with fuscous and with the basal part of the extreme costa dark fuscous. The fuscous dusting is condensed along the costa, except its last fifth. The extreme base and particularly the anal angle is blackish and there is a blackish spot in the costal half of wing, before the middle. There is also a curved black line, more or less interrupted, in the middle of the apical third, curved towards and somewhat nearer to the dorsal margin. There are some scattered scales, more pronounced along the dorsal margin and in the apical part of the wing are some scattered whitish scales. The hindwings are greyish fuscous with a feeble brassy lustre towards the apex.
