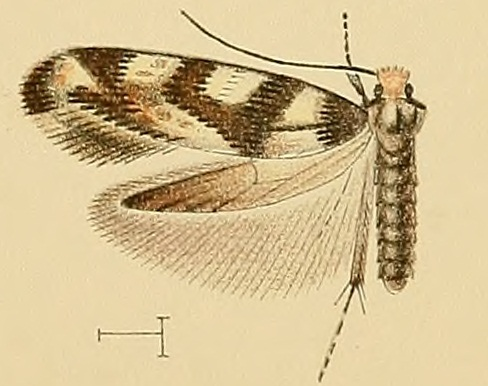

Scientific classification
- Kingdom: Animalia
- Phylum: Arthropoda
- Class: Insecta
- Order: Lepidoptera
- Family: Tineidae
- Genus: Infurcitinea
- Species: I. toechophila

Binomial name
- Infurcitinea toechophila (Walsingham, 1908)

Synonyms
- Tinea toechophila Walsingham, 1908

= Infurcitinea toechophila =

Species of moth

Infurcitinea toechophila is a moth of the family Tineidae. It is found on the Canary Islands.

The wingspan is 12–20 mm. The forewings are dark chocolate-brown with clearly defined silvery white markings. The hindwings are pale shining greyish.

The larvae possibly feed on lichen.
