= Infurcitinea amseli =

Scientific classification
- Domain: Eukaryota
- Kingdom: Animalia
- Phylum: Arthropoda
- Class: Insecta
- Order: Lepidoptera
- Family: Tineidae
- Genus: Infurcitinea
- Species: I. amseli

Binomial name
- Infurcitinea amseli Petersen, 1957

Species of moth

Infurcitinea amseli is a moth of the family Tineidae. It is found in Jordan, Turkmenistan, Pakistan, Afghanistan and Iran.
