= Palaeophanes xoutha =

Scientific classification
- Kingdom: Animalia
- Phylum: Arthropoda
- Class: Insecta
- Order: Lepidoptera
- Family: Psychidae
- Genus: Palaeophanes
- Species: P. xoutha

Binomial name
- Palaeophanes xoutha Davis, 2003

Species of moth

Palaeophanes xoutha is a species of moth in the family Psychidae. It is only known from Malaysia.

The length of the forewings is about 6 mm for males.

== Etymology ==
The specific name is derived from the Greek xouthos (yellowish brown), in reference to the predominantly yellowish-brown color of the adult.
