= Infurcitinea albicomella =

Scientific classification
- Domain: Eukaryota
- Kingdom: Animalia
- Phylum: Arthropoda
- Class: Insecta
- Order: Lepidoptera
- Family: Tineidae
- Genus: Infurcitinea
- Species: I. albicomella

Binomial name
- Infurcitinea albicomella (Stainton, 1851)

Species of butterfly

Infurcitinea albicomella is a species of moth belonging to the family Tineidae.

It is native to Europe.
