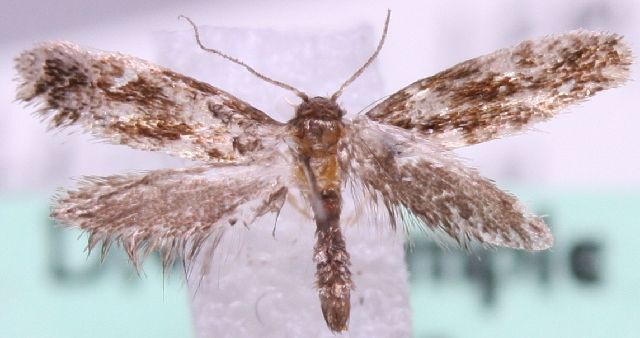

Scientific classification
- Kingdom: Animalia
- Phylum: Arthropoda
- Clade: Pancrustacea
- Class: Insecta
- Order: Lepidoptera
- Family: Tineidae
- Genus: Infurcitinea
- Species: I. argentimaculella

Binomial name
- Infurcitinea argentimaculella (Stainton, 1849)

Synonyms
- Tinea argentimaculella Stainton, 1849; Tinea niveistrigella Heinemann, 1854; Tinea sequella Haworth, 1828; Tinea vinculimarginella Bruand, [1854]

= Infurcitinea argentimaculella =

Silver-barred clothes moth

Species of moth

Infurcitinea argentimaculella, the silver-barred clothes moth, is a moth of the family Tineidae. It was described by Stainton in 1849. It is found in most of Europe, except Ireland, Portugal, Latvia, Lithuania and the Balkan Peninsula.

== Description ==
The wingspan is 7–8 mm. A fairly robust dark moth with contrasting markings. The antennae are filamentous and about two-thirds as long as the forewings. The head is covered with hair-like scales that are grey-yellow in the middle, darker behind and on the sides. The thorax and the forewings are black-brown, often with a slightly bronze-like sheen. The forewing has silvery-white spots that form three interrupted transverse bands, at the far end of the wing there are three small, round spots. The hind wing is dark grey. The larva is light brown with a black head.

== Biology ==
Adults are on wing from July to early August.

The larvae feed on lichens, including Lepraria species, growing on shady rocks, walls or tree trunks. They construct a lichen covered silken tube. Pupation takes place within the tube.
