= Bathroxena =

Scientific classification
- Kingdom: Animalia
- Phylum: Arthropoda
- Clade: Pancrustacea
- Class: Insecta
- Order: Lepidoptera
- Family: Tineidae
- Subfamily: Meessiinae
- Genus: Bathroxena; Meyrick 1919

Synonyms
- Pelates Dietz, 1905

Genus of moths

Bathroxena is a genus of moths belonging to the family Tineidae.

There is only one species in this genus: Bathroxena heteropalpella (Dietz, 1905) from Northern America.
