= Emblematodes =

Scientific classification
- Kingdom: Animalia
- Phylum: Arthropoda
- Clade: Pancrustacea
- Class: Insecta
- Order: Lepidoptera
- Family: Tineidae
- Genus: Emblematodes; Meyrick, 1914

Genus of moths

Emblematodes is a genus of moths belonging to the family Tineidae.

== Species ==
- Emblematodes cyanochra Meyrick, 1914 (from Malawi)
- Emblematodes aberrans Gozmany, 1965 (from Uganda)
