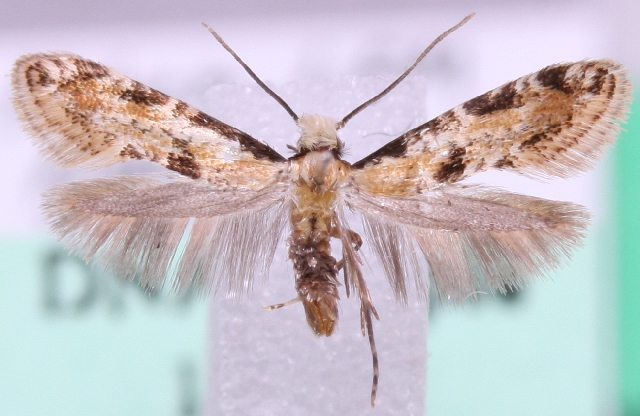

Scientific classification
- Kingdom: Animalia
- Phylum: Arthropoda
- Clade: Pancrustacea
- Class: Insecta
- Order: Lepidoptera
- Family: Tineidae
- Genus: Karsholtia; Gaedike, 1986
- Species: K. marianii

Binomial name
- Karsholtia marianii (Rebel, 1936)

Synonyms
- Tinea marianii Rebel, 1936; Infurcitinea marianii; Tinea lunatella Benander, 1939

= Karsholtia =

Species of moth

Karsholtia is a genus of moths of the family Tineidae. The genus contains the single species Karsholtia marianii. It is found in Norway, Sweden, Denmark, Germany, Austria, France and on Sicily.

The wingspan is 8–11 mm. Adults are on wing in July.

The larvae have been recorded feeding on the decaying trunks of Carpinus betulus.
