= Montetinea =

Scientific classification
- Kingdom: Animalia
- Phylum: Arthropoda
- Clade: Pancrustacea
- Class: Insecta
- Order: Lepidoptera
- Family: Tineidae
- Genus: Montetinea; Petersen, 1957

Genus of moths

Montetinea is a genus of moths belonging to the family Tineidae.

== Species ==
- Montetinea montana G. Petersen, 1957
- Montetinea tenuicornella (Klimesch, 1942)
