= Homosetia =

Scientific classification
- Kingdom: Animalia
- Phylum: Arthropoda
- Clade: Pancrustacea
- Class: Insecta
- Order: Lepidoptera
- Family: Tineidae
- Subfamily: Meessiinae
- Genus: Homosetia; Clemens, 1863

Synonyms
- Pitys Chambers, 1875; Semele Chambers, 1875; Calostinea Dietz, 1905

Genus of moths

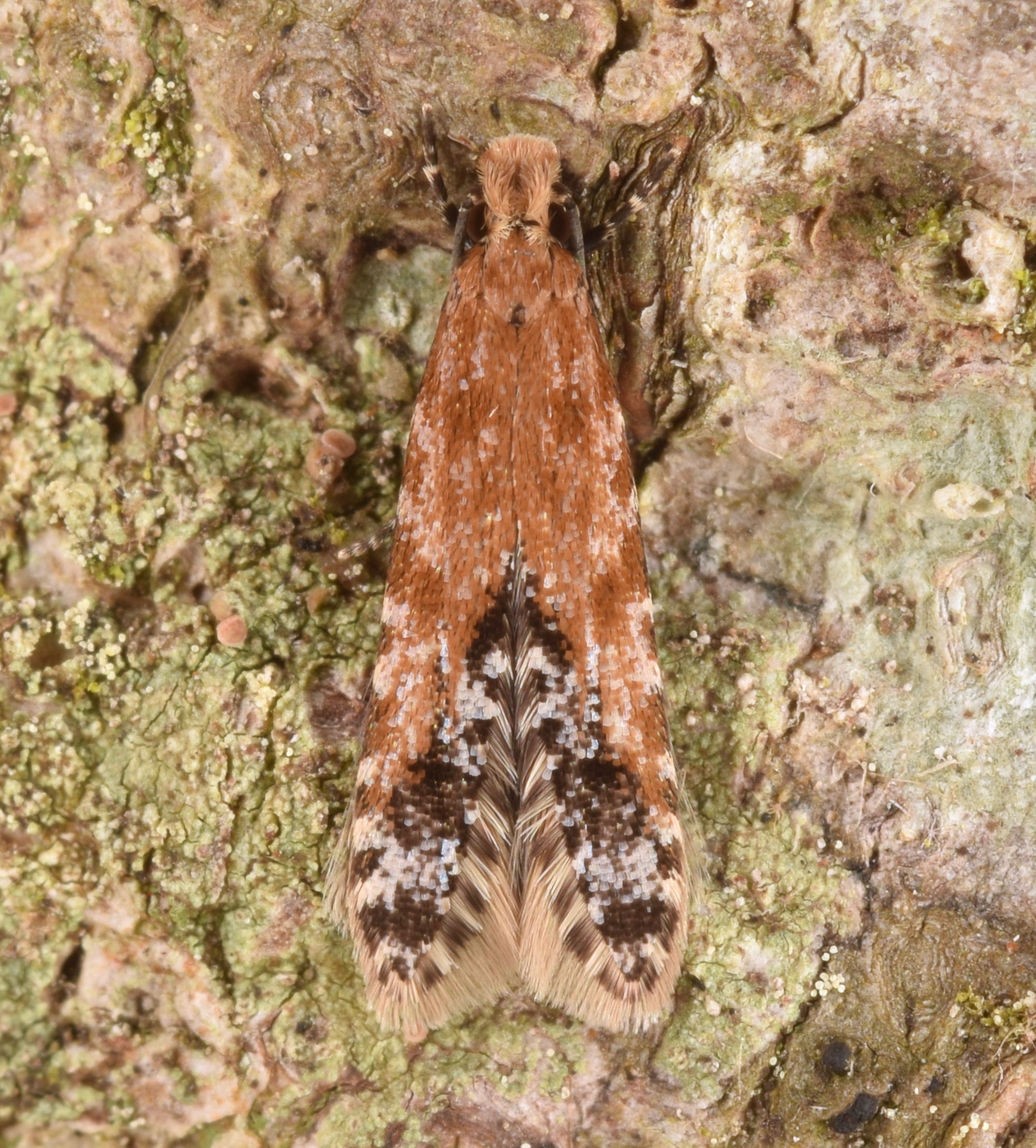
Homosetia costisignella

Homosetia is a genus of moths belonging to the family Tineidae.

== Species ==
- Homosetia argentinotella (Chambers, 1876)
- Homosetia argentistrigella (Chambers, 1873)
- Homosetia auricristatella (Chambers, 1873)
- Homosetia bifasciella (Chambers, 1876)
- Homosetia chrysoadspersella Dietz, 1905
- Homosetia costisignella (Clemens, 1863)
- Homosetia cristatella (Chambers, 1875)
- Homosetia fasciella (Chambers, 1873)
- Homosetia fuscocristatella (Chambers, 1873)
- Homosetia marginimaculella (Chambers, 1875)
- Homosetia miscecristatella (Chambers, 1873)
- Homosetia tricingulatella (Clemens, 1863)
