= Novotinea =

Scientific classification
- Kingdom: Animalia
- Phylum: Arthropoda
- Clade: Pancrustacea
- Class: Insecta
- Order: Lepidoptera
- Family: Tineidae
- Genus: Novotinea; Amsel, 1938

Genus of moths

Novotinea is a genus of moths belonging to the family Tineidae. These species are found in the palearctic region.

== Species ==
- Novotinea andalusiella Petersen, 1964
- Novotinea albarracinella Petersen, 1967
- Novotinea aritzoella Amsel, 1939
- Novotinea carbonifera (Walsingham, 1900) (Corsica, Sardinia)
- Novotinea cretica Gaedike, 2021 (Kreta)
- Novotinea fasciata (Staudinger, 1879) (Turkey)
- Novotinea klimeschi (Rebel, 1940)
- Novotinea mistrettae Parenti, 1966
- Novotinea muricolella (Fuchs, 1879) (from Spain)
- Novotinea liguriella Amsel, 1950
- Novotinea reinhardella Nel, 2014 (from Spain)
