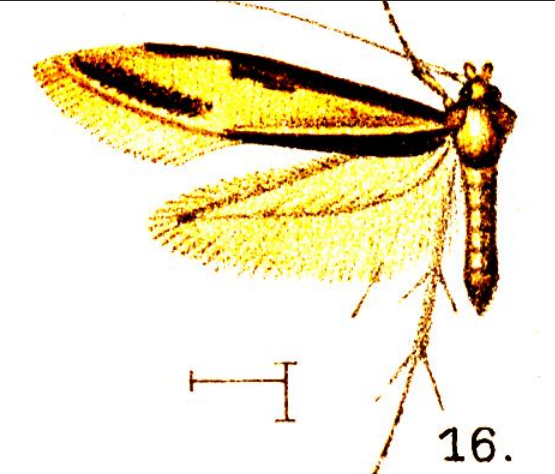

Scientific classification
- Kingdom: Animalia
- Phylum: Arthropoda
- Clade: Pancrustacea
- Class: Insecta
- Order: Lepidoptera
- Family: Tineidae
- Genus: Isocorypha

= Isocorypha =

Genus of moths

Isocorypha is a genus of moths belonging to the family Tineidae.

== Species ==
- Isocorypha limbata Walsingham, 1914
