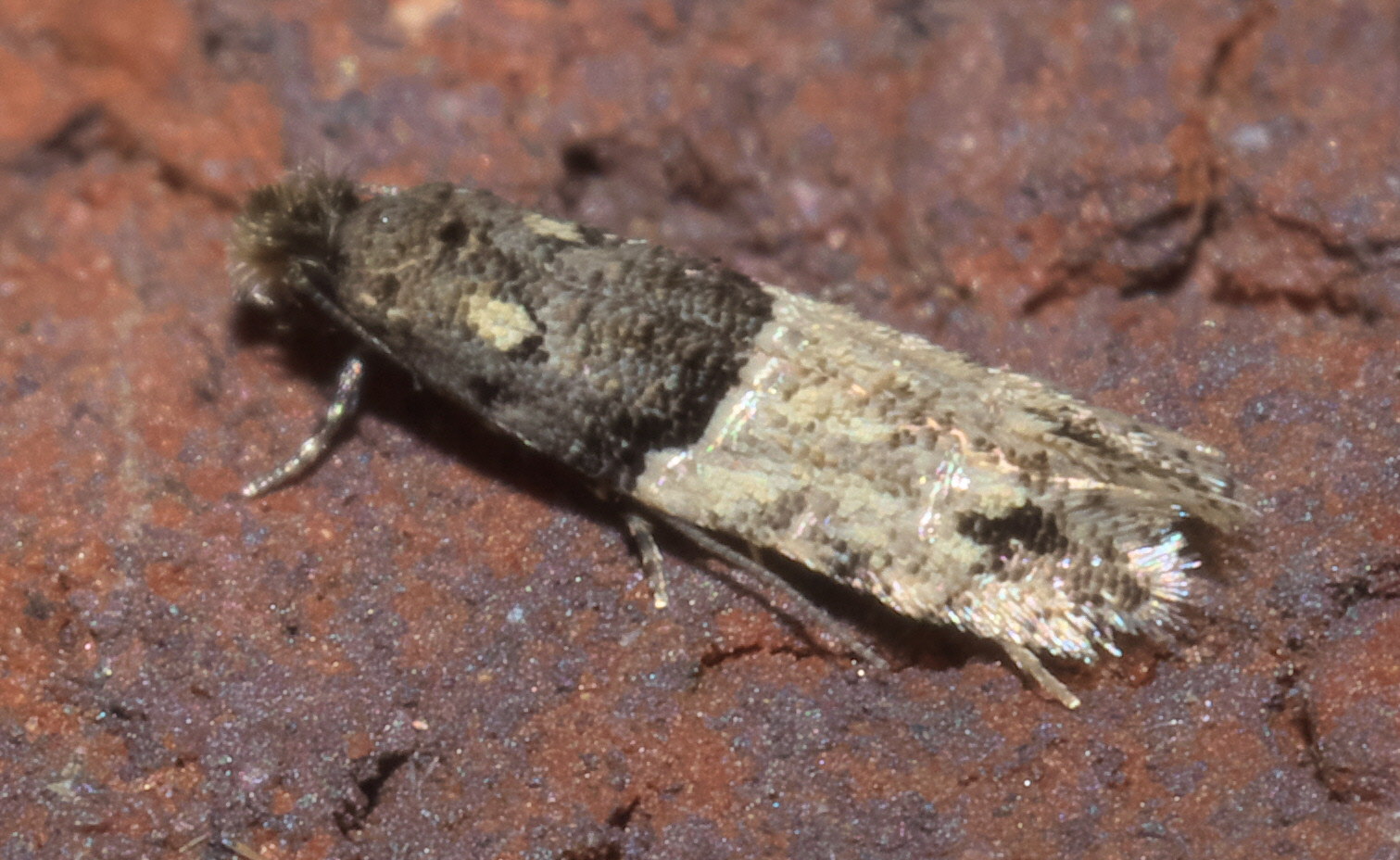
- Oenoe hybromella

Scientific classification
- Kingdom: Animalia
- Phylum: Arthropoda
- Clade: Pancrustacea
- Class: Insecta
- Order: Lepidoptera
- Family: Tineidae
- Genus: Oenoe; Chambers, 1874

Synonyms
- Baeophylla Turner, 1933

= Oenoe (moth) =

Genus of moths

Oenoe is a genus of moths belonging to the family Tineidae.

== Species ==
- Oenoe eupasta Turner, 1933 – found in Queensland, Australia
- Oenoe euphrantis Meyrick, 1927 – Bermuda
- Oenoe hemiphara Meyrick, 1893 – New South Wales, Australia
- Oenoe hybromella Chambers, 1874 – Kentucky, United States
- Oenoe minimella Forbes, 1930 – Virgin Islands
- Oenoe ocymorpha Meyrick, 1893 – New South Wales, Australia
- Oenoe pumiliella Walsingham, 1897 – West Indies
- Oenoe synchorda Meyrick, 1919 – Guyana
- Oenoe drosoptila Meyrick, 1924 – Fiji
