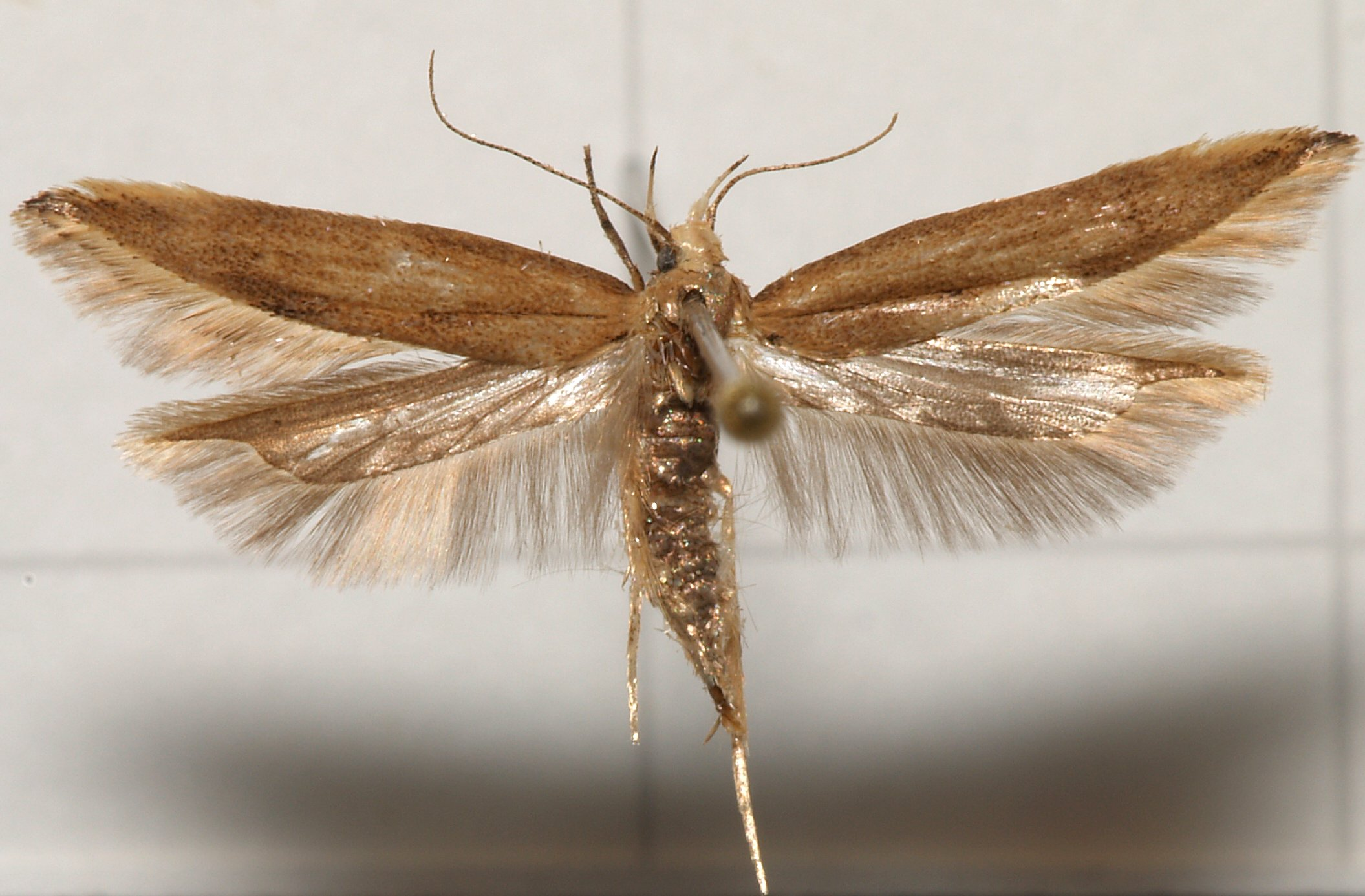
- Nemapogon granellus

Scientific classification
- Domain: Eukaryota
- Kingdom: Animalia
- Phylum: Arthropoda
- Class: Insecta
- Order: Lepidoptera
- Infraorder: Heteroneura
- Clade: Eulepidoptera
- Clade: Ditrysia
- Superfamily: Tineoidea; Latreille, 1810

Families
- Acrolophidae; Arrhenophanidae; Eriocottidae; Lypusidae; Meessiidae; Psychidae; Tineidae

Diversity
- 4,200 species

= Tineoidea =

Superfamily of moths

Tineoidea is the ditrysian superfamily of moths that includes clothes moths, bagworms and relatives. There are six families usually included within it, Eriocottidae, Arrhenophanidae, Lypusidae, Acrolophidae, Tineidae and Psychidae, whose relationships are currently uncertain.

Multiple studies showed that members of the Tineoidea are paraphyletic, that is, they are not closely related as they seem, hence their taxonomy requires revision. The Lypusidae, for example, might belong to the Gelechioidea. Some authors merge the Tineoidea and all or part of the Gracillarioidea; in this case the Tineoidea sensu stricto are downranked to a series Tineiformes.

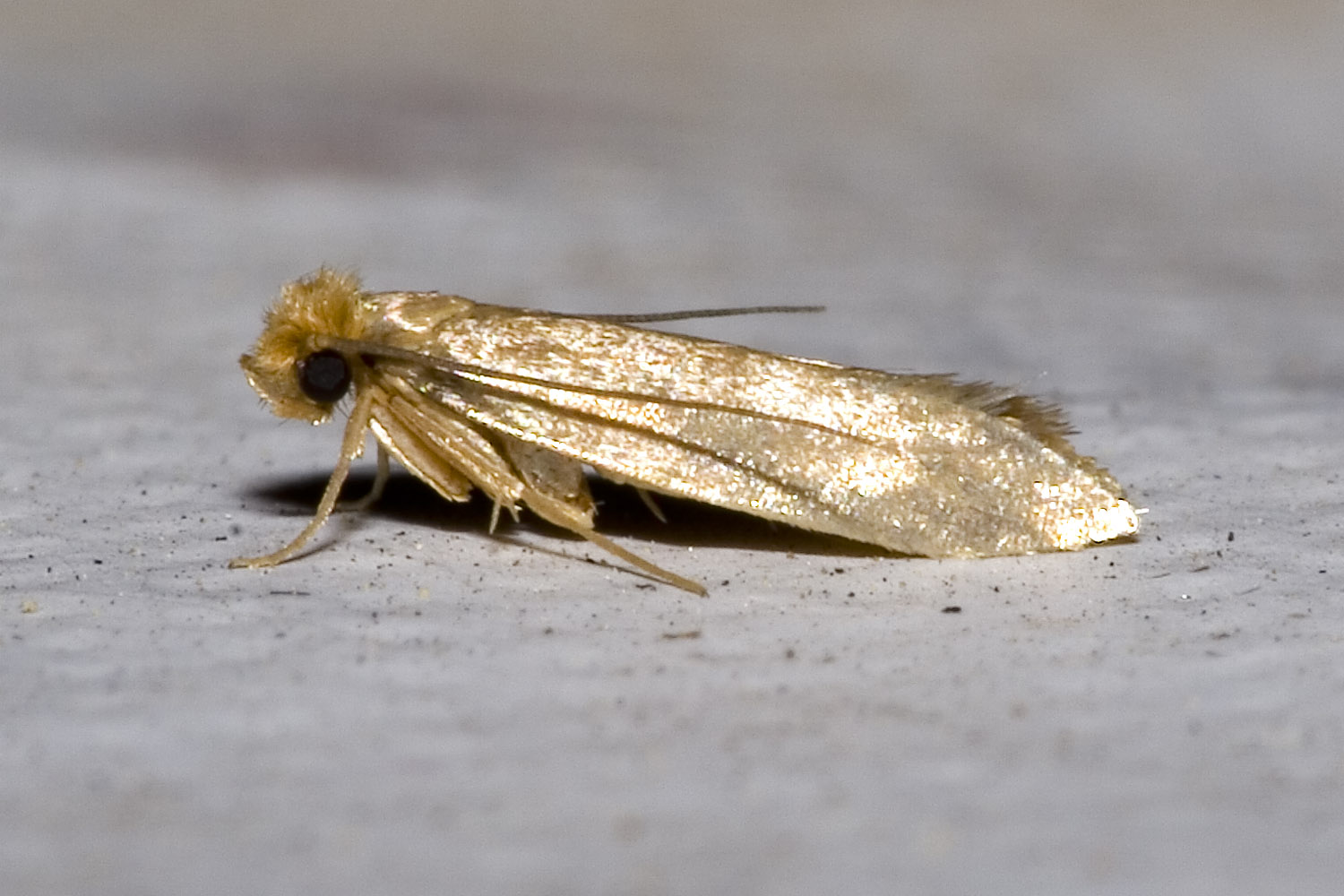
Real clothes moth (Tineola bisselliella)
