= Lichenotinea =

Scientific classification
- Kingdom: Animalia
- Phylum: Arthropoda
- Clade: Pancrustacea
- Class: Insecta
- Order: Lepidoptera
- Family: Tineidae
- Genus: Lichenotinea

Genus of moths

Lichenotinea is a genus of moths belonging to the family Tineidae.

The Lichenotinea pustulatella was described by Philipp Christoph Zeller in 1852.
