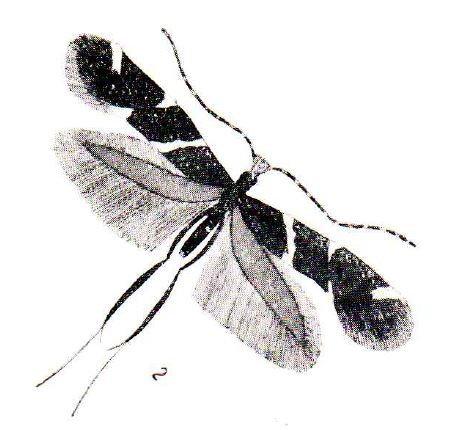
- Eudarcia nigraella

Scientific classification
- Kingdom: Animalia
- Phylum: Arthropoda
- Clade: Pancrustacea
- Class: Insecta
- Order: Lepidoptera
- Family: Tineidae
- Subfamily: Meessiinae
- Genus: Eudarcia; Clemens, 1860

Type species
- Eudarcia simulatricella Clemens, 1860

= Eudarcia =

Genus of moths

Eudarcia is a genus of moths belonging to the family Tineidae.

== Species ==
These 82 species belong to the genus Eudarcia:

- Eudarcia alanyacola Gaedike, 2011
- Eudarcia abchasicum Zagulajev, 1979
- Eudarcia alberti (Amsel, 1957)
- Eudarcia alludens (Meyrick, 1919)
- Eudarcia alvearis (Meyrick, 1919)
- Eudarcia anaglypta (Meyrick, 1893) (from Australia)
- Eudarcia argyrophaea (Forbes, 1931)
- Eudarcia armatum (Gaedike, 1985)
- Eudarcia atlantica Henderickx, 1995
- Eudarcia aureliani (Capuse, 1967)
- Eudarcia balcaicum (Gaedike, 1988)
- Eudarcia balcanicum (Gaedike, 1988)
- Eudarcia bicolorella (Forbes, 1931)
- Eudarcia brachyptera (Passerin d'Entreves, 1974)
- Eudarcia caucasica (Zagulajev, 1978)
- Eudarcia celidopa (Fletcher, 1933)
- Eudarcia cocosensis (Davis, 1994)
- Eudarcia confusella (Heydenreich, 1851)
- Eudarcia croaticum (Petersen, 1962)
- Eudarcia cuniculata (Meyrick, 1919)
- Eudarcia daghestanica (Zagulajev, 1993)
- Eudarcia dalmaticum (Gaedike, 1988)
- Eudarcia deferens (Meyrick, 1927)
- Eudarcia defluescens (Meyrick, 1934)
- Eudarcia dentata Gaedike, 2000
- Eudarcia derrai (Gaedike, 1983)
- Eudarcia diarthra (Meyrick, 1919)
- Eudarcia echinatum (Petersen & Gaedike, 1985)
- Eudarcia egregiellum (Petersen, 1973)
- Eudarcia eunitariaeella (Chambers, 1873) (from North America)
- Eudarcia fasciata (Staudinger, 1880)
- Eudarcia fibigeri Gaedike, 1997
- Eudarcia forsteri (Petersen, 1964)
- Eudarcia gallica (Petersen, 1962)
- Eudarcia glaseri (Petersen, 1967) (from Europe)
- Eudarcia gracilis (Petersen, 1968)
- Eudarcia graecum (Gaedike, 1985)
- Eudarcia granulatella (Zeller, 1852)
- Eudarcia haliplancta (Meyrick, 1927)
- Eudarcia hedemanni (Rebel, 1899)
- Eudarcia hellenica Gaedike, 2007
- Eudarcia herculanella (Capuse, 1966)
- Eudarcia holtzi (Rebel, 1902)
- Eudarcia ignara (Meyrick, 1922)
- Eudarcia ignorata Bidzily 2016 (from Greece)
- Eudarcia incincta (Meyrick, 1919)
- Eudarcia isoploca (Meyrick, 1919)
- Eudarcia jaworskii Gaedike, 2011
- Eudarcia kasyi (Petersen, 1971)
- Eudarcia lamprodeta (Meyrick, 1919)
- Eudarcia lapidicolella (Herrich-Schäffer, 1854)
- Eudarcia lattakianum (Petersen, 1968)
- Eudarcia leopoldella (O.G.Costa, 1836)
- Eudarcia lobata (Petersen & Gaedike, 1979)
- Eudarcia mensella (Walsingham, 1900)
- Eudarcia microptera Dominguez
- Eudarcia montanum (Gaedike, 1985)
- Eudarcia moreae (Petersen & Gaedike, 1983)
- Eudarcia nerviella (Amsel, 1954) (from Europe)
- Eudarcia nigraella (Mariani, 1937)
- Eudarcia oceanica Bippus, 2020
- Eudarcia orbiculidomus (Sakai & Saigusa, 1999)
- Eudarcia ornata Gaedike, 2000
- Eudarcia pagenstecherella (Hubner, 1825)
- Eudarcia palanfreella Baldizzone & Gaedike, 2004
- Eudarcia petrologa (Meyrick, 1919)
- Eudarcia plumella (Walsingham, 1892)
- Eudarcia protograpta (Meyrick, 1935)
- Eudarcia richardsoni (Walsingham, 1900) (from Europe)
- Eudarcia romanum (Petersen, 1968)
- Eudarcia sacculata (Gozmány, 1968) (from Ghana & Sierra Leone)
- Eudarcia sardoa (Passerin d'Entreves, 1978)
- Eudarcia saucropis (Meyrick, 1911) (from Seychelles)
- Eudarcia saxatilis Bidzily 2016 (from Crimea)
- Eudarcia servilis (Meyrick, 1914)
- Eudarcia simulatricella Clemens, 1860 (from Europe)
- Eudarcia sinjovi Gaedike, 2000
- Eudarcia subtile (Petersen, 1973)
- Eudarcia sutteri Gaedike, 1997
- Eudarcia tetraonella (Walsingham, 1897)
- Eudarcia tischeriella (Walsingham, 1897)
- Eudarcia topoliacola Gaedike, 2021 (from Greece; Crete)
- Eudarcia turcica Gaedike, 1997
- Eudarcia vacriensis (Parenti, 1964)
- Eudarcia verkerki Gaedike & Henderickx, 1999
