= Arrhenophaninae =

Scientific classification
- Kingdom: Animalia
- Phylum: Arthropoda
- Class: Insecta
- Order: Lepidoptera
- Family: Psychidae
- Subfamily: Arrhenophaninae; Walsingham, 1913

Genera
- See text.

Family of moths

Arrhenophaninae is a subfamily of moths in family Psychidae. It was once recognised as a family, but has been found deeply nested in Psychidae in phylogenetic studies.

== Genera ==
- Arrhenophanes
- Cnissostages
- Dysoptus
- Notiophanes
- Palaeophanes

The genus Parameristis with the species Parameristis eremaea is now considered to be a Psychidae species in the genus Lamyristis.
