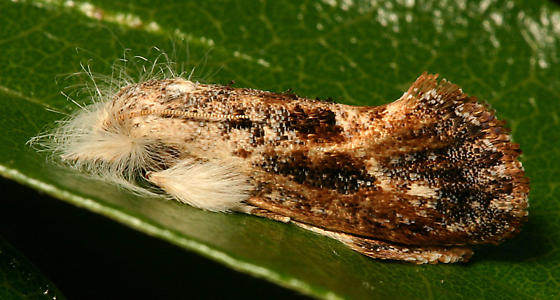
- Acrolophus species

Scientific classification
- Kingdom: Animalia
- Phylum: Arthropoda
- Clade: Pancrustacea
- Class: Insecta
- Order: Lepidoptera
- Family: Tineidae
- Subfamily: Acrolophinae; Busck, 1912

Genera
- See text

= Acrolophinae =

Moth family containing the burrowing webworm moths

Acrolophinae is a subfamily of moths in the order Lepidoptera. The subfamily comprises the burrowing webworm moths and tube moths and holds about 300 species in five genera, which occur in the wild only in the New World. It is within the family Tineidae.

== Genera ==
- Acrolophus
- Amydria
- Drastea
- Exoncotis
- Ptilopsaltis
