= Tramp species =

Organism globally spread by humans

In ecology, a tramp species is an organism that has been spread globally by human activities. The term was coined by William Morton Wheeler in the bulletin of the American Museum of Natural History in 1906, used to describe ants that “have made their way as well known tramps or stow-aways [sic] to many islands". The term has since widened to include non-ant organisms, but remains most popular in myrmecology. Tramp species have been noted in multiple phyla spanning both animal and plant kingdoms, including but not limited to arthropods, mollusca, bryophytes, and pteridophytes. The term "tramp species" was popularized and given a more set definition by Luc Passera in his chapter of David F. William's 1994 book Exotic Ants: Biology, Impact, And Control Of Introduced Species.

== Definition ==
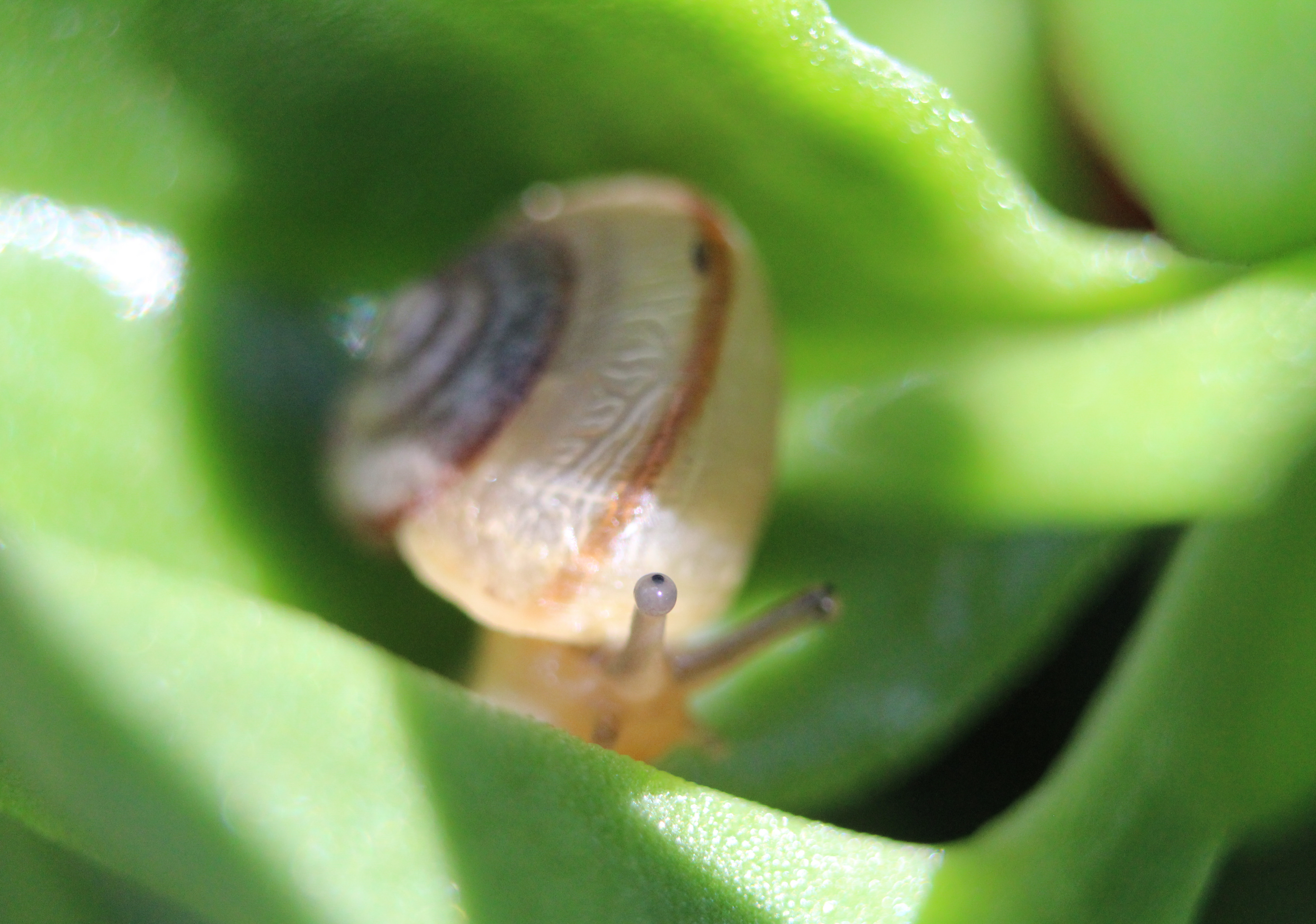
Asian trampsnail (Bradybaena similaris), an invasive gastropod found in several countries worldwide.

Tramp species are organisms that have stable populations outside their native ranges. They are closely associated with human activities. They are disturbance-specialists, and are characterized by their synanthropic associations with humans as their primary mode of expansion is human-mediated dispersal. That being said, tramp species are not limited to anthropogenically disturbed habitats, they have the potential to invade pristine habitats, especially when established in a new area. For example, Anoplolepis gracilipes was able to invade undisturbed forest ecosystems in Australia after being introduced and having an established population in northeast Arnhem Land. While some tramp species are invasive, the majority of them are not. Some can exist alongside native species without competing with them, simply occupying unfilled niches, such as is the case with some populations of Tapinoma melanocephalum and Monomorium pharaonic, who rarely interfere with native species outside human settlement areas.

=== Ants ===
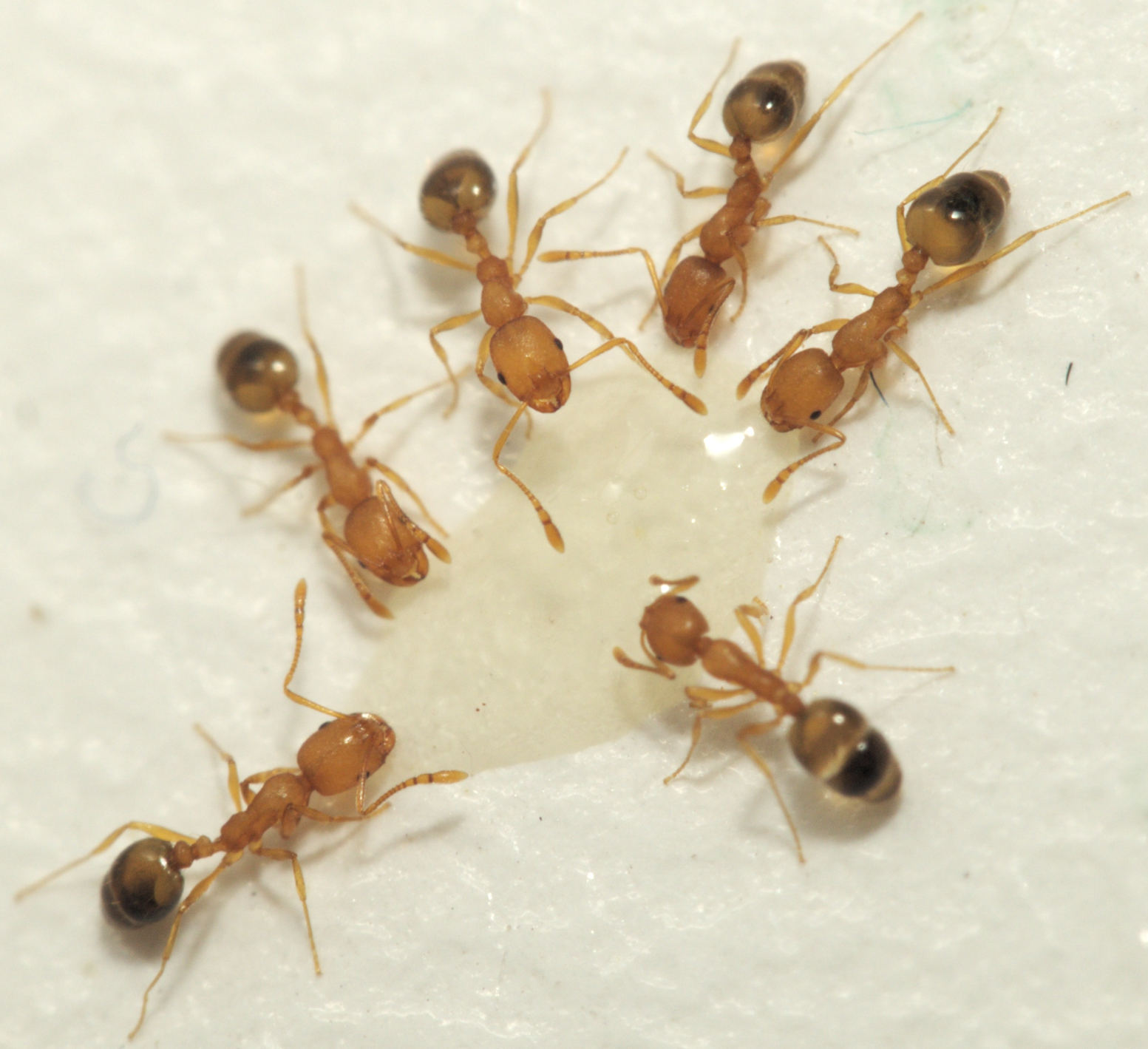
Pharaoh ant (Monomorium pharaonis) a well established tramp species able to thrive in diverse environments.

Ants have a more rigid list of criterion to be considered "true" tramp species. The most cited body of work outlining these traits comes from Luc Passera. His primary and most important criterion is that the distribution of the species must be linked to human activities, what he refers to as "anthropophilic tendency". He also lists the following traits as being likely common to all tramp species: small size, monomorphism of worker ants (worker ants having only one phenotype), high rates of polygyny, unicoloniality, strong interspecific aggressiveness, worker ant sterility, and colony reproduction by budding. These traits may appear with more or less intensity among considered tramp species, and in fact, literature does not currently require a tramp species to possess every single one of these attributes. Ant tramp species in particular can be ecological indicators on the susceptibility of an ecosystem to become invaded or ecological instability.

== Causes and distribution ==
All tramp species are distributed globally by as a result of human transportation. As such, they are almost always present in urban or human-settled environments, and have colonizing mechanisms that are well adapted to human cohabitation, referred to as possessing "anthropogenically reinforced dispersal biology". The globalization of trade and travel have contributed significantly to the dispersal of tramp species worldwide. Trade activities involving the importation and exportation of cargos on ships (often containing plants, soil, wood and other biological mediums) are noted as being an especially important methods of introduction. These often repeated introductions (as oftentimes shipments will come from the same place) contribute to fortifying the genetic variability and initial population sizes of newly transplanted tramp species, which facilitates their establishment in novel environments. After their human-mediated introductions, tramp species can also benefit from human disturbance to the environment. Anthropogenic forces (such as construction and agriculture) can dramatically impact local fauna and flora, weakening the environment and making the area more susceptible to the encroachment of tramp species. This phenomenon is noted as a particularly tough issue in Tropical Asia, where monocropping practices of local rubber plant farms have decimated indigenous species assemblages and habitat structures, allowing the establishment of many problematic tramp species. Another example is the Thousand Islands Archipelago in Indonesia, where the small tropical islands are especially vulnerable to human disturbance, which facilitated the establishment of multiple tramp species.

The range expansion of tramp ants is projected to increase with weather pattern changes due to climate change. As many tramp species are well adapted to disturbances in their native habitat, they are particularly resilient to large-scale, unpredictable weather events (such as floods, wildfires and monsoons), which are set to increase in frequency as anthropogenic activity continues to affect global systems.

== Effects on local environments ==
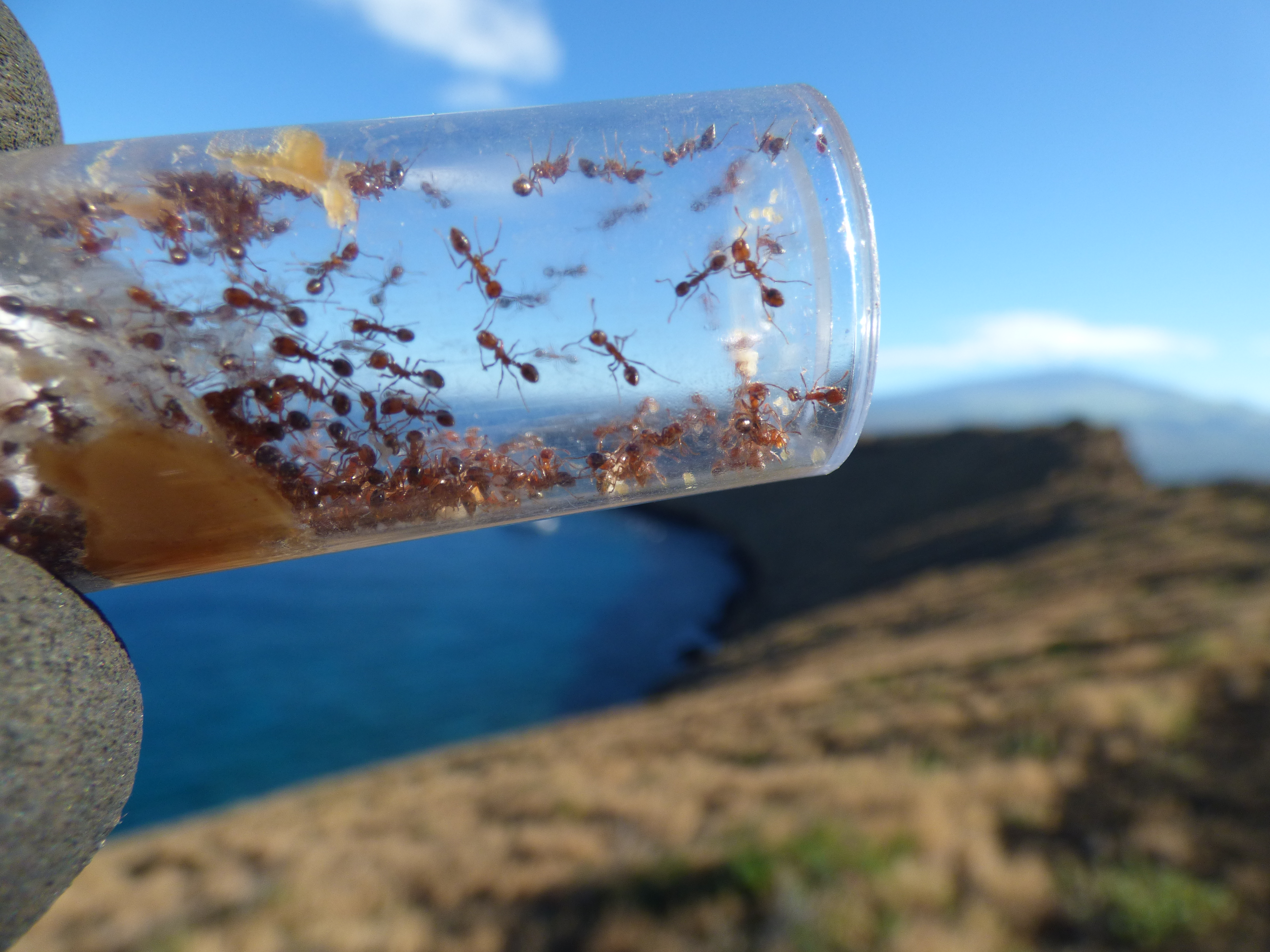
A vial filled with fire ants (Solenopsis geminata), a species identified as a human health hazard.

Tramp species can have similar effects to invasive species, and in some literature the term "tramp" species is used as a synonym for invasive. As such they can outcompete and displace local fauna, decreasing species richness. They can also have direct impacts on human health, such as is the case with Solenopsis geminata and Brachyponera senaarensis. Both of these venomous species have been known to bite humans, often times causing severe anaphylactic reactions; this has made them known public health hazards in the regions they are found. Tramp species can also be nuisance pests, damaging housing structures and crops. However, tramp species are not always invasive, and can cohabitate without harming local environments or species assemblages.

== Control and eradication ==
As tramp species are so diverse in their ecology, there is no universal protocol to prevent their encroachment into new territories. However, there are certain strategies that can be employed to mitigate tramp species. In some environments, maintaining diversity of local species assemblages can deter certain tramp species. Currently, there is a deficiency in our ability to identify potential new tramp species quickly - a phenomenon dubbed "taxonomic impediment", which is a delay in identifying invasive species threats. As such, it is essential to increasing identification tools for preventative action against tramp species. Interdepartmental cooperation for pest management can be very effective in tramp species management, as a collaborative effort between affected stakeholders can increase the likelihood of success in mitigation. Direct pest management efforts have included baits with insect growth regulators to sterilize colonies to varying degrees of success. One method that can be successful for urban infestation of tramp ants specifically (depending on their specific biology) in temperate zones is to shut off heat sources for two weeks or more, as many can be heat-adapted species.

== List of tramp species ==
=== Arthropods ===
==== Ants ====
Anoplolepis gracilipes

Brachyponera sennaarensis

Cardiocondyla emeryi

Cardiocondyla kagutsuchi

Cardiocondyla nuda

Cardiocondyla obscurior

Cardiocondyla wroughtonii

Hypoponera punctatissima

Iridomyrmex anceps

Lasius neglectus

Linepithema humile

Monomorium destructor

Monomorium floricola

Monomorium indicum

Monomorium monomorium

Monomorium pharaonic

Nylanderia spp.*

Paratrechina flavipes

Paratrechina jaegerskioeldi

Paratrechina longicornis

Pheidole fervens

Pheidole megacephala

Pheidole teneriffana

Solenopsis geminata

Solenopsis invicta

Tetramorium caespitum

Tetramorium bicarinatum

Tetramorium lanuginosum

Tetramorium pacificum

Tetramorium simillimum

Tapinoma melanocephalum

Tapinoma simrothi

Technomyrmex albipes

Technomyrmex brunneus

Trichomyrmex destructor

Wasmannia auropunctata

==== Millipedes ====
Chondromorpha xanthotricha

Glyphiulus granulatus

Orthomorpha coarcata

Oxidus gracilis

Pseudospirobolellus avernus

Trigoniulus corallinus

==== Silverfish ====
Ctenolepisma longicaudata

==== Termites ====
Cryptotermes sp.

==== Wasps ====
Calliscelio elegans

Platygastroidea superfamily

=== Mollusca ===
==== Land snails ====
Bradybaena similaris

==== Slugs ====
Deroceras panormitanum

Deroceras invadens

=== Plants ===
==== Bryophytes ====
Diplasiolejeunea ingekarolae

Daltonia marginata

Daltonia splachnoides

==== Pteridophytes ====
Nephrolepis biserrata

Williams and Lucky 2020 provide a thorough listing of all known Nylanderia species with established populations outside their native ranges.

== See also ==
- Lists of invasive species
- Supertramp (ecology)
- Climate change and invasive species
- Attribution of recent climate change
