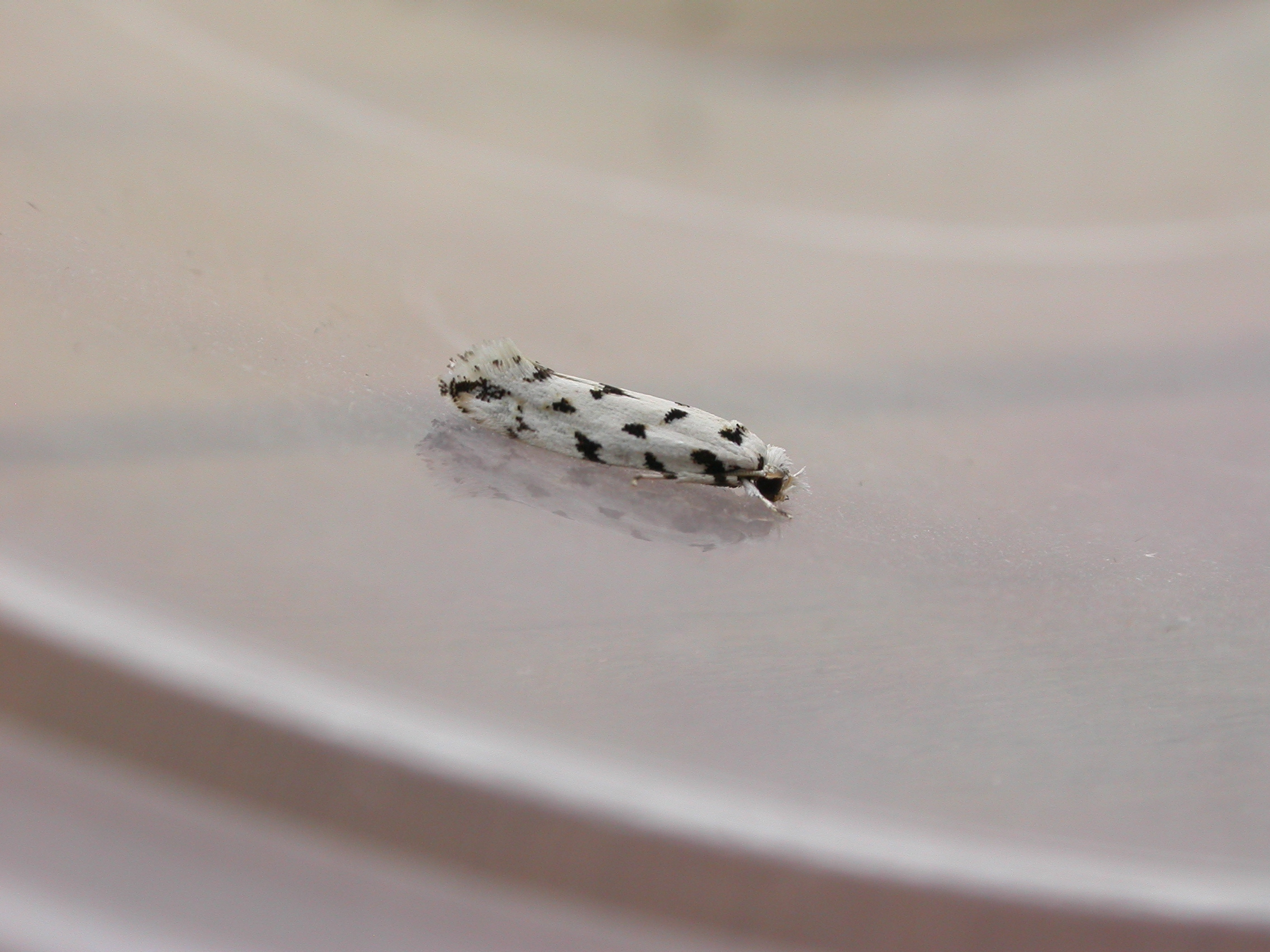

Scientific classification
- Kingdom: Animalia
- Phylum: Arthropoda
- Clade: Pancrustacea
- Class: Insecta
- Order: Lepidoptera
- Family: Tineidae
- Genus: Erechthias
- Species: E. simulans

Binomial name
- Erechthias simulans (Butler, 1882)

Synonyms
- Several, see text

= Erechthias simulans =

Species of moth

Erechthias simulans is a species of fungus moth (family Tineidae). It is here considered to belong to the somewhat controversial type genus of its subfamily Erechthiinae, though even fairly recently some authors have proposed to retain other genera such as Decadarchis separate from Erechthias. Decadarchis, with E. simulans as type species (under the obsolete name Decadarchis melanastra), would in fact contain this moth and its closest relatives, regardless whether it is recognized as full genus or as subgenus. These relatives are generally held to be a group of mainly Polynesian species. E. simulans has also been mistaken for a species of the closely related genus Comodica; while the delimitation of this versus Erechthias/Decadarchis is not universally agreed upon, E. simulans is not included in Comodica anymore by modern authors.

This moth is widespread across Polynesia and ranges into some adjacent regions. It is known from Fiji, Samoa, the Ellice Islands, the Hawaiian Islands (including Midway Island), the Marquesas (at least Hiva Oa, Nuku Hiva, Tahuata), the Society Islands and Solomon Islands, Australia (at least Queensland), and eastern Africa. On higher islands, it may preferably occur near the coast. Its original distribution is probably undeterminable; it shows some traits of a supertramp species, but has likely been assisted to spread across its present range by human transport of its food plants.

== Description and ecology ==
The wingspan is 15–20 mm (about 2/3 inch).

In the male genitals, the clasper's harpe is broad and stubby, with a large swelling covered in bristles arising from the center of the costa; the outer edge of the cucullus is toothed. The uncus is slightly sclerotized (hardened) along the sides, and divided at the tip. The vinculum is very broad and in its rear part distinctly flattened; the tegumen forms a narrow ring. The front part of the anellus is cup shaped, and the aedeagus is long and slim, with an equally elongated and slender cornutus. In the female genitals, the ostium is narrow and U-shaped. The antrum is tubular and sclerotized, with the ductus seminalis attaching at its upperside base. The ductus bursae is sclerotized in the forward part, with the hind part being a delicate membrane, and forms a broad loop at its junction with the bursa copulatrix. The latter organ bears a mesh structure formed by fine ridges; the signum is sickle shaped and the capitulum well developed.

The caterpillar larvae feed on dead and decaying plant stems (particularly the bark and outer wood). They are polyphagous and likely very indiscriminate in their eating habits. Possible food plants seem to include most core eudicots, as the larvae have been recorded from across that clade: Known food plants are sea hibiscus (Hibiscus tiliaceus), lonomea (Sapindus oahuensis), saman (Albizia saman) and coffee trees (Coffea); the last two are not native to the Pacific region, testifying to the species' adaptability.

Pupation takes place in a tough cocoon in a tunnel in which the caterpillar has lived. The pupa is about 10 mm long.

== Synonyms ==
Junior synonyms by which E. simulans was formerly known are:

- Comodica decaspila Lower, 1905
- Decadarchis melanastra Meyrick, 1886
- Decadarchis simulans (Butler, 1882) (but see above)
- Ereunetis simulans (Butler, 1882)
- Tinea simulans Butler, 1882
