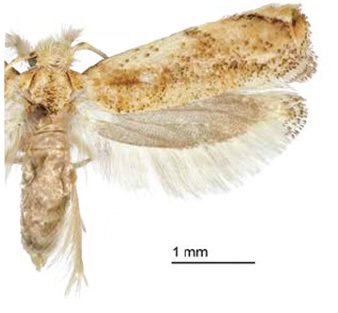
- Erechthias minuscula

Scientific classification
- Kingdom: Animalia
- Phylum: Arthropoda
- Clade: Pancrustacea
- Class: Insecta
- Order: Lepidoptera
- Family: Tineidae
- Subfamily: Erechthiinae; Meyrick, 1880

Type genus
- Erechthias Meyrick, 1880

= Erechthiinae =

Subfamily of moths

The Erechthiinae are a subfamily of moth of the family Tineidae.

== Genera ==
- Anastathma
- Callicerastis (sometimes in Erechthias)
- Comodica
- Erechthias Meyrick, 1880
- Mecomodica (sometimes in Comodica or Erechthias)
- Petula
- Phthinocola
- Pisistrata
- Pontodryas
- Thuriostoma
