= White-footed ant =

White-footed ant can refer to:

- Technomyrmex albipes
- Technomyrmex difficilis
- Technomyrmex jocosus
- Technomyrmex vitiensis
