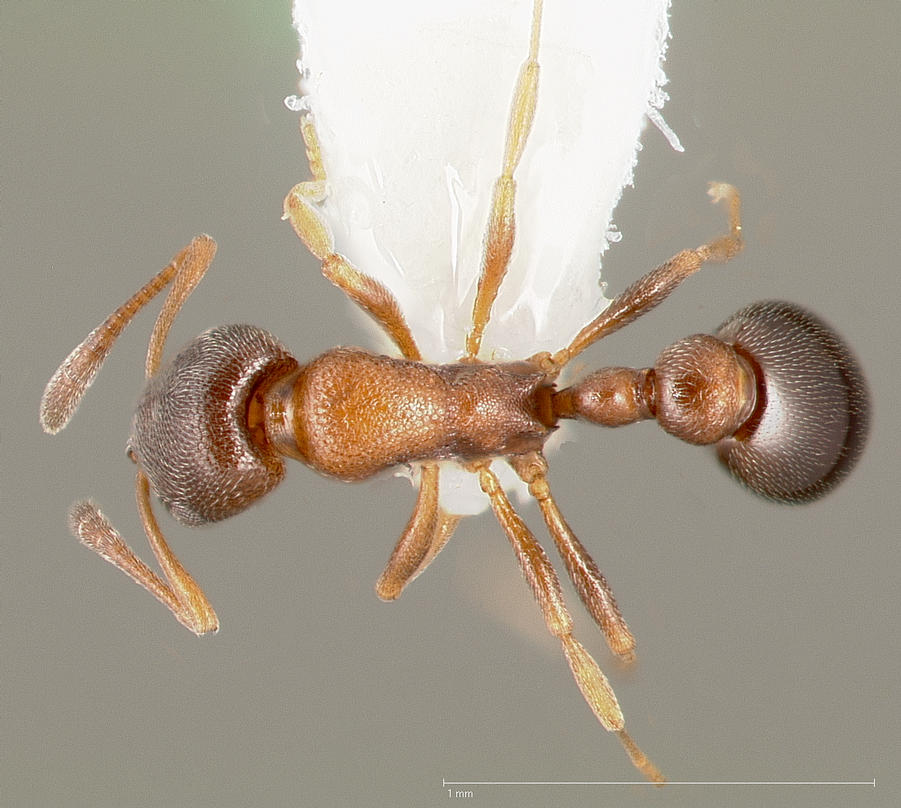

Scientific classification
- Domain: Eukaryota
- Kingdom: Animalia
- Phylum: Arthropoda
- Class: Insecta
- Order: Hymenoptera
- Family: Formicidae
- Subfamily: Myrmicinae
- Genus: Cardiocondyla
- Species: C. mauritanica

Binomial name
- Cardiocondyla mauritanica Forel, 1890

= Cardiocondyla mauritanica =

Species of ant

Cardiocondyla mauritanica is a species of Myrmicine ant. It is native to North Africa and the Middle East, but has since become a widespread tramp species and are now found virtually worldwide.

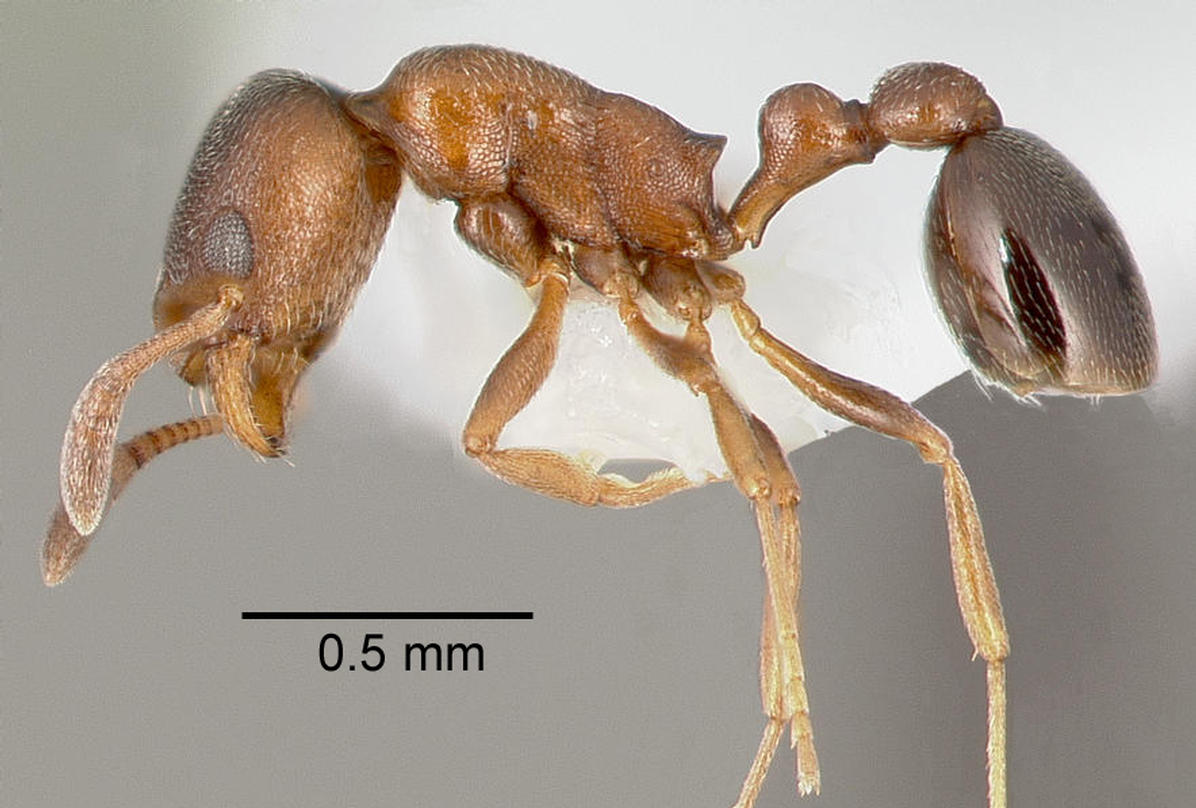
