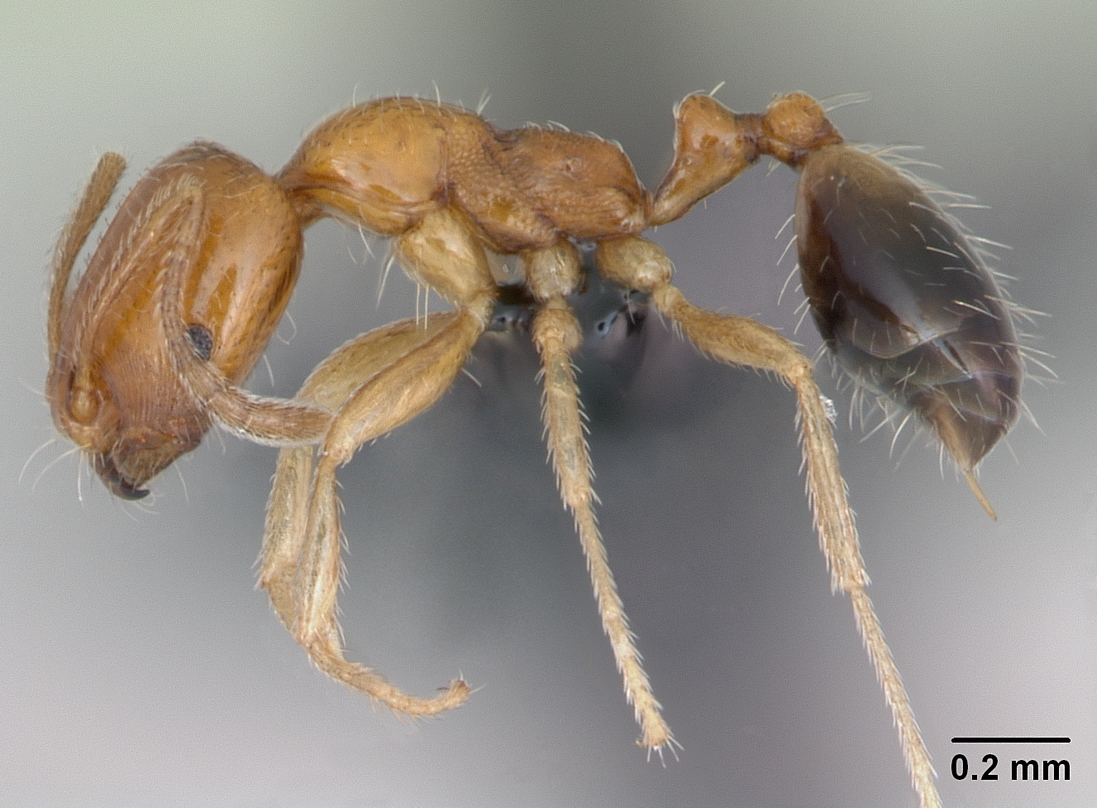
- Trichomyrmex destructor worker

Scientific classification
- Kingdom: Animalia
- Phylum: Arthropoda
- Class: Insecta
- Order: Hymenoptera
- Family: Formicidae
- Subfamily: Myrmicinae
- Tribe: Crematogastrini
- Genus: Trichomyrmex; Mayr, 1865

Type species
- Trichomyrmex rogeri

Diversity
- 20 species

Synonyms
- Equestrimessor Santschi, 1919; Holcomyrmex Mayr, 1879; Parholcomyrmex Emery, 1915

= Trichomyrmex =

Genus of ants

Trichomyrmex is a genus of ants in the subfamily Myrmicinae. Described by Mayr in 1865, it was revalidated as a genus by Ward et al. 2015 after numerous previous revisions. These ants are native to southeastern Europe, Africa, and Asia, although some species like T. destructor are invasive elsewhere.

== Species ==
- Trichomyrmex aberrans Forel, 1902
- Trichomyrmex abyssinicus (Forel, 1894)
- Trichomyrmex almosayari Sharaf & Aldawood, 2016
- Trichomyrmex chobauti (Emery, 1896)
- Trichomyrmex criniceps (Mayr, 1879)
- Trichomyrmex destructor (Jerdon, 1851)
- Trichomyrmex emeryi Mayr, 1895
- Trichomyrmex epinotale Santschi, 1923
- Trichomyrmex glaber (André, 1883)
- Trichomyrmex lameerei (Forel, 1902)
- Trichomyrmex mayri (Forel, 1902)
- Trichomyrmex muticus (Emery, 1887)
- Trichomyrmex oscaris Forel, 1894
- Trichomyrmex perplexus (Radchenko, 1997)
- Trichomyrmex robustior (Forel, 1892)
- Trichomyrmex rogeri Mayr, 1865
- Trichomyrmex santschii (Forel, 1907)
- Trichomyrmex scabriceps (Mayr, 1879)
- Trichomyrmex shakeri Sharaf & Al Dhafer, 2016
- Trichomyrmex wroughtoni Forel, 1911
