= Trichomyrmex emeryi =

Scientific classification
- Kingdom: Animalia
- Phylum: Arthropoda
- Clade: Pancrustacea
- Class: Insecta
- Order: Hymenoptera
- Family: Formicidae
- Subfamily: Myrmicinae
- Genus: Trichomyrmex
- Species: T. emeryi

Binomial name
- Trichomyrmex emeryi (Mayr, 1895)

Species of ant

Trichomyrmex emeryi is a species of ant in the subfamily Myrmicinae.

== Subspecies ==
- Monomorium emeryi emeryi Mayr, 1895 - Botswana, Malawi, Mozambique, Zimbabwe
- Monomorium emeryi laevior Mayr, 1897 - Sri Lanka
