= Trichomyrmex scabriceps =

Scientific classification
- Kingdom: Animalia
- Phylum: Arthropoda
- Clade: Pancrustacea
- Class: Insecta
- Order: Hymenoptera
- Family: Formicidae
- Subfamily: Myrmicinae
- Genus: Trichomyrmex
- Species: T. scabriceps

Binomial name
- Trichomyrmex scabriceps (Mayr, 1879)

Synonyms
- Holcomyrmex scabriceps Mayr, 1879; Monomorium scabriceps (Mayr, 1879)

Species of ant

Trichomyrmex scabriceps is a species of ant in the subfamily Myrmicinae. It is found from India and Pakistan.
