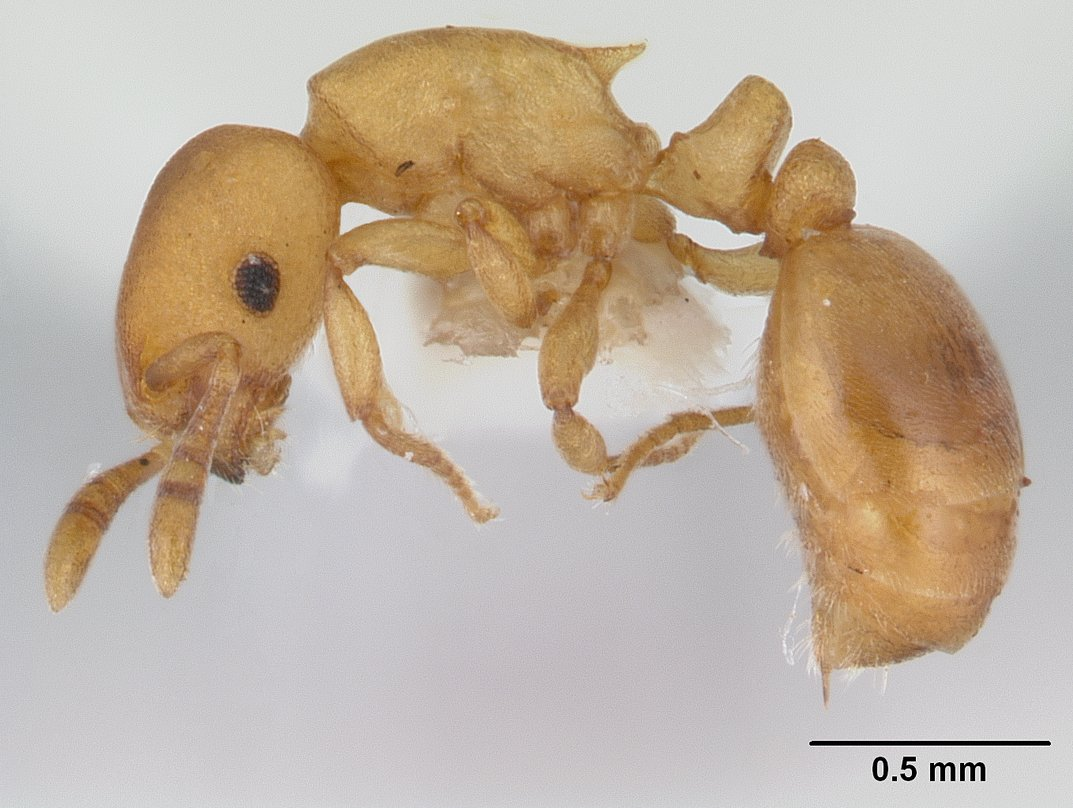
- Stereomyrmex horni worker

Scientific classification
- Kingdom: Animalia
- Phylum: Arthropoda
- Clade: Pancrustacea
- Class: Insecta
- Order: Hymenoptera
- Family: Formicidae
- Subfamily: Myrmicinae
- Tribe: Crematogastrini
- Alliance: Podomyrma genus group
- Genus: Stereomyrmex; Emery, 1901

Type species
- Stereomyrmex horni Emery, 1901

Diversity
- 3 species

Synonyms
- Willowsiella Wheeler, 1934

= Stereomyrmex =

Genus of ants

S. dispar worker

Stereomyrmex is a genus of myrmicine ants. Two of the described species are known from only a single worker, making this one of the rarest groups of ants in the world.

== Biology ==
The single specimen of S. anderseni was caught in a pitfall trap, and nothing is known about its biology.

== Systematics ==
Stereomyrmex is probably the sister taxon to Romblonella. Closely related genera are Leptothorax and Cardiocondyla.

== Description ==
Stereomyrmex dispar is 3.2 mm long and black, with yellowish brown mandibles, antennae, legs and terminal segments of gaster. S. anderseni is only 2 mm long, has a very different petiolar and postpetiolar structure and is paler in color.

== Distribution ==
Stereomyrmex dispar has been described from a single worker, taken in 1933 on Bellona Island, Solomon Islands; no other specimen has since been found, and it is unlikely that the species is truly endemic to Bellona. S. anderseni is known from a single worker as well. S. horni was collected under rocks in Sri Lanka.

== Names ==
The genus was originally named in honor of Maurice Willows Jr., who collected the type specimen of S. dispar. S. anderseni was collected by A.N. Andersen. S. horni was collected by W. Horn.

== Species ==
- Stereomyrmex anderseni (Taylor, 1991) — King Edward River, Western Australia
- Stereomyrmex dispar (Wheeler, 1934) — Bellona, Solomon Islands
- Stereomyrmex horni Emery, 1901 — Sri Lanka
