= Cardiocondyla zoserka =

Conservation status
- Vulnerable (IUCN 2.3)

Scientific classification
- Kingdom: Animalia
- Phylum: Arthropoda
- Class: Insecta
- Order: Hymenoptera
- Family: Formicidae
- Subfamily: Myrmicinae
- Genus: Cardiocondyla
- Species: C. zoserka

Binomial name
- Cardiocondyla zoserka Bolton, 1982

Species of ant

Cardiocondyla zoserka is a species of ant in the genus Cardiocondyla. It is native to Nigeria.
