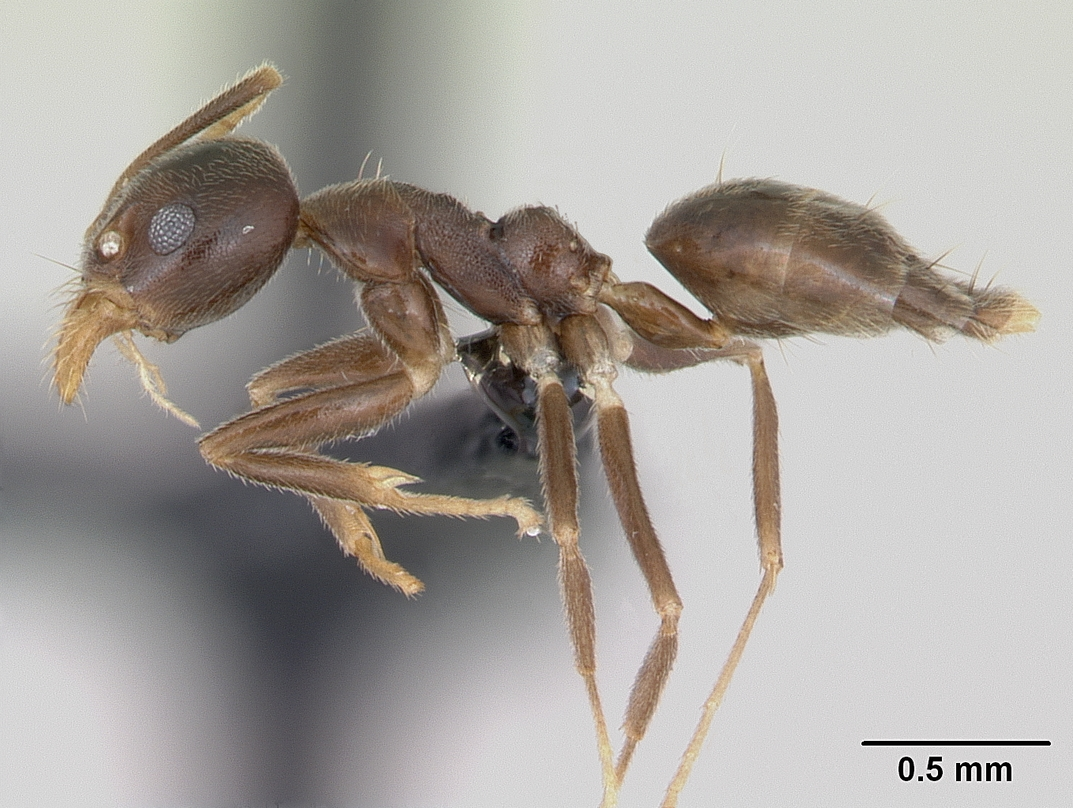

Scientific classification
- Kingdom: Animalia
- Phylum: Arthropoda
- Clade: Pancrustacea
- Class: Insecta
- Order: Hymenoptera
- Family: Formicidae
- Subfamily: Dolichoderinae
- Genus: Technomyrmex
- Species: T. gorgona

Binomial name
- Technomyrmex gorgona Fernandez, F. & Guerrero, R. J., 2008

= Technomyrmex gorgona =

Species of ant

Technomyrmex gorgona is a species of ant in the genus Technomyrmex. It's named after Gorgona National Park on Gorgona Island (Colombia), where the species is endemic.
