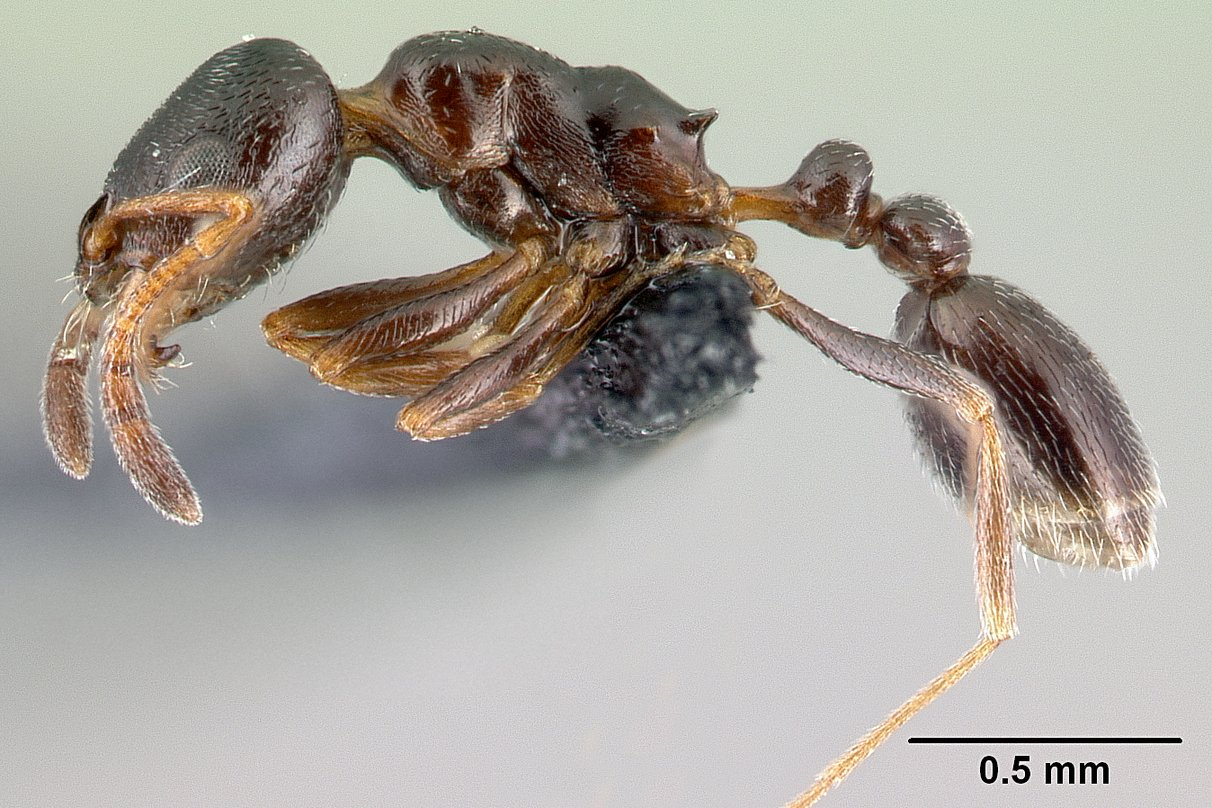
- Cardiocondyla elegans (Formicidae)

Scientific classification
- Domain: Eukaryota
- Kingdom: Animalia
- Phylum: Arthropoda
- Class: Insecta
- Order: Hymenoptera
- Family: Formicidae
- Subfamily: Myrmicinae
- Genus: Cardiocondyla
- Species: C. elegans

Binomial name
- Cardiocondyla elegans Emery, 1869

Subspecies
- Cardiocondyla elegans dalmatica Soudek, 1926; Cardiocondyla elegans elegans Emery, 1870; Cardiocondyla elegans eleonorae Forel, 1912; Cardiocondyla elegans gibbosa Kuznetzov Ugamsky 1928; Cardiocondyla elegans sahlbergi; Cardiocondyla elegans santschii; Cardiocondyla elegans schkaffi Arnoldi 1929; Cardiocondyla elegans torretassoi Finzi, 1937; Cardiocondyla elegans uljanini Emery 1890

Synonyms
- Cardiocondyla provincialis Bernard; Cardiocondyla semenowi Forel; Cardiocondyla schkaffi Arnoldi; Cardiocondyla santschii Forel; Xenometra gallica Bernard

= Cardiocondyla elegans =

Species of ant

Cardiocondyla elegans is an ant species in the genus Cardiocondyla found in the Mediterranean region.
