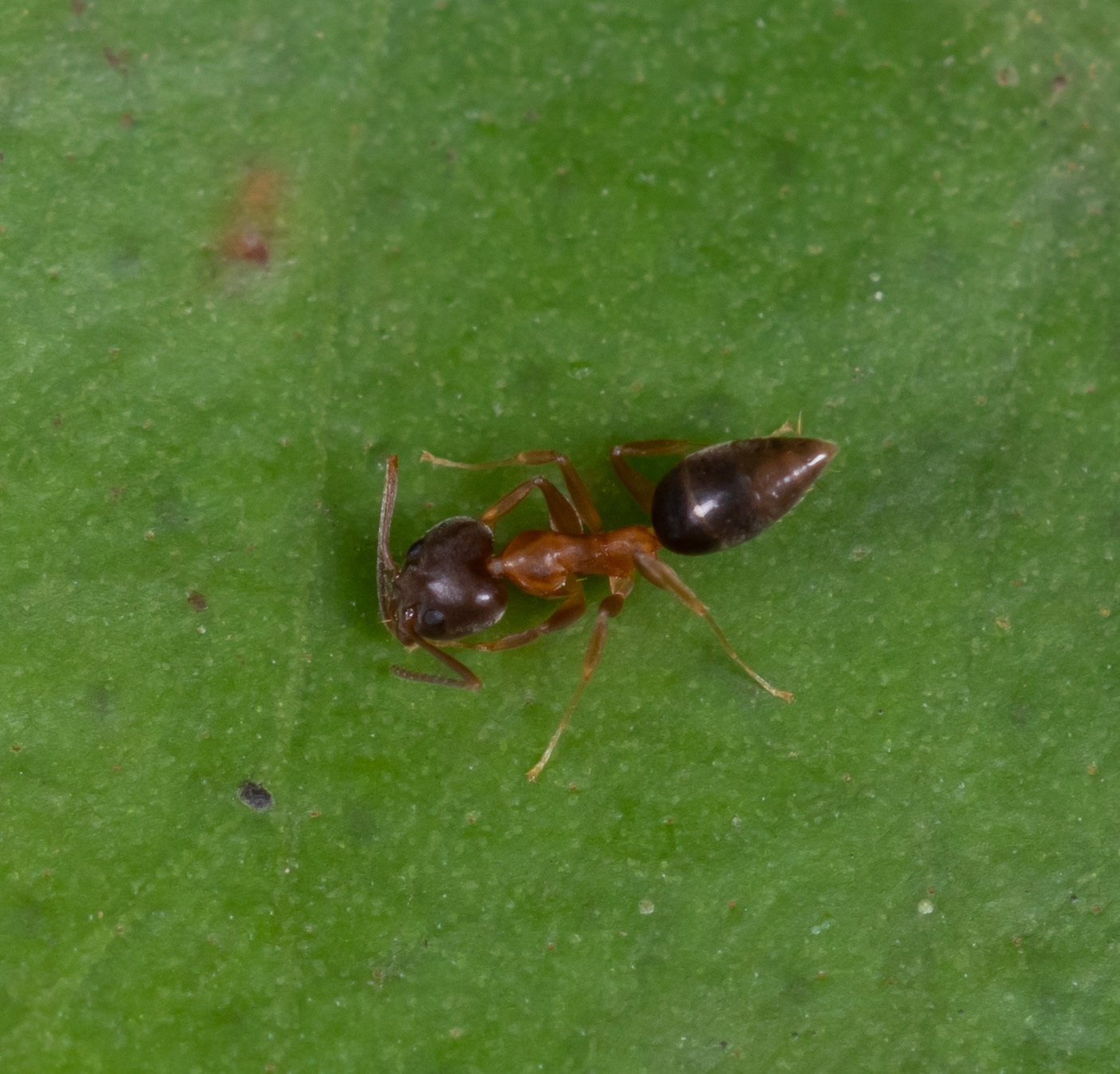
- Worker

Scientific classification
- Kingdom: Animalia
- Phylum: Arthropoda
- Clade: Pancrustacea
- Class: Insecta
- Order: Hymenoptera
- Family: Formicidae
- Subfamily: Dolichoderinae
- Genus: Technomyrmex
- Species: T. horni

Binomial name
- Technomyrmex horni Forel, 1912

= Technomyrmex horni =

Species of ant

Technomyrmex horni is a species of Dolichoderine ant which is a widespread species that can be found in many Indo-Australian, Oriental, and Palaearctic regions.

== Distribution ==
This widespread Asian ant can be found in Borneo, Brunei, Indonesia, Malaysia, Philippines, India, Cambodia, Sri Lanka, Taiwan, Thailand, and China.
