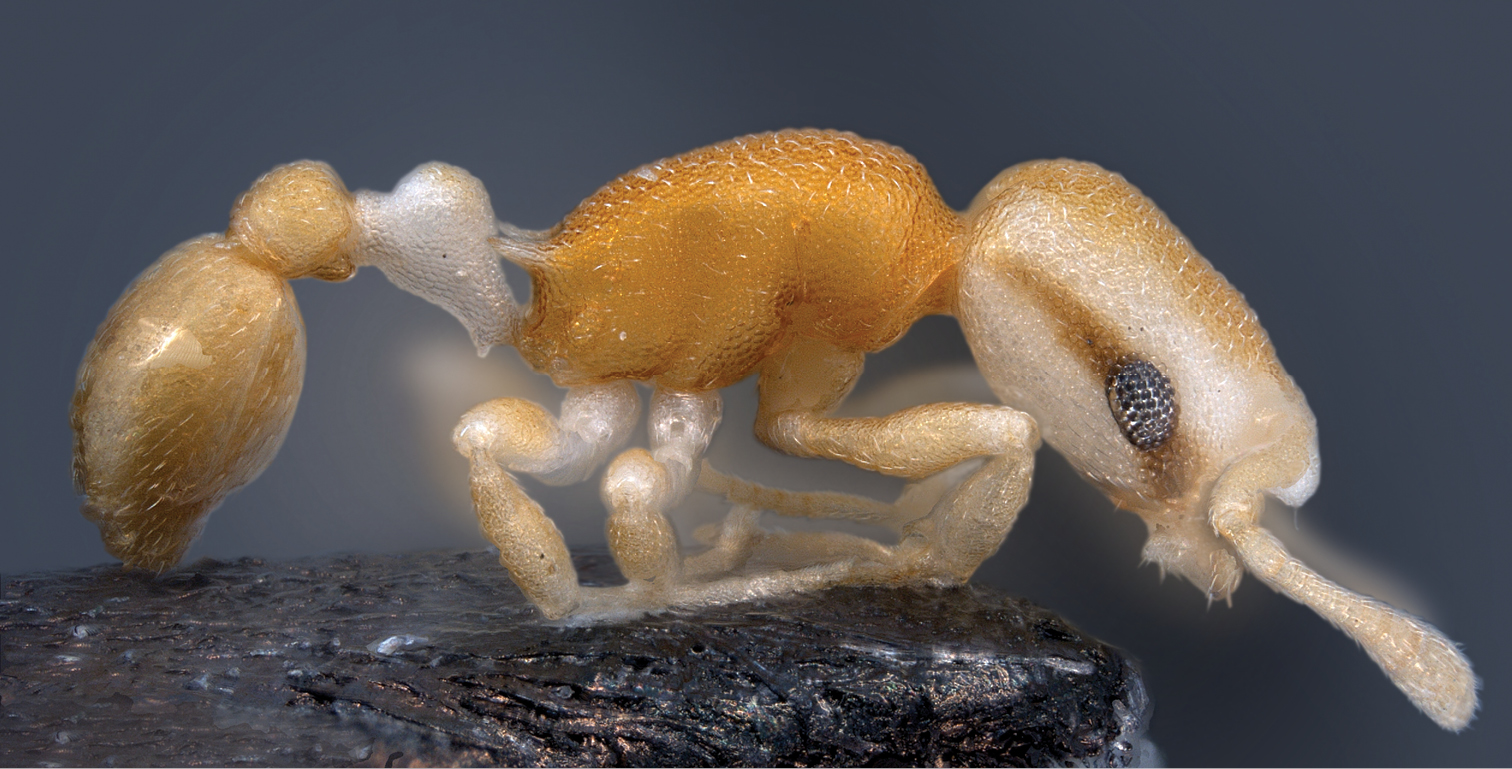
- C. pirata holotype worker

Scientific classification
- Domain: Eukaryota
- Kingdom: Animalia
- Phylum: Arthropoda
- Class: Insecta
- Order: Hymenoptera
- Family: Formicidae
- Subfamily: Myrmicinae
- Genus: Cardiocondyla
- Species: C. pirata

Binomial name
- Cardiocondyla pirata Seifert & Frohschammer, 2013

= Cardiocondyla pirata =

Species of ant

Cardiocondyla pirata, or pirate ant, is a species of ant in the subfamily Myrmicinae. Known from the Philippines, the female castes show a pigmentation pattern not known from any ant worldwide. Little is known about their biology.

== Description ==
Discovered in the Laguna, Philippines, the species belongs to an Indo-Malayan group of six species that is characterized by workers having a strongly bilobate postpetiolar sternite and a thickset mesosoma with strongly convex dorsal profile as well as wingless, ergatoid males with sickle-shaped mandibles. The female castes show a pigmentation pattern not known from any ant worldwide. If having any adaptive value, a possible function of this structure is supposed to be visual dissolution of body shape in order to irritate predators.

== Pigmentation pattern ==
C. pirata cannot be confused with any ant worldwide because of its unique pigmentation pattern. The adaptive significance of the extraordinary pigmentation remains a puzzle. The poor resolution of the visual system (workers and males have only 50–65 ommatidia per eye) and the dominance of chemical and tactile recognition cues in these ants as well as the fact that mating happens in darkness of the nest certainly exclude a function as an intraspecific recognition signal. A possible function could be visual dissolution of body shape by alternating dark and light pigment in order to escape the attention of a predator. The unpigmented petiole in particular, being in living condition rather translucent, permits the visual impression that anterior and posterior body are separate objects. The common name, pirate ant, and species epithet, pirata, refers to the black ribbon across the eye reminiscent of a pirate's blindfold.

== Biology ==
Little is known about their biology. The initial description of the species was based on two colonies: one complete colony consisting of three dealate queens, 15 workers and brood collected in the field, and a second colony used only for sampling. The first colony produced over 20 female sexuals and one ergatoid male in the lab, but thereafter died. Hence, there are no long-term observations on the life history of this species. Based on related species of the Oriental and Indo-Malayan region Seifert & Frohschammer (2013) predict the following biological traits: (a) there are only ergatoid males – winged males, which are an ancestral trait in Cardiocondyla, are no longer developed, (b) ergatoid males are long-lived, mate always inside the nest and try to kill rivals using their sickle-shaped mandibles in order to monopolize the matings and (c) nests should contain 1–4 queens.
