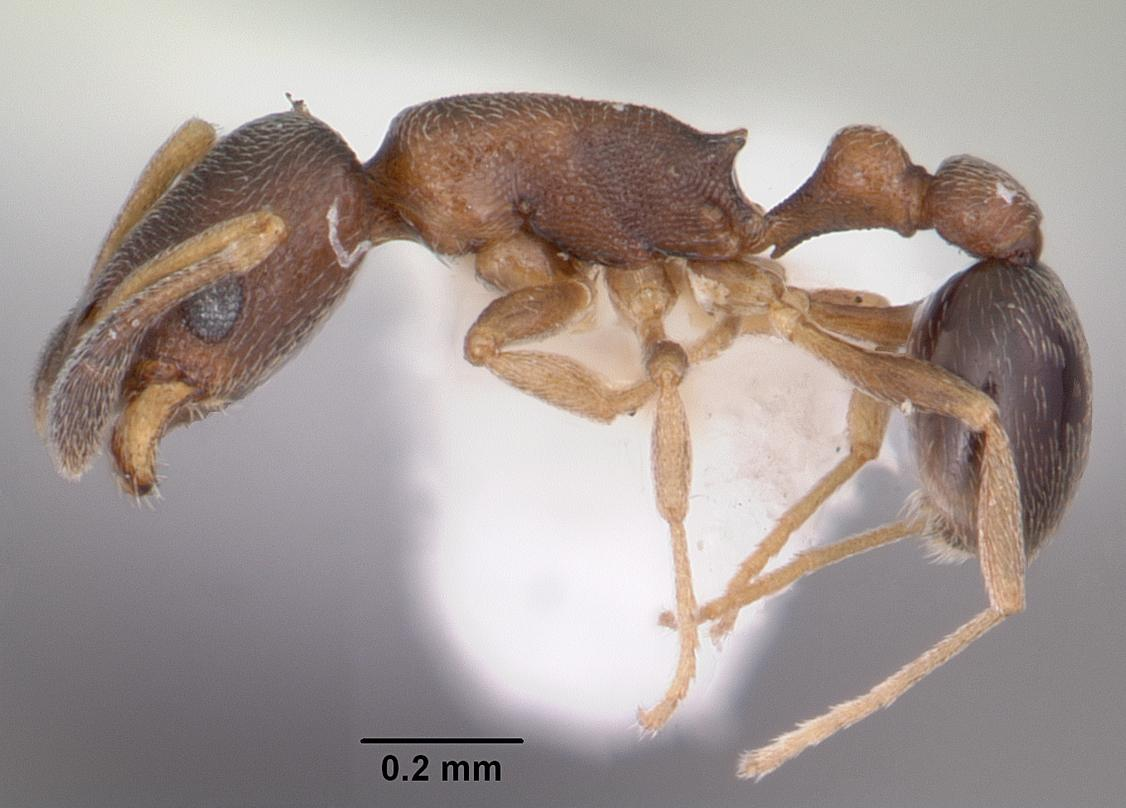
- C. minutior worker

Scientific classification
- Kingdom: Animalia
- Phylum: Arthropoda
- Clade: Pancrustacea
- Class: Insecta
- Order: Hymenoptera
- Family: Formicidae
- Subfamily: Myrmicinae
- Genus: Cardiocondyla
- Species: C. minutior

Binomial name
- Cardiocondyla minutior Forel, 1899

Synonyms
- Cardiocondyla tsukuyomi Terayama, 1999

= Cardiocondyla minutior =

Species of ant

Cardiocondyla minutior is a species of ant in the subfamily Myrmicinae.

== Distribution ==
New Zealand, Barbados, Costa Rica, Dominican Republic, Ecuador, Galapagos Islands, Greater Antilles, Guatemala, Honduras, Mexico, Guam, Hawaii, Indonesia, New Guinea, India, Nepal, Sri Lanka, Vietnam, and Japan.
