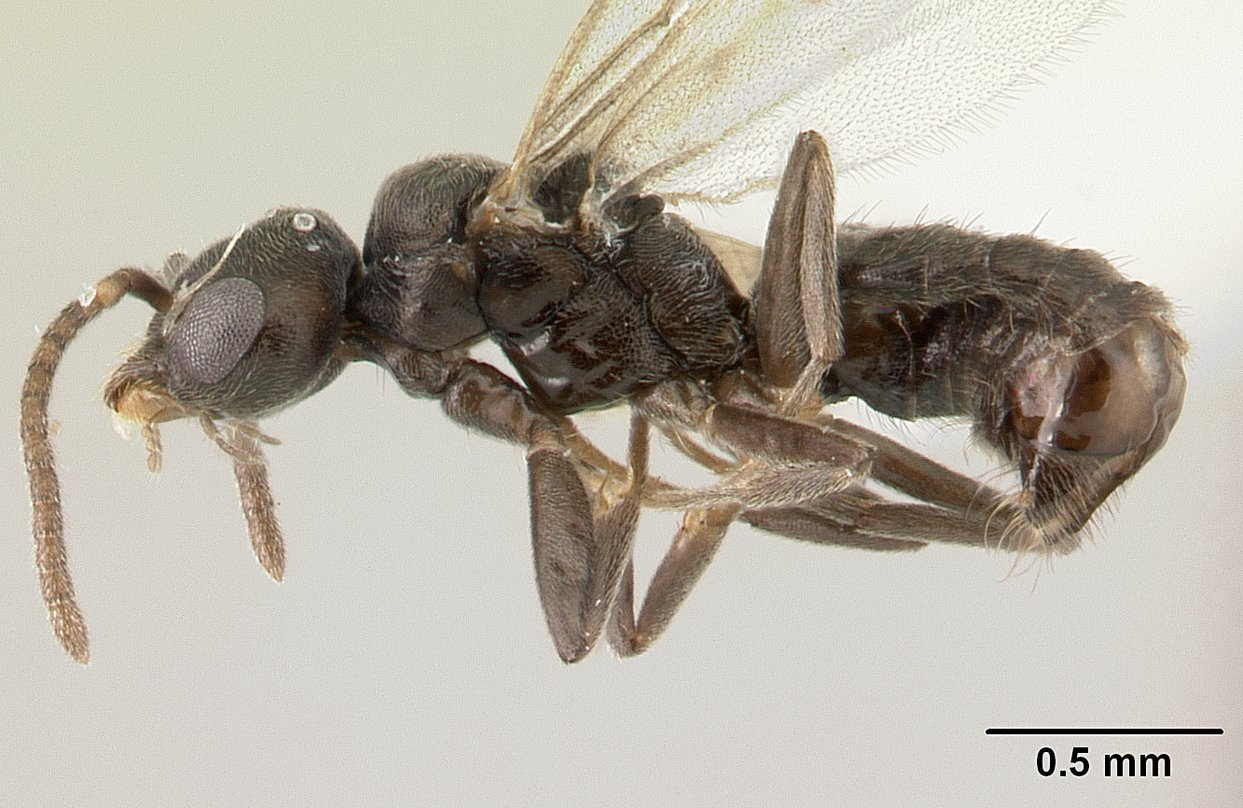
- A drone of Technomyrmex jocosus

Scientific classification
- Kingdom: Animalia
- Phylum: Arthropoda
- Class: Insecta
- Order: Hymenoptera
- Family: Formicidae
- Subfamily: Dolichoderinae
- Genus: Technomyrmex
- Species: T. jocosus

Binomial name
- Technomyrmex jocosus Forel, 1910

= Technomyrmex jocosus =

Species of insect

Technomyrmex jocosus is a species of ant in the genus Technomyrmex, and one of the species referred to as the white-footed ant.

== Description ==
Technomyrmex jocosus is often misidentified as Technomyrmex albipes, which also shares the common name of white-footed ant. However, T. jocosus workers measure to 3.0 to 3.4 mm (0.12 to 0.13 in) in length and have 12 segments in their antennae. A distinguishing feature that sets T. jocosus apart from T. albipes is the arrangement of the setae on their head, as T. jocosus has a pair of setae on the back of its head behind the eyes. Additionally, T. jocosus can be identified by its longer dorsal setae on its abdomen.

The head of T. joccus is shinier and less sculpted compared to T. albipes, and the compound eyes of T. jocosus are larger than those of T. albipes. T. jocosus also lacks a petiolar node, a section just before the abdomen, which differentiates it from other common ant genera within its distribution.

== Distribution and habitat ==
Technomyrmex jocosus is a very common Technomyrmex species that is native to Australia. This species can be found in both south-eastern and south-western Australia, particularly around moderately moist, thick wooded areas like forests. It can also be found nesting in suburban areas like fence posts, gardens and can often invade homes. However, T. jocosus has never been spotted in drier areas like the Outback. T. jocosus has also been spotted in New Zealand as an invasive species; while it can be detected and removed at national borders, its nests can be found in open country and forests.

T. jocosus can be found in suburban, forested and open areas in New Zealand's North Island. After they were accidentally introduced, they spread through the suburban areas of the North Island's ports and inhabit the moister open forests which they find suitable for nesting. Just like in Australia, T. jocosus can also be found underneath rotten logs, crevices, and even housing wall cavities which makes them a household pest. Populations of T. jocosus were found in parts of New Zealand's North Island, especially around Auckland and Wellington; however, the species has also been reported further the south, mainly around Marlborough but as far down as Christchurch.

T. jocosus is a ground-dwelling species that generally forages arboreally for food. They also farm wild hemipteran species such as aphids for honeydew. In Australia, large numbers of T. jocosus were found around Kauri trees (Eucalyptus diversicolor). T. jocosus primarily inhabits moderately moist habitats, dead wood, crevices and large cracks in stones and even underneath tree bark, which is important for their foraging habits as they look for prey and honeydew.

== Nest formation ==
T. jocosus's phenology is relatively unknown, though parallels may be referenced from describing the closely related species T. albipes. Technomyrmex species, especially T. albipes, have been known to send winged queens out on nuptial flights synchronously in May to mid-June to begin new nests; these queens will mate with males outside and from the same nest to ensure the eggs are fertilized for new nests. Once arriving at a suitable location a new nest is formed and eventually the queen's job of laying eggs will be taken by intercastes (wingless females with reproductive organs) who have mated with wingless males outside the nest.

Once the colony has been established, most of the egg-laying is done by the many intercastes within the nest which have spermatheca. Though the queen may still exist in the nest, she becomes dealate and loses her wings. The queens have a much larger body size to begin the initial creation of the nests' population and are capable of laying many more eggs than intercastes.

== Diet and foraging ==
T. jocosus is a generalist scavenger, often foraging on open and forested habitats. Not only do they search leaf litter and shrubs, they also forage arboreally and through mutualism with particular homopterans (leafhoppers) which the ants farm for honeydew. Interestingly, food is not distributed through trophallaxis, but from special trophic eggs that are not meant for reproduction, but for consumption by colony members.

== Predators and parasites ==
Epacteon latifrons, a parasitic fly, is thought to have originated in Australia but has been observed attacking worker T. jocosus in New Zealand.

The third instar of an Australian green lacewing species preys upon the pupae of Technomyrmex and other ant genera within their nests. Italochrysa insignis larvae enter the brooding chamber and feed on Technomyrmex larvae.
