= Technomyrmex elatior =

Scientific classification
- Kingdom: Animalia
- Phylum: Arthropoda
- Clade: Pancrustacea
- Class: Insecta
- Order: Hymenoptera
- Family: Formicidae
- Subfamily: Dolichoderinae
- Genus: Technomyrmex
- Species: T. elatior

Binomial name
- Technomyrmex elatior Forel, 1902

Species of ant

Technomyrmex elatior is a species of dolichoderine ant which is a widespread species that can be found in many Indo-Australian, Oriental, and Palaearctic regions.

== Distribution ==
This widespread Asian ant can be found in Borneo, Brunei, Indonesia, Malaysia, Philippines, Singapore, Cambodia, India, Nepal, Sri Lanka, Vietnam, China, and Italy.
