= Trichomyrmex rogeri =

Scientific classification
- Kingdom: Animalia
- Phylum: Arthropoda
- Clade: Pancrustacea
- Class: Insecta
- Order: Hymenoptera
- Family: Formicidae
- Subfamily: Myrmicinae
- Genus: Trichomyrmex
- Species: T. rogeri

Binomial name
- Trichomyrmex rogeri Mayr, 1865

Species of ant

Trichomyrmex rogeri is a species of ant in the subfamily Myrmicinae. It is found in Sri Lanka. Gustav Mayr described the species in 1865.
