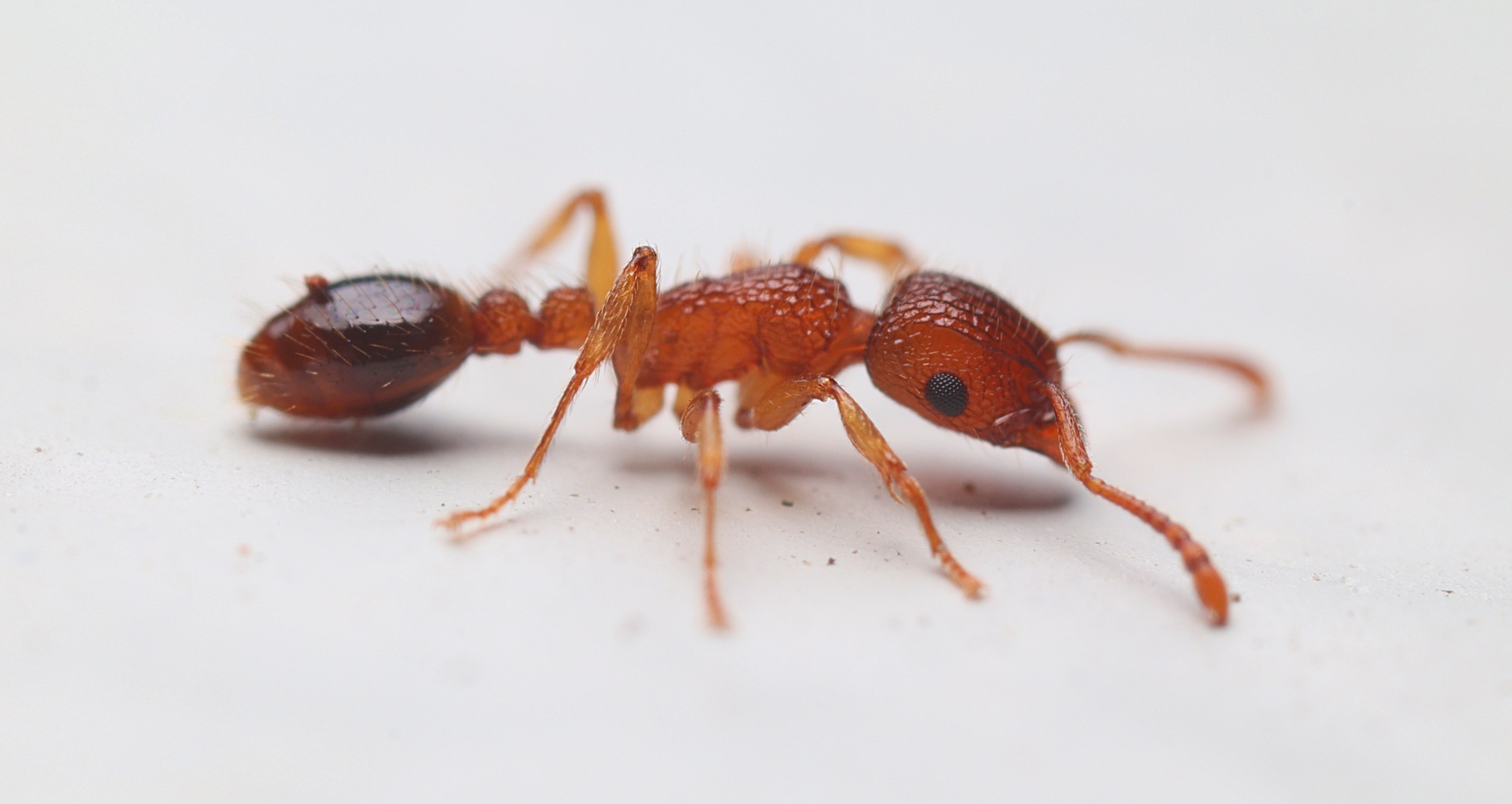
- Tetramorium bicarinatum worker

Scientific classification
- Kingdom: Animalia
- Phylum: Arthropoda
- Clade: Pancrustacea
- Class: Insecta
- Order: Hymenoptera
- Family: Formicidae
- Subfamily: Myrmicinae
- Genus: Tetramorium
- Species: T. bicarinatum

Binomial name
- Tetramorium bicarinatum (Nylander, 1846)

= Tetramorium bicarinatum =

Species of ant

Tetramorium bicarinatum, is a species of ant of the family Formicidae in the order Hymenoptera that originated in South East Asia.

== Morphology ==
It is a reddish headed medium-sized ant, with mesosoma and waist contrasting with a dark gaster.

== Habitat ==
The species can adversely affect native biodiversity. It is also said to be a common tramp species which is usually found inside of houses, in greenhouses and shade houses, or in landscaped areas near houses.

== Venom ==
The Tetramorium bicarinatum's venom arrangement shows potential for a new pharmacologically active substance, bicarinalin. This antibacterial, antimicrobial, and anti-infective compound could potentially be chemically synthesized to combat antibiotic-resistant pathogens by means of drug therapy.
