= Callicerastis =

Scientific classification
- Kingdom: Animalia
- Phylum: Arthropoda
- Clade: Pancrustacea
- Class: Insecta
- Order: Lepidoptera
- Family: Tineidae
- Subfamily: Erechthiinae
- Genus: Callicerastis; Meyrick, 1916
- Species: C. stagmatias

Binomial name
- Callicerastis stagmatias Meyrick, 1916

Genus of moths

Callicerastis stagmatias is a fungus moth (family Tineidae) of the subfamily Erechthiinae.

It is provisionally separated in the monotypic genus Callicerastis, but it may belong in the related larger genus Erechthias.
