= Trichomyrmex criniceps =

Scientific classification
- Kingdom: Animalia
- Phylum: Arthropoda
- Clade: Pancrustacea
- Class: Insecta
- Order: Hymenoptera
- Family: Formicidae
- Subfamily: Myrmicinae
- Genus: Trichomyrmex
- Species: T. criniceps

Binomial name
- Trichomyrmex criniceps (Mayr, 1879)

Synonyms
- Holcomyrmex criniceps niger Forel, 1902; Holcomyrmex criniceps ruber Forel, 1903

Species of ant

Trichomyrmex criniceps is a species of ant in the subfamily Myrmicinae. It is found from India and Sri Lanka.
