= Mecomodica =

Scientific classification
- Kingdom: Animalia
- Phylum: Arthropoda
- Clade: Pancrustacea
- Class: Insecta
- Order: Lepidoptera
- Family: Tineidae
- Genus: Mecomodica; Zimmerman, 1978
- Species: M. fullawayi

Binomial name
- Mecomodica fullawayi (Swezey, 1926)

Synonyms
- Comodica fullawayi Swezey, 1926

Species of moth

Mecomodica fullawayi is a fungus moth (family Tineidae) of the subfamily Erechthiinae. It was first described by Otto Swezey in 1926.

It is provisionally separated in the monotypic genus Mecomodica, described by Elwood Zimmerman in 1978, but it may belong in the related larger genera Comodica or Erechthias.

It is only known from Kure Island in the Pacific Ocean. Adults are small and mostly yellow.
