= Petula phalarata =

Scientific classification
- Kingdom: Animalia
- Phylum: Arthropoda
- Clade: Pancrustacea
- Class: Insecta
- Order: Lepidoptera
- Family: Tineidae
- Subfamily: Erechthiinae
- Genus: Petula; Clarke, 1971
- Species: P. phalarata

Binomial name
- Petula phalarata Clarke, 1971

Genus of moths

Petula phalarata is a species of moths belonging to the family Tineidae, described from Rapa Iti. It is currently the only species in the genus Petula.

The wingspan is 9–16 millimetres (0.35–0.63 in). The forewing ground color is fuscous black, on the middle of the dorsum with a cream buff spot (in females, the spot is suffused, larger, and not as sharply defined as in males), sometimes extended as a narrow cream buff line on the dorsal edge. At the end of the cell is an ill-defined black spot. The hindwings are grey, paler basally, with a brassy hue.
