= Technomyrmex bicolor =

Scientific classification
- Kingdom: Animalia
- Phylum: Arthropoda
- Clade: Pancrustacea
- Class: Insecta
- Order: Hymenoptera
- Family: Formicidae
- Subfamily: Dolichoderinae
- Genus: Technomyrmex
- Species: T. bicolor

Binomial name
- Technomyrmex bicolor Emery, 1893

Species of ant

Technomyrmex bicolor is a species of dolichoderine ant first described from Sri Lanka in 1893.

The species is also found in China.
