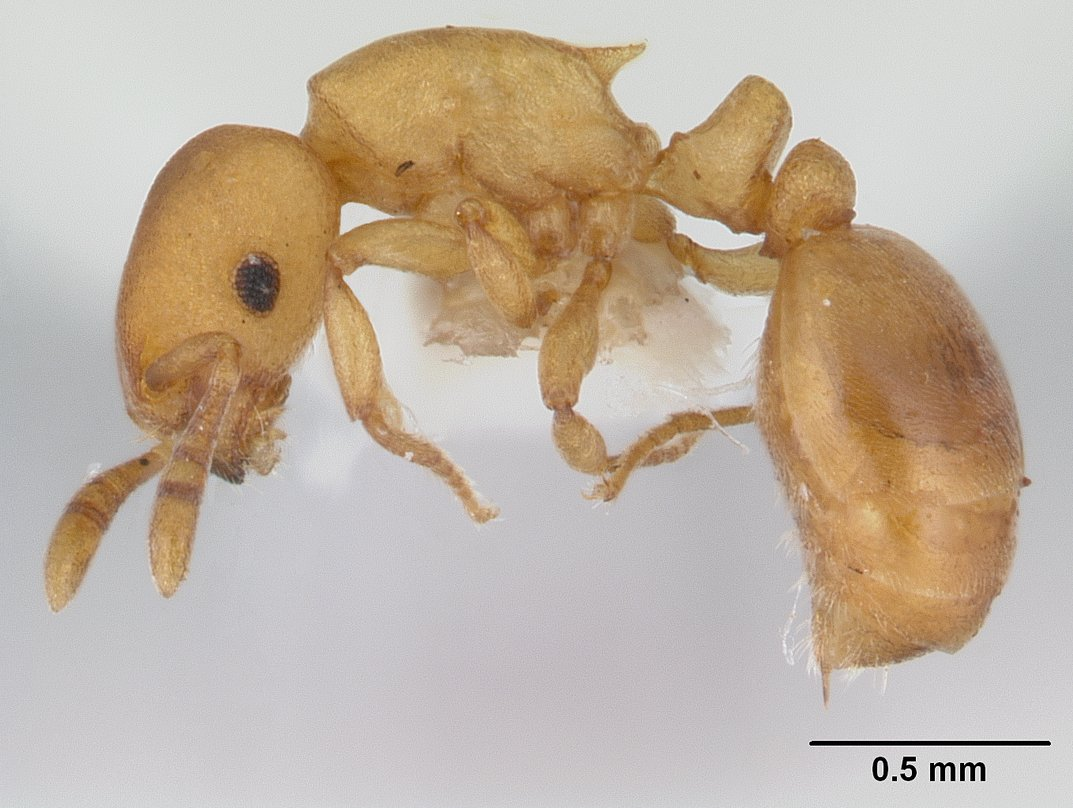
- Stereomyrmex horni worker

Scientific classification
- Kingdom: Animalia
- Phylum: Arthropoda
- Clade: Pancrustacea
- Class: Insecta
- Order: Hymenoptera
- Family: Formicidae
- Subfamily: Myrmicinae
- Genus: Stereomyrmex
- Species: S. horni

Binomial name
- Stereomyrmex horni Emery, 1901

= Stereomyrmex horni =

Species of ant

Stereomyrmex horni is a species of ant in the genus Stereomyrmex. It is found in Sri Lanka.
