= Cardiocondyla obscurior =

Scientific classification
- Kingdom: Animalia
- Phylum: Arthropoda
- Clade: Pancrustacea
- Class: Insecta
- Order: Hymenoptera
- Family: Formicidae
- Subfamily: Myrmicinae
- Genus: Cardiocondyla
- Species: C. obscurior

Binomial name
- Cardiocondyla obscurior Wheeler, 1929

Species of ant

Cardiocondyla obscurior is a species of ant native to Costa Rica, though there have been reports of it appearing in other countries as well. Unlike most members of the Cardiocondyla family, it tends to be arboreal, nesting in the plant cavities of low vegetation.

This ant is light brown or orange, with a darker gaster. Like many members of Cardiocondyla, it has both wingless and winged males, with the latter only being hatched during the stress of a temperature drop of 5 °C.
