= Phthinocola =

Scientific classification
- Kingdom: Animalia
- Phylum: Arthropoda
- Clade: Pancrustacea
- Class: Insecta
- Order: Lepidoptera
- Family: Tineidae
- Genus: Phthinocola; Meyrick, 1886

Genus of moths

Phthinocola is a genus of moths belonging to the family Tineidae.

This genus contains only one species: Phthinocola dochmia Meyrick, which was described in Transactions of the Entomological Society of London by lepidopterist Edward Meyrick in 1886. This species is found in Tonga. It has a wingspan of 9mm.
