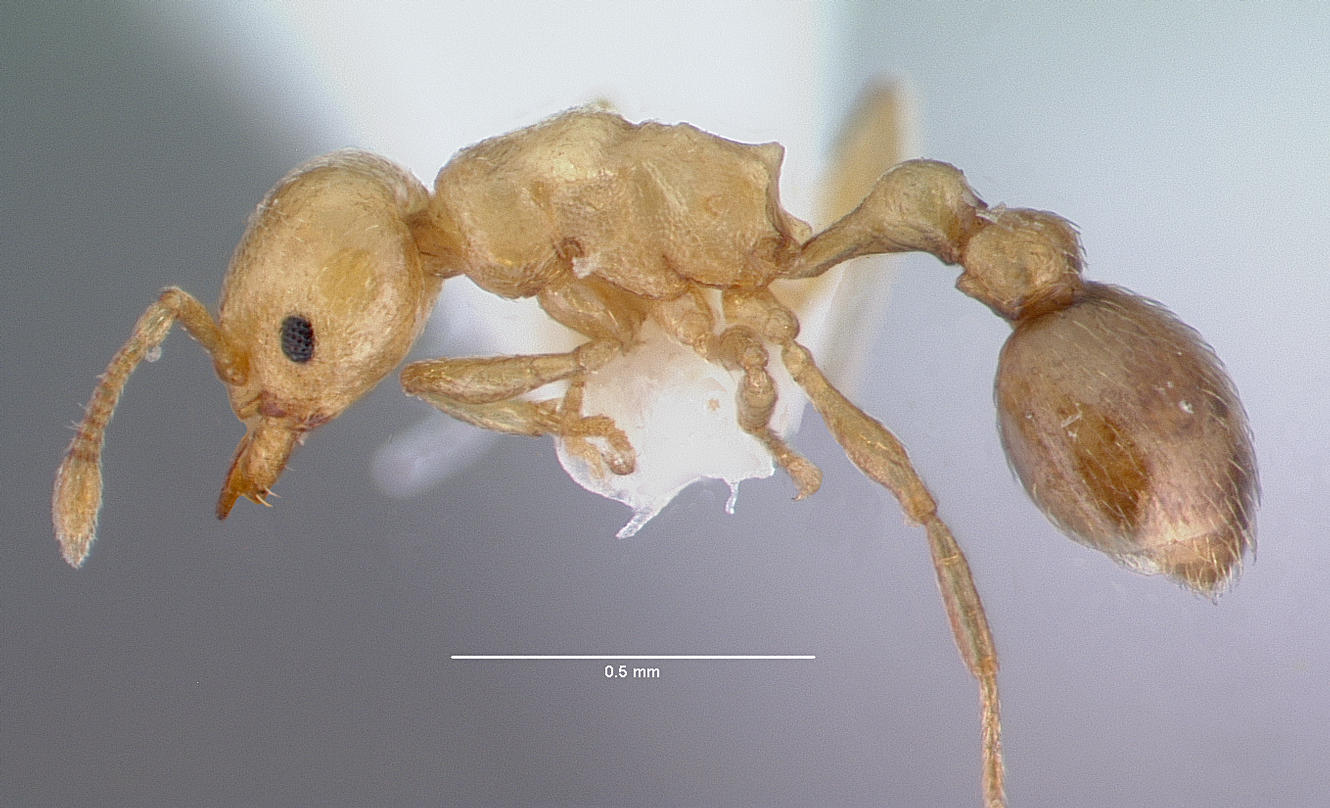
- C. wroughtonii ergatoid male

Scientific classification
- Kingdom: Animalia
- Phylum: Arthropoda
- Clade: Pancrustacea
- Class: Insecta
- Order: Hymenoptera
- Family: Formicidae
- Subfamily: Myrmicinae
- Tribe: Crematogastrini
- Alliance: Cataulacus genus group
- Genus: Cardiocondyla; Emery, 1869

Type species
- Cardiocondyla elegans Emery, 1869

Diversity
- 88 species

Synonyms
- Dyclona Santschi, 1930; Emeryia Forel, 1890; Loncyda Santschi, 1930; Prosopidris Wheeler, 1935; Xenometra Emery, 1917

= Cardiocondyla =

Genus of ants

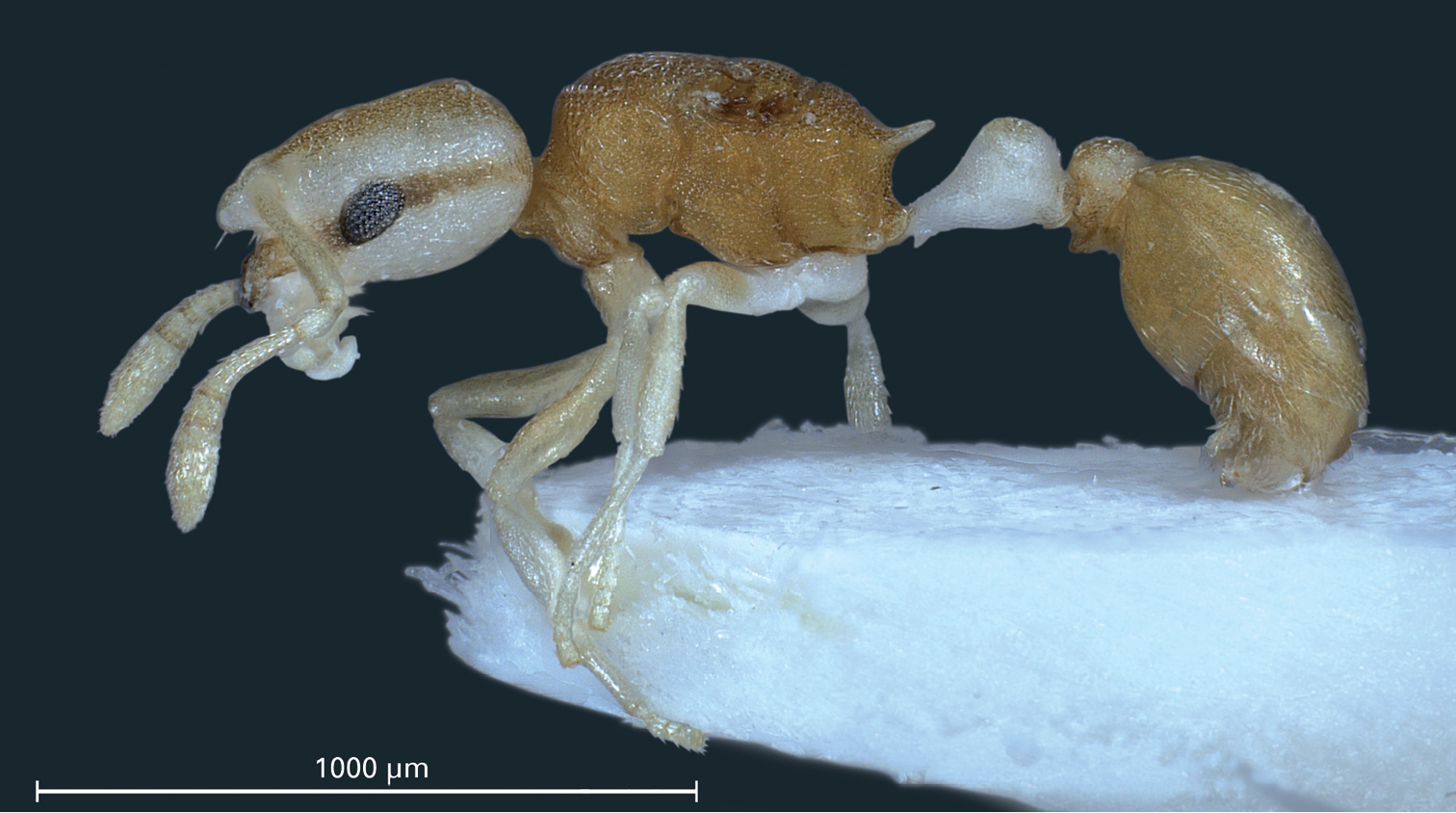
Cardiocondyla pirata paratype

Cardiocondyla is an Old World genus of ants in the subfamily Myrmicinae.

== Distribution ==
Approximately 90 species are currently recognized as belonging to this genus, most of which are distributed in the Old World tropics and subtropics, but a few of which occur in the temperate zone. Some species are also found widely separated in North America and the Pacific Islands, as a result of human introduction.

== Description ==
Several species of this genus have a striking male polymorphism, with both winged and wingless forms. These males differ not only in morphology, but also in reproductive tactics. Closely related genera are Leptothorax, Stereomyrmex and Romblonella.

== Outbreeding ==
Cardiocondyla elegans worker ants transport young queen ants to alien nests to promote outbreeding. This allows avoidance of inbreeding depression. The worker ants, sisters of these queens, may transport the queens several meters from their natal nest and drop them off at another, alien nest to promote outbreeding with wingless stationary males in a process somewhat analogous to third party matchmaking in humans. After mating during the winter, the sexual females may depart in the spring and find their own colonies.

== Species ==
As of 2026, Cardiocondyla contains 88 valid species, including 87 extant and one extinct.

=== Extant ===
- Cardiocondyla allonivalis Seifert, 2023
- Cardiocondyla argentea Seifert, 2023
- Cardiocondyla argyrotricha Seifert, 2023
- Cardiocondyla atalanta Forel, 1915
- Cardiocondyla batesii Forel, 1894
- Cardiocondyla brachyceps Seifert, 2003
- Cardiocondyla britteni Crawley, 1920
- Cardiocondyla bulgarica Forel, 1892
- Cardiocondyla carbonaria Forel, 1907
- Cardiocondyla caspiense Seifert, 2023
- Cardiocondyla compressa Seifert, 2017
- Cardiocondyla cristata (Santschi, 1912)
- Cardiocondyla dalmatica Soudek, 1925
- Cardiocondyla dalmaticoides Seifert, 2023
- Cardiocondyla elegans Emery, 1869
- Cardiocondyla emeryi Forel, 1881
- Cardiocondyla excavata Seifert, 2023
- Cardiocondyla fajumensis Forel, 1913
- Cardiocondyla gallagheri Collingwood & Agosti, 1996
- Cardiocondyla gallilaeica Seifert, 2003
- Cardiocondyla gibbosa Kuznetsov-Ugamsky, 1927
- Cardiocondyla goa Seifert, 2003
- Cardiocondyla goroka Seifert, 2023
- Cardiocondyla hashemi Sharaf, 2024
- Cardiocondyla heinzei Seifert, 2024
- Cardiocondyla israelica Seifert, 2003
- Cardiocondyla itsukii Seifert et al., 2017
- Cardiocondyla jacquemini Bernard, 1953
- Cardiocondyla kagutsuchi Terayama, 1999
- Cardiocondyla kazanensis Terayama, 2013
- Cardiocondyla koshewnikovi Ruzsky, 1902
- Cardiocondyla kushanica Pisarski, 1967
- Cardiocondyla latifrons Seifert, 2023
- Cardiocondyla littoralis Seifert, 2003
- Cardiocondyla longiceps Seifert, 2003
- Cardiocondyla longinoda Rigato, 2002
- Cardiocondyla luciae Rigato, 2002
- Cardiocondyla mauritanica Forel, 1890
- Cardiocondyla melana Seifert, 2003
- Cardiocondyla micropila Seifert, 2023
- Cardiocondyla minutior Forel, 1899
- Cardiocondyla monardi Santschi, 1930
- Cardiocondyla nana Seifert, 2003
- Cardiocondyla neferka Bolton, 1982
- Cardiocondyla nigra Forel, 1905
- Cardiocondyla nigrocerea Karavaiev, 1935
- Cardiocondyla nivalis Mann, 1919
- Cardiocondyla nuda (Mayr, 1866)
- Cardiocondyla obscurior Wheeler, 1929
- Cardiocondyla opaca Seifert, 2003
- Cardiocondyla opistopsis Seifert, 2003
- Cardiocondyla papuana (Reiskind, 1965)
- Cardiocondyla paradoxa Emery, 1897
- Cardiocondyla paranuda Seifert, 2003
- Cardiocondyla parvinoda Forel, 1902
- Cardiocondyla persiana Seifert, 2003
- Cardiocondyla pirata Seifert & Frohschammer, 2013
- Cardiocondyla rolandi Seifert, 2023
- Cardiocondyla rugulosa Seifert, 2003
- Cardiocondyla sahlbergi Forel, 1913
- Cardiocondyla schulzi Seifert, 2023
- Cardiocondyla sekhemka Bolton, 1982
- Cardiocondyla semiargentea Seifert, 2023
- Cardiocondyla semirubra Seifert, 2003
- Cardiocondyla shagrinata Seifert, 2003
- Cardiocondyla shuckardi Forel, 1891
- Cardiocondyla sima Wheeler, 1935
- Cardiocondyla stambuloffii Forel, 1892
- Cardiocondyla strigifrons Viehmeyer, 1922
- Cardiocondyla subspina Seifert, 2023
- Cardiocondyla sulcata Seifert, 2023
- Cardiocondyla tenuifrons Seifert, 2003
- Cardiocondyla thoracica (Smith, 1859)
- Cardiocondyla tibetana Seifert, 2003
- Cardiocondyla tiwarii Ghosh, Sheela & Kundu, 2005
- Cardiocondyla tjibodana Karavaiev, 1935
- Cardiocondyla ulianini Emery, 1889
- Cardiocondyla unicalis Seifert, 2003
- Cardiocondyla venustula Wheeler, 1908
- Cardiocondyla verdensis Seifert, 2023
- Cardiocondyla weserka Bolton, 1982
- Cardiocondyla wheeleri Viehmeyer, 1914
- Cardiocondyla wroughtonii (Forel, 1890)
- Cardiocondyla yemeni Collingwood & Agosti, 1996
- Cardiocondyla yoruba Rigato, 2002
- Cardiocondyla zhoui Huang et al., 2026
- Cardiocondyla zoserka Bolton, 1982

=== Extinct ===
- †Cardiocondyla primitiva Radchenko & Khomych, 2025

=== Unidentifiable ===
One species in the genus has been noted to be unidentifiable to species level as its descriptions was lost or too vague and the type specimens lost, although it theoretically remains a valid binomen. It is listed below.

- Cardiocondyla humilis (Smith, 1858)
