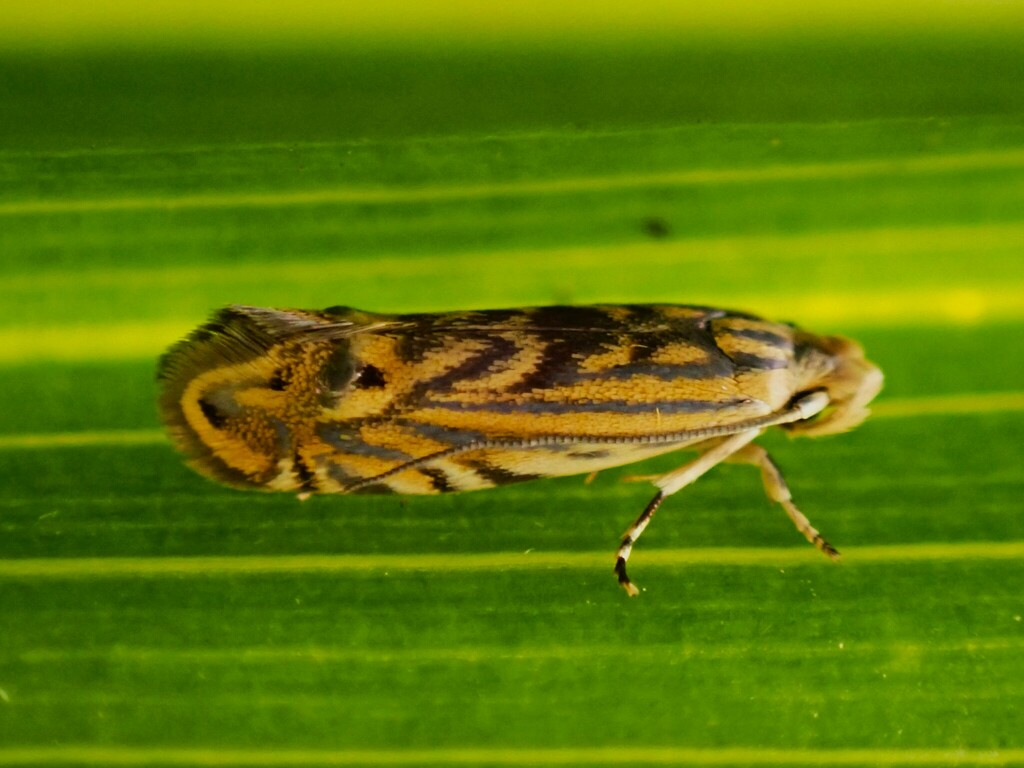

Scientific classification
- Kingdom: Animalia
- Phylum: Arthropoda
- Clade: Pancrustacea
- Class: Insecta
- Order: Lepidoptera
- Family: Tineidae
- Genus: Pisistrata
- Species: P. trypheropa

Binomial name
- Pisistrata trypheropa Meyrick, 1924

= Pisistrata =

Genus of moths

Pisistrata is a genus of moths belonging to the family Tineidae.

It contains only one species: Pisistrata trypheropa Meyrick, 1924 from the Cook Islands.
