= Comodica =

Scientific classification
- Kingdom: Animalia
- Phylum: Arthropoda
- Clade: Pancrustacea
- Class: Insecta
- Order: Lepidoptera
- Family: Tineidae
- Subfamily: Erechthiinae
- Genus: Comodica; Meyrick, 1880

Type species
- Comodica tetracercella Meyrick, 1880

Species
- 11, but see text

Synonyms
- Biastolemma J.F.G.Clarke, 1971

Genus of moths

Comodica is a small genus of the fungus moth family, Tineidae. Therein, it belongs to the subfamily Erechthiinae. It is apparently a close relative of the type genus of its subfamily, Erechthias.

It is usually delimited sensu stricto, making it a smallish genus, with 11 species presently placed here:

- Comodica cirrhopolia (Turner, 1923)
- Comodica coarctata (J.F.G.Clarke, 1971)
- Comodica crypsicroca Turner, 1923
- Comodica drepanosema Turner, 1923
- Comodica lucinda Meyrick, 1927
- Comodica ordinata Walsingham, 1914
- Comodica polygrapta Meyrick, 1924
- Comodica semiades Bradley, 1956
- Comodica signata J.F.G.Clarke, 1986
- Comodica tetracercella Meyrick, 1880
- Comodica tigrina Turner, 1917

Erechthias and Comodica are not unequivocally delimited against each other yet. Some species of the former are occasionally placed in the present genus, namely:

- Erechthias citrinopa
- Erechthias contributa
- Erechthias decaspila
- Erechthias dochmogramma
- Erechthias epispora
- Erechthias eurynipha
- Erechthias saitoi

Mecomodica fullawayi is also sometimes placed in Comodica; it might alternatively belong in Erechthias or represent a distinct lineage not much closer to either of the two than to the other.
