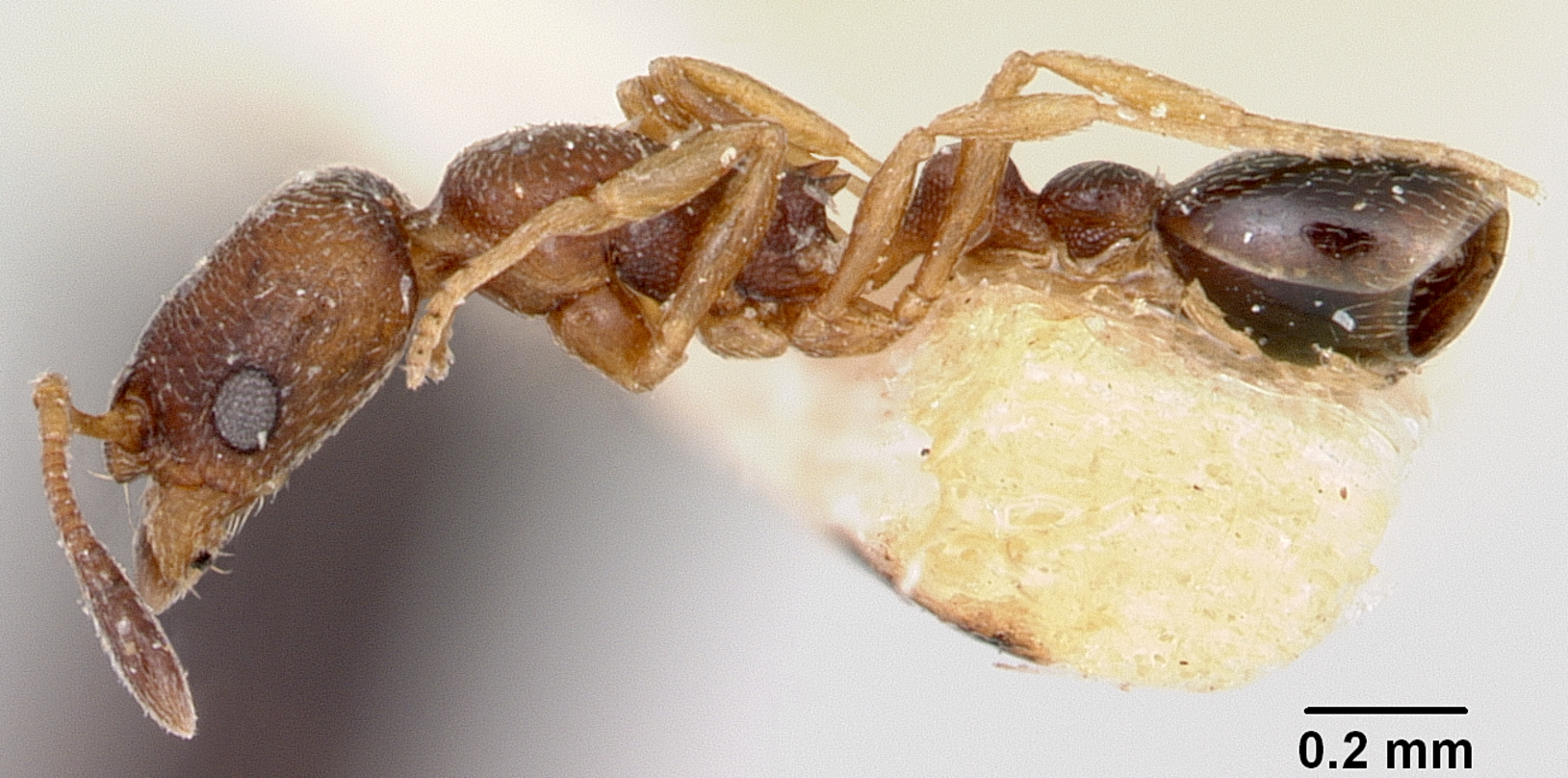
- C. emeryi worker

Scientific classification
- Kingdom: Animalia
- Phylum: Arthropoda
- Clade: Pancrustacea
- Class: Insecta
- Order: Hymenoptera
- Family: Formicidae
- Subfamily: Myrmicinae
- Genus: Cardiocondyla
- Species: C. emeryi

Binomial name
- Cardiocondyla emeryi Forel, 1881

Synonyms
- Cardiocondyla emeryi mahdii Karavaiev, 1911; Cardiocondyla emeryi rasalamae Forel, 1891; Cardiocondyla mauritia Donisthorpe, 1946; Cardiocondyla nuda nereis Wheeler, W.M., 1927; Xenometra monilicornis Emery, 1917

= Cardiocondyla emeryi =

Species of ant

Cardiocondyla emeryi is a species of ant in the subfamily Myrmicinae. There are two subspecies recognized. The type subspecies is found in numerous countries, through its large introduced range.

== Subspecies ==
- Cardiocondyla emeryi emeryi Forel, 1881
- Cardiocondyla emeryi fezzanensis Bernard, 1948 - Algeria

== Distribution ==
The species is distributed in Angola, Botswana, Cameroun, Colombia, Comoros, Ghana, Kenya, Mozambique, Nigeria, Rwanda, Saint Helena, Saudi Arabia, South Africa, Sudan, Tanzania, Uganda, United Arab Emirates, Yemen, Zimbabwe, Borneo, Cook Islands, Fiji, French Polynesia, Hawaii, Niue, Samoa, Tonga, Madagascar, Mauritius, Seychelles, United States, Bahamas, Barbados, Bermuda, Brazil, British Virgin Islands, Costa Rica, Cuba, Dominican Republic, Ecuador, Galapagos Islands, Haiti, Honduras, Mexico, Netherlands Antilles, Puerto Rico, Puerto Rico, Turks and Caicos Islands, Sri Lanka, Thailand, Vietnam, Canary Islands, Egypt, Iran, Israel, Spain and Switzerland.
