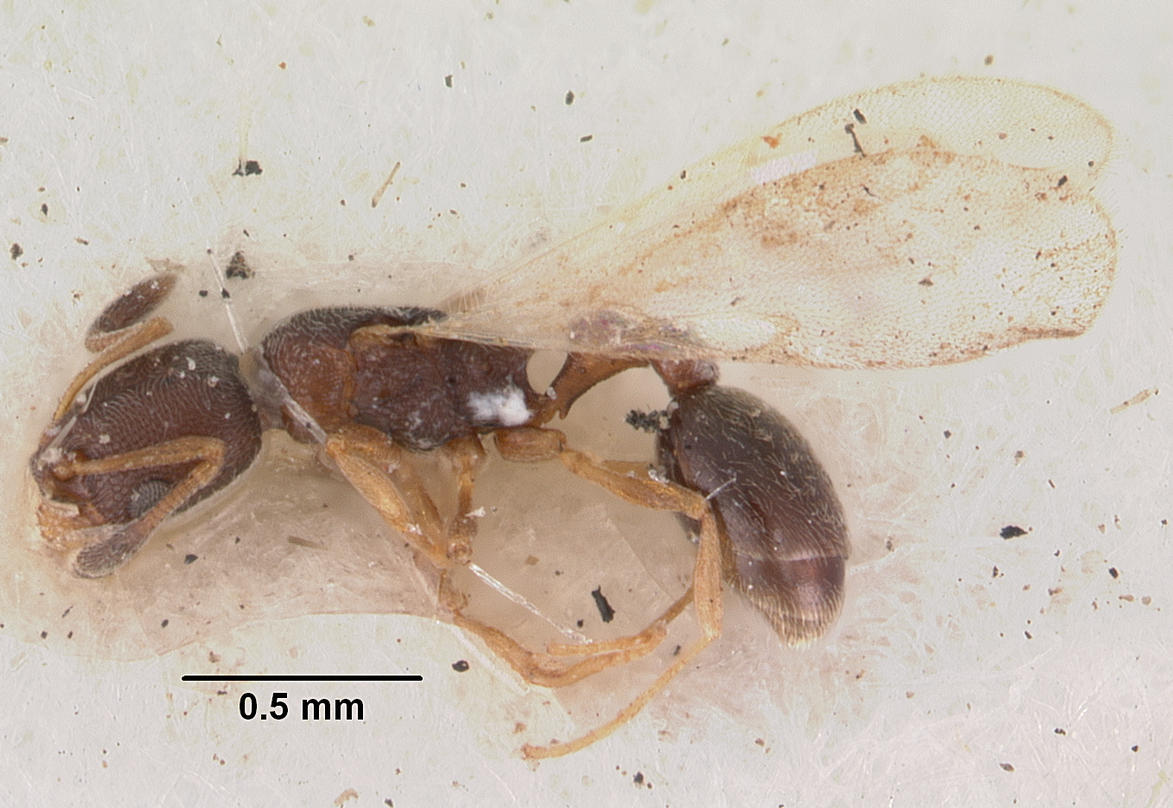

Scientific classification
- Kingdom: Animalia
- Phylum: Arthropoda
- Clade: Pancrustacea
- Class: Insecta
- Order: Hymenoptera
- Family: Formicidae
- Subfamily: Myrmicinae
- Genus: Cardiocondyla
- Species: C. nuda

Binomial name
- Cardiocondyla nuda (Mayr, 1866)

= Cardiocondyla nuda =

Species of ant

Cardiocondyla nuda is a species of ant in the subfamily Myrmicinae. It is a widespread ant species, and not invasive in nature.

== Subspecies ==
- Cardiocondyla nuda fajumensis Forel, 1913
- Cardiocondyla nuda nuda Mayr, 1866 - See below
- Cardiocondyla nuda sculptinodis Santschi, 1913 - Madagascar
- Cardiocondyla nuda shuckardoides Forel, 1895
- Cardiocondyla nuda strigifrons Viehmeyer, 1922

== Distribution ==
Australia, Cook Islands, Fiji, Hawaii, Kiribati, Solomon Islands, Tonga, Vanuatu, Dominican Republic, Mexico, Galapagos Islands, Puerto Rico, Bangladesh, New Guinea, India, Thailand, Sri Lanka, Vietnam, Afghanistan, China, Israel, Japan, Republic of Korea.
