= Supertramp (ecology) =

Animal with high dispersion among many different habitats

In ecology, a supertramp species is any type of animal which follows the "supertramp" strategy of high dispersion among many different habitats, towards none of which it is particularly specialized. Supertramp species are typically the first to arrive in newly available habitats, such as volcanic islands and freshly deforested land; they can have profoundly negative effects on more highly specialized flora and fauna, both directly through predation and indirectly through competition for resources.

The name was coined by Jared Diamond in 1974, as an allusion to both the itinerant lifestyle of the tramp, and the then-popular band Supertramp. Although Diamond originally applied the term only to birds, the term has since been applied to insects and reptiles as well, among others; any species which can migrate can be a supertramp. In an evolutionary context, the supertramp may represent the first stage of the taxon cycle.

== See also ==
- Tramp species
- Assembly rules
