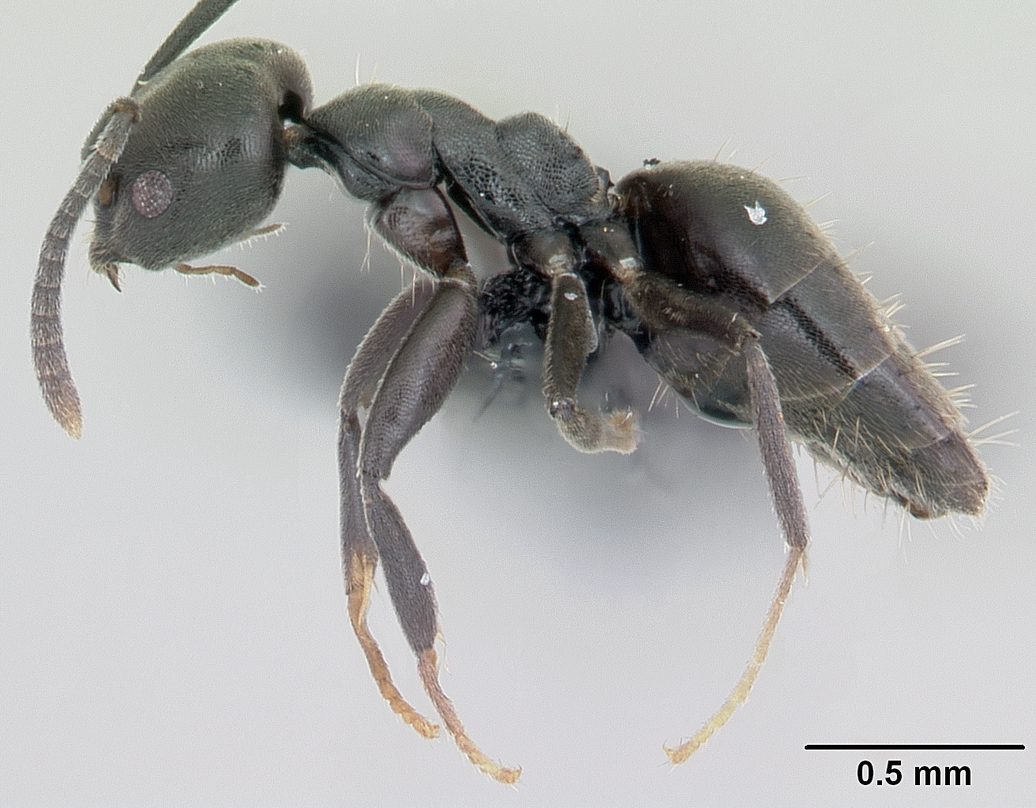
- T. albipes worker from Mauritius

Scientific classification
- Kingdom: Animalia
- Phylum: Arthropoda
- Class: Insecta
- Order: Hymenoptera
- Family: Formicidae
- Subfamily: Dolichoderinae
- Tribe: Tapinomini
- Genus: Technomyrmex; Mayr, 1872

Type species
- Technomyrmex strenuus Mayr, 1872

Diversity
- 98 species

Synonyms
- Aphantolepis Wheeler, 1930; Engramma Forel, 1905; Tapinoptera Santschi, 1925

= Technomyrmex =

Technomyrmex Temporal range: Late oligocene? - Recent

Genus of ants

Technomyrmex is a genus of ants in the subfamily Dolichoderinae. With 98 species, it is one of the largest and most diverse ant genera in the Dolichoderinae. The genus distributed throughout the tropical and subtropical zones with most species occurring in the Oriental-Malesian and Afrotropical regions. One species, Technomyrmex albipes is a tramp ant now widespread throughout the tropics due to human activities.

== Species ==
- Technomyrmex albicoxis Donisthorpe, 1945
- Technomyrmex albipes (Smith, 1861)
- Technomyrmex andrei Emery, 1899
- Technomyrmex antennus Zhou, 2001
- Technomyrmex anterops Bolton, 2007
- Technomyrmex antonii Forel, 1902
- Technomyrmex arnoldinus Forel, 1913
- Technomyrmex australops Bolton, 2007
- Technomyrmex bicolor Emery, 1893
- Technomyrmex briani Sharaf, 2009
- Technomyrmex brunneus Forel, 1895
- Technomyrmex butteli Forel, 1913
- Technomyrmex camerunensis Emery, 1899
- †Technomyrmex caritatis Brandão, Baroni Urbani, Wagensberg & Yamamoto, 1999
- Technomyrmex cedarensis Forel, 1915
- Technomyrmex certus Bolton, 2007
- Technomyrmex cheesmanae Donisthorpe, 1945
- Technomyrmex convexifrons Karavaiev, 1926
- Technomyrmex curiosus Bolton, 2007
- †Technomyrmex deletus Emery, 1891
- Technomyrmex detorquens (Walker, 1859)
- Technomyrmex difficilis Forel, 1892
- Technomyrmex docens Bolton, 2007
- Technomyrmex dubius Bolton, 2007
- Technomyrmex elatior Forel, 1902
- Technomyrmex fisheri Bolton, 2007
- Technomyrmex fornax Bolton, 2007
- Technomyrmex fulvus (Wheeler, 1934)
- Technomyrmex furens Bolton, 2007
- Technomyrmex gaudens Bolton, 2007
- Technomyrmex gibbosus Wheeler, 1906
- Technomyrmex gilvus Donisthorpe, 1941
- Technomyrmex gorgona Fernández & Guerrero, 2008
- Technomyrmex grandis Emery, 1887
- Technomyrmex hades Bolton, 2007
- †Technomyrmex hispaniolae (Wilson, 1985)
- Technomyrmex horni Forel, 1912
- Technomyrmex horrens Bolton, 2007
- Technomyrmex hostilis Bolton, 2007
- Technomyrmex ilgi (Forel, 1910)
- Technomyrmex impressus Bolton, 2007
- Technomyrmex indicus Bolton, 2007
- Technomyrmex innocens Bolton, 2007
- Technomyrmex jocosus Forel, 1910
- Technomyrmex kraepelini Forel, 1905
- Technomyrmex lasiops Bolton, 2007
- Technomyrmex laurenti (Emery, 1899)
- Technomyrmex lisae Forel, 1913
- Technomyrmex lujae (Forel, 1905)
- Technomyrmex madecassus Forel, 1897
- Technomyrmex mandibularis Bolton, 2007
- Technomyrmex mayri Forel, 1891
- Technomyrmex menozzii (Donisthorpe, 1936)
- Technomyrmex metandrei Bolton, 2007
- Technomyrmex mixtus Bolton, 2007
- Technomyrmex modiglianii Emery, 1900
- Technomyrmex moerens Santschi, 1913
- Technomyrmex montaseri Sharaf, Collingwood & Aldawood, 2011
- Technomyrmex myops Bolton, 2007
- Technomyrmex nigriventris Forel, 1910
- Technomyrmex nitens Bolton, 2007
- Technomyrmex obscurior Wheeler, 1928
- Technomyrmex pallipes (Smith, 1876)
- Technomyrmex parandrei Bolton, 2007
- Technomyrmex parviflavus Bolton, 2007
- Technomyrmex pilipes Emery, 1899
- Technomyrmex pluto Bolton, 2007
- Technomyrmex pratensis (Smith, 1860)
- Technomyrmex prevaricus Bolton, 2007
- Technomyrmex quadricolor (Wheeler, 1930)
- Technomyrmex rector Bolton, 2007
- Technomyrmex reductus Bolton, 2007
- Technomyrmex rotundiceps Karavaiev, 1926
- Technomyrmex rusticus Santschi, 1930
- Technomyrmex schimmeri Viehmeyer, 1916
- Technomyrmex schoedli Bolton, 2007
- Technomyrmex schoutedeni Forel, 1910
- Technomyrmex semiruber Emery, 1899
- Technomyrmex senex Bolton, 2007
- †Technomyrmex septentrionalis Zhang, 1989
- Technomyrmex setosus Collingwood, 1985
- Technomyrmex shattucki Bolton, 2007
- Technomyrmex sophiae Forel, 1902
- Technomyrmex strenuus Mayr, 1872
- Technomyrmex subgracilis Bolton, 2007
- Technomyrmex sundaicus (Emery, 1900)
- Technomyrmex sycorax Bolton, 2007
- Technomyrmex tatius Bolton, 2007
- Technomyrmex taylori (Santschi, 1930)
- Technomyrmex textor Forel, 1909
- Technomyrmex tonsuratus Bolton, 2007
- Technomyrmex vapidus Bolton, 2007
- Technomyrmex vexatus (Santschi, 1919)
- Technomyrmex vitiensis Mann, 1921
- Technomyrmex voeltzkowi (Forel, 1907)
- Technomyrmex wheeleri (Emery, 1913)
- Technomyrmex yamanei Bolton, 2007
- Technomyrmex zimmeri (Forel, 1911)
