= Thuriostoma =

Scientific classification
- Kingdom: Animalia
- Phylum: Arthropoda
- Clade: Pancrustacea
- Class: Insecta
- Order: Lepidoptera
- Family: Tineidae
- Genus: Thuriostoma

Genus of moths

Thuriostoma are a genus of moths belonging to the family Tineidae.

It contains only one species: Thuriostoma homalospora Meyrick, 1934 that is known from Samoa.
