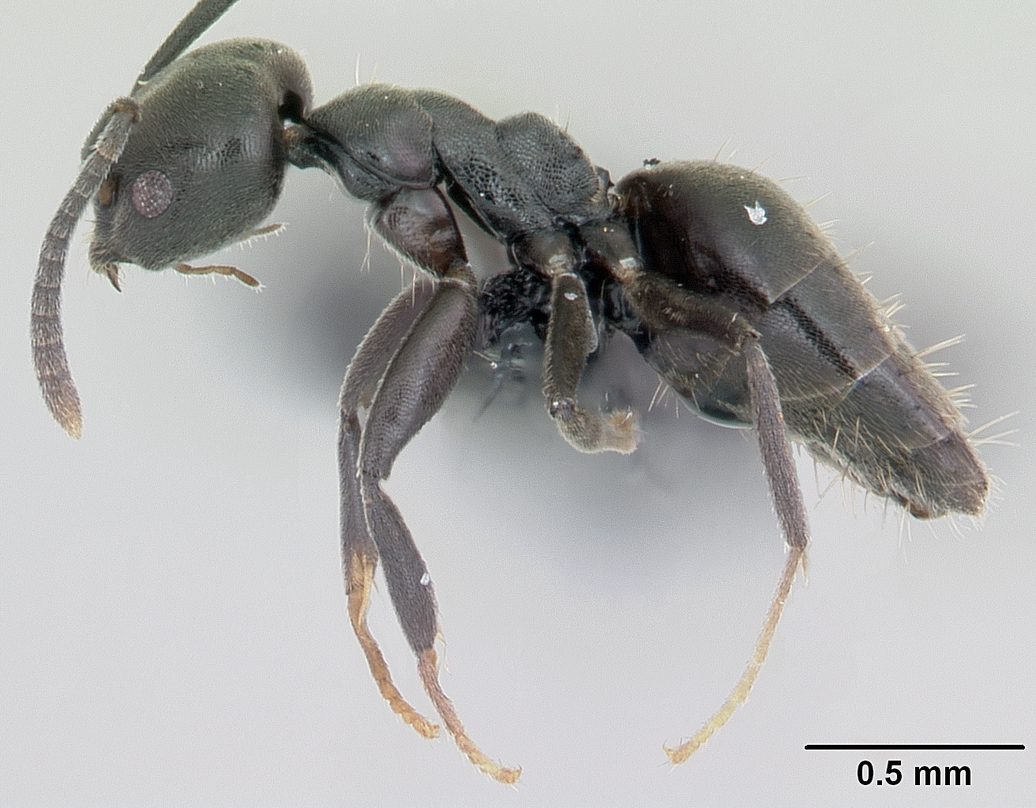
- Worker

Scientific classification
- Kingdom: Animalia
- Phylum: Arthropoda
- Class: Insecta
- Order: Hymenoptera
- Family: Formicidae
- Subfamily: Dolichoderinae
- Genus: Technomyrmex
- Species: T. albipes

Binomial name
- Technomyrmex albipes Smith, 1861

Synonyms
- Formica albipes Smith; Tapinoma albipes (Smith); Tapinoma albitarse Motschoulsky; Tapinoma nigrum Mayr; Technomyrmex detorquens Walker

= Technomyrmex albipes =

Species of ant

Technomyrmex albipes, commonly known as the white-footed ant, is a species of ant first described in 1861 from Sulawesi, Indonesia by the British entomologist Frederick Smith. Invasive pest ants in Florida, previously identified as T. albipes, have now been separated as Technomyrmex difficilis, both forming part of a species complex with a worldwide distribution.

== Description ==
T. albipes is a small black ant some 2 to 4 mm (0.08 to 0.16 in) long with the lower part of the limbs pale. Workers are chocolate-black with pale lower limbs, antennae with twelve segments and a flattened petiolar node. It differs from T. difficilis in lacking the pair of setae (bristles) that that species has on the back of its head.

== Distribution and habitat ==
The white-footed ant is native to the Indo-Pacific area, and has been introduced into Australia, Africa, North America, the Caribbean and parts of Asia. It inhabits dry forests and open locations. Tent-like nests are made out of debris in trees, bushes, rotten logs, under rocks, in leaf litter and similar places. It also nests in man-made structures such as wall cavities and attics.

== Colony ==
The colony structure of this ant is unusual; there are both winged and wingless males, and three types of female, queens, intercastes and workers. New colonies are founded when winged males copulate with winged females after a nuptial flight. These females then shed their wings, find a suitable nesting site and start laying eggs, but their function in the colony is later taken over by intercastes. These females differ from workers in having spermathecae (sperm storage organs) and are mated by wingless males inside the colony. They are responsible for most of the reproduction that takes place in the colony. The queen is larger than other members of the colony and lays both fertilised and unfertilised eggs throughout her life, but the colony continues in existence after she dies. So successful is this reproductive strategy that colonies grow to very large sizes, sometimes containing millions of individuals, and may occupy multiple nest sites.

== Ecology ==
The white-footed ant forages widely, entering dwellings and scavenging in kitchens and other rooms where it is considered a pest. It is largely arboreal and feeds on the honeydew of sap-sucking insects such as aphids, mealybugs, and scale insects. For this purpose it protects the insects and drives off predators, thereby encouraging the insects which may be agricultural pest species; the mealybug Dysmicoccus brevipes for example transmits pineapple wilt disease in Sri Lanka, and biological control of the mealybug has proved difficult because of the activities of the ant. Similarly in South Africa, the ant has encouraged outbreaks of the red scale insect (Aonidiella aurantii), a major pest of citrus in the country.
