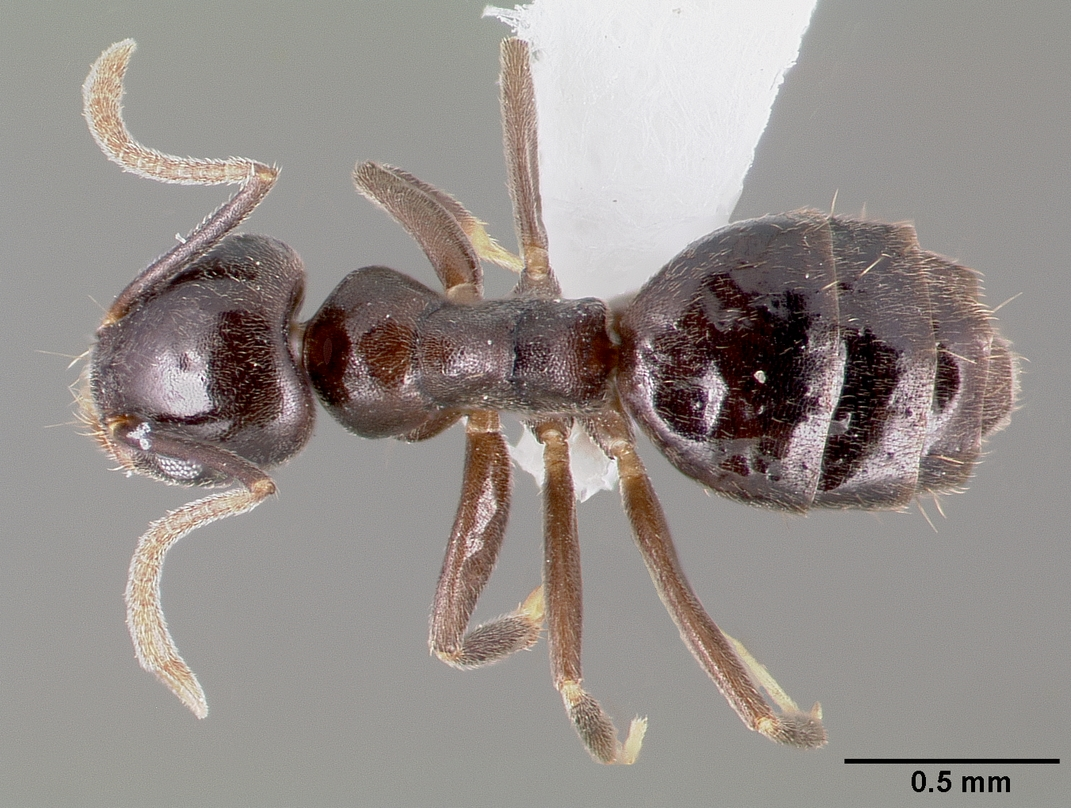

Scientific classification
- Domain: Eukaryota
- Kingdom: Animalia
- Phylum: Arthropoda
- Class: Insecta
- Order: Hymenoptera
- Family: Formicidae
- Subfamily: Dolichoderinae
- Genus: Technomyrmex
- Species: T. difficilis

Binomial name
- Technomyrmex difficilis Forel, 1892

= Technomyrmex difficilis =

Species of ant

Technomyrmex difficilis, known generally as the white-footed ant or difficult techno ant, is a species of odorous ant in the family Formicidae.

Native to the Old World, adventive in North America since 1986.
