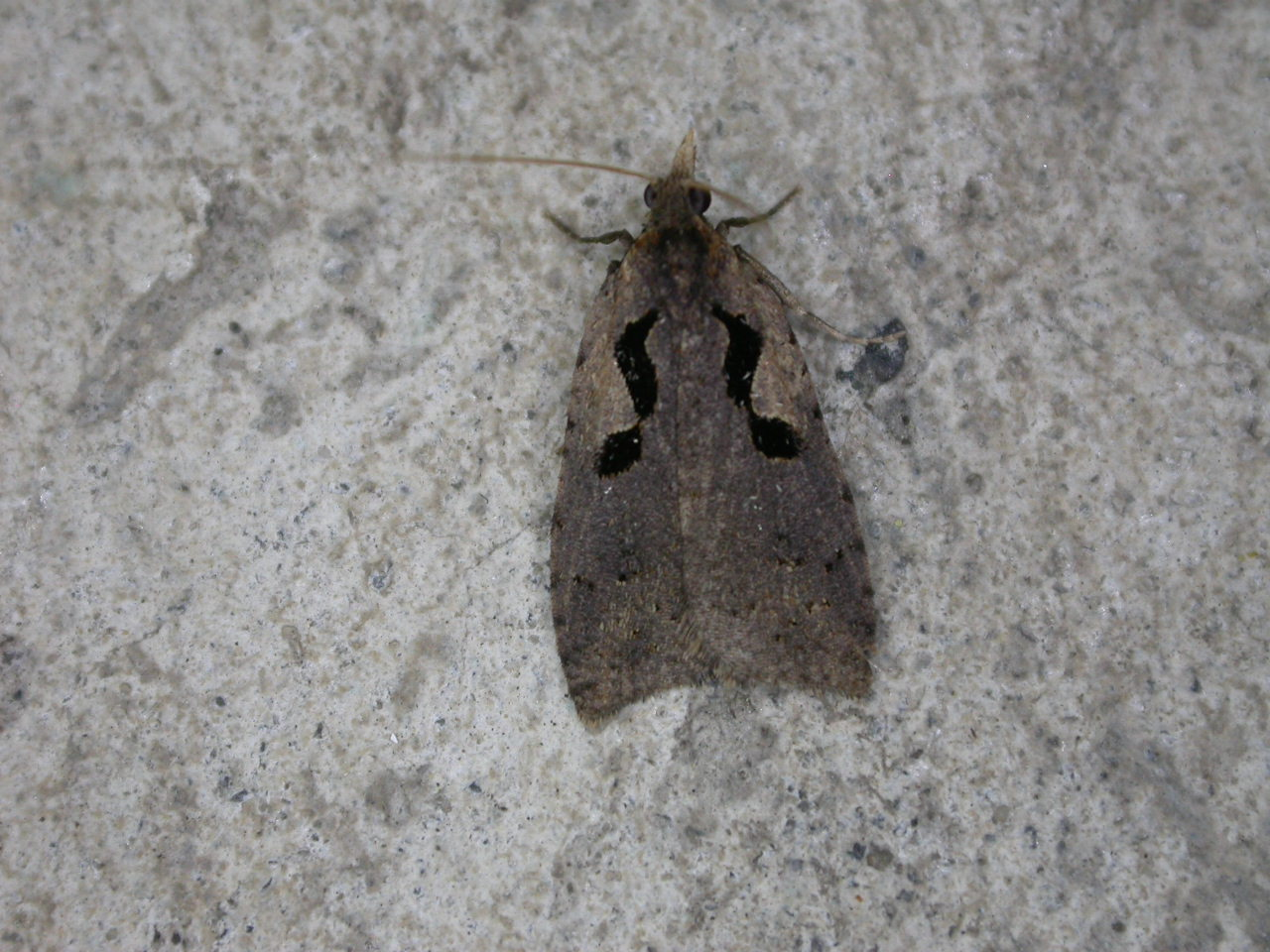

Scientific classification
- Kingdom: Animalia
- Phylum: Arthropoda
- Clade: Pancrustacea
- Class: Insecta
- Order: Lepidoptera
- Family: Tortricidae
- Subfamily: Tortricinae
- Tribe: Cnephasiini; Stainton, [1858]

Genera
- See text

Synonyms
- Sciaphilinae Guenee, 1845; Exapatidae Stainton, 1854; Tortricodidae Stainton, [1858]

= Cnephasiini =

Tribe of moths

The Cnephasiini are a tribe of tortrix moths.

== Genera ==
Amphicoecia
Archicnephasia
Arotrophora
Astrosa
Cnephasia
Decodes
Decodina
Doloploca
Drachmobola
Eana
Epicnephasia
Exapate
Hypostephanuncia
Immariana
Kawabea
Mictoneura
Neosphaleroptera
Oporopsamma
Oxypteron
Paranepsia
Propiromorpha
Protopterna
Pseudargyrotoza
Sphaleroptera – may belong in Cnephasia
Stenopteron
Taeniarchis
Tortricodes
Xerocnephasia

== Former genera ==
Anoplocnephasia
Brachycnephasia
Sciaphila
Synochoneura
