= Nicholas S. Obraztsov =

Russian-American entomologist (1906–1966)

Nicholas Sergeevich Obraztsov (18 August 1906 – 1966) was a Russian-American scholar, entomologist, and leading specialist of the tortricoid microlepidoptera.

== Early life and career ==
Obraztsov was born on 18 August 1906 in Rostov on the Don, Russia, to Dr. Sergei Nikolaevich Obraztsov and his wife, Ludmila Nikolaevna Obraztsova. From 1922 to 1934, he studied natural history, science, chemistry, and mathematics at the Institute for Pedagogy in Nikolaev. He furthermore obtained a PhD from the Ludwig-Maximilians-Universität München in 1951. After various positions at Kyiv University, the University of Königsberg and the Ludwig-Maximilians-Universität München, he immigrated to the US in 1951, where he became a research associate of the American Museum of Natural History in New York City and of the United States National Museum in Washington, D.C.

== Research ==
The subjects of his research were revisions of the family Ctenuchidae of the world and of the family Tortricidae, first of the Palaearctic, later of the Nearctic and Neotropical regions. By systematically indexing the lepidopterological literature Obraztsov created a catalog with more than 30,000 entries and became the recognized leading specialist in his field. The most significant results of his taxonomy were published in the journal Tijdschrift voor Entomologie in 1955. In addition, Obraztsov published more than 130 other scientific works from 1926 to 1966.

Numerous species of Tortricidae were first systematically categorized by Obraztsov, including Argyrotaenia urbana, Cochylidia contumescens, Choristoneura lambertiana, and Cochylidia oblonga.
