= Astrosa =

Scientific classification
- Kingdom: Animalia
- Phylum: Arthropoda
- Class: Insecta
- Order: Lepidoptera
- Family: Tortricidae
- Tribe: Cnephasiini
- Genus: Astrosa; Diakonoff, 1951
- Species: A. leucosema

Binomial name
- Astrosa leucosema Diakonoff, 1951

Monotypic genus of tortrix moths

Astrosa is a genus of moths belonging to the subfamily Tortricinae of the family Tortricidae. It contains only one species, Astrosa leucosema, which is found in Indonesia (Java).

== See also ==
- List of Tortricidae genera
