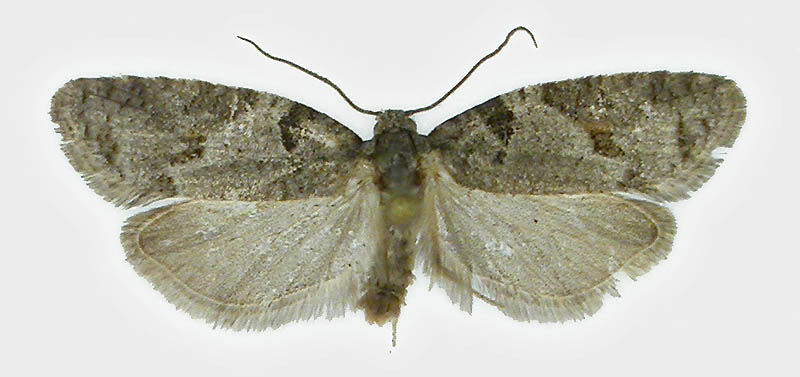
- Adult Eana incanana specimen

Scientific classification
- Kingdom: Animalia
- Phylum: Arthropoda
- Clade: Pancrustacea
- Class: Insecta
- Order: Lepidoptera
- Family: Tortricidae
- Genus: Eana; Billberg, 1820

Type species
- Tortrix penziana Thunberg & Becklin, 1791

Diversity
- 36 species

Synonyms
- Numerous, see text

= Eana =

Genus of tortrix moths

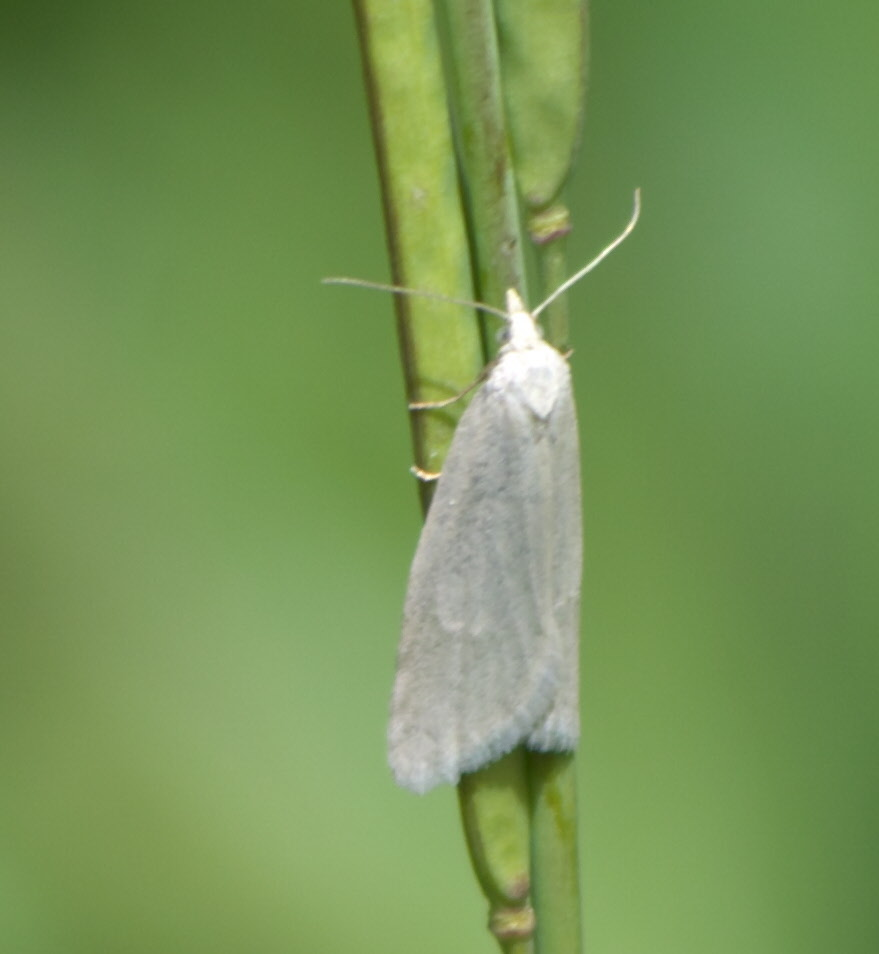
Eana

Eana is a genus of tortrix moths (family Tortricidae). It belongs to the tribe Cnephasiini of subfamily Tortricinae.

== Synonyms ==
Obsolete scientific names for this genus are:

- Ablabia Hübner, 1825
- Argyroptera Duponchel, 1834 (but see below)
- Eutrachia Hübner, 1822
- Nephodesma Stephens, 1834 (unjustified emendation)
- Nephodesme Hübner, 1825
- Subeana Obraztsov, 1963

The type species of Argyroptera (A. gouana) is not very well identifiable from its 1767 description (as Tortrix gouana) by Linnaeus. It was suspected to be a species of Aethes, but more probably is E. argentana. Hypostephanuncia is sometimes listed in the synonymy of Eana, but it is actually a junior synonym of Cnephasia (from which it was originally split).

== Species ==
The 36 currently recognized species of Eana are:

- Eana agricolana (Kennel, 1919)
- Eana andreana (Kennel, 1919)
- Eana antiphila (Meyrick, 1913)
- Eana argentana (Clerck, 1759) (syn: Eana hungariae Razowski, 1958)
- Eana biruptana (Oberthür, 1922)
- Eana canescana (Guenee, 1845)
- Eana caradjai (Razowski, 1965)
- Eana clercana (de Joannis, 1908)
- Eana cottiana (Chrétien, 1898)
- Eana cyanescana (Réal, 1953)
- Eana derivana (Laharpe, 1858)
- Eana dominicana (Kennel, 1919)
- Eana filipjevi (Réal, 1953)
- Eana freii (Weber, 1945)
- Eana georgiella (Hulst, 1887)
- Eana herzegovinae (Razowski, 1959)
- Eana idahoensis (Obraztsov, 1963)
- Eana incanana (Stephens, 1852)

- Eana incognitana (Razowski, 1959)
- Eana incompta (Razowski, 1971)
- Eana italica (Obraztsov, 1950)
- Eana jaeckhi (Razowski, 1959)
- Eana joannisi (Schawerda, 1929)
- Eana maroccana (Filipjev, 1935)
- Eana nervana (de Joannis, 1908)
- Eana nevadensis (Rebel, 1928)
- Eana osseana (Scopoli, 1763)
- Eana pallifrons (Razowski, 1958)
- Eana penziana (Thunberg & Becklin, 1791)
- Eana rundiapicana (Razowski, 1959)
- Eana samarcandae (Razowski, 1958)
- Eana schonmanni (Razowski, 1959)
- Eana similis (Razowski, 1965)
- Eana tibetana (Caradja, 1939)
- Eana vetulana (Christoph, 1881)
- Eana viardi (Réal, 1953)

== Appearance ==
They are small moths with wingspans varying by species, usually around 16mm to 28mm. Their forewings are chalk-white to pale grey and are narrow and rounded and occasionally have curved dark bands at the base. These features are also used for camouflage.
