= Synochoneura tapaishani =

Scientific classification
- Domain: Eukaryota
- Kingdom: Animalia
- Phylum: Arthropoda
- Class: Insecta
- Order: Lepidoptera
- Family: Tortricidae
- Genus: Synochoneura
- Species: S. tapaishani

Binomial name
- Synochoneura tapaishani (Caradja, 1939)

Synonyms
- Tortrix tapaishani Caradja, 1939

Species of moth

Synochoneura tapaishani is a species of moth of the family Tortricidae. It is found in Shanxi, China.
