= Synochoneura fansipangana =

Scientific classification
- Domain: Eukaryota
- Kingdom: Animalia
- Phylum: Arthropoda
- Class: Insecta
- Order: Lepidoptera
- Family: Tortricidae
- Genus: Synochoneura
- Species: S. fansipangana

Binomial name
- Synochoneura fansipangana Razowski, 2008

Species of moth

Synochoneura fansipangana is a moth of the family Tortricidae. It is found in Vietnam.
