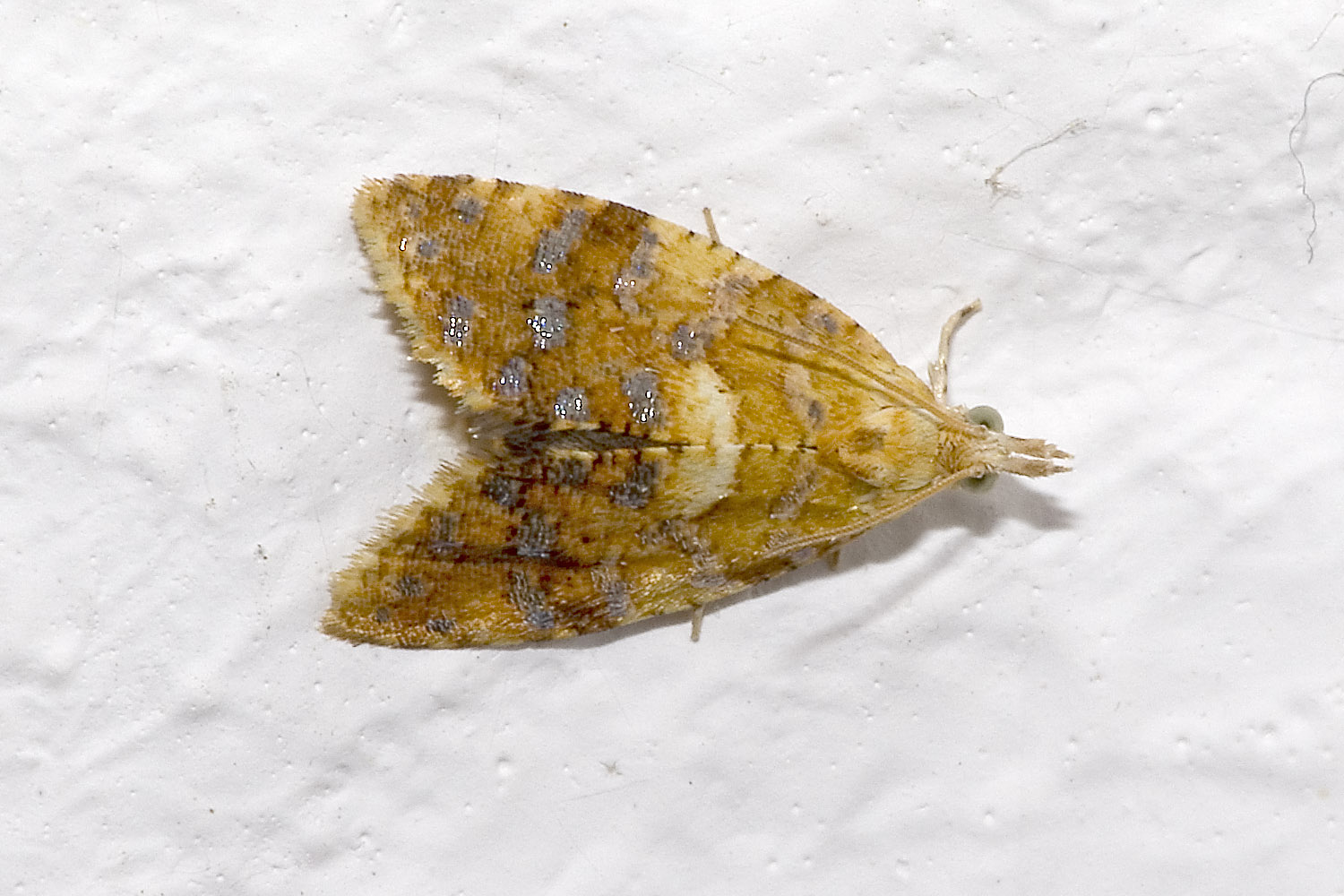

Scientific classification
- Kingdom: Animalia
- Phylum: Arthropoda
- Clade: Pancrustacea
- Class: Insecta
- Order: Lepidoptera
- Family: Tortricidae
- Genus: Pseudargyrotoza
- Species: P. conwagana

Binomial name
- Pseudargyrotoza conwagana (Fabricius, 1775)

Synonyms
- List: Pyralis conwagana Fabricius, 1775; Tortrix aeratana Kennel, 1910; Phalaena (Tortrix) conwayana Gmelin, 1788; Argyrotoxa deficiens Dufrane, 1960; Tortrix erebina Schawerda, 1916; Cochylis hoffmannseggana Treitschke, 1830; Agapeta hoffmanseggana Hubner, 1822; Tortrix hoffmanseggiana Haworth, [1811]; Tortrix hofmanseggana Hubner, [1796-1799]; Phalaena montana Scopoli, 1763; Tortrix spixiana Frolich, 1828; Argyrotoza subaurantiana Stephens, 1829; Commophila subaurantiana Stephens, 1834

= Pseudargyrotoza conwagana =

Species of moth

Pseudargyrotoza conwagana is a moth of the family Tortricidae found in Asia and Europe. It was first described by the Danish entomologists, Johan Christian Fabricius in 1775.

== Description ==
The wingspan is 11–15 mm. The thorax is crested. The forewings are triangular, yellow, more or less suffused with orange or ferruginous and faintly darker-strigulated. The basal patch is often darker and always followed by a pale yellow dorsal mark. The central and terminal fasciae are often darker or blackish-mixed, edged with leaden-metallic dots. The hindwings are blackish - grey, lighter anteriorly. The larva yellow-whitish; dorsal line darker; head yellow-brownish.

Adults are on wing from May to July.

The larvae feed on ash (Fraxinus excelsior), Manchurian ash (Fraxinus mandshurica), privet (Ligustrum species) (including broad-leaf privet (Ligustrum lucidum)) and barberry (Berberis species).

== Distribution ==
It is found in Europe, China (Heilongjiang, Jilin, Shaanxi, Sichuan, Beijing, Shandong), South Korea, Japan, Russia (Siberia, Ussuri) and Asia Minor.

== Taxonomy ==
Fabricius originally called the moth Pyralis conwagana from a specimen found in Oxford, England. Pyralis refers to an unknown bird or winged insect which supposedly lived in fire and may refer to how some pyralid moths are attracted to light. The genus was raised by the Swedish biologist Carl Linnaeus, who formalised binomial nomenclature – the modern system of naming organisms. Pyralis was one of seven families in which Linnaeus placed all of the moths (apart from the hawk moths). Pseudargyrotoza was raised by Nicholas Sergeyevitch Obraztsov in 1954 and refers to; Pseudos – a falsehood; argyrotoza which comes from a synonym of Croesia i.e. argurotoxos – bearer of the silver bow. The bearer being Apollo. If this moth is observed with a raking light, tiny silver scales can be seen on the forewings. The specific name conwagana is named in honour of the 18th-century, British entomologist Conway, who Fabricius described as ″an indefatigable companion″ when collecting specimens around London.
