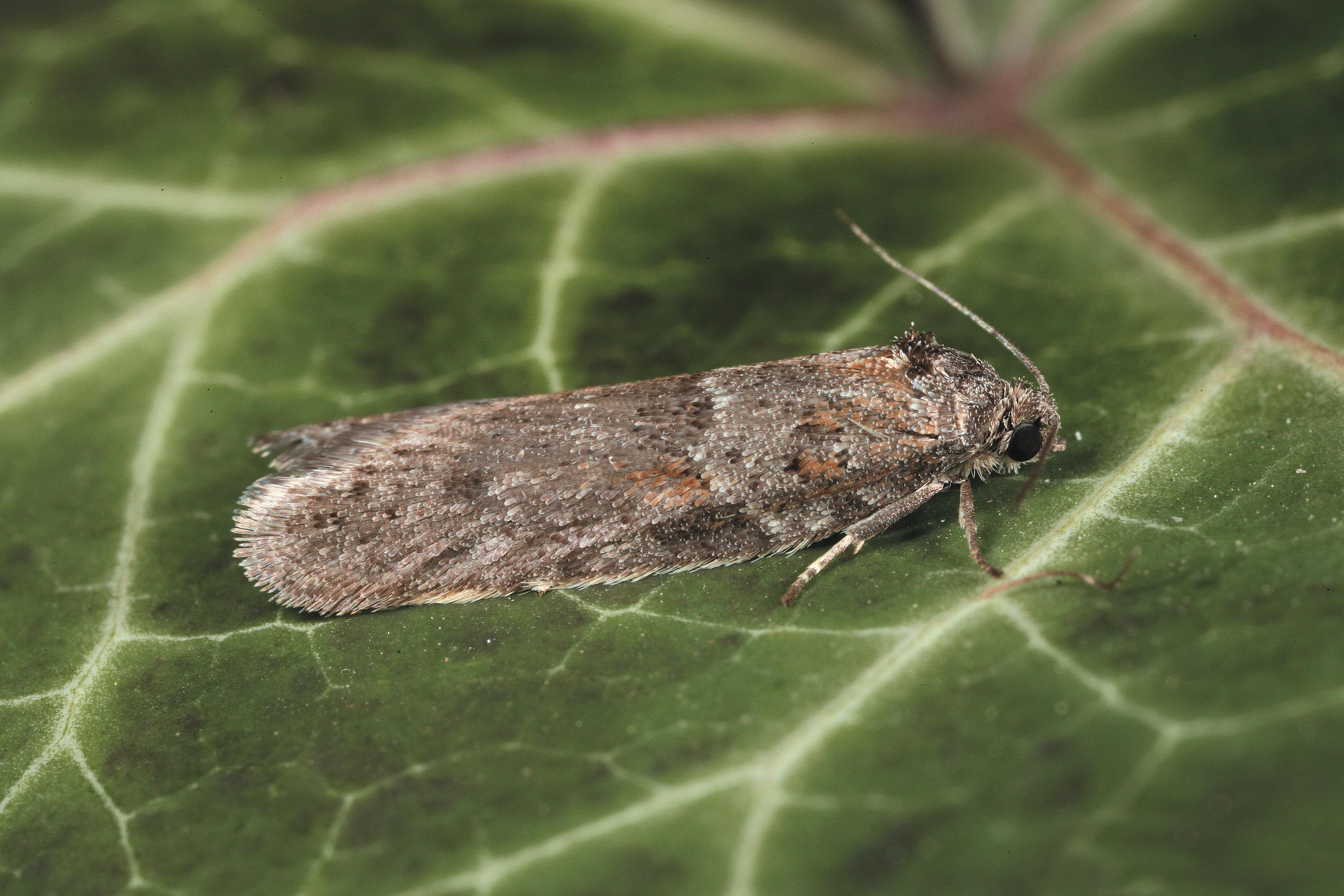
- Tortricodes alternella

Scientific classification
- Kingdom: Animalia
- Phylum: Arthropoda
- Class: Insecta
- Order: Lepidoptera
- Family: Tortricidae
- Tribe: Cnephasiini
- Genus: Tortricodes; Guenée, 1845

Synonyms
- Cheimatophila Herrich-Schaffer, 1851; Oporinia Hubner, 1816

= Tortricodes =

Genus of tortrix moths

Tortricodes is a genus of moths belonging to the family Tortricidae.

== Species ==
- Tortricodes alternella ([Denis & Schiffermuller], 1775)
- Tortricodes selma Kocak, 1991

== See also ==
- List of Tortricidae genera
