= Paranepsia =

Scientific classification
- Kingdom: Animalia
- Phylum: Arthropoda
- Class: Insecta
- Order: Lepidoptera
- Family: Tortricidae
- Tribe: Cnephasiini
- Genus: Paranepsia; Turner, 1916

Genus of tortrix moths

Paranepsia is a genus of moths belonging to the subfamily Tortricinae of the family Tortricidae.

== Species ==
- Paranepsia amydra Turner, 1916

== See also ==
- List of Tortricidae genera
