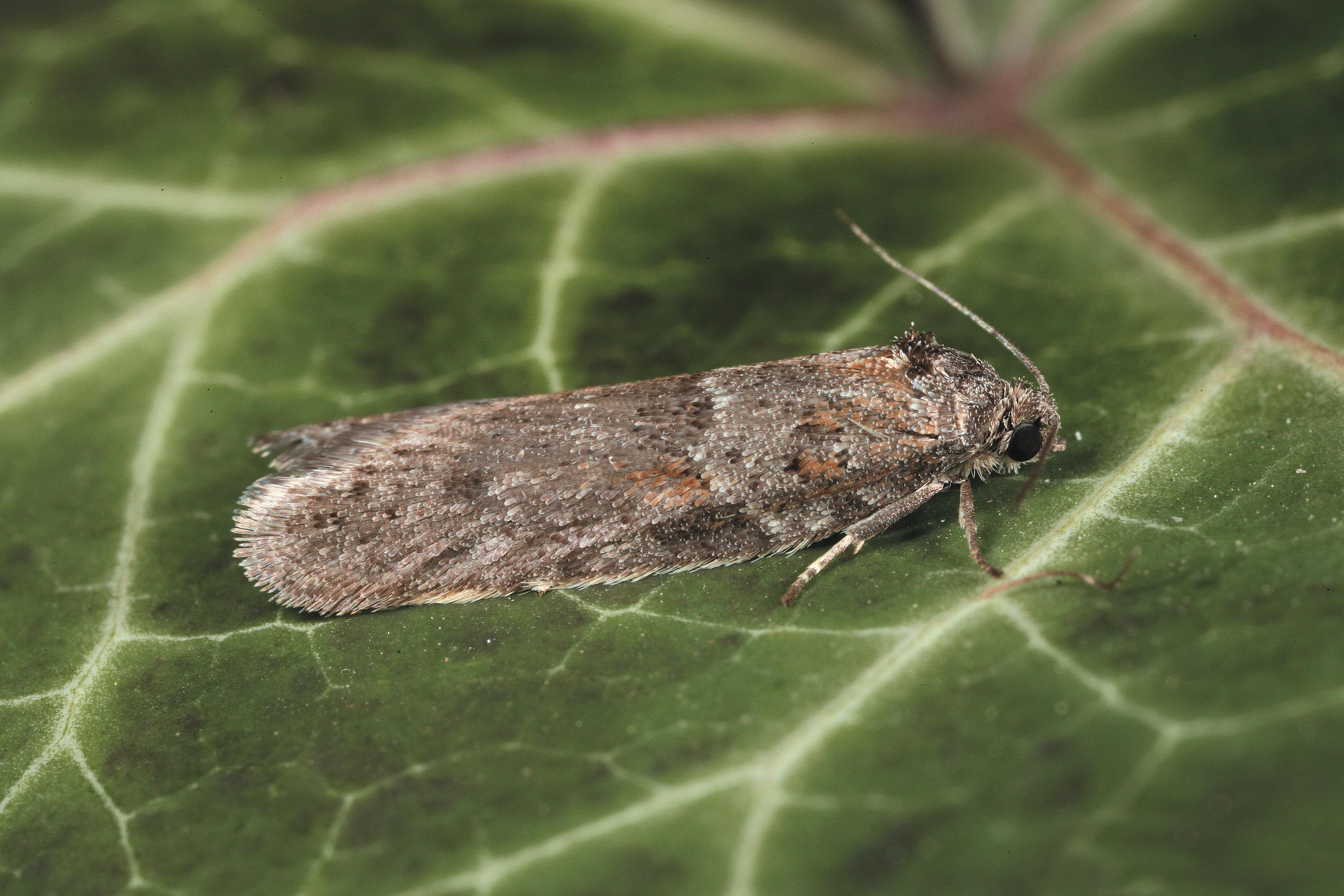

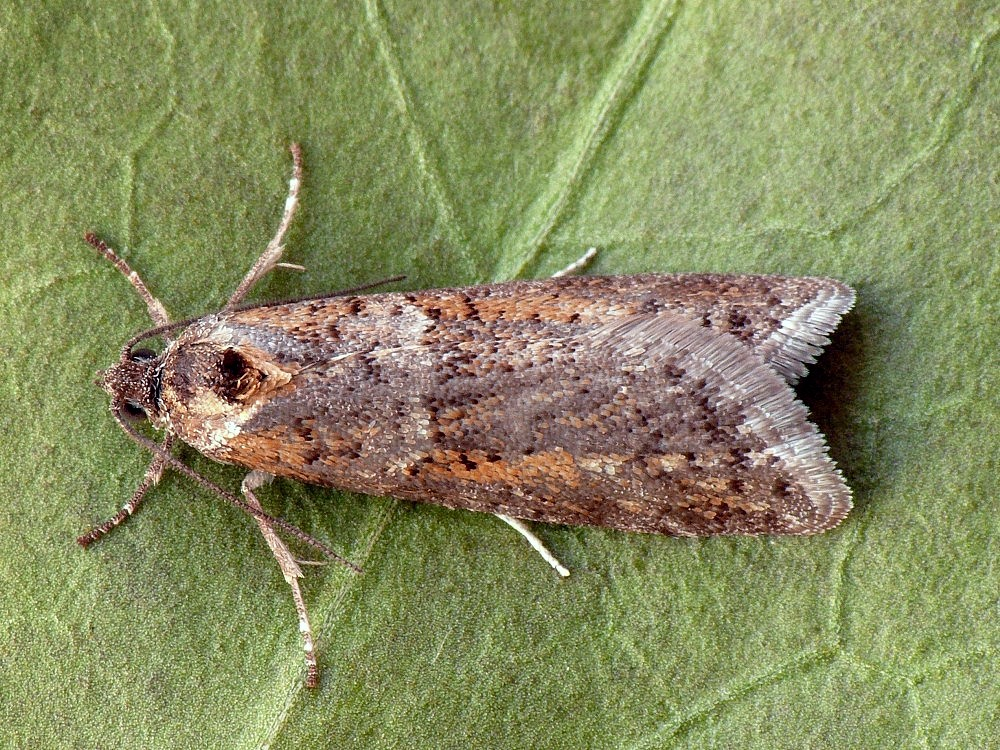

Scientific classification
- Domain: Eukaryota
- Kingdom: Animalia
- Phylum: Arthropoda
- Class: Insecta
- Order: Lepidoptera
- Family: Tortricidae
- Genus: Tortricodes
- Species: T. alternella

Binomial name
- Tortricodes alternella (Denis & Schiffermüller, 1775)

Synonyms
- Tinea alternella Denis & Schiffermüller, 1775; Tortrix alstroemeriana Werneburg, 1864; Sciaphila alternana Guenée, 1845; Tortrix hyemana Hübner, [1818-1819]; Lemmatophila hyemella Treitschke, 1835; Diurnea nubilea Haworth, [1811]; Diurnea tortricea Haworth, [1811]; Tinea tortricella Hübner, [1796-1799]; Tortricodes tortricella Hübner, 1796; Tortricodes violella Razowski, 1956; Tortricodes violellus

= Tortricodes alternella =

Species of moth

Tortricodes alternella is a species of moth of the family Tortricidae. It is found in most of Europe, except most of the Balkan Peninsula.

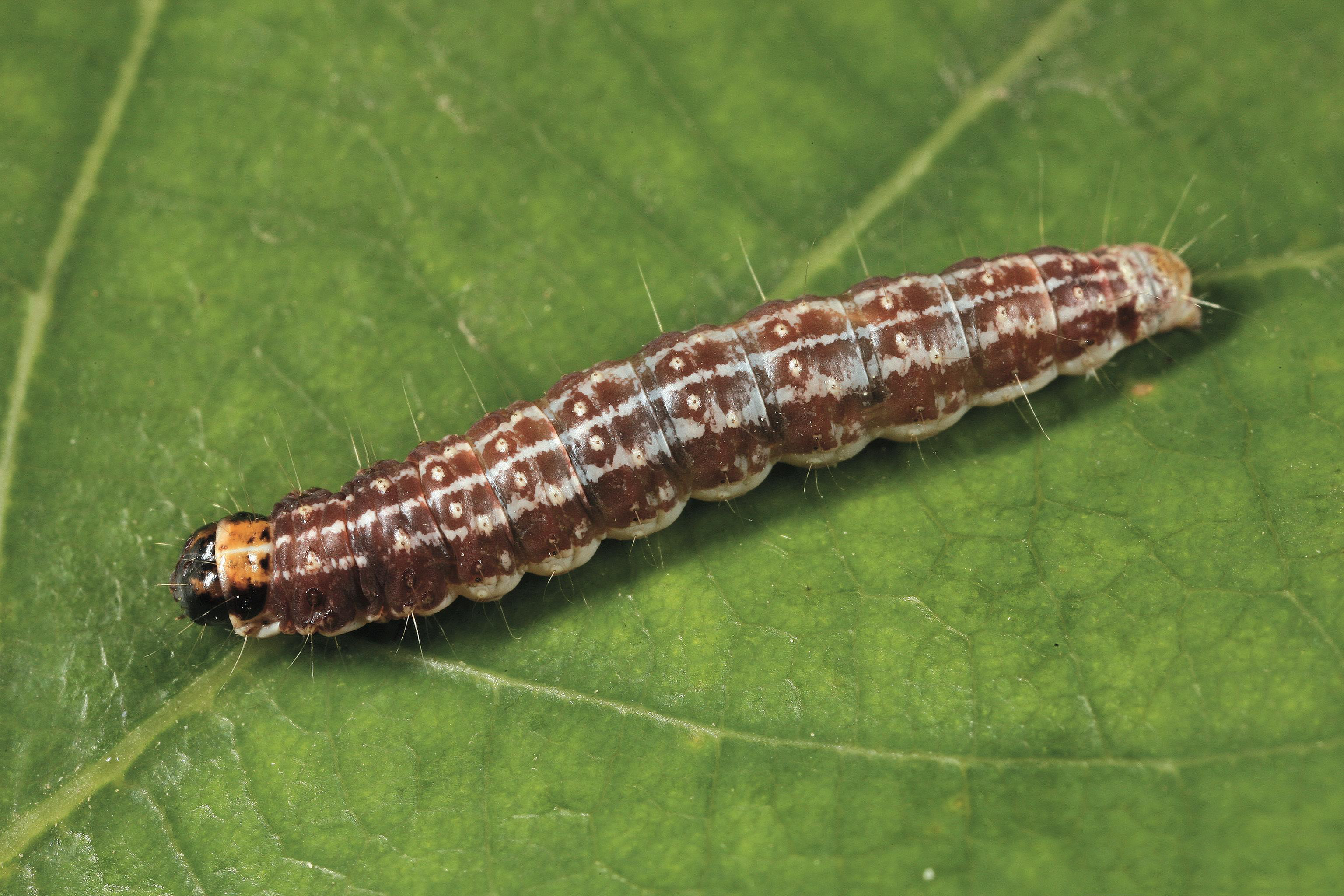
Larva

The wingspan is 19–23 mm. It slim moth, the forewings are quite narrow, grey or brown with a darker cross-band, occasionally the entire outer part is darker. The hindwings are pale brown with darker veins. It is similar to the male of Exapate congelatella, but flies in the spring, not in autumn.

Adults are on wing from February and April.

The larvae feed on various trees and bushes, including Quercus and Carpinus species. They spin together the leaves of their host plant and feed within.

== Taxonomy ==
Tortricodes violella is treated as a valid species by some authors.
