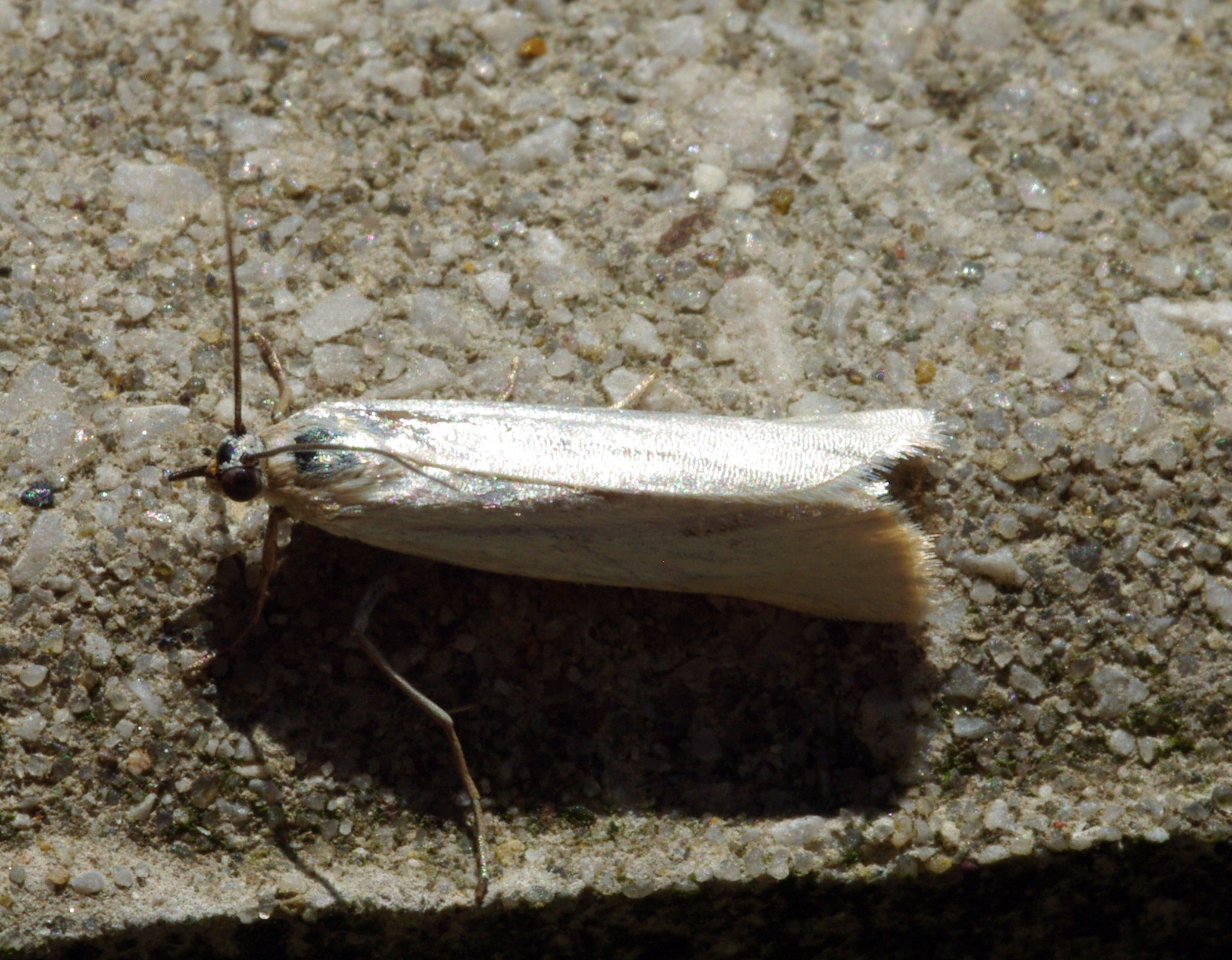

Scientific classification
- Kingdom: Animalia
- Phylum: Arthropoda
- Class: Insecta
- Order: Lepidoptera
- Family: Tortricidae
- Genus: Eana
- Species: E. argentana

Binomial name
- Eana argentana (Clerck, 1759)

Synonyms
- Phalaena argentana Clerck, 1759; Cnephasia colossa Caradja, 1916; Phalaena (Tortrix) goiiana Linnaeus, 1761; Phalaena (Tortrix) gouana Linnaeus, 1767; Pyralis govana Fabricius, 1775; Eana hungariae Razowski, 1958; Tortrix magnana Hubner, [1811-1813]; Pyralis margaritalis Hubner, 1796; Eana plumbeana Kennel, 1910

= Eana argentana =

Species of moth

Eana argentana is a moth of the family Tortricidae. It is found in Great Britain, Spain, France, Luxembourg, Belgium, the Netherlands, Germany, Austria, Switzerland, Italy, the Czech Republic, Slovakia, Poland, Albania, Bosnia and Herzegovina, Slovenia, Hungary, Bulgaria, Romania, North Macedonia, Greece, Norway, Sweden, Finland, the Baltic region and Russia. It is also present in western North America, where it has been recorded from Alaska, Alberta, Arizona, British Columbia, California, Maine, Montana, New Mexico, Washington and Wyoming. The habitat consists of high-elevation open habitats.

The wingspan is 20–26 mm. Adults have uniform whitish forewings. The hindwings are light grey. Adults are on wing from July to August.

The larvae feed on Gramineae species.
