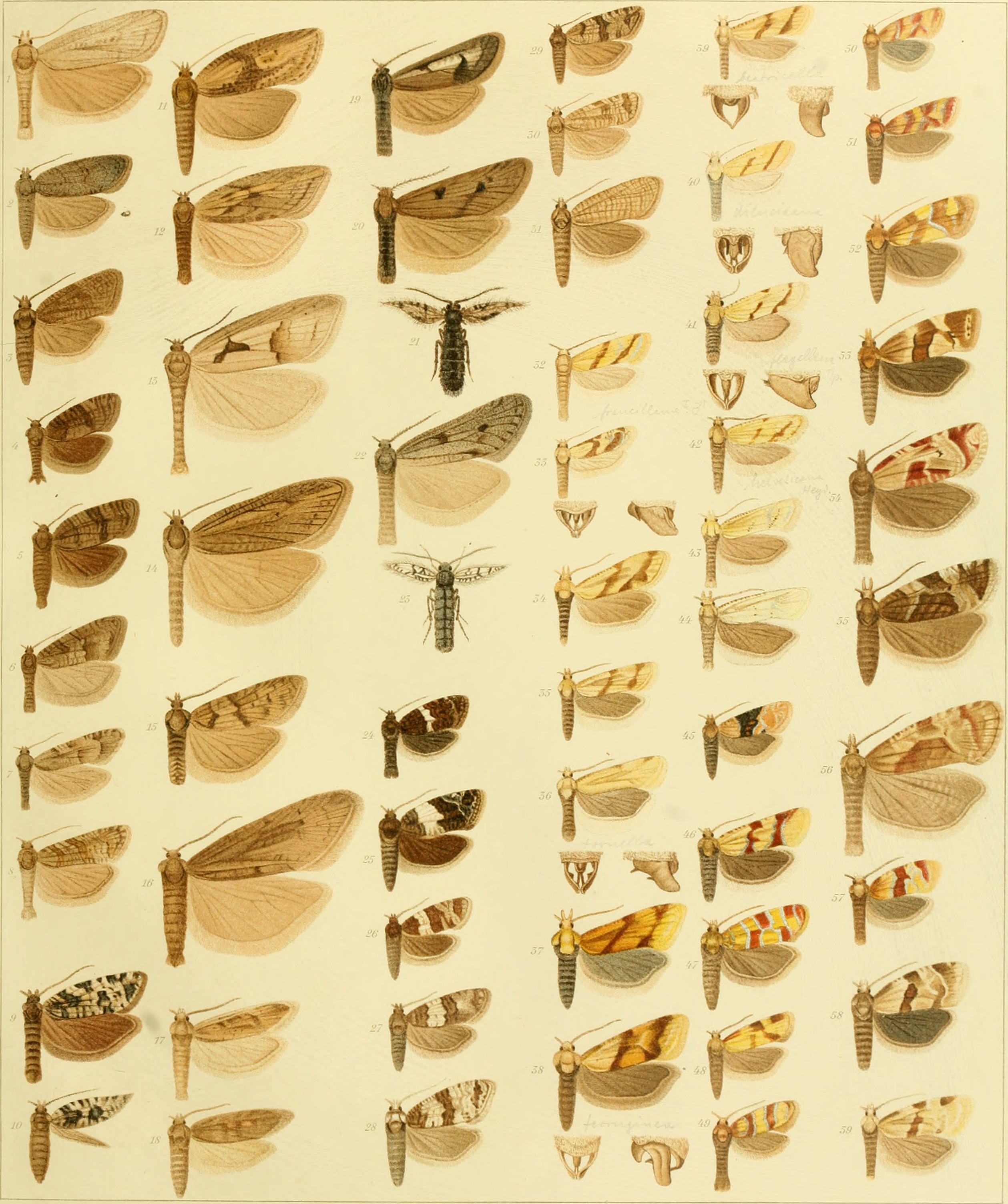
- Kawabeia ignavana (Christoph, 1881) in Die palaearktischen tortriciden (figure 16)

Scientific classification
- Kingdom: Animalia
- Phylum: Arthropoda
- Class: Insecta
- Order: Lepidoptera
- Family: Tortricidae
- Subfamily: Tortricinae
- Genus: Kawabeia; Obraztsov, 1965

= Kawabeia =

Genus of tortricid moths

Kawabeia is an East Palearctic genus of moths belonging to the subfamily Tortricinae of the family Tortricidae. The name was published by Nicholas Sergeyevitch Obraztsov on April 16, 1965, in Tijdschrift voor entomologie. The genus was named after Atsushi Kawabe, a Japanese lepidopterologist. Obraztsov assigned Cheimatophila ignavana Christoph, 1881 as the type of the genus. On June 30 of the same year, Józef Razowski published the name Kawabea, with the same type, in Acta zoologica cracoviensia. As Kawabeia antedates Kawabea by two months, the latter name is a junior objective synonym of the first one.

== Species ==
- Kawabeia fuscofasciata Park & Byun, 1991 Korea (Gwanglung)
- Kawabeia ignavana (Christoph, 1881) East Siberia
- Kawabeia nigricolor Yasuda & Kawabe, 1980 Japan
- Kawabeia paraignavana Park & Byun, 1991 Korea (Gwanglung)
- Kawabeia razowskii (Kawabe, 1963 ) Japan

== See also ==
- List of Tortricidae genera
