= Synochoneura sapana =

Scientific classification
- Domain: Eukaryota
- Kingdom: Animalia
- Phylum: Arthropoda
- Class: Insecta
- Order: Lepidoptera
- Family: Tortricidae
- Genus: Synochoneura
- Species: S. sapana

Binomial name
- Synochoneura sapana Razowski, 2008

Species of moth

Synochoneura sapana is a moth of the family Tortricidae. It is found in Vietnam.

The wingspan is 19 mm.
