= Doloploca supina =

Scientific classification
- Kingdom: Animalia
- Phylum: Arthropoda
- Class: Insecta
- Order: Lepidoptera
- Family: Tortricidae
- Genus: Doloploca
- Species: D. supina

Binomial name
- Doloploca supina Razowski, 1975

Species of moth

Doloploca supina is a species of moth of the family Tortricidae. It is found in China (Jiangsu).

The wingspan is about 22 mm.
