= Synochoneura ochriclivis =

Scientific classification
- Kingdom: Animalia
- Phylum: Arthropoda
- Class: Insecta
- Order: Lepidoptera
- Family: Tortricidae
- Genus: Synochoneura
- Species: S. ochriclivis

Binomial name
- Synochoneura ochriclivis (Meyrick, in Caradja, 1931)

Synonyms
- Eulia ochriclivis Meyrick, in Caradja, 1931; Synochoneura ochrichivis Razowski, 1987

Species of moth

Synochoneura ochriclivis is a species of moth of the family Tortricidae. It is found in Zhejiang, China.
