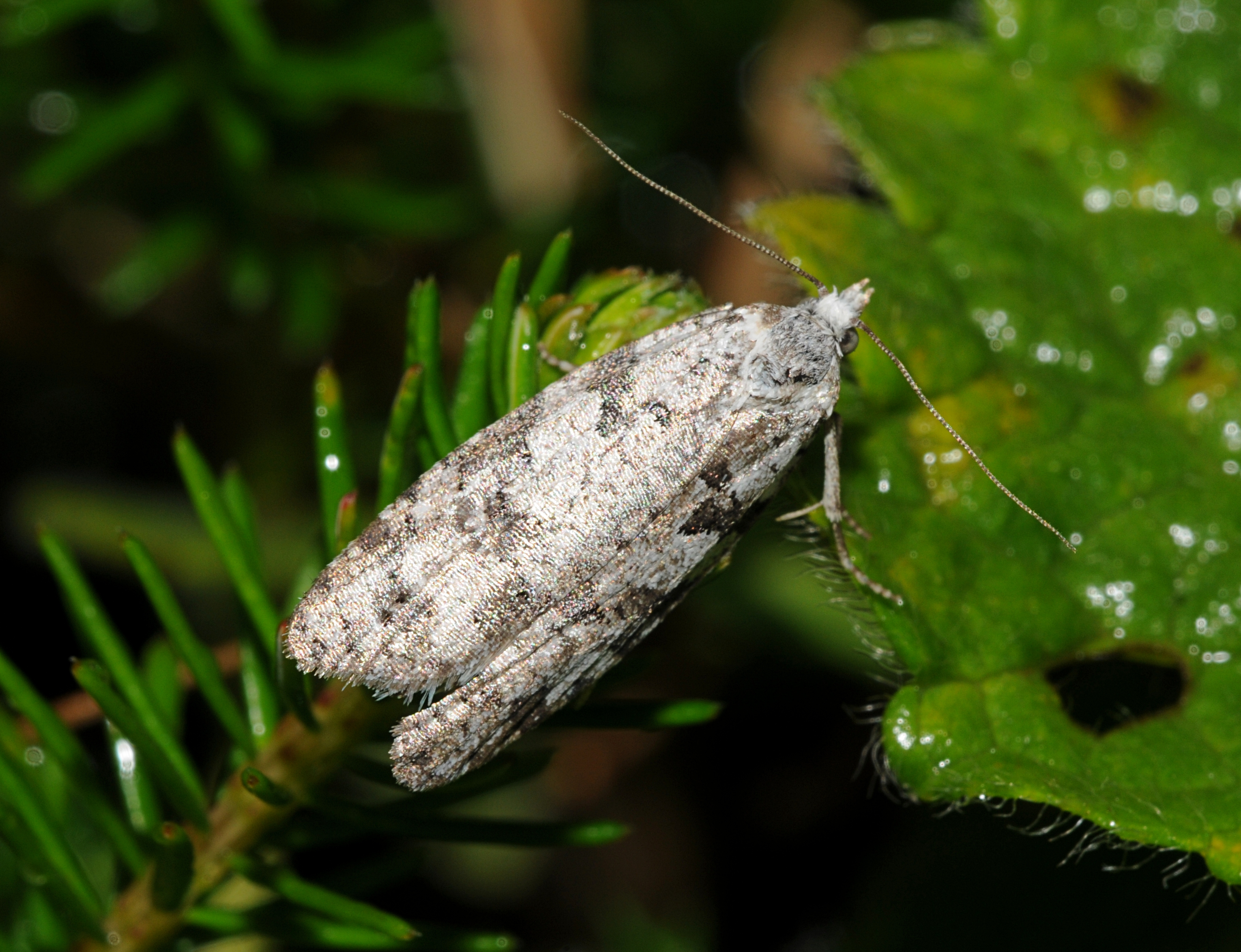

Scientific classification
- Kingdom: Animalia
- Phylum: Arthropoda
- Class: Insecta
- Order: Lepidoptera
- Family: Tortricidae
- Genus: Eana
- Species: E. penziana

Binomial name
- Eana penziana (Thunberg & Becklin, 1791)

Synonyms
- Tortrix penziana Thunberg & Becklin, 1791; Eana penzeana (misspelling); Cnephasia (Nephodesme) penziana race alpestris Ral, 1953; Eana penziana f. amseli Razowski, 1959; Cnephasia bellana Curtis, 1826; Sciaphila penziana colquhounana Doubleday, 1850; Cnephasia colquhounana Barret, 1884; Nephodesme conspersana Hubner, [1825] 1816; Sciaphila diurneana Guenee, 1845; Eana penziana fiorana Razowski, 1959; Cnephasia (Nephodesme) penziana form ind. livonica Ral, 1953; Cnephasia pentziana Schawerda, 1929; Eana viridescens Razowski, 1959

= Eana penziana =

Species of moth

Eana penziana, or Pentz's tortrix, is a moth of the family Tortricidae. It is found in most of Europe, east to the eastern part of the Palearctic realm. It is also found in the Near East.

The wingspan is 18–25 mm for males and 24–28 mm for females. The wingspan is 21–27 mm. The ground colour of the forewings varies from silvery white to light brown, with grey or black markings. Although the species is quite variable in colour, it is usually easy to recognize the size and colour pattern. The hindwings are light grey and defined. Subspecies bellana Curtis, 1826 is described - Antennal cilia in male very short. Thorax crested. Forewings very elongate, costa hardly arched, 7 to apex; white, indistinctly strigulated with black; an angulated fascia at 1/3 sometimes not reaching dorsum, irregular central fascia sometimes interrupted near dorsum, small costal patch and irregular usually connected streak from termen fuscous much marked and suffused with black. Hindwings grey-whitish, greyer and faintly strigated posteriorly, 6 and 7 short-stalked. Subspecies colquhounana Doubleday, 1850 differs from ssp. bellana as follows : forewings slightly broader anteriorly, ground - colour grey, whitish - mixed, markings much less defined.

Adults of subspecies bellana are on wing from June to July. Adults of subspecies colquhounana are on wing in May and again in August and September in two generations.

The larvae of subspecies bellana feed on Festuca ovina and the larvae of colquhounana feed on Plantago maritima and Armeria maritima. Other foodplants include Sempervivum, Euphrasia, Saxifraga, Lotus and Festuca ovina.

== Subspecies ==
- Eana penziana penziana
- Eana penziana bellana
- Eana penziana colquhounana
