= Paranepsia amydra =

Scientific classification
- Kingdom: Animalia
- Phylum: Arthropoda
- Class: Insecta
- Order: Lepidoptera
- Family: Tortricidae
- Genus: Paranepsia
- Species: P. amydra

Binomial name
- Paranepsia amydra Turner, 1916

Species of moth

Paranepsia amydra is a species of moth of the family Tortricidae. It is found in Australia, where it has been recorded from Queensland.

The wingspan is about 16 mm. The forewings are fuscous with dark-fuscous markings. The hindwings are fuscous.
