= Eana derivana =

Scientific classification
- Domain: Eukaryota
- Kingdom: Animalia
- Phylum: Arthropoda
- Class: Insecta
- Order: Lepidoptera
- Family: Tortricidae
- Genus: Eana
- Species: E. derivana

Binomial name
- Eana derivana (de La Harpe, 1858)

Species of moth

Eana derivana is a species of moth belonging to the family Tortricidae.

It is native to Europe.
