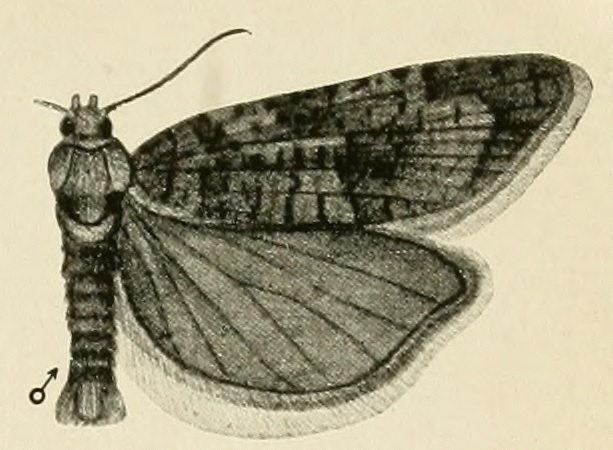
- Amphicoecia adamana

Scientific classification
- Kingdom: Animalia
- Phylum: Arthropoda
- Class: Insecta
- Order: Lepidoptera
- Family: Tortricidae
- Tribe: Cnephasiini
- Genus: Amphicoecia; Razowski, 1975

= Amphicoecia =

Genus of tortrix moths

Amphicoecia is a genus of moths belonging to the subfamily Tortricinae of the family Tortricidae.

== Species ==
- Amphicoecia adamana (Kennel, 1919)
- Amphicoecia phasmatica (Meyrick in Caradja & Meyrick, 1937)

== See also ==
- List of Tortricidae genera
