= Synochoneura dentana =

Scientific classification
- Kingdom: Animalia
- Phylum: Arthropoda
- Class: Insecta
- Order: Lepidoptera
- Family: Tortricidae
- Genus: Synochoneura
- Species: S. dentana

Binomial name
- Synochoneura dentana Wang & Li, 2007

Species of moth

Synochoneura dentana is a species of moth of the family Tortricidae. It is found in Guizhou, China.
