= Amphicoecia phasmatica =

Scientific classification
- Kingdom: Animalia
- Phylum: Arthropoda
- Class: Insecta
- Order: Lepidoptera
- Family: Tortricidae
- Genus: Amphicoecia
- Species: A. phasmatica

Binomial name
- Amphicoecia phasmatica (Meyrick in Caradja & Meyrick, 1937)

Synonyms
- Meritastis phasmatica Meyrick in Caradja & Meyrick, 1937; Amphicoecia strennua Razowski, 1975

Species of moth

Amphicoecia phasmatica is a species of moth of the family Tortricidae found in China's Yunnan province.
