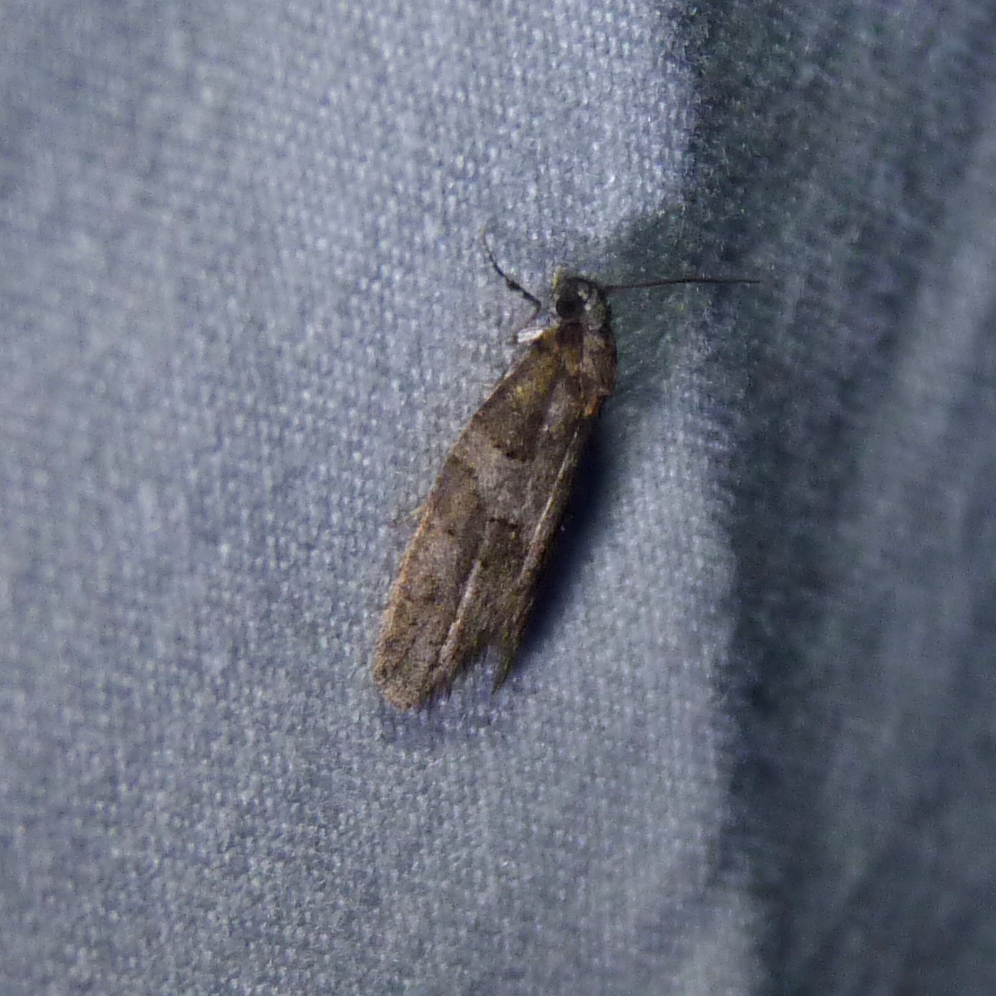

Scientific classification
- Domain: Eukaryota
- Kingdom: Animalia
- Phylum: Arthropoda
- Class: Insecta
- Order: Lepidoptera
- Family: Tortricidae
- Genus: Decodes
- Species: D. basiplagana

Binomial name
- Decodes basiplagana (Walsingham, 1879)

Synonyms
- Sciaphila basiplagana Walsingham, 1879

= Decodes basiplagana =

Species of moth

Decodes basiplagana is a moth of the family Tortricidae. It is widespread in North America, including Illinois, Massachusetts, Minnesota, New Jersey, Oklahoma, Ontario, Tennessee and Wisconsin

The length of the forewings is 8.1–9 mm.

The larvae feed on Quercus lobata.
