= Taeniarchis catenata =

Scientific classification
- Kingdom: Animalia
- Phylum: Arthropoda
- Class: Insecta
- Order: Lepidoptera
- Family: Tortricidae
- Genus: Taeniarchis
- Species: T. catenata

Binomial name
- Taeniarchis catenata (Meyrick, 1910)

Synonyms
- Cnephasia catenata Meyrick, 1910; Arotrophora hemiplecta Turner, 1916; Eucosma ochrotorna Turner, 1946

Species of insect

Taeniarchis catenata is a species of moth of the family Tortricidae. It is found in Australia, where it has been recorded from Queensland and New South Wales.

The wingspan is about 15 mm (0.59 in). The forewings are ochreous whitish, strigulated (finely streaked) with brownish fuscous, which forms wavy transverse lines in the basal half of the wing and towards the apex. The hindwings are ochreous whitish, reticulated (a net-like pattern) with blackish towards the apex, termen and tornus.
