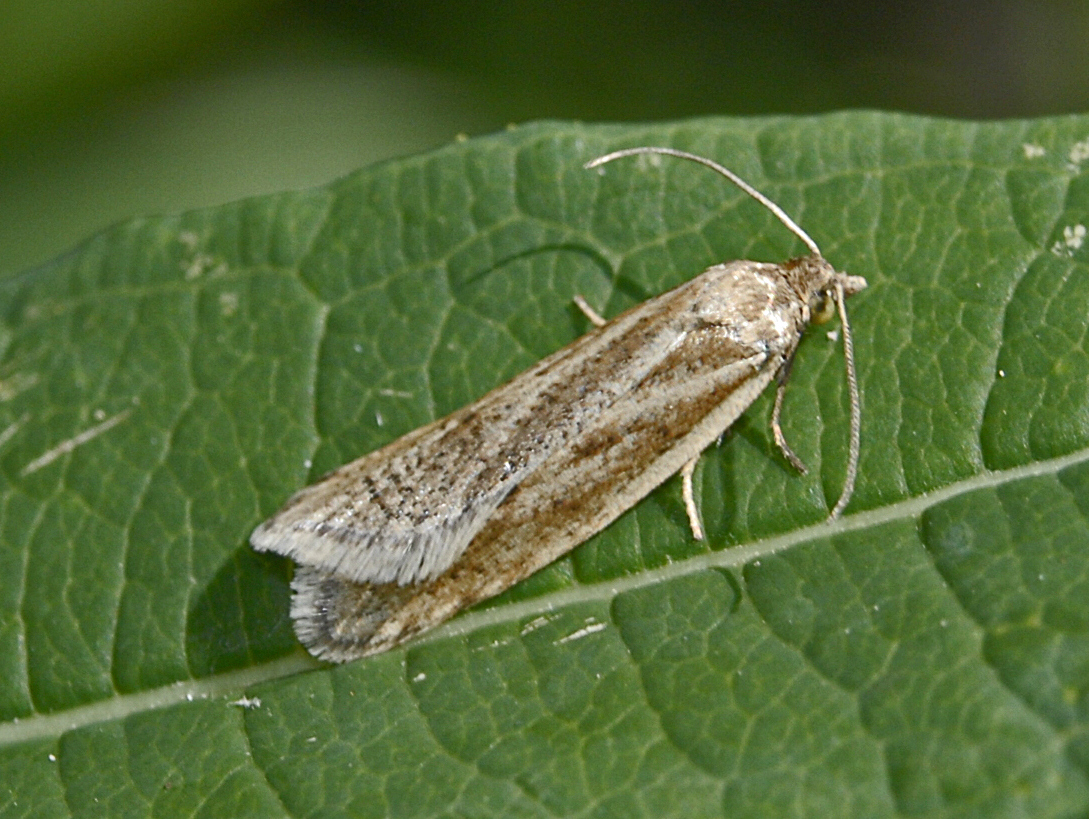
- Eana osseana

Scientific classification
- Domain: Eukaryota
- Kingdom: Animalia
- Phylum: Arthropoda
- Class: Insecta
- Order: Lepidoptera
- Family: Tortricidae
- Genus: Eana
- Species: E. osseana

Binomial name
- Eana osseana (Scopoli, 1763)

Synonyms
- Phalaena osseana Scopoli, 1763; Cnephasia (Ablabia) osseana r. alpicola Ral, 1953; Cnephasia (Ablabia) osseana var. alpicolana Ral, 1953; Tinea angulella Thunberg & Wenner, 1794; Eana darvaza batangiana Razowski, 1965; Cnephasia biformana Hauder, 1913; Tortrix boreana Zetterstedt, 1839; Cnephasia (Ablabia) osseana r. borreoni Ral, 1953; Cnephasia cantiana Curtis, 1826; Nephodesme osseana darvaza Obraztsov, 1943; Ablabia osseana ab. impunctana Strand, 1901; Sciaphila niveosana Packard, 1866; Cnephasia pallida Muller-Rutz, 1920; Tortrix pratana Hubner, [1811-1813]; Cnephasia (Ablabia) osseana r. ratana Ral, 1953; Cnephasia (Ablabia) ossesana f. pseudolongana Ral, 1953; Tortrix quadripunctana Haworth, [1811]; Aphelia quadripunetata Wood & Westwood, 1852; Cnephasia (Ablabia) osseana f. solfatarana Ral, 1953; Tortrix steineriana var. stelviana Milliere, 1874

= Eana osseana =

Species of moth

Eana osseana, common name dotted shade, is a moth of the family Tortricidae.

== Description ==
Eana osseana has a wingspan reaching 16–23 millimetres (0.63–0.91 in). The basic coloration is pale brown, with a few obscure brown markings. Meyrick describes it - Forewings very elongate, costa almost straight, termen slightly sinuate brownish-ochreous, sometimes ferruginous-tinged, seldom whitish- ochreous; an irregular spot in disc before and another beyond middle, and a triangular apical patch fuscous, often indistinct or sometimes obsolete. Hindwings grey.

Adults fly from June to August and they are attracted to light. The larvae live within a silken tube. They are polyphagous, feeding on many herbaceous plants, grasses and mosses.

== Distribution and habitat ==
This species is widespread in most of Europe, in the East Palearctic realm and in the Nearctic realm. It prefers grassland, downland and moorland.
