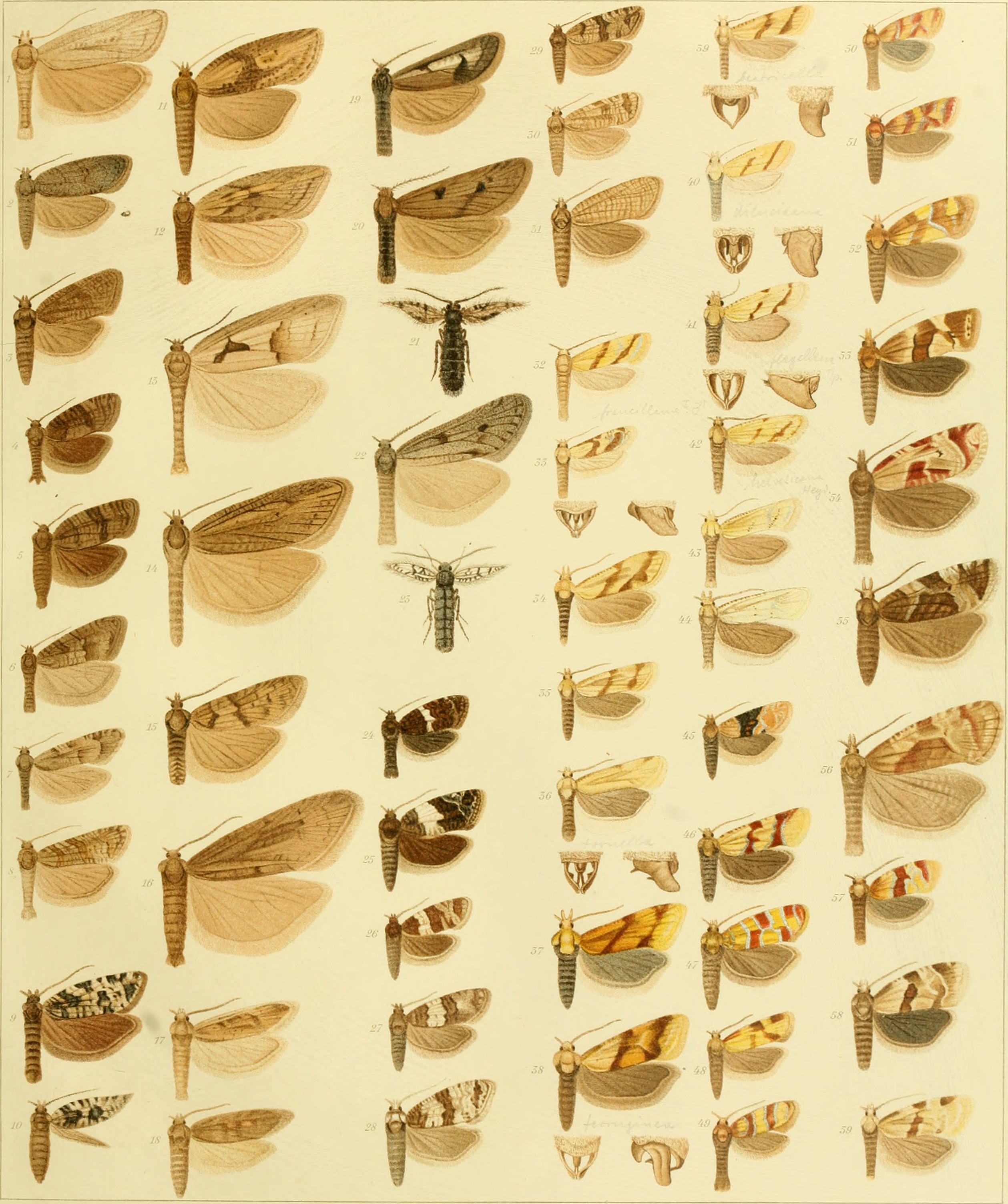
- Doloploca punctulana, Doloploca praeviella, Doloploca characterana and Doloploca buraetica in Die palaearktischen tortriciden figures 11-14

Scientific classification
- Kingdom: Animalia
- Phylum: Arthropoda
- Class: Insecta
- Order: Lepidoptera
- Family: Tortricidae
- Subfamily: Tortricinae
- Tribe: Cnephasiini
- Genus: Doloploca; Hubner, [1825]

= Doloploca =

Genus of tortrix moths

Doloploca is a Palearctic genus of moths belonging to the subfamily Tortricinae of the family Tortricidae.

== Species ==
- Doloploca buraetica Staudinger, 1892 East Siberia
- Doloploca characterana Snellen, 1883 East Siberia
- Doloploca praeviella (Erschoff, 1877) East Siberia
- Doloploca punctulana ([Denis & Schiffermuller], 1775) Central Europe
- Doloploca supina Razowski, 1975

== See also ==
- List of Tortricidae genera
