= Taeniarchis =

Scientific classification
- Kingdom: Animalia
- Phylum: Arthropoda
- Class: Insecta
- Order: Lepidoptera
- Family: Tortricidae
- Tribe: Cnephasiini
- Genus: Taeniarchis; Meyrick, 1931

Genus of tortrix moths

Taeniarchis is a genus of moths belonging to the subfamily Tortricinae of the family Tortricidae.

== Species ==
- Taeniarchis acrotoma Diakonoff, 1953
- Taeniarchis catenata (Meyrick, 1910)
- Taeniarchis hestica Common, 1963
- Taeniarchis hexopa Diakonoff, 1966
- Taeniarchis periorma (Meyrick, 1910)
- Taeniarchis poliostoma Diakonoff, 1953
- Taeniarchis prodotis Diakonoff, 1966
- Taeniarchis spilozeucta Meyrick, 1931

== See also ==
- List of Tortricidae genera
