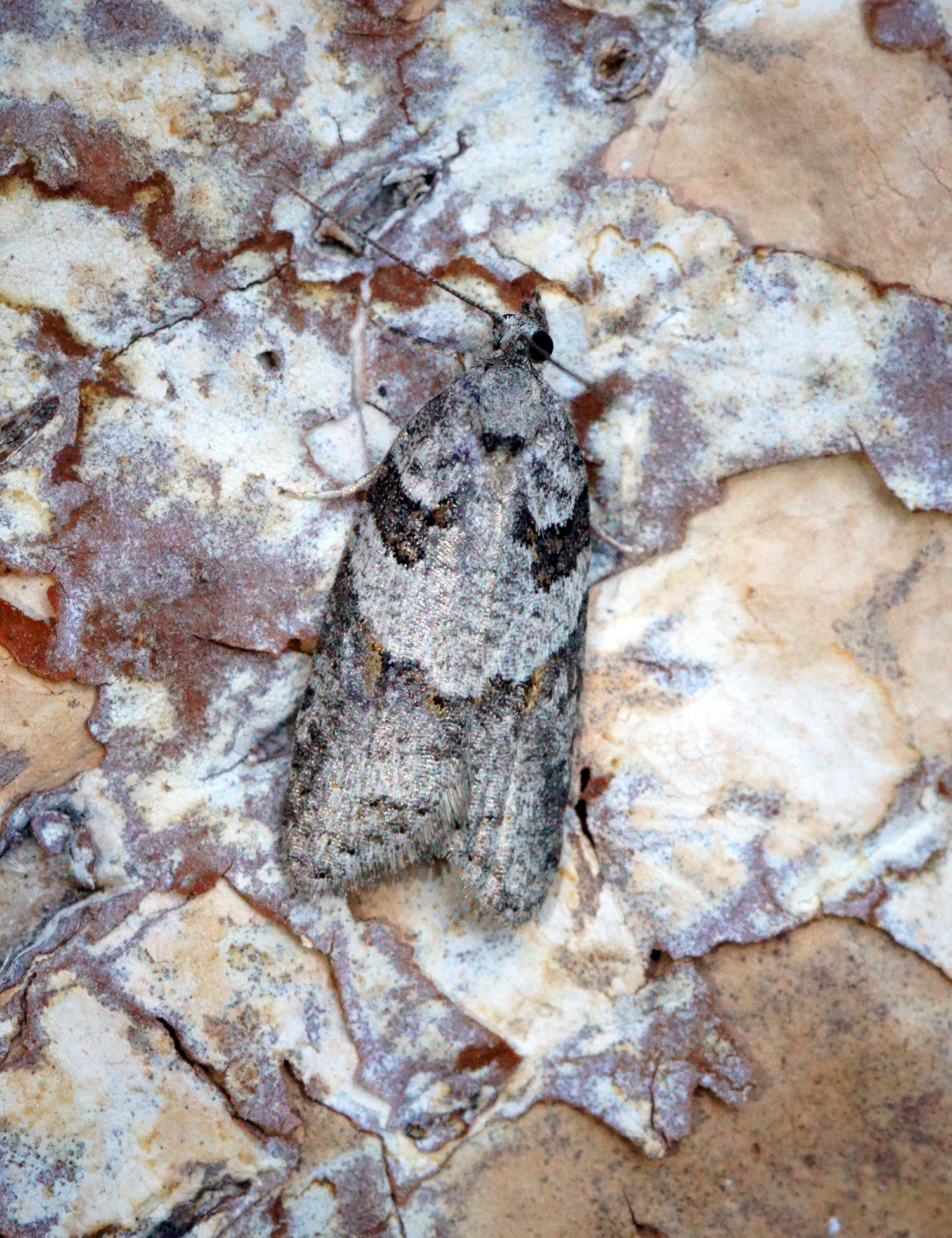

Scientific classification
- Domain: Eukaryota
- Kingdom: Animalia
- Phylum: Arthropoda
- Class: Insecta
- Order: Lepidoptera
- Family: Tortricidae
- Genus: Eana
- Species: E. incanana

Binomial name
- Eana incanana (Stephens, 1852)

Synonyms
- Cnephasia incanana Stephens, 1852; Cnephasia cinerana Humphreys & Westwood, 1845; Cnephasia incanana infuscata Réal, 1953

= Eana incanana =

Species of moth

Eana incanana is a moth of the family Tortricidae. It is found in most of Europe (except Iceland, Ireland, Portugal and part of the Balkan Peninsula), east to the eastern Palearctic realm.

The wingspan is 17–23 mm. Adults are on wing in July.

The larvae feed on the flowers of bluebell (Hyacinthoides non-scripta) and oxeye daisy (Leucanthemum vulgare).
