= Tortricodes selma =

Scientific classification
- Kingdom: Animalia
- Phylum: Arthropoda
- Class: Insecta
- Order: Lepidoptera
- Family: Tortricidae
- Genus: Tortricodes
- Species: T. selma

Binomial name
- Tortricodes selma Koçak, 1991

Species of moth

Tortricodes selma is a species of moth of the family Tortricidae. It is found in northern Turkey.

The wingspan is 17.5–21 mm for males and 21 mm for females. The forewings are shining brownish grey, while the hindwings are bright brownish grey.
