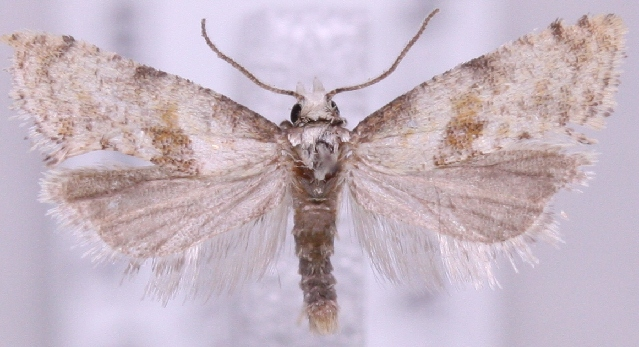

Scientific classification
- Domain: Eukaryota
- Kingdom: Animalia
- Phylum: Arthropoda
- Class: Insecta
- Order: Lepidoptera
- Family: Tortricidae
- Genus: Cochylidia
- Species: C. heydeniana

Binomial name
- Cochylidia heydeniana (Herrich-Schäffer, 1851)

Synonyms
- Tortrix (Cochylis) heydeniana Herrich-Schäffer, 1851; Phalonia almana Kennel, 1919; Cochylidia amseli Obraztsov, 1956; Conchylis erigerana Walsingham, 1891; Tortrix (Cochylis) heydeniana Herrich-Schäffer, 1849; Phalonia obraztsovi Amsel, 1951; Cochylidia padorana Byun Park & Lee, 1996; Cochylis pudorana Staudinger, 1859; Phalonia sabulicola Walsingham, 1900

= Cochylidia heydeniana =

Species of moth

Cochylidia heydeniana, the blue-fleabane conch, is a moth of the family Tortricidae. It was described by Gottlieb August Wilhelm Herrich-Schäffer in 1851. It is found from most of Europe to China (Xinjiang), Mongolia, Korea, Russia and Japan. The habitat consists of dry pastures, wasteland and sand dunes.

The wingspan is 9–13 millimetres (0.35–0.51 in). Adults are on wing from April to May and again in July in two generations per year.

The larvae feed on Erigeron acer, Conyza canadensis and Solidago virgaurea. They have been recorded feeding on the seeds, as well as in the shoots.
