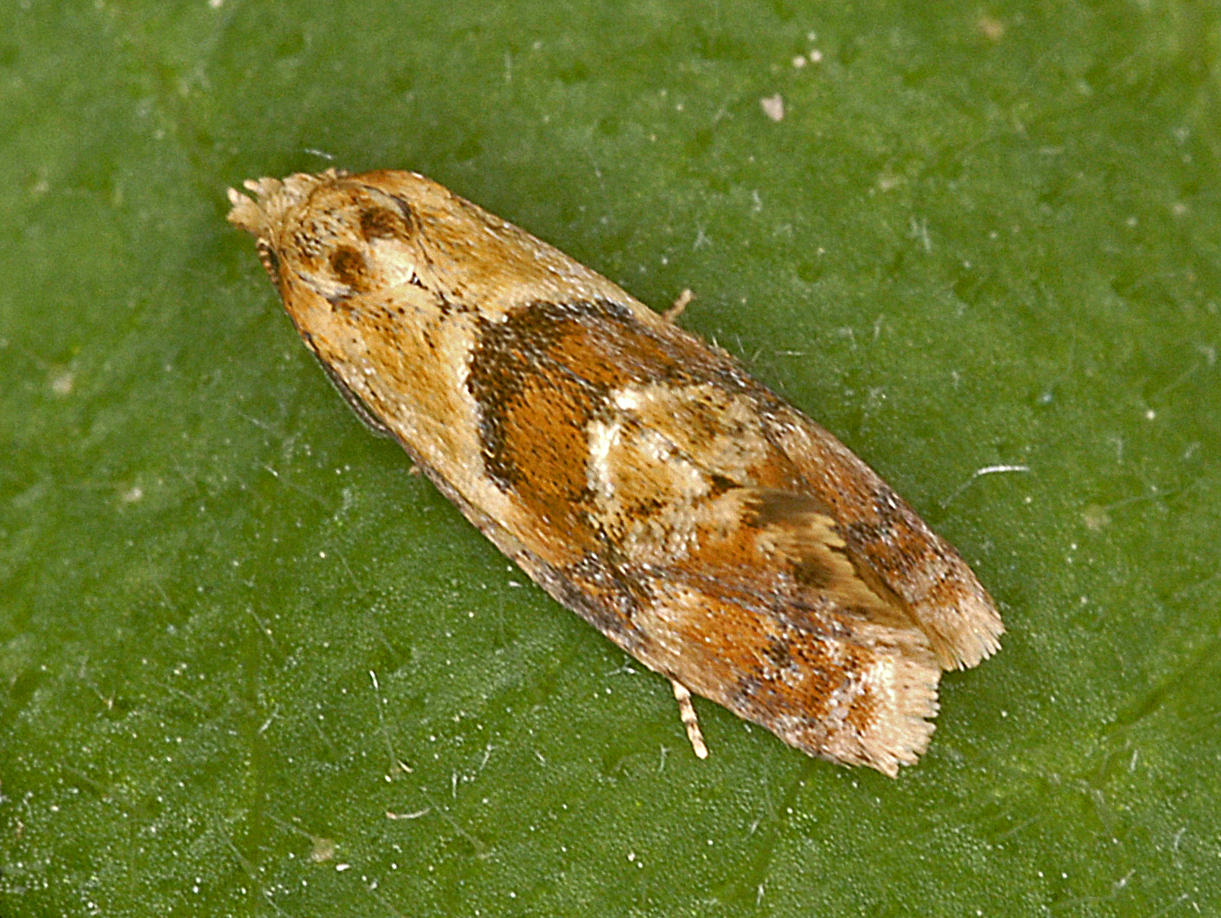
- Dorsal view
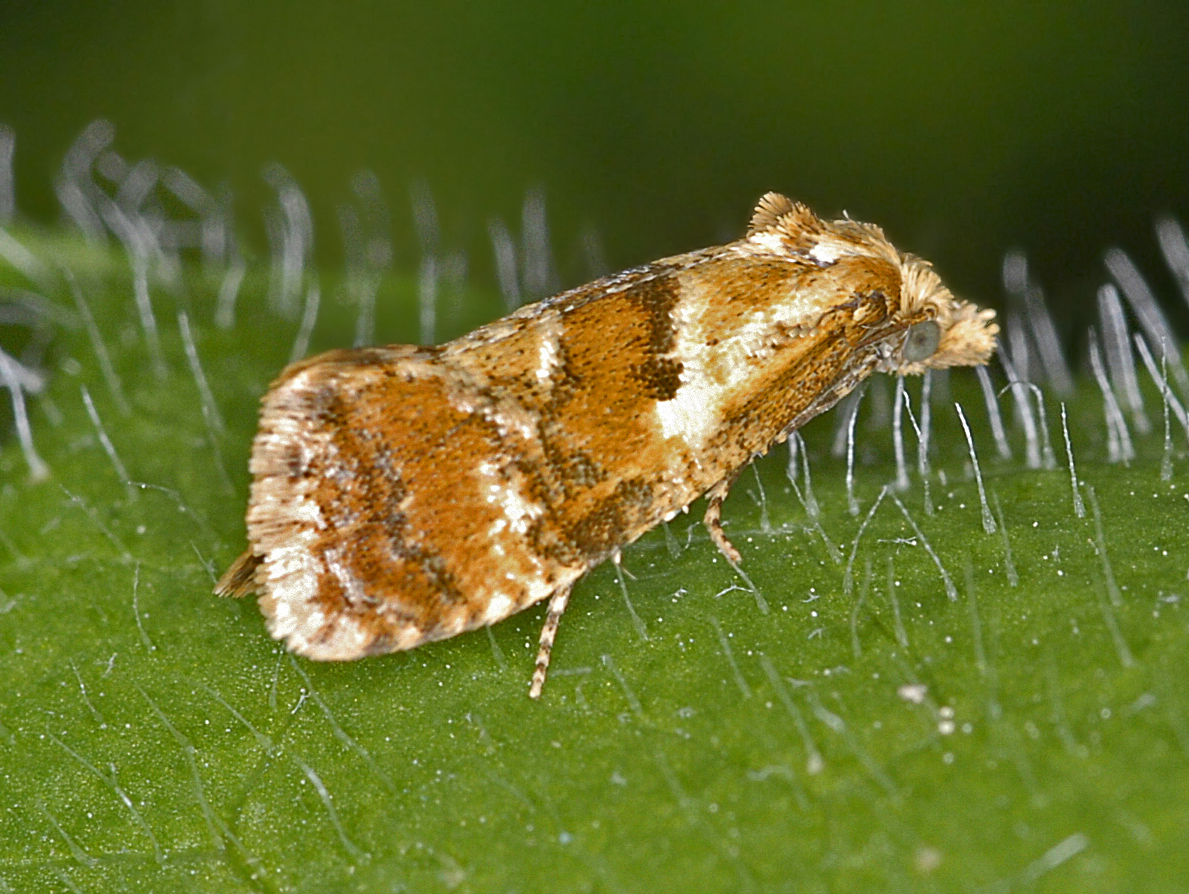
- Lateral view

Scientific classification
- Domain: Eukaryota
- Kingdom: Animalia
- Phylum: Arthropoda
- Class: Insecta
- Order: Lepidoptera
- Family: Tortricidae
- Genus: Cochylidia
- Species: C. rupicola

Binomial name
- Cochylidia rupicola (Curtis, 1834)

Synonyms
- Cochylis rupicola Curtis, 1834; Tortrix (Cochylis) humidana Herrich-Schäffer, 1851; Cochylis marginana Stephens, 1834; Eupoecilia rupicolana Bloomfield, 1873

= Cochylidia rupicola =

Species of moth

Cochylidia rupicola, the chalk-cliff tortrix or conch, is a moth of the family Tortricidae.

== Description ==
Cochylidia rupicola is a small moth with a wingspan of 13–15 millimetres (0.51–0.59 in). Forewings show a rounded apex, a broad brown median fascia and characteristic postmedian and subapical markings. Julius von Kennel provides a full description.

Adults are on wing from June to the end of July. They typically fly from dusk onwards.

The larvae feed on the flowers and seeds of hemp agrimony (Eupatorium cannabinum), gypsywort (Lycopus europaeus), and of Chrysocoma linosyris during August to October.

== Distribution ==
This univoltine species is present in most of Europe and the Near East.

== Habitat ==
The chalk-cliff tortrix can be found in a wide range of habitats, on the woodland margins, in marshes and fens, in stream banks and in lanes.
