= Protopterna chalybias =

Scientific classification
- Kingdom: Animalia
- Phylum: Arthropoda
- Class: Insecta
- Order: Lepidoptera
- Family: Tortricidae
- Genus: Protopterna
- Species: P. chalybias

Binomial name
- Protopterna chalybias Meyrick, 1908

Species of moth

Protopterna chalybias is a species of moth of the family Tortricidae. It is found in India (Assam).

The wingspan is 10–12 mm. The forewings are blackish-fuscous, the basal area sometimes ochreous or brownish more or less mixed with blackish. There are four transverse series of blue-leaden-metallic finely black-edged spots or marks, the first near the base with an enlarged spot on the basal portion of the costa, two together before the middle rising from whitish costal strigulae, and one before the termen. There is a patch of ferruginous-ochreous suffusion on the posterior two-fifths of the costa, marked with four small ochreous-white costal spots, of which the first originates an oblique blue-leaden-metallic black-edged elongate mark. The hindwings are grey, thinly scaled and with the apex and termen suffused with dark fuscous.
