= Eana samarcandae =

Scientific classification
- Kingdom: Animalia
- Phylum: Arthropoda
- Class: Insecta
- Order: Lepidoptera
- Family: Tortricidae
- Genus: Eana
- Species: E. samarcandae

Binomial name
- Eana samarcandae Razowski, 1958

Species of moth

Eana samarcandae is a species of moth of the family Tortricidae. It is found in Uzbekistan and Kyrgyzstan.
