= Synochoneura =

Scientific classification
- Domain: Eukaryota
- Kingdom: Animalia
- Phylum: Arthropoda
- Class: Insecta
- Order: Lepidoptera
- Family: Tortricidae
- Tribe: Cnephasiini
- Genus: Synochoneura; Obraztsov, 1955

Genus of tortrix moths

Synochoneura is a genus of moths belonging to the subfamily Tortricinae of the family Tortricidae.

== Species ==
- Synochoneura dentana Wang & Li, 2007
- Synochoneura fansipangana Razowski, 2008
- Synochoneura ochriclivis (Meyrick, in Caradja, 1931)
- Synochoneura sapana Razowski, 2008
- Synochoneura tapaishani (Caradja, 1939)

== See also ==
- List of Tortricidae genera
