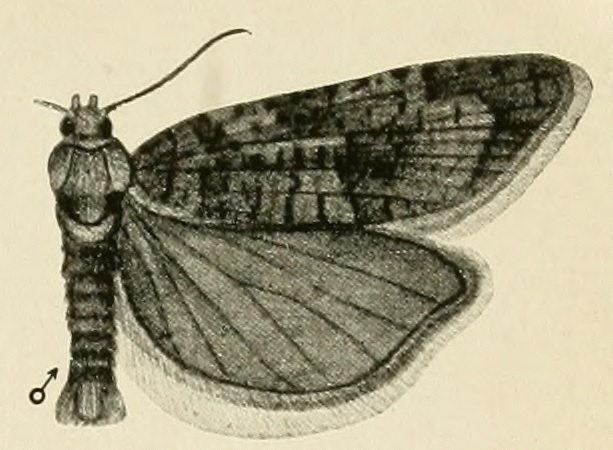

Scientific classification
- Kingdom: Animalia
- Phylum: Arthropoda
- Class: Insecta
- Order: Lepidoptera
- Family: Tortricidae
- Genus: Amphicoecia
- Species: A. adamana

Binomial name
- Amphicoecia adamana (Kennel, 1919)

Synonyms
- Tortricodes adamana Kennel, 1919

= Amphicoecia adamana =

Species of moth

Amphicoecia adamana is a species of moth of the family Tortricidae. It is found in Russia (Siberia, Altai Mountains).

The wingspan is 24–27 mm. Adults have been recorded on wing in June and July.
