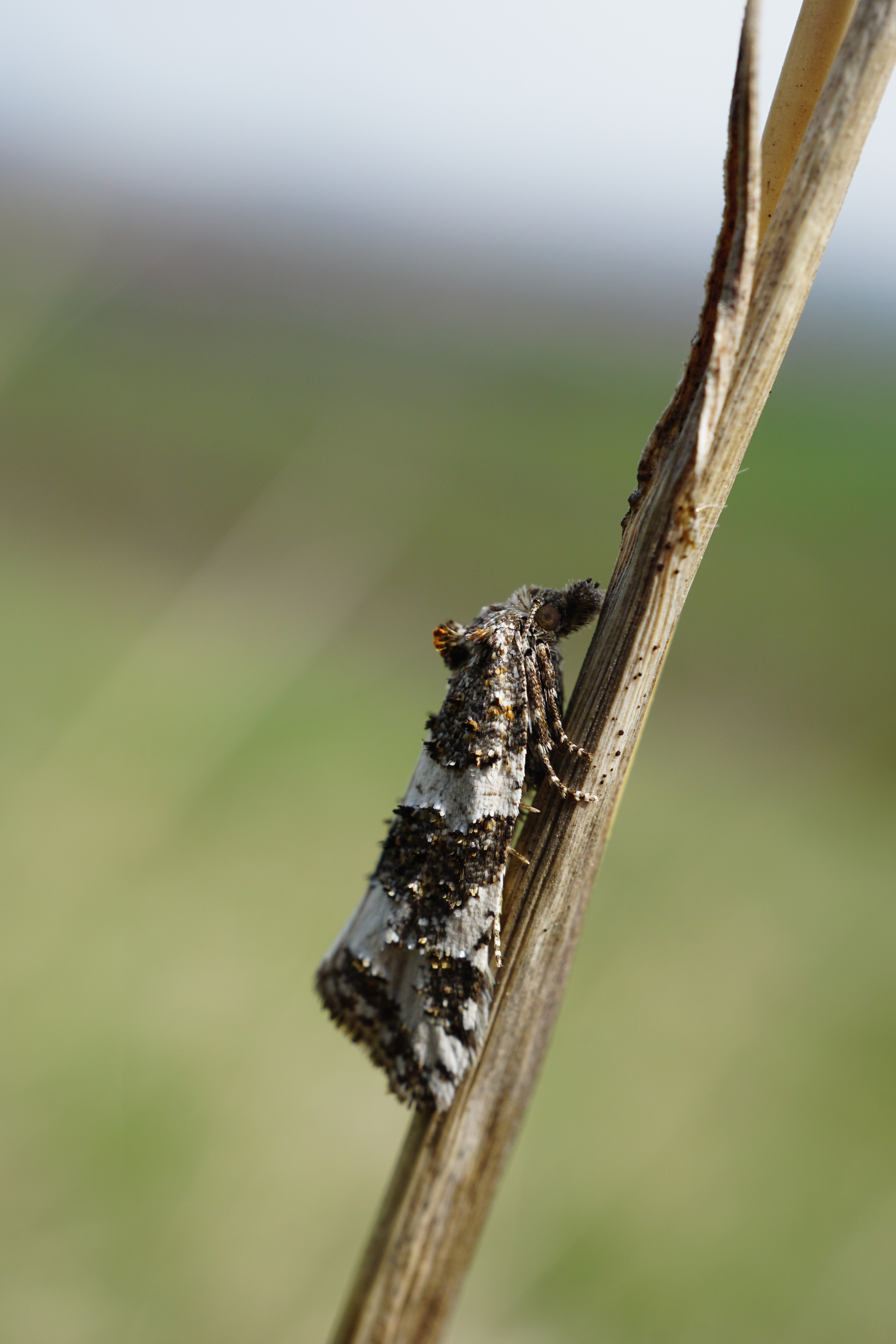

Scientific classification
- Kingdom: Animalia
- Phylum: Arthropoda
- Class: Insecta
- Order: Lepidoptera
- Family: Tortricidae
- Genus: Xerocnephasia
- Species: X. rigana

Binomial name
- Xerocnephasia rigana (Sodoffsky, 1829)

= Xerocnephasia rigana =

Species of tortrix moths

Xerocnephasia rigana is a species of moth, belonging to the genus Xerocnephasia.

The species was described in 1829 by Carl Heinrich Wilhelm Sodoffsky as Tortrix rigana.

It is native to Europe.
