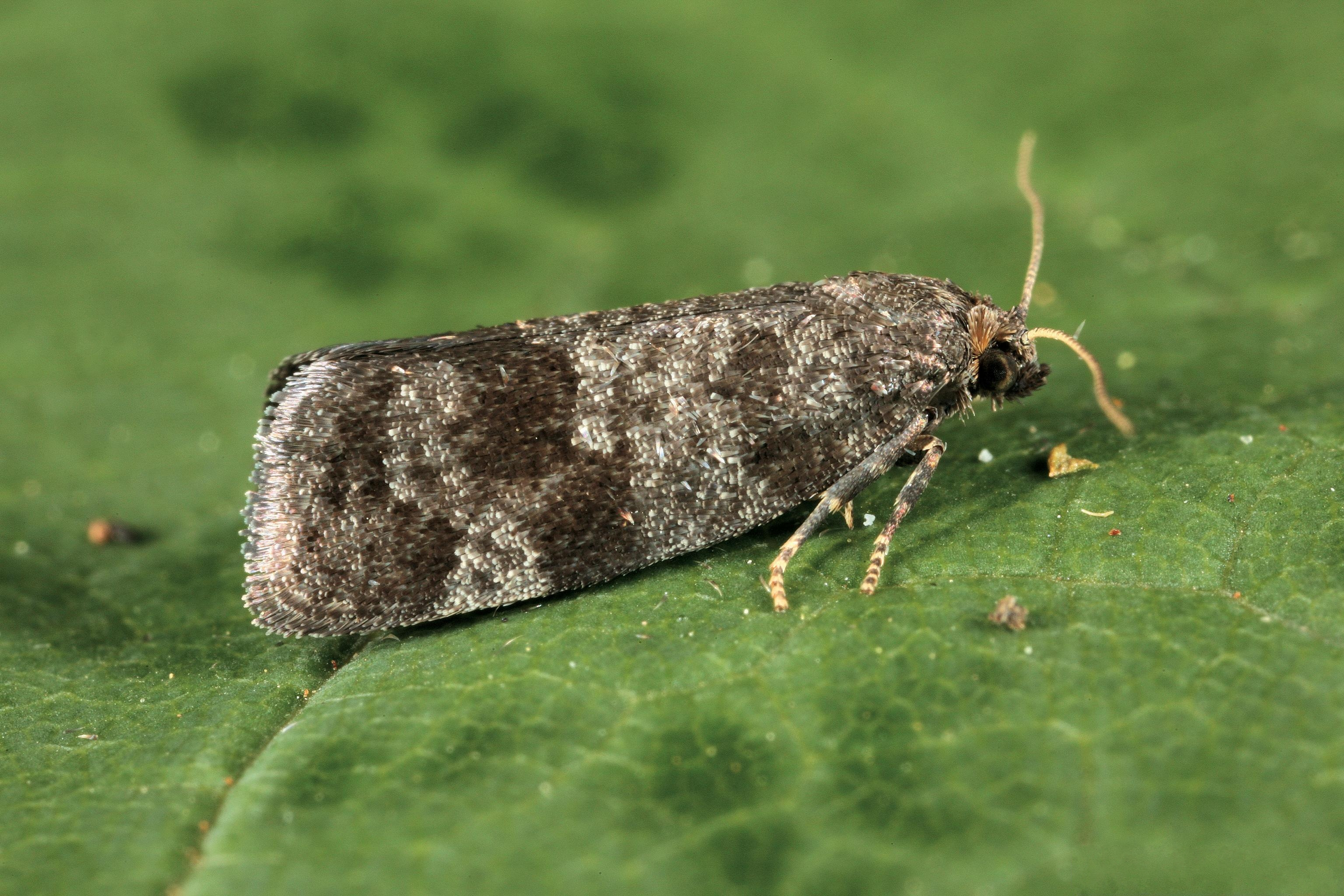

Scientific classification
- Kingdom: Animalia
- Phylum: Arthropoda
- Clade: Pancrustacea
- Class: Insecta
- Order: Lepidoptera
- Family: Tortricidae
- Subfamily: Tortricinae
- Tribe: Cnephasiini
- Genus: Neosphaleroptera; Ral, 1953
- Species: N. nubilana

Binomial name
- Neosphaleroptera nubilana (Hubner, [1796-1799])

Synonyms
- Tortrix nubilana Hubner, 1799; Tortrix alniana [Denis & Schiffermuller], 1775; Tortrix (Grapholitha) conradii Portchinskij, 1888; Tortrix glareana Schrank, 1802; Tortrix perfuscana Haworth, [1811]

= Neosphaleroptera =

Monotypic genus of tortrix moths

Neosphaleroptera is a genus of moths belonging to the subfamily Tortricinae of the family Tortricidae. It contains only one species, Neosphaleroptera nubilana, which is found in almost all of Europe and the Near East.

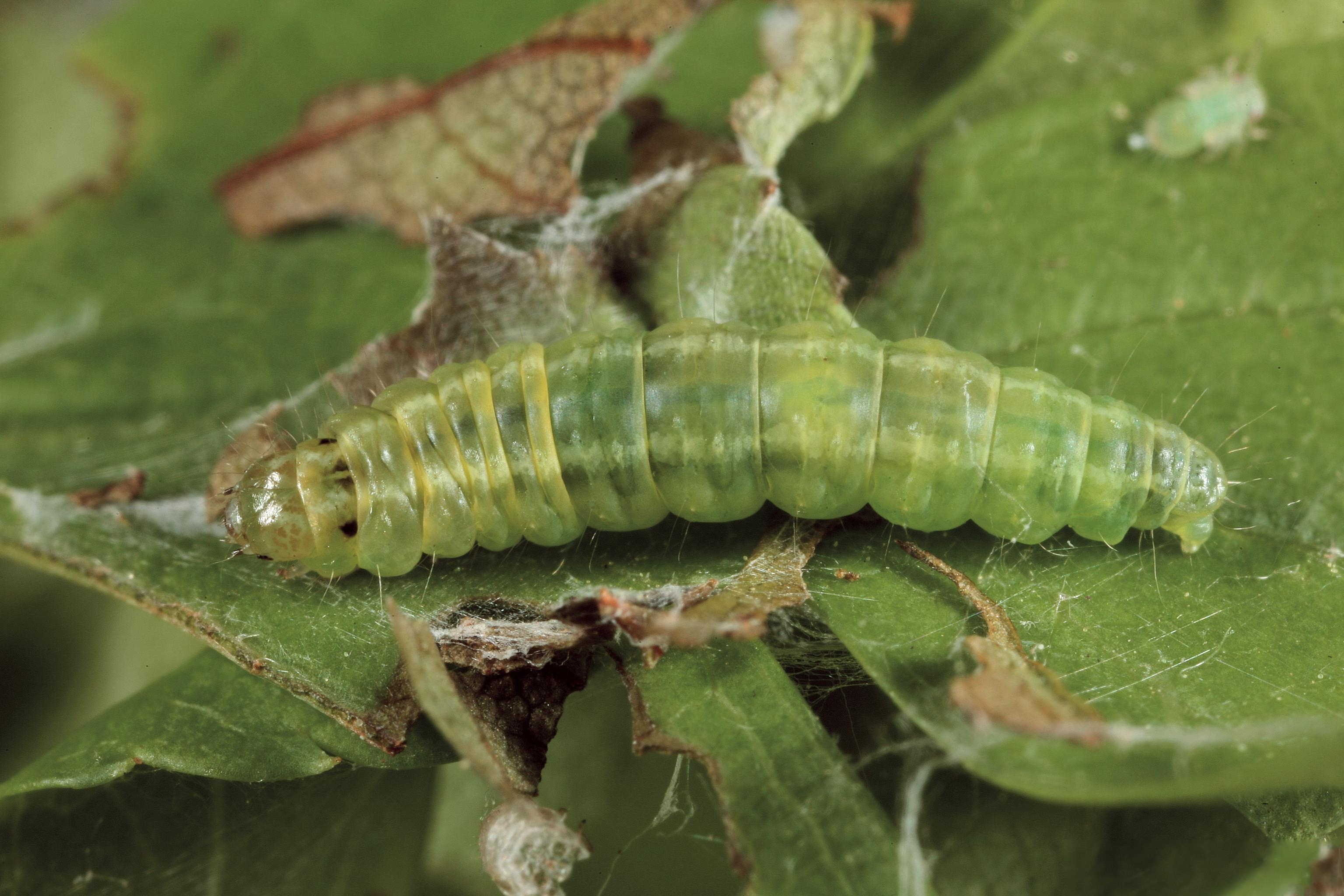
Larva

The wingspan is 12–14 mm. Adults are on wing from June to July.

The larvae feed on Crataegus, Prunus and Pyrus species. They spin together the leaves of their host plant and feed from within.

== See also ==
- List of Tortricidae genera
