= Doloploca punctulana =

Scientific classification
- Kingdom: Animalia
- Phylum: Arthropoda
- Class: Insecta
- Order: Lepidoptera
- Family: Tortricidae
- Genus: Doloploca
- Species: D. punctulana

Binomial name
- Doloploca punctulana ([Denis & Schiffermuller], 1775)

Species of moth

Doloploca punctulana is a moth belonging to the family Tortricidae first described by Michael Denis and Ignaz Schiffermüller in 1775.

It is native to Europe.
