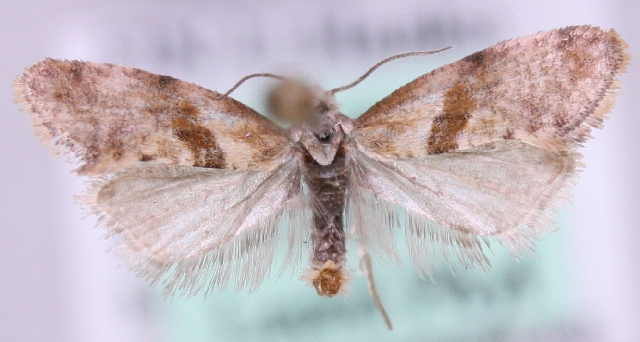

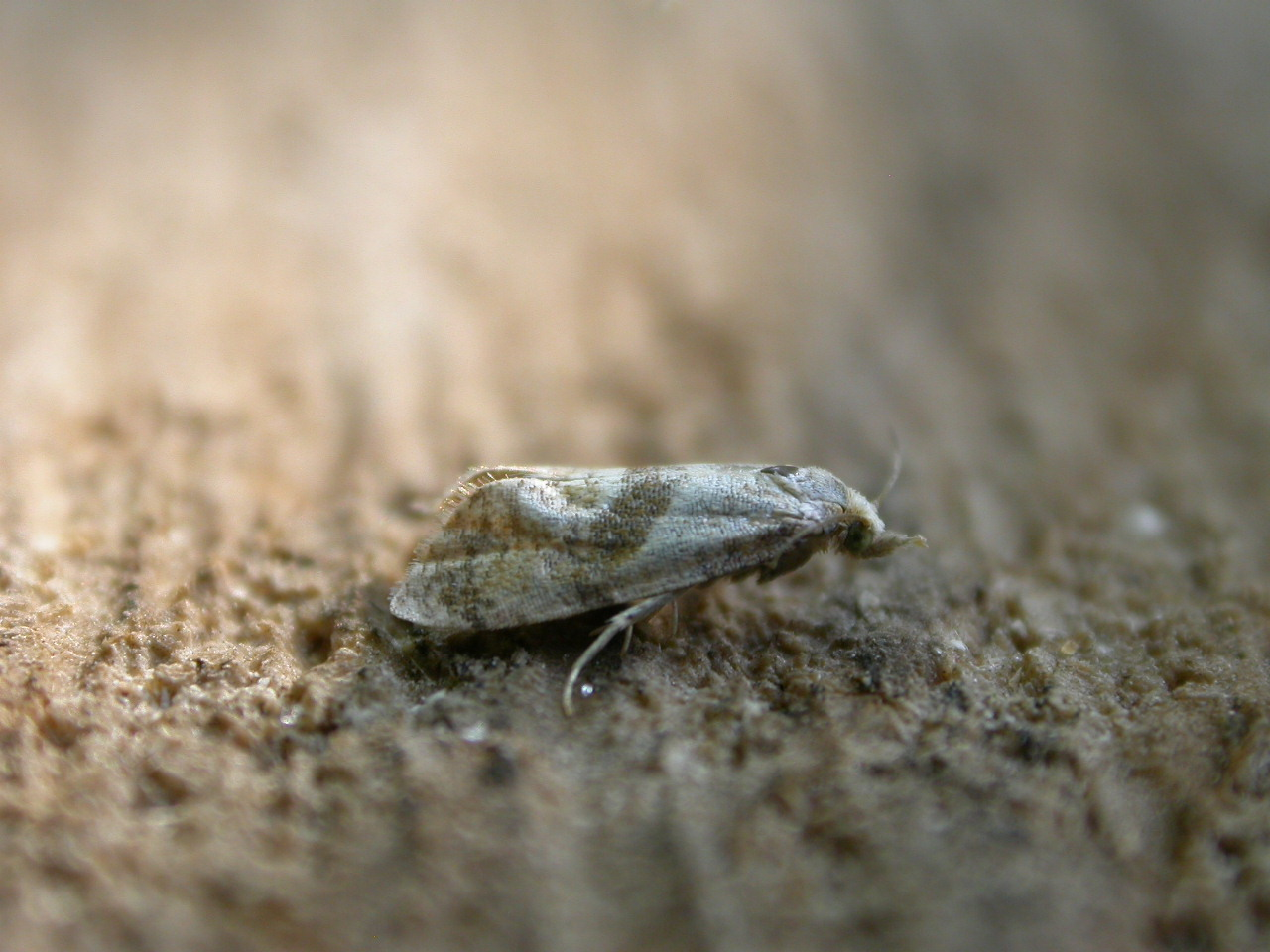

Scientific classification
- Domain: Eukaryota
- Kingdom: Animalia
- Phylum: Arthropoda
- Class: Insecta
- Order: Lepidoptera
- Family: Tortricidae
- Genus: Cochylidia
- Species: C. implicitana

Binomial name
- Cochylidia implicitana (Wocke, 1856)

Synonyms
- Cochylis implicitana Wocke, in Herrich-Schaffer, 1856; Eupoecilia anthemidana Stainton, 1859; Cochylis coercitana Staudinger, 1859; Cochylis gratiosana Laharpe, 1858; Cochylis noctulatana Agenjo, 1952

= Cochylidia implicitana =

Species of moth

Cochylidia implicitana, the chamomile conch, is a moth of the family Tortricidae. It was described by Wocke in 1856. It is found in most of Europe, except Ireland and most of the Balkan Peninsula. Outside of Europe, it is found in Morocco, the Alatau mountains in Central Asia, Iran and China (Xinjiang). The habitat consists of waste ground and verges.

The wingspan is 10–14 millimetres (0.39–0.55 in). Adults are on wing from May to August in one generation per year.

The larvae feed on a wide range of plants, including Artemisia campestris, Matricaria, Aster, Anthemis, Solidago, Chrysanthemum, Alchemilla, Helichrysum and Tanacetum species.
