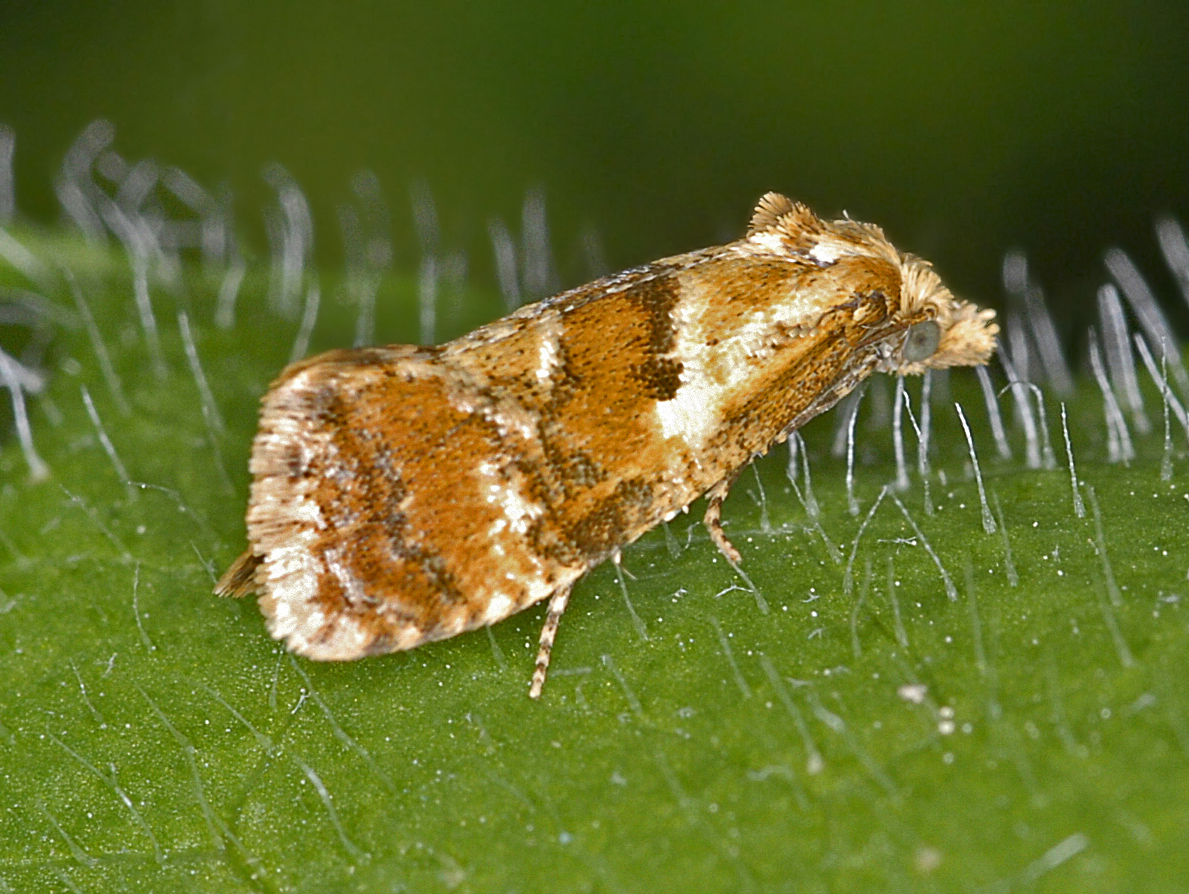
- Cochylidia rupicola

Scientific classification
- Domain: Eukaryota
- Kingdom: Animalia
- Phylum: Arthropoda
- Class: Insecta
- Order: Lepidoptera
- Family: Tortricidae
- Tribe: Cochylini
- Genus: Cochylidia; Obraztsov, 1956

= Cochylidia =

Genus of tortrix moths

Cochylidia is a genus of moths belonging to the family Tortricidae.

== Species ==
- Cochylidia altivaga Diakonoff, 1976
- Cochylidia contumescens (Meyrick, 1931)
- Cochylidia heydeniana (Herrich-Schäffer, 1851)
- Cochylidia implicitana (Wocke, in Herrich-Schäffer, 1856)
- Cochylidia liui Ying-Hui Sun & H.H. Li, 2012
- Cochylidia moguntiana (Rössler, 1864)
- Cochylidia multispinalis Ying-Hui Sun & H.H. Li, 2012
- Cochylidia oblonga Y.Q. Liu & X.S. Ge, 2012
- Cochylidia richteriana (Fischer von Röslerstamm, 1837)
- Cochylidia rupicola (Curtis, 1834)
- Cochylidia subroseana (Haworth, [1811])

== See also ==
- List of Tortricidae genera
