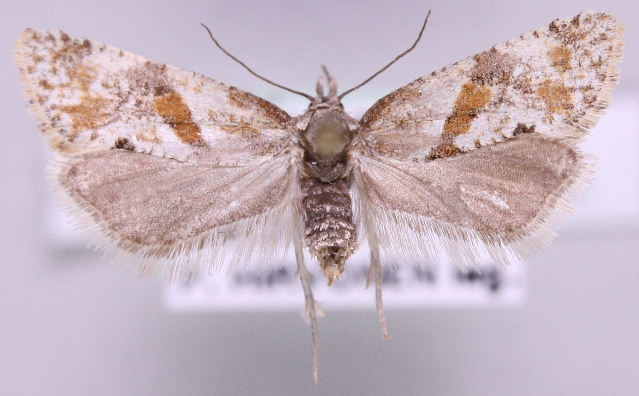

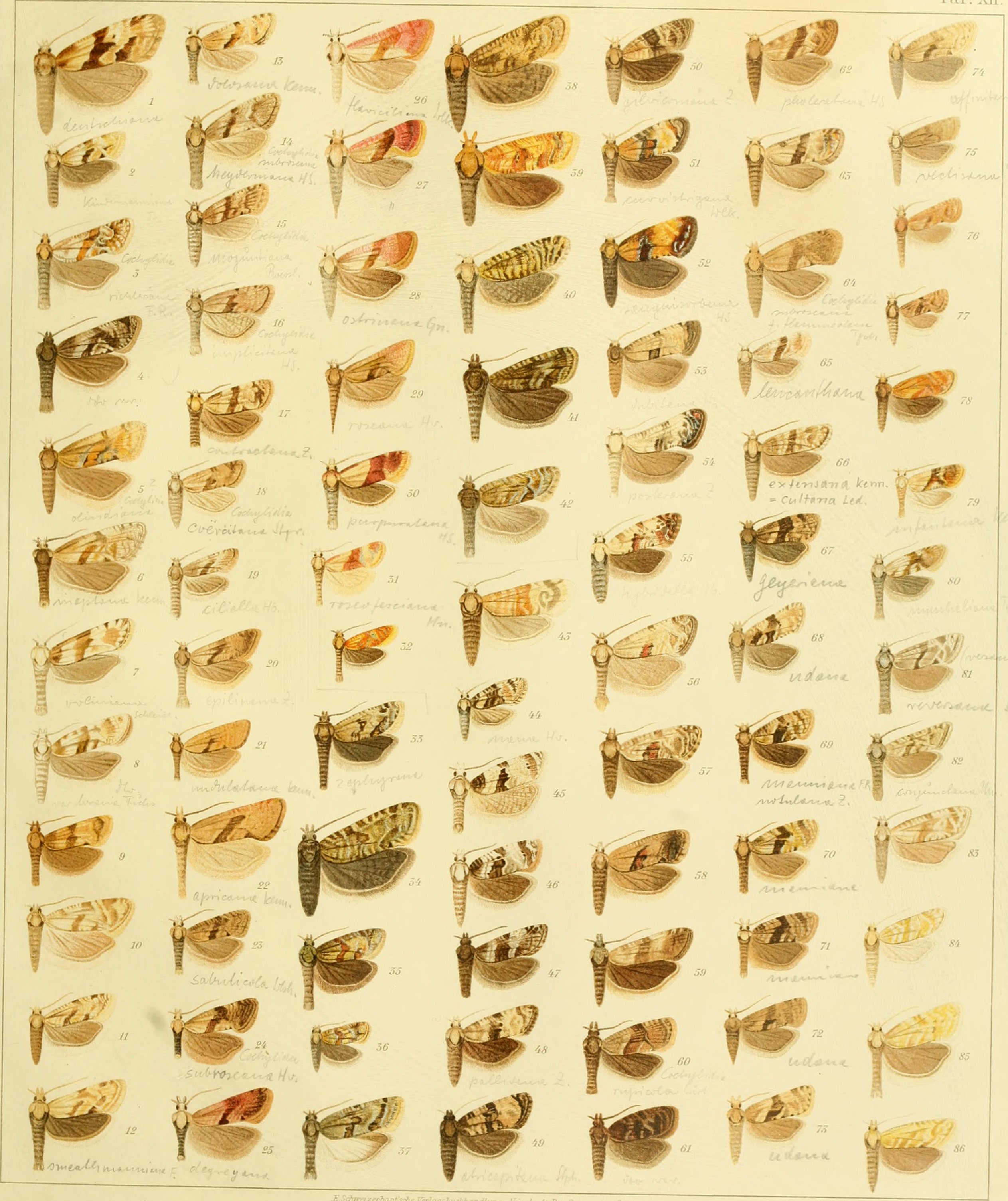
- In Julius von Kennel's Die palaearktischen tortriciden, figures 3, 4, 5, 6

Scientific classification
- Kingdom: Animalia
- Phylum: Arthropoda
- Class: Insecta
- Order: Lepidoptera
- Family: Tortricidae
- Genus: Cochylidia
- Species: C. richteriana

Binomial name
- Cochylidia richteriana (Fischer von Röslerstamm, 1837)

Synonyms
- Cochylis richteriana Fischer von Röslerstamm, 1837; Conchylis ineptana Kennel, 1901; Conchylis olindiana Snellen, 1883; Phalonia xanthodryas Meyrick in Caradja & Meyrick, 1937

= Cochylidia richteriana =

Species of moth

Cochylidia richteriana is a moth of the family Tortricidae. It was described by Josef Emanuel Fischer von Röslerstamm in 1837. It is found from central and northern Europe to Mongolia, China (Beijing, Hebei, Heilongjiang, Hunan, Inner Mongolia, Liaoning, Ningxia, Qinghai, Shandong, Shanxi, Sichuan, Tianjin), the Russian Far East (Shilka, Minussinsk, Amur), Korea and Japan.

The wingspan is 15–17 mm. Adults have been recorded on wing from April to August.

The larvae feed on Artemisia campestris and Achillea millefolium.
