= Protopterna eremia =

Scientific classification
- Kingdom: Animalia
- Phylum: Arthropoda
- Clade: Pancrustacea
- Class: Insecta
- Order: Lepidoptera
- Family: Tortricidae
- Genus: Protopterna
- Species: P. eremia

Binomial name
- Protopterna eremia Yasuda & Razowski, 1991

Species of moth

Protopterna eremia is a species of moth of the family Tortricidae. It is found in Japan on the island of Honshu.

The wingspan is about 13 millimetres (0.51 in).
