= Protopterna =

Scientific classification
- Kingdom: Animalia
- Phylum: Arthropoda
- Class: Insecta
- Order: Lepidoptera
- Family: Tortricidae
- Tribe: Cnephasiini
- Genus: Protopterna; Meyrick, 1908

Genus of tortrix moths

Protopterna is a genus of moths belonging to the subfamily Tortricinae of the family Tortricidae.

== Species ==
- Protopterna chalybias Meyrick, 1908
- Protopterna citrophanes Meyrick, 1921
- Protopterna eremia Yasuda & Razowski, 1991

== See also ==
- List of Tortricidae genera
