= Cochylidia liui =

Scientific classification
- Domain: Eukaryota
- Kingdom: Animalia
- Phylum: Arthropoda
- Class: Insecta
- Order: Lepidoptera
- Family: Tortricidae
- Genus: Cochylidia
- Species: C. liui

Binomial name
- Cochylidia liui Ying-Hui Sun & H.H. Li, 2012

Species of moth

Cochylidia liui is a species of moth of the family Tortricidae. It is found in Guizhou, China.

The wingspan is about 12.5 millimetres (0.49 in).

== Etymology ==
The species is named in honour of Professor Youqiao Liu.
