= Cochylidia multispinalis =

Scientific classification
- Kingdom: Animalia
- Phylum: Arthropoda
- Class: Insecta
- Order: Lepidoptera
- Family: Tortricidae
- Genus: Cochylidia
- Species: C. multispinalis

Binomial name
- Cochylidia multispinalis Ying-Hui Sun & H.H. Li, 2012

Species of moth

Cochylidia multispinalis is a species of moth of the family Tortricidae. It is found in China (Anhui, Gansu, Guangdong, Guangxi, Guizhou, Hebei, Heilongjiang, Hunan, Sichuan).

The wingspan is 9–12 millimetres (0.35–0.47 in).
