= Cochylidia altivaga =

Scientific classification
- Domain: Eukaryota
- Kingdom: Animalia
- Phylum: Arthropoda
- Class: Insecta
- Order: Lepidoptera
- Family: Tortricidae
- Genus: Cochylidia
- Species: C. altivaga

Binomial name
- Cochylidia altivaga Diakonoff, 1976

Species of moth

Cochylidia altivaga is a species of moth of the family Tortricidae. It is found in China (Gansu, Sichuan) and Nepal.

The wingspan is about 14 mm.
