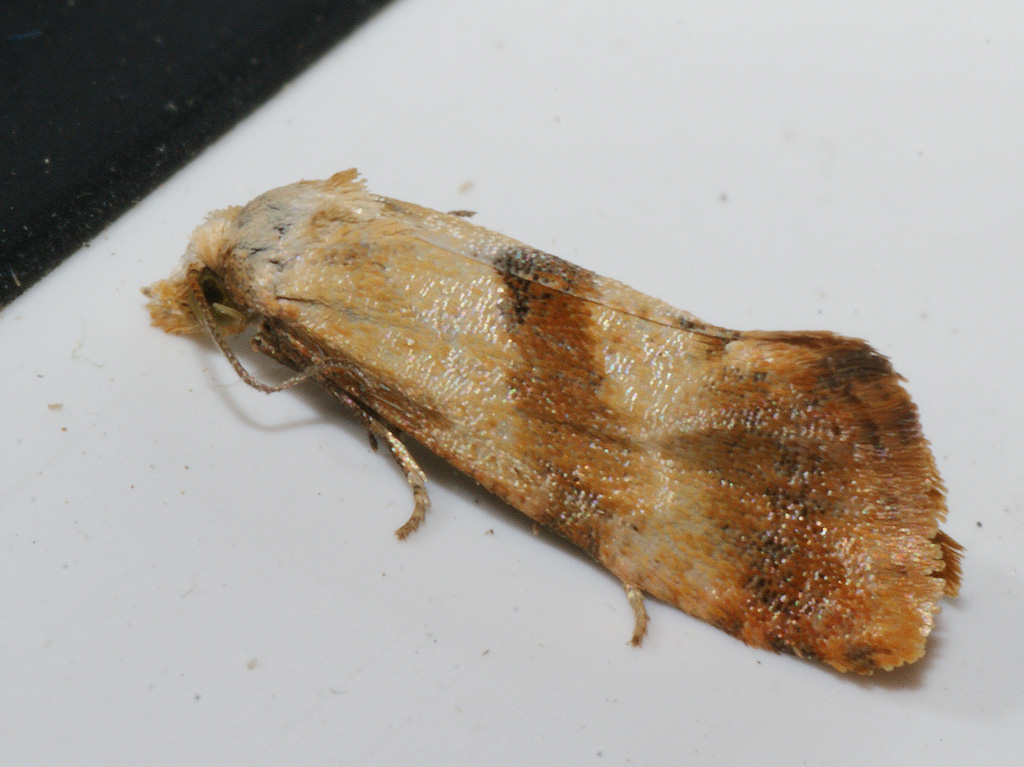

Scientific classification
- Domain: Eukaryota
- Kingdom: Animalia
- Phylum: Arthropoda
- Class: Insecta
- Order: Lepidoptera
- Family: Tortricidae
- Genus: Cochylidia
- Species: C. subroseana

Binomial name
- Cochylidia subroseana (Haworth, 1811)

Synonyms
- Tortrix subroseana Haworth, [1811]; Cochylidia subroseana f. derosana Razowski, 1960; Cochylis flammeolana Tengstrom, 1848; Cochylis phaleratana Herrich-Schäffer, 1847; Tortrix (Cochylis) phaleratana Herrich-Schäffer, 1851; Cochylidia subroseana f. roseotincta Razowski, 1960; Eupoecilia rubroseana Stephens, 1829

= Cochylidia subroseana =

Species of moth

Cochylidia subroseana, the dingy roseate conch, is a moth of the family Tortricidae. It was described by Adrian Hardy Haworth in 1811. It is found from most of Europe (except Ireland, the Benelux, Denmark, the Iberian Peninsula, Croatia and Ukraine) to China (Anhui, Hebei, Heilongjiang, Henan, Hunan, Jilin, Shanxi, Tianjin), Russia, Korea and Japan. It has also been recorded from North America.

The wingspan is 11–16 millimetres (0.43–0.63 in). Adults have been recorded on wing in June to August.

The larvae feed on Solidago species. They feed on the flowers of their host plant. The species overwinters in a cocoon.

== Subspecies ==
- Cochylidia subroseana subroseana
- Cochylidia subroseana roseotincta Razowski, 1960 (China)
