= Cochylidia oblonga =

Scientific classification
- Kingdom: Animalia
- Phylum: Arthropoda
- Class: Insecta
- Order: Lepidoptera
- Family: Tortricidae
- Genus: Cochylidia
- Species: C. oblonga

Binomial name
- Cochylidia oblonga Ying-Hui Sun & H.H. Li, 2012

Synonyms
- Cochylidia oblonga Liu & Ge, 1997 [nomen nudum]

Species of moth

Cochylidia oblonga is a species of moth of the family Tortricidae. It is found in China (Anhui, Fujian, Gansu, Guangdong, Guangxi, Henan, Hubei, Hunan, Jiangxi, Liaoning, Tianjin).

The wingspan is 9–12 millimetres (0.35–0.47 in) for males and 10–15 millimetres (0.39–0.59 in) for females.
