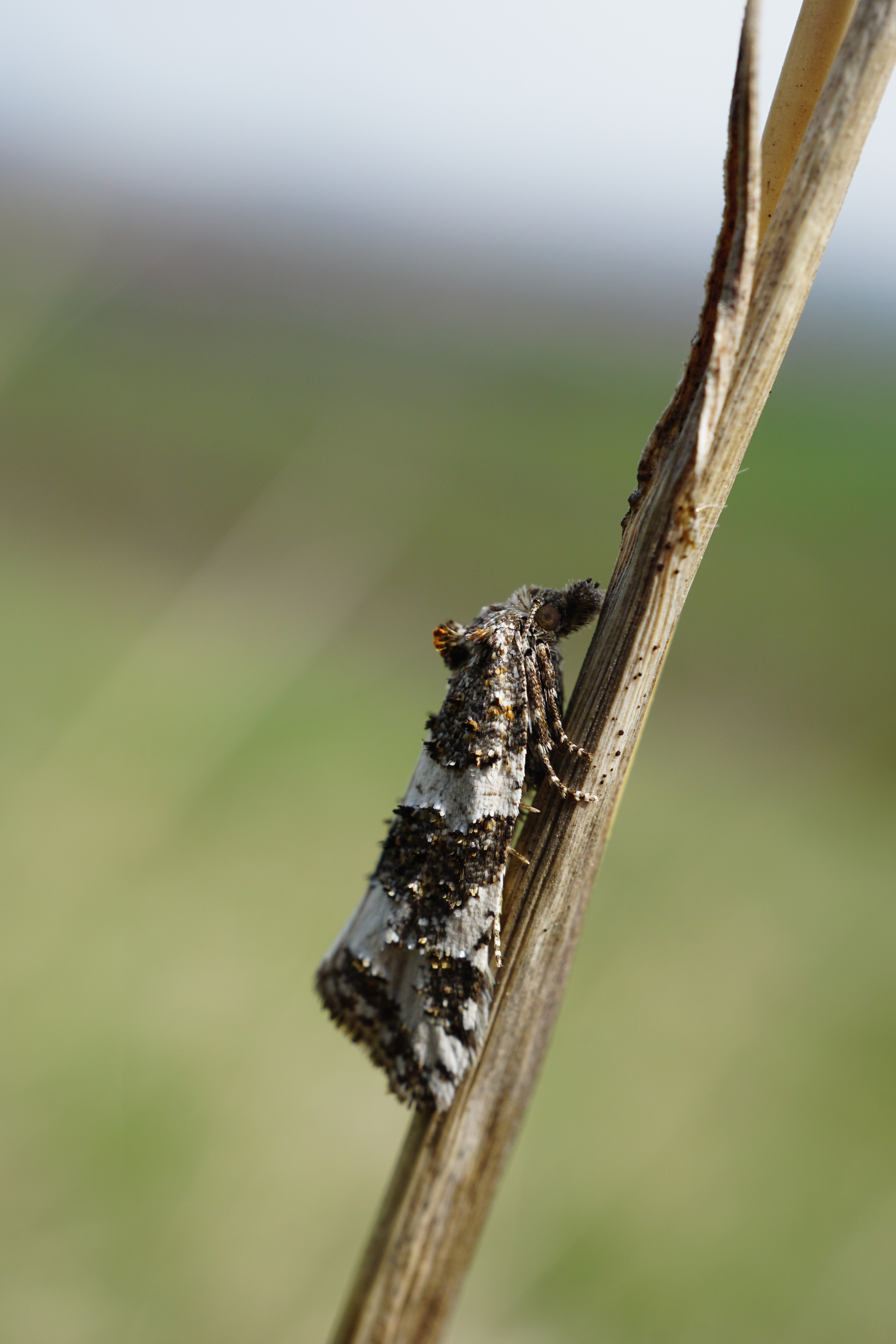
- Xerocnephasia rigana

Scientific classification
- Kingdom: Animalia
- Phylum: Arthropoda
- Class: Insecta
- Order: Lepidoptera
- Family: Tortricidae
- Subfamily: Tortricinae
- Genus: Xerocnephasia; Leraut, 1979

= Xerocnephasia =

Genus of tortrix moths

Xerocnephasia is a genus of moths belonging to the subfamily Tortricinae of the family Tortricidae.

== Species ==
- Xerocnephasia rigana (Sodoffsky, 1829)

== See also ==
- List of Tortricidae genera
