= Cochylidia contumescens =

Scientific classification
- Domain: Eukaryota
- Kingdom: Animalia
- Phylum: Arthropoda
- Class: Insecta
- Order: Lepidoptera
- Family: Tortricidae
- Genus: Cochylidia
- Species: C. contumescens

Binomial name
- Cochylidia contumescens (Meyrick, 1931)

Synonyms
- Phalonia contumescens Meyrick, 1931

Species of moth

Cochylidia contumescens is a species of moth of the family Tortricidae. It was described by Edward Meyrick in 1931. It is found in China (Anhui, Guangxi, Henan, Tianjin), Korea, Japan and Russia.

The wingspan is 9−20 mm.
