= Stenopteron =

Scientific classification
- Kingdom: Animalia
- Phylum: Arthropoda
- Class: Insecta
- Order: Lepidoptera
- Family: Tortricidae
- Subfamily: Tortricinae
- Genus: Stenopteron; Razowski, 1988

Genus of tortrix moths

Stenopteron is a genus of moths belonging to the family Tortricidae.

== Species ==
- Stenopteron stenoptera (Filipjev, 1962)

== See also ==
- List of Tortricidae genera
