= Decodina =

Scientific classification
- Kingdom: Animalia
- Phylum: Arthropoda
- Clade: Pancrustacea
- Class: Insecta
- Order: Lepidoptera
- Family: Tortricidae
- Subfamily: Tortricinae
- Genus: Decodina; Powell, 1980

Genus of tortrix moths

Decodina is a genus of moths belonging to the family Tortricidae.

== Species ==
- Decodina mazatlana Powell, 1980

== See also ==
- List of Tortricidae genera
