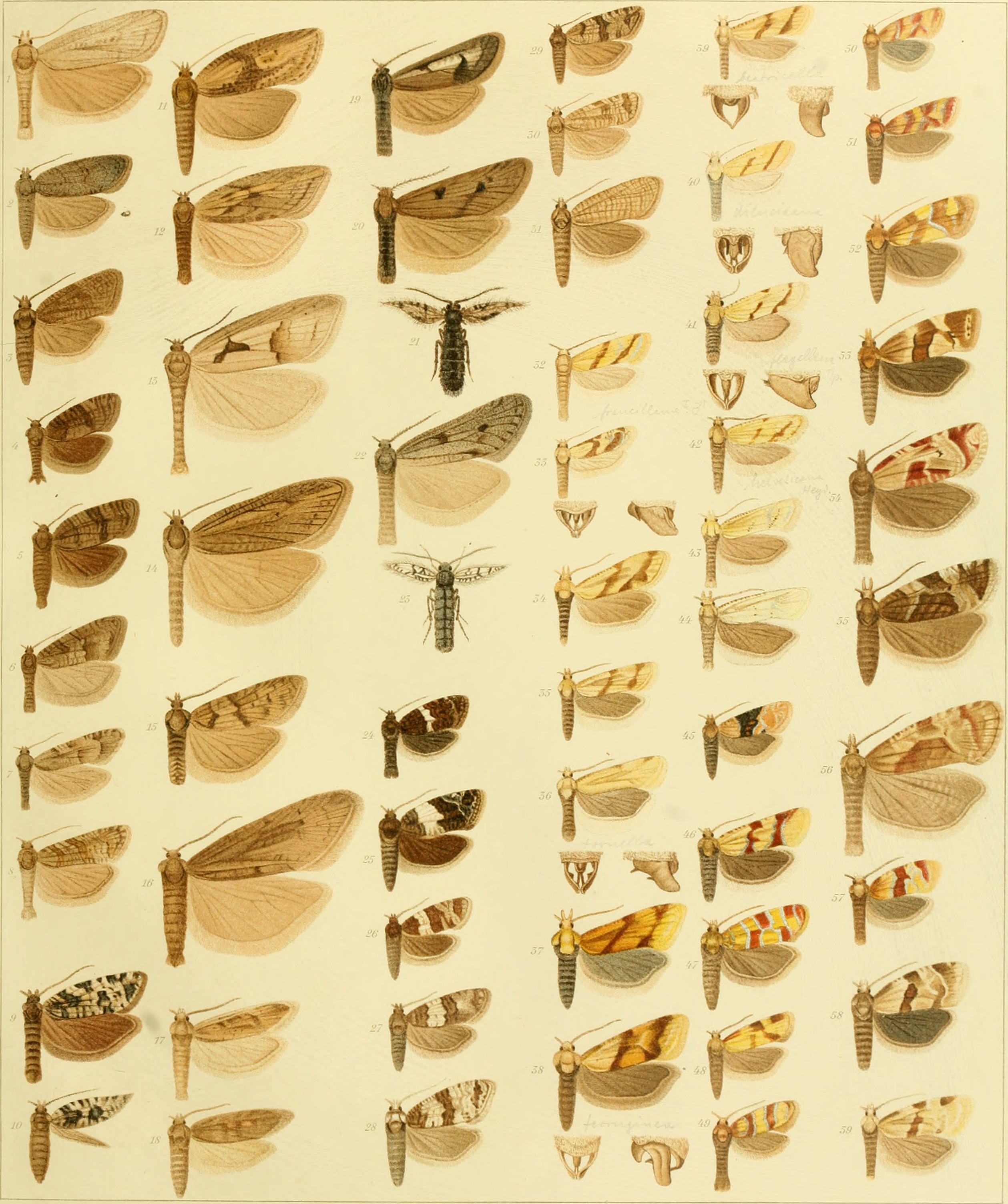
- Oxypteron impar in Die palaearktischen tortriciden figure 17 male, 18 female

Scientific classification
- Kingdom: Animalia
- Phylum: Arthropoda
- Class: Insecta
- Order: Lepidoptera
- Family: Tortricidae
- Subfamily: Tortricinae
- Genus: Oxypteron; Staudinger, 1871

= Oxypteron =

Genus of tortrix moths

Oxypteron is a Palearctic genus of moths belonging to the subfamily Tortricinae of the family Tortricidae.

== Species ==
- Oxypteron algerianum Razowski, 1965 Algeria
- Oxypteron eremica (Walsingham, 1907) Algeria
- Oxypteron exiguana (Laharpe, 1860) Sicily, Southwest Europe
- Oxypteron homsana Amsel, 1954 Syria
- Oxypteron impar Staudinger, 1871 SudRussland, Transkaspasien
- Oxypteron kruegeri (Turati, 1924) Cyrenaica (Libya)
- Oxypteron palmoni (Amsel, 1940) Palestine
- Oxypteron polita (Walsingham, 1907) Southwest Europe
- Oxypteron schawerdai (Rebel, 1936) Southwest Europe
- Oxypteron wertheimsteini (Rebel, in Rothschild, 1913) Hungary

== See also ==
- List of Tortricidae genera
