= Archicnephasia =

Scientific classification
- Kingdom: Animalia
- Phylum: Arthropoda
- Class: Insecta
- Order: Lepidoptera
- Family: Tortricidae
- Genus: Archicnephasia; Razowski, 1983
- Species: A. hartigi

Binomial name
- Archicnephasia hartigi Razowski, 1983

Genus of tortrix moths

Archicnephasia is a genus of moths belonging to the subfamily Tortricinae of the family Tortricidae. It contains only one species, Archicnephasia hartigi, which is found in Italy.

The wingspan is 23–24 millimetres (0.91–0.94 in). Adults are on wing in late autumn.

== Etymology ==
The species is named for Friedrich Reichsgraf von Hartig.

== See also ==
- List of Tortricidae genera
