= Drachmobola =

Scientific classification
- Kingdom: Animalia
- Phylum: Arthropoda
- Class: Insecta
- Order: Lepidoptera
- Family: Tortricidae
- Subfamily: Tortricinae
- Genus: Drachmobola; Meyrick, 1907

Genus of tortrix moths

Drachmobola is a genus of moths belonging to the subfamily Tortricinae of the family Tortricidae.

The description of Meyrick for this genus is:

The antennae of the male are shortly ciliated, palpi moderate, porrected, second joint rough-scaled above and beneath. Forewings with tufts of scales on surface and dorsal projection tufts; 7 to termen, 8 and 9 cut 7. Hindwings with 3 and 4 connate, 5 approximated, 6 and 7 stalked.

== Species ==
- Drachmobola dentiuncana Kuznetzov, 2003
- Drachmobola insignitana (Moschler, 1891)
- Drachmobola lobigera Diakonoff, 1975
- Drachmobola periastra Meyrick, 1907
- Drachmobola strigulata Meyrick, 1910

== See also ==
- List of Tortricidae genera
