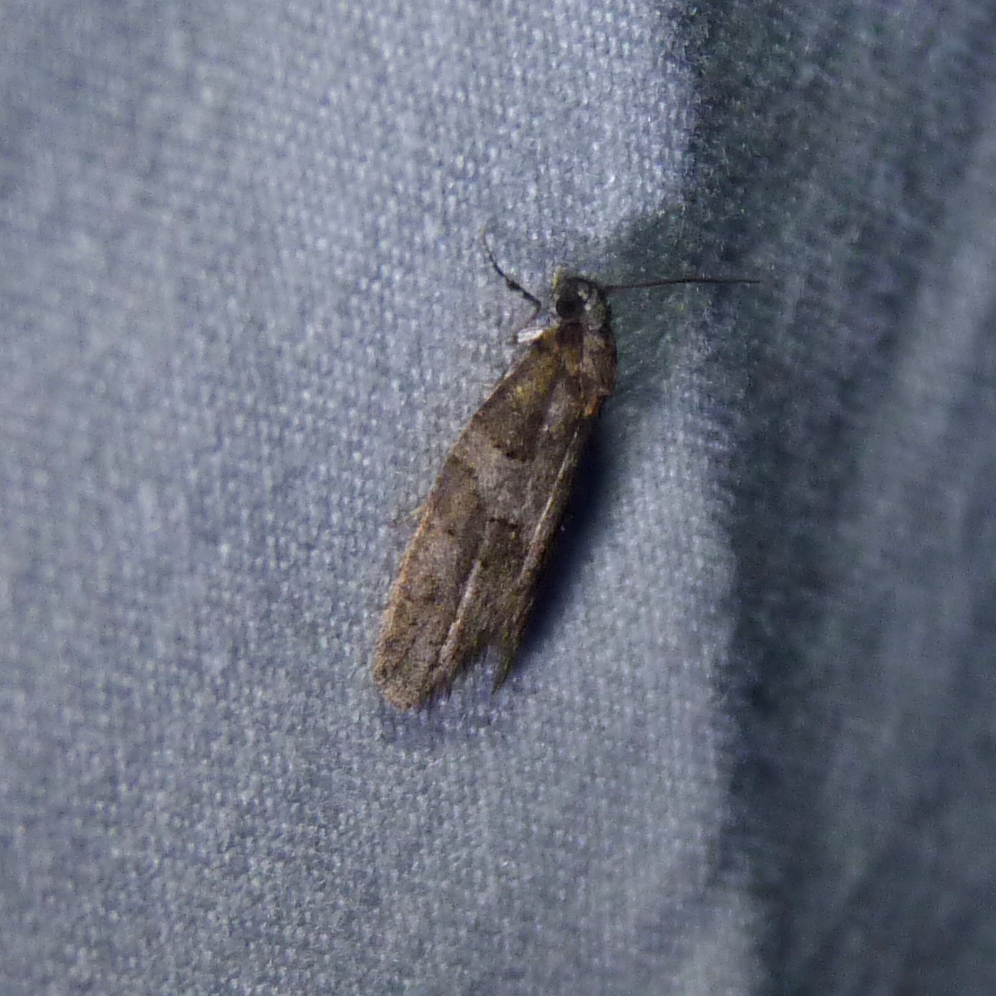
- Decodes basiplagana

Scientific classification
- Domain: Eukaryota
- Kingdom: Animalia
- Phylum: Arthropoda
- Class: Insecta
- Order: Lepidoptera
- Family: Tortricidae
- Subfamily: Tortricinae
- Genus: Decodes; Obraztsov, 1961

= Decodes =

Genus of tortrix moths

Decodes is a genus of moths in the family Tortricidae.

== Species ==
- Decodes aneuretus Powell, in Obraztsov & Powell, 1961
- Decodes asapheus Powell, 1980
- Decodes australus Powell, 1965
- Decodes basiplagana (Walsingham, 1879)
- Decodes bicolor Powell, in Obraztsov & Powell, 1961
- Decodes catherinae Powell, 1980
- Decodes fragariana (Busck, 1919)
- Decodes helix Powell & Brown, 1998
- Decodes horariana (Walsingham, 1879)
- Decodes johnstoni Powell, in Obraztsov & Powell, 1961
- Decodes lundgreni Powell, 1980
- Decodes macdunnoughi Powell, 1980
- Decodes macswaini Powell, 1980
- Decodes montanus Powell, in Obraztsov & Powell, 1961
- Decodes opleri Powell, 1980
- Decodes placita (Walsingham, 1914)
- Decodes stevensi Powell, 1980
- Decodes tahoense Powell, 1980
- Decodes tonto Powell, 1980
- Decodes zimapanus Powell, 1980

== See also ==
- List of Tortricidae genera
