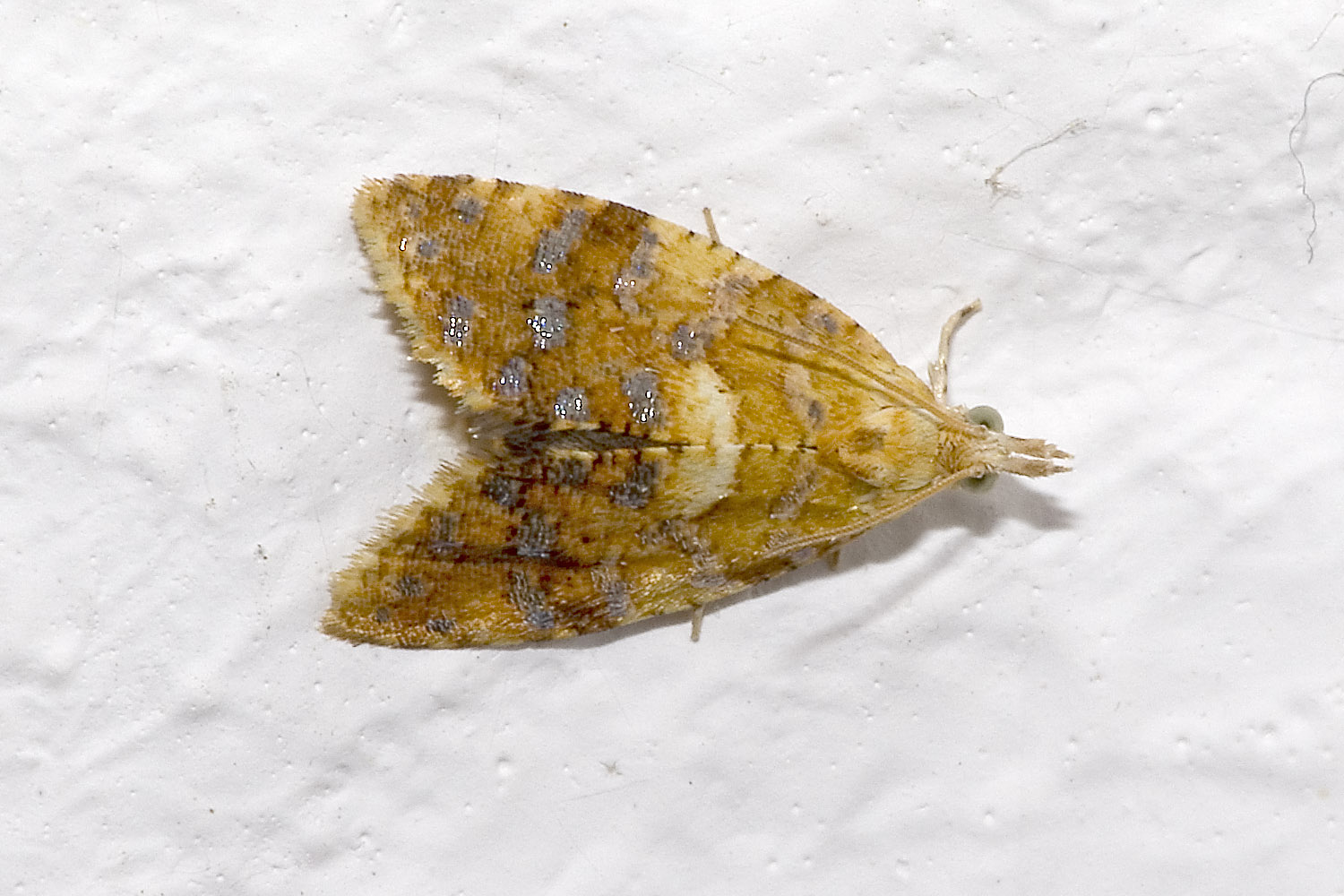
- Pseudargyrotoza conwagana

Scientific classification
- Domain: Eukaryota
- Kingdom: Animalia
- Phylum: Arthropoda
- Class: Insecta
- Order: Lepidoptera
- Family: Tortricidae
- Subfamily: Tortricinae
- Genus: Pseudargyrotoza; Obraztsov, 1954

= Pseudargyrotoza =

Genus of tortrix moths

Pseudargyrotoza is a genus of moths belonging to the subfamily Tortricinae of the family Tortricidae.

== Species ==
- Pseudargyrotoza conwagana (Fabricius, 1775)

Some schemes also list "Pseudargyrotoza leucophracta" (Meyrick in Caradja & Meyrick, 1937) but seems unsubstantiated.

== See also ==
- List of Tortricidae genera
