= List of moths of Italy (Q-Z) =

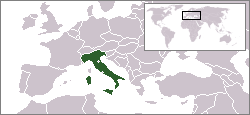
Location of Italy

Italian moths represent about 4,959 different types of moths. The moths (mostly nocturnal) and butterflies (mostly diurnal) together make up the taxonomic order Lepidoptera.

This is a list of moth species (families beginning Q-Z) which have been recorded in Italy, including San Marino, Sardinia, Sicily and Vatican City. Other parts of the list are at List of moths of Italy.

== Roeslerstammiidae ==
- Roeslerstammia erxlebella (Fabricius, 1787)

== Saturniidae ==
- Aglia tau (Linnaeus, 1758)
- Antheraea yamamai (Guerin-Meneville, 1861)
- Samia cynthia (Drury, 1773)
- Saturnia pavoniella (Scopoli, 1763)
- Saturnia pyri (Denis & Schiffermuller, 1775)

== Schreckensteiniidae ==
- Schreckensteinia festaliella (Hübner, 1819)

== Scythrididae ==
- Enolmis acanthella (Godart, 1824)
- Enolmis agenjoi Passerin d'Entreves, 1988
- Episcythris triangulella (Ragonot, 1874)
- Eretmocera medinella (Staudinger, 1859)
- Scythris acarioides Bengtsson, 1997
- Scythris adustella Jackh, 1978
- Scythris aerariella (Herrich-Schäffer, 1855)
- Scythris alseriella (Turati, 1879)
- Scythris amphonycella (Geyer, 1836)
- Scythris arerai Huemer, 2000
- Scythris aspromontis Jackh, 1978
- Scythris baldensis Passerin d'Entreves, 1979
- Scythris bolognella Jackh, 1978
- Scythris bubaniae Walsingham, 1907
- Scythris carboniella Jackh, 1978
- Scythris cistorum (Milliere, 1876)
- Scythris clavella (Zeller, 1855)
- Scythris constanti Walsingham, 1898
- Scythris crassiuscula (Herrich-Schäffer, 1855)
- Scythris crypta Hannemann, 1961
- Scythris cuspidella (Denis & Schiffermuller, 1775)
- Scythris derrai Bengtsson, 1991
- Scythris dissimilella (Herrich-Schäffer, 1855)
- Scythris dissitella (Zeller, 1847)
- Scythris fallacella (Schlager, 1847)
- Scythris flavilaterella (Fuchs, 1886)
- Scythris flaviventrella (Herrich-Schäffer, 1855)
- Scythris fuscoaenea (Haworth, 1828)
- Scythris glacialis (Frey, 1870)
- Scythris gravatella (Zeller, 1847)
- Scythris heinemanni (Moschler, 1869)
- Scythris hornigii (Zeller, 1855)
- Scythris imperiella Jackh, 1978
- Scythris inertella (Zeller, 1855)
- Scythris inspersella (Hübner, 1817)
- Scythris lagunae Jackh, 1978
- Scythris laminella (Denis & Schiffermuller, 1775)
- Scythris limbella (Fabricius, 1775)
- Scythris mediella (Constant, 1855)
- Scythris mus Walsingham, 1898
- Scythris nigrella Jackh, 1978
- Scythris noricella (Zeller, 1843)
- Scythris obscurella (Scopoli, 1763)
- Scythris pascuella (Zeller, 1855)
- Scythris picaepennis (Haworth, 1828)
- Scythris productella (Zeller, 1839)
- Scythris punctivittella (O. Costa, 1836)
- Scythris ridiculella Caradja, 1920
- Scythris sappadensis Bengtsson, 1992
- Scythris scopolella (Linnaeus, 1767)
- Scythris seliniella (Zeller, 1839)
- Scythris siccella (Zeller, 1839)
- Scythris siculella Jackh, 1977
- Scythris speyeri (Heinemann & Wocke, 1876)
- Scythris subseliniella (Heinemann, 1876)
- Scythris tabidella (Herrich-Schäffer, 1855)
- Scythris tauromeniella Passerin d'Entreves & Roggero, 2004
- Scythris tenuivittella (Stainton, 1867)
- Scythris tergestinella (Zeller, 1855)
- Scythris tremalzoi Bengtsson, 1992
- Scythris tributella (Zeller, 1847)
- Scythris trinacriae Passerin d'Entreves, 1984
- Scythris villari Agenjo, 1971
- Scythris vittella (O. Costa, 1834)

== Sesiidae ==
- Bembecia albanensis (Rebel, 1918)
- Bembecia flavida (Oberthur, 1890)
- Bembecia himmighoffeni (Staudinger, 1866)
- Bembecia hymenopteriformis (Bellier, 1860)
- Bembecia iberica Spatenka, 1992
- Bembecia ichneumoniformis (Denis & Schiffermuller, 1775)
- Bembecia psoraleae Bartsch & Bettag, 1997
- Bembecia scopigera (Scopoli, 1763)
- Bembecia sirphiformis (Lucas, 1849)
- Bembecia tunetana (Le Cerf, 1920)
- Bembecia uroceriformis (Treitschke, 1834)
- Chamaesphecia aerifrons (Zeller, 1847)
- Chamaesphecia anthraciformis (Rambur, 1832)
- Chamaesphecia bibioniformis (Esper, 1800)
- Chamaesphecia chalciformis (Esper, 1804)
- Chamaesphecia doleriformis (Herrich-Schäffer, 1846)
- Chamaesphecia dumonti Le Cerf, 1922
- Chamaesphecia empiformis (Esper, 1783)
- Chamaesphecia euceraeformis (Ochsenheimer, 1816)
- Chamaesphecia leucopsiformis (Esper, 1800)
- Chamaesphecia masariformis (Ochsenheimer, 1808)
- Chamaesphecia maurusia Pungeler, 1912
- Chamaesphecia mysiniformis (Boisduval, 1840)
- Chamaesphecia osmiaeformis (Herrich-Schäffer, 1848)
- Chamaesphecia palustris Kautz, 1927
- Chamaesphecia schmidtiiformis (Freyer, 1836)
- Chamaesphecia staudingeri (Failla-Tedaldi, 1890)
- Chamaesphecia thracica Z. Lastuvka, 1983
- Paranthrene insolitus Le Cerf, 1914
- Paranthrene tabaniformis (Rottemburg, 1775)
- Pennisetia hylaeiformis (Laspeyres, 1801)
- Pyropteron affinis (Staudinger, 1856)
- Pyropteron chrysidiformis (Esper, 1782)
- Pyropteron doryliformis (Ochsenheimer, 1808)
- Pyropteron leucomelaena (Zeller, 1847)
- Pyropteron meriaeformis (Boisduval, 1840)
- Pyropteron muscaeformis (Esper, 1783)
- Pyropteron triannuliformis (Freyer, 1843)
- Sesia apiformis (Clerck, 1759)
- Sesia bembeciformis (Hübner, 1806)
- Sesia melanocephala Dalman, 1816
- Synanthedon andrenaeformis (Laspeyres, 1801)
- Synanthedon cephiformis (Ochsenheimer, 1808)
- Synanthedon codeti (Oberthur, 1881)
- Synanthedon conopiformis (Esper, 1782)
- Synanthedon culiciformis (Linnaeus, 1758)
- Synanthedon flaviventris (Staudinger, 1883)
- Synanthedon formicaeformis (Esper, 1783)
- Synanthedon loranthi (Kralicek, 1966)
- Synanthedon melliniformis (Laspeyres, 1801)
- Synanthedon myopaeformis (Borkhausen, 1789)
- Synanthedon polaris (Staudinger, 1877)
- Synanthedon scoliaeformis (Borkhausen, 1789)
- Synanthedon spheciformis (Denis & Schiffermuller, 1775)
- Synanthedon spuleri (Fuchs, 1908)
- Synanthedon stomoxiformis (Hübner, 1790)
- Synanthedon tipuliformis (Clerck, 1759)
- Synanthedon vespiformis (Linnaeus, 1761)
- Tinthia tineiformis (Esper, 1789)

== Somabrachyidae ==
- Somabrachys aegrota (Klug, 1830)

== Sphingidae ==
- Acherontia atropos (Linnaeus, 1758)
- Agrius convolvuli (Linnaeus, 1758)
- Daphnis nerii (Linnaeus, 1758)
- Deilephila elpenor (Linnaeus, 1758)
- Deilephila porcellus (Linnaeus, 1758)
- Hemaris croatica (Esper, 1800)
- Hemaris fuciformis (Linnaeus, 1758)
- Hemaris tityus (Linnaeus, 1758)
- Hippotion celerio (Linnaeus, 1758)
- Hyles dahlii (Geyer, 1828)
- Hyles euphorbiae (Linnaeus, 1758)
- Hyles gallii (Rottemburg, 1775)
- Hyles hippophaes (Esper, 1789)
- Hyles livornica (Esper, 1780)
- Hyles nicaea (de Prunner, 1798)
- Hyles vespertilio (Esper, 1780)
- Laothoe populi (Linnaeus, 1758)
- Macroglossum stellatarum (Linnaeus, 1758)
- Marumba quercus (Denis & Schiffermuller, 1775)
- Mimas tiliae (Linnaeus, 1758)
- Proserpinus proserpina (Pallas, 1772)
- Smerinthus ocellata (Linnaeus, 1758)
- Sphinx ligustri Linnaeus, 1758
- Sphinx pinastri Linnaeus, 1758

== Stathmopodidae ==
- Neomariania partinicensis (Rebel, 1937)
- Stathmopoda pedella (Linnaeus, 1761)

== Thyrididae ==
- Thyris fenestrella (Scopoli, 1763)

== Tineidae ==
- Agnathosia mendicella (Denis & Schiffermuller, 1775)
- Anomalotinea gardesanella (Hartig, 1950)
- Anomalotinea liguriella (Milliere, 1879)
- Archinemapogon yildizae Kocak, 1981
- Ateliotum hungaricellum Zeller, 1839
- Ateliotum insulare (Rebel, 1896)
- Ateliotum petrinella (Herrich-Schäffer, 1854)
- Cephimallota angusticostella (Zeller, 1839)
- Cephimallota crassiflavella Bruand, 1851
- Crassicornella crassicornella (Zeller, 1847)
- Dryadaula heindeli Gaedike & Scholz, 1998
- Elatobia fuliginosella (Lienig & Zeller, 1846)
- Eudarcia brachyptera (Passerin d'Entreves, 1974)
- Eudarcia leopoldella (O. G. Costa, 1836)
- Eudarcia nerviella (Amsel, 1954)
- Eudarcia nigraella (Mariani, 1937)
- Eudarcia pagenstecherella (Hübner, 1825)
- Eudarcia palanfreella Baldizzone & Gaedike, 2004
- Eudarcia sardoa (Passerin d'Entreves, 1978)
- Eudarcia vacriensis (Parenti, 1964)
- Eudarcia aureliani (Capuse, 1967)
- Eudarcia confusella (Heydenreich, 1851)
- Eudarcia derrai (Gaedike, 1983)
- Eudarcia granulatella (Zeller, 1852)
- Eudarcia hedemanni (Rebel, 1899)
- Eudarcia romanum (Petersen, 1968)
- Euplocamus anthracinalis (Scopoli, 1763)
- Haplotinea ditella (Pierce & Metcalfe, 1938)
- Haplotinea insectella (Fabricius, 1794)
- Infurcitinea albicomella (Stainton, 1851)
- Infurcitinea argentimaculella (Stainton, 1849)
- Infurcitinea atrifasciella (Staudinger, 1871)
- Infurcitinea belviella Gaedike, 1980
- Infurcitinea captans Gozmany, 1960
- Infurcitinea finalis Gozmany, 1959
- Infurcitinea ignicomella (Zeller, 1852)
- Infurcitinea italica (Amsel, 1954)
- Infurcitinea klimeschi Passerin d'Entreves, 1974
- Infurcitinea parentii Petersen, 1964
- Infurcitinea roesslerella (Heyden, 1865)
- Infurcitinea rumelicella (Rebel, 1903)
- Infurcitinea sardica (Amsel, 1952)
- Infurcitinea sardiniella Vari, 1942
- Infurcitinea siciliana Petersen, 1964
- Infurcitinea teriolella (Amsel, 1954)
- Infurcitinea yildizae Kocak, 1981
- Karsholtia marianii (Rebel, 1936)
- Lichenotinea maculata Petersen, 1957
- Lichenotinea pustulatella (Zeller, 1852)
- Monopis crocicapitella (Clemens, 1859)
- Monopis imella (Hübner, 1813)
- Monopis laevigella (Denis & Schiffermuller, 1775)
- Monopis monachella (Hübner, 1796)
- Monopis nigricantella (Milliere, 1872)
- Monopis obviella (Denis & Schiffermuller, 1775)
- Monopis weaverella (Scott, 1858)
- Montescardia tessulatellus (Zeller, 1846)
- Montetinea montana Petersen, 1957
- Montetinea tenuicornella (Klimesch, 1942)
- Morophaga choragella (Denis & Schiffermuller, 1775)
- Morophaga morella (Duponchel, 1838)
- Myrmecozela ataxella (Chretien, 1905)
- Myrmecozela ochraceella (Tengstrom, 1848)
- Nemapogon agenjoi Petersen, 1959
- Nemapogon arcosuensis Gaedike, 2007
- Nemapogon clematella (Fabricius, 1781)
- Nemapogon cloacella (Haworth, 1828)
- Nemapogon granella (Linnaeus, 1758)
- Nemapogon gravosaellus Petersen, 1957
- Nemapogon hungaricus Gozmany, 1960
- Nemapogon inconditella (Lucas, 1956)
- Nemapogon nevadella (Caradja, 1920)
- Nemapogon picarella (Clerck, 1759)
- Nemapogon ruricolella (Stainton, 1849)
- Nemapogon sardicus Gaedike, 1983
- Nemapogon signatellus Petersen, 1957
- Nemapogon similella Gaedike, 2007
- Nemapogon somchetiella Zagulajev, 1961
- Nemapogon variatella (Clemens, 1859)
- Nemapogon wolffiella Karsholt & Nielsen, 1976
- Nemaxera betulinella (Fabricius, 1787)
- Neurothaumasia ankerella (Mann, 1867)
- Neurothaumasia ragusaella (Wocke, 1889)
- Niditinea fuscella (Linnaeus, 1758)
- Niditinea striolella (Matsumura, 1931)
- Niditinea truncicolella (Tengstrom, 1848)
- Novotinea carbonifera (Walsingham, 1900)
- Novotinea liguriella Amsel, 1950
- Novotinea mistrettae Parenti, 1966
- Opogona omoscopa (Meyrick, 1893)
- Phereoeca allutella (Rebel, 1892)
- Proterospastis merdella (Zeller, 1847)
- Reisserita panormitanella (Mann, 1859)
- Reisserita relicinella (Herrich-Schäffer, 1853)
- Rhodobates unicolor (Staudinger, 1870)
- Scardia boletella (Fabricius, 1794)
- Stenoptinea cyaneimarmorella (Milliere, 1854)
- Tenaga nigripunctella (Haworth, 1828)
- Tenaga rhenania (Petersen, 1962)
- Tinea basifasciella Ragonot, 1895
- Tinea columbariella Wocke, 1877
- Tinea dubiella Stainton, 1859
- Tinea flavescentella Haworth, 1828
- Tinea messalina Robinson, 1979
- Tinea murariella Staudinger, 1859
- Tinea nonimella (Zagulajev, 1955)
- Tinea pallescentella Stainton, 1851
- Tinea pellionella Linnaeus, 1758
- Tinea semifulvella Haworth, 1828
- Tinea translucens Meyrick, 1917
- Tinea trinotella Thunberg, 1794
- Tineola bisselliella (Hummel, 1823)
- Triaxomasia caprimulgella (Stainton, 1851)
- Triaxomera baldensis Petersen, 1983
- Triaxomera marsica Petersen, 1984
- Triaxomera parasitella (Hübner, 1796)
- Trichophaga bipartitella (Ragonot, 1892)
- Trichophaga tapetzella (Linnaeus, 1758)

== Tischeriidae ==
- Coptotriche angusticollella (Duponchel, 1843)
- Coptotriche gaunacella (Duponchel, 1843)
- Coptotriche heinemanni (Wocke, 1871)
- Coptotriche marginea (Haworth, 1828)
- Tischeria decidua Wocke, 1876
- Tischeria dodonaea Stainton, 1858
- Tischeria ekebladella (Bjerkander, 1795)

== Tortricidae ==
- Acleris abietana (Hübner, 1822)
- Acleris aspersana (Hübner, 1817)
- Acleris bergmanniana (Linnaeus, 1758)
- Acleris comariana (Lienig & Zeller, 1846)
- Acleris cristana (Denis & Schiffermuller, 1775)
- Acleris emargana (Fabricius, 1775)
- Acleris ferrugana (Denis & Schiffermuller, 1775)
- Acleris fimbriana (Thunberg, 1791)
- Acleris forsskaleana (Linnaeus, 1758)
- Acleris hastiana (Linnaeus, 1758)
- Acleris hippophaeana (Heyden, 1865)
- Acleris holmiana (Linnaeus, 1758)
- Acleris hyemana (Haworth, 1811)
- Acleris kochiella (Goeze, 1783)
- Acleris lacordairana (Duponchel, 1836)
- Acleris laterana (Fabricius, 1794)
- Acleris lipsiana (Denis & Schiffermuller, 1775)
- Acleris literana (Linnaeus, 1758)
- Acleris logiana (Clerck, 1759)
- Acleris notana (Donovan, 1806)
- Acleris permutana (Duponchel, 1836)
- Acleris quercinana (Zeller, 1849)
- Acleris rhombana (Denis & Schiffermuller, 1775)
- Acleris roscidana (Hübner, 1799)
- Acleris rufana (Denis & Schiffermuller, 1775)
- Acleris schalleriana (Linnaeus, 1761)
- Acleris shepherdana (Stephens, 1852)
- Acleris sparsana (Denis & Schiffermuller, 1775)
- Acleris umbrana (Hübner, 1799)
- Acleris variegana (Denis & Schiffermuller, 1775)
- Acroclita subsequana (Herrich-Schäffer, 1851)
- Adoxophyes orana (Fischer v. Röslerstamm, 1834)
- Aethes ardezana (Muller-Rutz, 1922)
- Aethes aurofasciana (Mann, 1855)
- Aethes beatricella (Walsingham, 1898)
- Aethes bilbaensis (Rossler, 1877)
- Aethes caucasica (Amsel, 1959)
- Aethes cnicana (Westwood, 1854)
- Aethes deaurana (Peyerimhoff, 1877)
- Aethes decimana (Denis & Schiffermuller, 1775)
- Aethes deutschiana (Zetterstedt, 1839)
- Aethes dilucidana (Stephens, 1852)
- Aethes flagellana (Duponchel, 1836)
- Aethes francillana (Fabricius, 1794)
- Aethes hartmanniana (Clerck, 1759)
- Aethes kasyi Razowski, 1962
- Aethes kindermanniana (Treitschke, 1830)
- Aethes languidana (Mann, 1855)
- Aethes margaritana (Haworth, 1811)
- Aethes margarotana (Duponchel, 1836)
- Aethes mauritanica (Walsingham, 1898)
- Aethes moribundana (Staudinger, 1859)
- Aethes piercei Obraztsov, 1952
- Aethes rubigana (Treitschke, 1830)
- Aethes rubiginana (Walsingham, 1903)
- Aethes rutilana (Hübner, 1817)
- Aethes sanguinana (Treitschke, 1830)
- Aethes scalana (Zerny, 1927)
- Aethes smeathmanniana (Fabricius, 1781)
- Aethes tesserana (Denis & Schiffermuller, 1775)
- Aethes tornella (Walsingham, 1898)
- Aethes vicinana (Mann, 1859)
- Aethes williana (Brahm, 1791)
- Agapeta hamana (Linnaeus, 1758)
- Agapeta zoegana (Linnaeus, 1767)
- Aleimma loeflingiana (Linnaeus, 1758)
- Ancylis achatana (Denis & Schiffermuller, 1775)
- Ancylis apicella (Denis & Schiffermuller, 1775)
- Ancylis badiana (Denis & Schiffermuller, 1775)
- Ancylis comptana (Frolich, 1828)
- Ancylis geminana (Donovan, 1806)
- Ancylis laetana (Fabricius, 1775)
- Ancylis mitterbacheriana (Denis & Schiffermuller, 1775)
- Ancylis myrtillana (Treitschke, 1830)
- Ancylis obtusana (Haworth, 1811)
- Ancylis paludana Barrett, 1871
- Ancylis selenana (Guenee, 1845)
- Ancylis tineana (Hübner, 1799)
- Ancylis uncella (Denis & Schiffermuller, 1775)
- Ancylis unculana (Haworth, 1811)
- Ancylis unguicella (Linnaeus, 1758)
- Ancylis upupana (Treitschke, 1835)
- Aneuxanthis locupletana (Hübner, 1819)
- Aphelia viburniana (Denis & Schiffermuller, 1775)
- Aphelia ferugana (Hübner, 1793)
- Aphelia paleana (Hübner, 1793)
- Aphelia peramplana (Hübner, 1825)
- Aphelia unitana (Hübner, 1799)
- Apotomis betuletana (Haworth, 1811)
- Apotomis capreana (Hübner, 1817)
- Apotomis infida (Heinrich, 1926)
- Apotomis inundana (Denis & Schiffermuller, 1775)
- Apotomis lineana (Denis & Schiffermuller, 1775)
- Apotomis sauciana (Frolich, 1828)
- Apotomis semifasciana (Haworth, 1811)
- Apotomis sororculana (Zetterstedt, 1839)
- Apotomis turbidana Hübner, 1825
- Archicnephasia hartigi Razowski, 1983
- Archips betulana (Hübner, 1787)
- Archips crataegana (Hübner, 1799)
- Archips oporana (Linnaeus, 1758)
- Archips podana (Scopoli, 1763)
- Archips rosana (Linnaeus, 1758)
- Archips xylosteana (Linnaeus, 1758)
- Argyroploce arbutella (Linnaeus, 1758)
- Argyroploce noricana (Herrich-Schäffer, 1851)
- Argyroploce roseomaculana (Herrich-Schäffer, 1851)
- Argyrotaenia ljungiana (Thunberg, 1797)
- Aterpia anderreggana Guenee, 1845
- Aterpia circumfluxana (Christoph, 1881)
- Aterpia corticana (Denis & Schiffermuller, 1775)
- Avaria hyerana (Milliere, 1858)
- Bactra bactrana (Kennel, 1901)
- Bactra furfurana (Haworth, 1811)
- Bactra lancealana (Hübner, 1799)
- Bactra robustana (Christoph, 1872)
- Bactra venosana (Zeller, 1847)
- Cacoecimorpha pronubana (Hübner, 1799)
- Capricornia boisduvaliana (Duponchel, 1836)
- Capua vulgana (Frolich, 1828)
- Celypha aurofasciana (Haworth, 1811)
- Celypha cespitana (Hübner, 1817)
- Celypha doubledayana (Barrett, 1872)
- Celypha flavipalpana (Herrich-Schäffer, 1851)
- Celypha lacunana (Denis & Schiffermuller, 1775)
- Celypha rivulana (Scopoli, 1763)
- Celypha rosaceana Schlager, 1847
- Celypha rufana (Scopoli, 1763)
- Celypha rurestrana (Duponchel, 1843)
- Celypha siderana (Treitschke, 1835)
- Celypha striana (Denis & Schiffermuller, 1775)
- Celypha woodiana (Barrett, 1882)
- Choristoneura diversana (Hübner, 1817)
- Choristoneura hebenstreitella (Muller, 1764)
- Choristoneura lafauryana (Ragonot, 1875)
- Choristoneura murinana (Hübner, 1799)
- Clavigesta sylvestrana (Curtis, 1850)
- Clepsis consimilana (Hübner, 1817)
- Clepsis dumicolana (Zeller, 1847)
- Clepsis lindebergi (Krogerus, 1952)
- Clepsis neglectana (Herrich-Schäffer, 1851)
- Clepsis pallidana (Fabricius, 1776)
- Clepsis rogana (Guenee, 1845)
- Clepsis rolandriana (Linnaeus, 1758)
- Clepsis rurinana (Linnaeus, 1758)
- Clepsis senecionana (Hübner, 1819)
- Clepsis siciliana (Ragonot, 1894)
- Clepsis spectrana (Treitschke, 1830)
- Clepsis steineriana (Hübner, 1799)
- Clepsis unicolorana (Duponchel, 1835)
- Cnephasia alticolana (Herrich-Schäffer, 1851)
- Cnephasia amseli (D. Lucas, 1942)
- Cnephasia asseclana (Denis & Schiffermuller, 1775)
- Cnephasia chrysantheana (Duponchel, 1843)
- Cnephasia communana (Herrich-Schäffer, 1851)
- Cnephasia conspersana Douglas, 1846
- Cnephasia cupressivorana (Staudinger, 1871)
- Cnephasia daedalea Razowski, 1983
- Cnephasia ecullyana Real, 1951
- Cnephasia fragosana (Zeller, 1847)
- Cnephasia genitalana Pierce & Metcalfe, 1922
- Cnephasia gueneeana (Duponchel, 1836)
- Cnephasia heinemanni Obraztsov, 1956
- Cnephasia hellenica Obraztsov, 1956
- Cnephasia longana (Haworth, 1811)
- Cnephasia pasiuana (Hübner, 1799)
- Cnephasia pumicana (Zeller, 1847)
- Cnephasia sedana (Constant, 1884)
- Cnephasia stephensiana (Doubleday, 1849)
- Cnephasia zangheriana Trematerra, 1991
- Cnephasia abrasana (Duponchel, 1843)
- Cnephasia etnana Razowski & Trematerral, 1999
- Cnephasia incertana (Treitschke, 1835)
- Cochylidia heydeniana (Herrich-Schäffer, 1851)
- Cochylidia implicitana (Wocke, 1856)
- Cochylidia moguntiana (Rossler, 1864)
- Cochylidia richteriana (Fischer v. Röslerstamm, 1837)
- Cochylidia rupicola (Curtis, 1834)
- Cochylidia subroseana (Haworth, 1811)
- Cochylimorpha alternana (Stephens, 1834)
- Cochylimorpha decolorella (Zeller, 1839)
- Cochylimorpha elongana (Fischer v. Röslerstamm, 1839)
- Cochylimorpha erlebachi Huemer & Trematerra, 1997
- Cochylimorpha fucosa (Razowski, 1970)
- Cochylimorpha halophilana (Christoph, 1872)
- Cochylimorpha hilarana (Herrich-Schäffer, 1851)
- Cochylimorpha jucundana (Treitschke, 1835)
- Cochylimorpha meridiana (Staudinger, 1859)
- Cochylimorpha perfusana (Guenee, 1845)
- Cochylimorpha peucedana (Ragonot, 1889)
- Cochylimorpha sparsana (Staudinger, 1879)
- Cochylimorpha straminea (Haworth, 1811)
- Cochylimorpha tiraculana (Bassi & Scaramozzino, 1989)
- Cochylimorpha woliniana (Schleich, 1868)
- Cochylis atricapitana (Stephens, 1852)
- Cochylis dubitana (Hübner, 1799)
- Cochylis epilinana Duponchel, 1842
- Cochylis flaviciliana (Westwood, 1854)
- Cochylis hybridella (Hübner, 1813)
- Cochylis molliculana Zeller, 1847
- Cochylis nana (Haworth, 1811)
- Cochylis pallidana Zeller, 1847
- Cochylis posterana Zeller, 1847
- Cochylis roseana (Haworth, 1811)
- Cochylis salebrana (Mann, 1862)
- Cochylis sannitica Trematerra, 1995
- Commophila aeneana (Hübner, 1800)
- Corticivora piniana (Herrich-Schäffer, 1851)
- Crocidosema plebejana Zeller, 1847
- Cryptocochylis conjunctana (Mann, 1864)
- Cydia adenocarpi (Ragonot, 1875)
- Cydia albipicta (Sauter, 1968)
- Cydia amplana (Hübner, 1800)
- Cydia cognatana (Barrett, 1874)
- Cydia coniferana (Saxesen, 1840)
- Cydia corollana (Hübner, 1823)
- Cydia cosmophorana (Treitschke, 1835)
- Cydia cythisanthana Burmann & Prose, 1988
- Cydia derrai Prose, 1988
- Cydia duplicana (Zetterstedt, 1839)
- Cydia exquisitana (Rebel, 1889)
- Cydia fagiglandana (Zeller, 1841)
- Cydia gilviciliana (Staudinger, 1859)
- Cydia ilipulana (Walsingham, 1903)
- Cydia illutana (Herrich-Schäffer, 1851)
- Cydia inquinatana (Hübner, 1800)
- Cydia interscindana (Moschler, 1866)
- Cydia intexta (Kuznetsov, 1962)
- Cydia johanssoni Aarvik & Karsholt, 1993
- Cydia leguminana (Lienig & Zeller, 1846)
- Cydia medicaginis (Kuznetsov, 1962)
- Cydia microgrammana (Guenee, 1845)
- Cydia millenniana (Adamczewski, 1967)
- Cydia multistriana (Chretien, 1915)
- Cydia nigricana (Fabricius, 1794)
- Cydia oxytropidis (Martini, 1912)
- Cydia pactolana (Zeller, 1840)
- Cydia plumbiferana (Staudinger, 1870)
- Cydia pomonella (Linnaeus, 1758)
- Cydia pyrivora (Danilevsky, 1947)
- Cydia semicinctana (Kennel, 1901)
- Cydia servillana (Duponchel, 1836)
- Cydia splendana (Hübner, 1799)
- Cydia strobilella (Linnaeus, 1758)
- Cydia succedana (Denis & Schiffermuller, 1775)
- Cydia trogodana Prose, 1988
- Cydia ulicetana (Haworth, 1811)
- Cydia vallesiaca (Sauter, 1968)
- Cydia zebeana (Ratzeburg, 1840)
- Cymolomia hartigiana (Saxesen, 1840)
- Diceratura ostrinana (Guenee, 1845)
- Diceratura rhodograpta Djakonov, 1929
- Diceratura roseofasciana (Mann, 1855)
- Dichelia histrionana (Frolich, 1828)
- Dichrorampha acuminatana (Lienig & Zeller, 1846)
- Dichrorampha aeratana (Pierce & Metcalfe, 1915)
- Dichrorampha agilana (Tengstrom, 1848)
- Dichrorampha alexandrae Passerin d'Entreves, 1972
- Dichrorampha alpigenana (Heinemann, 1863)
- Dichrorampha alpinana (Treitschke, 1830)
- Dichrorampha baixerasana Trematerra, 1991
- Dichrorampha bugnionana (Duponchel, 1843)
- Dichrorampha cacaleana (Herrich-Schäffer, 1851)
- Dichrorampha chavanneana (de La Harpe, 1858)
- Dichrorampha consortana Stephens, 1852
- Dichrorampha distinctana (Heinemann, 1863)
- Dichrorampha eximia (Danilevsky, 1948)
- Dichrorampha flavidorsana Knaggs, 1867
- Dichrorampha forsteri Obraztsov, 1953
- Dichrorampha gemellana (Zeller, 1847)
- Dichrorampha gruneriana (Herrich-Schäffer, 1851)
- Dichrorampha harpeana Frey, 1870
- Dichrorampha heegerana (Duponchel, 1843)
- Dichrorampha incognitana (Kremky & Maslowski, 1933)
- Dichrorampha incursana (Herrich-Schäffer, 1851)
- Dichrorampha infuscata (Danilevsky, 1960)
- Dichrorampha klimeschiana Toll, 1955
- Dichrorampha letarfensis Gibeaux, 1983
- Dichrorampha ligulana (Herrich-Schäffer, 1851)
- Dichrorampha montanana (Duponchel, 1843)
- Dichrorampha nigrobrunneana (Toll, 1942)
- Dichrorampha petiverella (Linnaeus, 1758)
- Dichrorampha plumbagana (Treitschke, 1830)
- Dichrorampha plumbana (Scopoli, 1763)
- Dichrorampha sedatana Busck, 1906
- Dichrorampha senectana Guenee, 1845
- Dichrorampha sequana (Hübner, 1799)
- Dichrorampha simpliciana (Haworth, 1811)
- Dichrorampha thomanni Huemer, 1991
- Dichrorampha vancouverana McDunnough, 1935
- Ditula angustiorana (Haworth, 1811)
- Ditula saturana (Turati, 1913)
- Doloploca punctulana (Denis & Schiffermuller, 1775)
- Eana derivana (de La Harpe, 1858)
- Eana incanana (Stephens, 1852)
- Eana italica (Obraztsov, 1950)
- Eana joannisi (Schawerda, 1929)
- Eana penziana (Thunberg, 1791)
- Eana viardi (Real, 1953)
- Eana argentana (Clerck, 1759)
- Eana osseana (Scopoli, 1763)
- Eana canescana (Guenee, 1845)
- Enarmonia formosana (Scopoli, 1763)
- Endothenia ericetana (Humphreys & Westwood, 1845)
- Endothenia gentianaeana (Hübner, 1799)
- Endothenia lapideana (Herrich-Schäffer, 1851)
- Endothenia marginana (Haworth, 1811)
- Endothenia nigricostana (Haworth, 1811)
- Endothenia oblongana (Haworth, 1811)
- Endothenia pauperculana (Staudinger, 1859)
- Endothenia quadrimaculana (Haworth, 1811)
- Endothenia sororiana (Herrich-Schäffer, 1850)
- Endothenia ustulana (Haworth, 1811)
- Epagoge grotiana (Fabricius, 1781)
- Epiblema absconditana (La Harpe, 1860)
- Epiblema chretieni Obraztsov, 1952
- Epiblema cnicicolana (Zeller, 1847)
- Epiblema costipunctana (Haworth, 1811)
- Epiblema foenella (Linnaeus, 1758)
- Epiblema grandaevana (Lienig & Zeller, 1846)
- Epiblema graphana (Treitschke, 1835)
- Epiblema hepaticana (Treitschke, 1835)
- Epiblema inulivora (Meyrick, 1932)
- Epiblema sarmatana (Christoph, 1872)
- Epiblema scutulana (Denis & Schiffermuller, 1775)
- Epiblema similana (Denis & Schiffermuller, 1775)
- Epiblema simploniana (Duponchel, 1835)
- Epiblema sticticana (Fabricius, 1794)
- Epiblema turbidana (Treitschke, 1835)
- Epichoristodes acerbella (Walker, 1864)
- Epinotia abbreviana (Fabricius, 1794)
- Epinotia bilunana (Haworth, 1811)
- Epinotia brunnichana (Linnaeus, 1767)
- Epinotia crenana (Hübner, 1799)
- Epinotia cruciana (Linnaeus, 1761)
- Epinotia dalmatana (Rebel, 1891)
- Epinotia demarniana (Fischer v. Röslerstamm, 1840)
- Epinotia festivana (Hübner, 1799)
- Epinotia fraternana (Haworth, 1811)
- Epinotia granitana (Herrich-Schäffer, 1851)
- Epinotia immundana (Fischer v. Röslerstamm, 1839)
- Epinotia kochiana (Herrich-Schäffer, 1851)
- Epinotia maculana (Fabricius, 1775)
- Epinotia mercuriana (Frolich, 1828)
- Epinotia nanana (Treitschke, 1835)
- Epinotia nemorivaga (Tengstrom, 1848)
- Epinotia nigricana (Herrich-Schäffer, 1851)
- Epinotia nisella (Clerck, 1759)
- Epinotia pygmaeana (Hübner, 1799)
- Epinotia ramella (Linnaeus, 1758)
- Epinotia rubiginosana (Herrich-Schäffer, 1851)
- Epinotia signatana (Douglas, 1845)
- Epinotia solandriana (Linnaeus, 1758)
- Epinotia sordidana (Hübner, 1824)
- Epinotia subocellana (Donovan, 1806)
- Epinotia subsequana (Haworth, 1811)
- Epinotia subuculana (Rebel, 1903)
- Epinotia tedella (Clerck, 1759)
- Epinotia tenerana (Denis & Schiffermuller, 1775)
- Epinotia tetraquetrana (Haworth, 1811)
- Epinotia thapsiana (Zeller, 1847)
- Epinotia trigonella (Linnaeus, 1758)
- Eriopsela fenestrellensis Huemer, 1991
- Eriopsela quadrana (Hübner, 1813)
- Eucosma aemulana (Schlager, 1849)
- Eucosma albidulana (Herrich-Schäffer, 1851)
- Eucosma albuneana (Zeller, 1847)
- Eucosma aspidiscana (Hübner, 1817)
- Eucosma balatonana (Osthelder, 1937)
- Eucosma campoliliana (Denis & Schiffermuller, 1775)
- Eucosma cana (Haworth, 1811)
- Eucosma conformana (Mann, 1872)
- Eucosma conterminana (Guenee, 1845)
- Eucosma fervidana (Zeller, 1847)
- Eucosma flavispecula Kuznetsov, 1964
- Eucosma gradensis (Galvagni, 1909)
- Eucosma hohenwartiana (Denis & Schiffermuller, 1775)
- Eucosma individiosana (Kennel, 1901)
- Eucosma lacteana (Treitschke, 1835)
- Eucosma lugubrana (Treitschke, 1830)
- Eucosma metzneriana (Treitschke, 1830)
- Eucosma mirificana (Peyerimhoff, 1876)
- Eucosma monstratana (Rebel, 1906)
- Eucosma obumbratana (Lienig & Zeller, 1846)
- Eucosma parvulana (Wilkinson, 1859)
- Eucosma pupillana (Clerck, 1759)
- Eucosma rubescana (Constant, 1895)
- Eucosma sardoensis (Rebel, 1935)
- Eucosma scorzonerana (Benander, 1942)
- Eucosma tripoliana (Barrett, 1880)
- Eucosma wimmerana (Treitschke, 1835)
- Eucosmomorpha albersana (Hübner, 1813)
- Eudemis porphyrana (Hübner, 1799)
- Eudemis profundana (Denis & Schiffermuller, 1775)
- Eugnosta magnificana (Rebel, 1914)
- Eulia ministrana (Linnaeus, 1758)
- Eupoecilia ambiguella (Hübner, 1796)
- Eupoecilia angustana (Hübner, 1799)
- Eupoecilia sanguisorbana (Herrich-Schäffer, 1856)
- Exapate congelatella (Clerck, 1759)
- Exapate duratella Heyden, 1864
- Falseuncaria degreyana (McLachlan, 1869)
- Falseuncaria ruficiliana (Haworth, 1811)
- Fulvoclysia nerminae Kocak, 1982
- Gibberifera simplana (Fischer v. Röslerstamm, 1836)
- Grapholita andabatana (Wolff, 1957)
- Grapholita funebrana Treitschke, 1835
- Grapholita janthinana (Duponchel, 1843)
- Grapholita lobarzewskii (Nowicki, 1860)
- Grapholita molesta (Busck, 1916)
- Grapholita tenebrosana Duponchel, 1843
- Grapholita aureolana Tengstrom, 1848
- Grapholita caecana Schlager, 1847
- Grapholita compositella (Fabricius, 1775)
- Grapholita coronillana Lienig & Zeller, 1846
- Grapholita delineana Walker, 1863
- Grapholita difficilana (Walsingham, 1900)
- Grapholita discretana Wocke, 1861
- Grapholita fissana (Frolich, 1828)
- Grapholita gemmiferana Treitschke, 1835
- Grapholita internana (Guenee, 1845)
- Grapholita jungiella (Clerck, 1759)
- Grapholita larseni Rebel, 1903
- Grapholita lathyrana (Hübner, 1822)
- Grapholita lunulana (Denis & Schiffermuller, 1775)
- Grapholita nebritana Treitschke, 1830
- Grapholita orobana Treitschke, 1830
- Grapholita pallifrontana Lienig & Zeller, 1846
- Gynnidomorpha alismana (Ragonot, 1883)
- Gynnidomorpha minimana (Caradja, 1916)
- Gynnidomorpha permixtana (Denis & Schiffermuller, 1775)
- Gynnidomorpha rubricana (Peyerimhoff, 1877)
- Gynnidomorpha vectisana (Humphreys & Westwood, 1845)
- Gypsonoma aceriana (Duponchel, 1843)
- Gypsonoma dealbana (Frolich, 1828)
- Gypsonoma imparana (Muller-Rutz, 1914)
- Gypsonoma minutana (Hübner, 1799)
- Gypsonoma nitidulana (Lienig & Zeller, 1846)
- Gypsonoma oppressana (Treitschke, 1835)
- Gypsonoma sociana (Haworth, 1811)
- Hedya dimidiana (Clerck, 1759)
- Hedya nubiferana (Haworth, 1811)
- Hedya ochroleucana (Frolich, 1828)
- Hedya pruniana (Hübner, 1799)
- Hedya salicella (Linnaeus, 1758)
- Hysterophora maculosana (Haworth, 1811)
- Isotrias huemeri Trematerra, 1993
- Isotrias hybridana (Hübner, 1817)
- Isotrias joannisana (Turati, 1921)
- Isotrias martelliana Trematerra, 1990
- Isotrias rectifasciana (Haworth, 1811)
- Isotrias stramentana (Guenee, 1845)
- Lathronympha sardinica Trematerra, 1995
- Lathronympha strigana (Fabricius, 1775)
- Lepteucosma huebneriana Kocak, 1980
- Lobesia abscisana (Doubleday, 1849)
- Lobesia artemisiana (Zeller, 1847)
- Lobesia bicinctana (Duponchel, 1844)
- Lobesia botrana (Denis & Schiffermuller, 1775)
- Lobesia indusiana (Zeller, 1847)
- Lobesia limoniana (Milliere, 1860)
- Lobesia littoralis (Westwood & Humphreys, 1845)
- Lobesia porrectana (Zeller, 1847)
- Lobesia quaggana Mann, 1855
- Lobesia reliquana (Hübner, 1825)
- Lobesia euphorbiana (Freyer, 1842)
- Lobesia occidentis Falkovitsh, 1970
- Lozotaenia cupidinana (Staudinger, 1859)
- Lozotaenia forsterana (Fabricius, 1781)
- Lozotaenia mabilliana (Ragonot, 1875)
- Lozotaenia retiana (Turati, 1913)
- Lozotaenia straminea (Schawerda, 1936)
- Lozotaeniodes cupressana (Duponchel, 1836)
- Lozotaeniodes formosana (Frolich, 1830)
- Metendothenia atropunctana (Zetterstedt, 1839)
- Neosphaleroptera nubilana (Hübner, 1799)
- Notocelia cynosbatella (Linnaeus, 1758)
- Notocelia incarnatana (Hübner, 1800)
- Notocelia mediterranea (Obraztsov, 1952)
- Notocelia roborana (Denis & Schiffermuller, 1775)
- Notocelia rosaecolana (Doubleday, 1850)
- Notocelia tetragonana (Stephens, 1834)
- Notocelia trimaculana (Haworth, 1811)
- Notocelia uddmanniana (Linnaeus, 1758)
- Olethreutes arcuella (Clerck, 1759)
- Olindia schumacherana (Fabricius, 1787)
- Orthotaenia undulana (Denis & Schiffermuller, 1775)
- Osthelderiella amardiana Obraztsov, 1961
- Oxypteron exiguana (de La Harpe, 1860)
- Oxypteron schawerdai (Rebel, 1936)
- Pammene albuginana (Guenee, 1845)
- Pammene amygdalana (Duponchel, 1842)
- Pammene argyrana (Hübner, 1799)
- Pammene aurana (Fabricius, 1775)
- Pammene aurita Razowski, 1991
- Pammene blockiana (Herrich-Schäffer, 1851)
- Pammene clanculana (Tengstrom, 1869)
- Pammene cytisana (Zeller, 1847)
- Pammene fasciana (Linnaeus, 1761)
- Pammene gallicana (Guenee, 1845)
- Pammene gallicolana (Lienig & Zeller, 1846)
- Pammene germmana (Hübner, 1799)
- Pammene giganteana (Peyerimhoff, 1863)
- Pammene insulana (Guenee, 1845)
- Pammene juniperana (Milliere, 1858)
- Pammene laserpitiana Huemer & Erlebach, 1999
- Pammene luedersiana (Sorhagen, 1885)
- Pammene obscurana (Stephens, 1834)
- Pammene ochsenheimeriana (Lienig & Zeller, 1846)
- Pammene oxycedrana (Milliere, 1876)
- Pammene populana (Fabricius, 1787)
- Pammene querceti (Gozmany, 1957)
- Pammene regiana (Zeller, 1849)
- Pammene rhediella (Clerck, 1759)
- Pammene spiniana (Duponchel, 1843)
- Pammene splendidulana (Guenee, 1845)
- Pammene suspectana (Lienig & Zeller, 1846)
- Pammene trauniana (Denis & Schiffermuller, 1775)
- Pandemis cerasana (Hübner, 1786)
- Pandemis cinnamomeana (Treitschke, 1830)
- Pandemis corylana (Fabricius, 1794)
- Pandemis dumetana (Treitschke, 1835)
- Pandemis heparana (Denis & Schiffermuller, 1775)
- Paramesia gnomana (Clerck, 1759)
- Pelatea klugiana (Freyer, 1836)
- Pelochrista agrestana (Treitschke, 1830)
- Pelochrista bleuseana (Oberthur, 1888)
- Pelochrista caecimaculana (Hübner, 1799)
- Pelochrista cannatana Trematerra, 2000
- Pelochrista decolorana (Freyer, 1842)
- Pelochrista fulvostrigana (Constant, 1888)
- Pelochrista fusculana (Zeller, 1847)
- Pelochrista griseolana (Zeller, 1847)
- Pelochrista hepatariana (Herrich-Schäffer, 1851)
- Pelochrista infidana (Hübner, 1824)
- Pelochrista latericiana (Rebel, 1919)
- Pelochrista mancipiana (Mann, 1855)
- Pelochrista modicana (Zeller, 1847)
- Pelochrista mollitana (Zeller, 1847)
- Pelochrista sordicomana (Staudinger, 1859)
- Pelochrista subtiliana (Jackh, 1960)
- Periclepsis cinctana (Denis & Schiffermuller, 1775)
- Phalonidia affinitana (Douglas, 1846)
- Phalonidia albipalpana (Zeller, 1847)
- Phalonidia contractana (Zeller, 1847)
- Phalonidia curvistrigana (Stainton, 1859)
- Phalonidia gilvicomana (Zeller, 1847)
- Phalonidia manniana (Fischer v. Röslerstamm, 1839)
- Phaneta pauperana (Duponchel, 1843)
- Phiaris bipunctana (Fabricius, 1794)
- Phiaris helveticana Duponchel, 1844
- Phiaris metallicana (Hübner, 1799)
- Phiaris micana (Denis & Schiffermuller, 1775)
- Phiaris obsoletana (Zetterstedt, 1839)
- Phiaris palustrana (Lienig & Zeller, 1846)
- Phiaris schulziana (Fabricius, 1776)
- Phiaris scoriana (Guenee, 1845)
- Phiaris septentrionana (Curtis, 1835)
- Phiaris stibiana (Guenee, 1845)
- Phiaris turfosana (Herrich-Schäffer, 1851)
- Phiaris umbrosana (Freyer, 1842)
- Philedone gerningana (Denis & Schiffermuller, 1775)
- Philedonides lunana (Thunberg, 1784)
- Philedonides rhombicana (Herrich-Schäffer, 1851)
- Phtheochroa drenowskyi (Rebel, 1916)
- Phtheochroa duponchelana (Duponchel, 1843)
- Phtheochroa frigidana (Guenee, 1845)
- Phtheochroa fulvicinctana (Constant, 1893)
- Phtheochroa ingridae Huemer, 1990
- Phtheochroa inopiana (Haworth, 1811)
- Phtheochroa pulvillana Herrich-Schäffer, 1851
- Phtheochroa purana (Guenee, 1845)
- Phtheochroa rugosana (Hübner, 1799)
- Phtheochroa schreibersiana (Frolich, 1828)
- Phtheochroa simoniana (Staudinger, 1859)
- Phtheochroa sodaliana (Haworth, 1811)
- Phtheochroa vulneratana (Zetterstedt, 1839)
- Piniphila bifasciana (Haworth, 1811)
- Pristerognatha penthinana (Guenee, 1845)
- Prochlidonia amiantana (Hübner, 1799)
- Propiromorpha rhodophana (Herrich-Schäffer, 1851)
- Pseudargyrotoza conwagana (Fabricius, 1775)
- Pseudeulia asinana (Hübner, 1799)
- Pseudococcyx mughiana (Zeller, 1868)
- Pseudococcyx posticana (Zetterstedt, 1839)
- Pseudococcyx tessulatana (Staudinger, 1871)
- Pseudococcyx turionella (Linnaeus, 1758)
- Pseudohermenias abietana (Fabricius, 1787)
- Pseudophiaris sappadana (Della Beffa & Rocca, 1937)
- Pseudosciaphila branderiana (Linnaeus, 1758)
- Ptycholoma lecheana (Linnaeus, 1758)
- Ptycholomoides aeriferana (Herrich-Schäffer, 1851)
- Retinia resinella (Linnaeus, 1758)
- Rhopobota myrtillana (Humphreys & Westwood, 1845)
- Rhopobota naevana (Hübner, 1817)
- Rhopobota stagnana (Denis & Schiffermuller, 1775)
- Rhopobota ustomaculana (Curtis, 1831)
- Rhyacionia buoliana (Denis & Schiffermuller, 1775)
- Rhyacionia duplana (Hübner, 1813)
- Rhyacionia pinicolana (Doubleday, 1849)
- Rhyacionia pinivorana (Lienig & Zeller, 1846)
- Selania capparidana (Zeller, 1847)
- Selania leplastriana (Curtis, 1831)
- Selania resedana (Obraztsov, 1959)
- Selenodes karelica (Tengstrom, 1875)
- Sparganothis pilleriana (Denis & Schiffermuller, 1775)
- Spatalistis bifasciana (Hübner, 1787)
- Sphaleroptera alpicolana (Frolich, 1830)
- Spilonota laricana (Heinemann, 1863)
- Spilonota ocellana (Denis & Schiffermuller, 1775)
- Stictea mygindiana (Denis & Schiffermuller, 1775)
- Strophedra nitidana (Fabricius, 1794)
- Strophedra weirana (Douglas, 1850)
- Syndemis musculana (Hübner, 1799)
- Thiodia citrana (Hübner, 1799)
- Thiodia lerneana (Treitschke, 1835)
- Thiodia major (Rebel, 1903)
- Thiodia torridana (Lederer, 1859)
- Thiodia trochilana (Frolich, 1828)
- Tortricodes alternella (Denis & Schiffermuller, 1775)
- Tortrix viridana Linnaeus, 1758
- Tosirips magyarus Razowski, 1987
- Xerocnephasia rigana (Sodoffsky, 1829)
- Zeiraphera griseana (Hübner, 1799)
- Zeiraphera isertana (Fabricius, 1794)
- Zeiraphera ratzeburgiana (Saxesen, 1840)
- Zeiraphera rufimitrana (Herrich-Schäffer, 1851)

== Urodidae ==
- Wockia asperipunctella (Bruand, 1851)

== Yponomeutidae ==
- Cedestis gysseleniella Zeller, 1839
- Cedestis subfasciella (Stephens, 1834)
- Euhyponomeuta stannella (Thunberg, 1788)
- Kessleria albescens (Rebel, 1899)
- Kessleria alpicella (Stainton, 1851)
- Kessleria alternans (Staudinger, 1871)
- Kessleria apenninica Huemer & Mutanen, 2015
- Kessleria caflischiella (Frey, 1880)
- Kessleria cottiensis Huemer & Mutanen, 2015
- Kessleria insubrica Huemer & Tarmann, 1993
- Kessleria klimeschi Huemer & Tarmann, 1992
- Kessleria nivescens Burmann, 1980
- Kessleria orobiae Huemer & Mutanen, 2015
- Kessleria petrobiella (Zeller, 1868)
- Kessleria saxifragae (Stainton, 1868)
- Niphonympha dealbatella (Zeller, 1847)
- Ocnerostoma piniariella Zeller, 1847
- Paradoxus osyridellus Stainton, 1869
- Parahyponomeuta egregiella (Duponchel, 1839)
- Paraswammerdamia albicapitella (Scharfenberg, 1805)
- Paraswammerdamia nebulella (Goeze, 1783)
- Pseudoswammerdamia combinella (Hübner, 1786)
- Scythropia crataegella (Linnaeus, 1767)
- Swammerdamia caesiella (Hübner, 1796)
- Swammerdamia compunctella Herrich-Schäffer, 1855
- Swammerdamia pyrella (Villers, 1789)
- Yponomeuta cagnagella (Hübner, 1813)
- Yponomeuta evonymella (Linnaeus, 1758)
- Yponomeuta irrorella (Hübner, 1796)
- Yponomeuta mahalebella Guenee, 1845
- Yponomeuta malinellus Zeller, 1838
- Yponomeuta padella (Linnaeus, 1758)
- Yponomeuta plumbella (Denis & Schiffermuller, 1775)
- Yponomeuta rorrella (Hübner, 1796)
- Yponomeuta sedella Treitschke, 1832
- Zelleria hepariella Stainton, 1849
- Zelleria oleastrella (Milliere, 1864)

== Ypsolophidae ==
- Ochsenheimeria glabratella Muller-Rutz, 1914
- Ochsenheimeria taurella (Denis & Schiffermuller, 1775)
- Ochsenheimeria urella Fischer von Röslerstamm, 1842
- Phrealcia eximiella (Rebel, 1899)
- Ypsolopha albiramella (Mann, 1861)
- Ypsolopha alpella (Denis & Schiffermuller, 1775)
- Ypsolopha asperella (Linnaeus, 1761)
- Ypsolopha dentella (Fabricius, 1775)
- Ypsolopha falcella (Denis & Schiffermuller, 1775)
- Ypsolopha horridella (Treitschke, 1835)
- Ypsolopha lucella (Fabricius, 1775)
- Ypsolopha mucronella (Scopoli, 1763)
- Ypsolopha nemorella (Linnaeus, 1758)
- Ypsolopha parenthesella (Linnaeus, 1761)
- Ypsolopha persicella (Fabricius, 1787)
- Ypsolopha scabrella (Linnaeus, 1761)
- Ypsolopha sequella (Clerck, 1759)
- Ypsolopha sylvella (Linnaeus, 1767)
- Ypsolopha ustella (Clerck, 1759)
- Ypsolopha vittella (Linnaeus, 1758)

== Zygaenidae ==
- Adscita albanica (Naufock, 1926)
- Adscita alpina (Alberti, 1937)
- Adscita geryon (Hübner, 1813)
- Adscita italica (Alberti, 1937)
- Adscita statices (Linnaeus, 1758)
- Adscita mannii (Lederer, 1853)
- Aglaope infausta (Linnaeus, 1767)
- Jordanita chloros (Hübner, 1813)
- Jordanita globulariae (Hübner, 1793)
- Jordanita tenuicornis (Zeller, 1847)
- Jordanita subsolana (Staudinger, 1862)
- Jordanita budensis (Ad. & Au. Speyer, 1858)
- Jordanita notata (Zeller, 1847)
- Rhagades pruni (Denis & Schiffermuller, 1775)
- Theresimima ampellophaga (Bayle-Barelle, 1808)
- Zygaena carniolica (Scopoli, 1763)
- Zygaena fausta (Linnaeus, 1767)
- Zygaena hilaris Ochsenheimer, 1808
- Zygaena occitanica (Villers, 1789)
- Zygaena orana Duponchel, 1835
- Zygaena brizae (Esper, 1800)
- Zygaena corsica Boisduval, 1828
- Zygaena cynarae (Esper, 1789)
- Zygaena erythrus (Hübner, 1806)
- Zygaena minos (Denis & Schiffermuller, 1775)
- Zygaena punctum Ochsenheimer, 1808
- Zygaena purpuralis (Brunnich, 1763)
- Zygaena rubicundus (Hübner, 1817)
- Zygaena sarpedon (Hübner, 1790)
- Zygaena ephialtes (Linnaeus, 1767)
- Zygaena exulans (Hohenwarth, 1792)
- Zygaena filipendulae (Linnaeus, 1758)
- Zygaena lavandulae (Esper, 1783)
- Zygaena lonicerae (Scheven, 1777)
- Zygaena loti (Denis & Schiffermuller, 1775)
- Zygaena osterodensis Reiss, 1921
- Zygaena oxytropis Boisduval, 1828
- Zygaena rhadamanthus (Esper, 1789)
- Zygaena romeo Duponchel, 1835
- Zygaena transalpina (Esper, 1780)
- Zygaena trifolii (Esper, 1783)
- Zygaena viciae (Denis & Schiffermuller, 1775)

== See also ==
- List of butterflies of Italy
