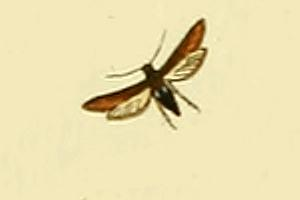

Scientific classification
- Kingdom: Animalia
- Phylum: Arthropoda
- Clade: Pancrustacea
- Class: Insecta
- Order: Lepidoptera
- Family: Sesiidae
- Genus: Microsphecia
- Species: M. brosiformis

Binomial name
- Microsphecia brosiformis (Hübner, [1813])

Synonyms
- Sphinx brosiformis Hübner, [1813]; Tinthia brosiformis; Zenodoxus dorsalis Le Cerf, 1914; Zenodoxus dorsalis f. obscura Le Cerf, 1914

= Microsphecia brosiformis =

Species of moth

Microsphecia brosiformis is a moth of the family Sesiidae. It is found from the Balkan Peninsula to the Crimea, southern Russia (Sarepta), Asia Minor, the Caucasus, Iran, Turkmenistan and Afghanistan.

The larvae feed on the roots of Convolvulus species, including Convolvulus arvensis.
