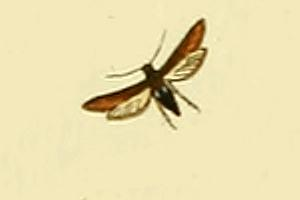
- Microsphecia brosiformis

Scientific classification
- Domain: Eukaryota
- Kingdom: Animalia
- Phylum: Arthropoda
- Class: Insecta
- Order: Lepidoptera
- Family: Sesiidae
- Tribe: Tinthiini
- Genus: Microsphecia; Bartel, 1912

Species
- See text

= Microsphecia =

Genus of moths

Microsphecia is a genus of moths in the family Sesiidae.

== Species ==
- Microsphecia brosiformis (Hübner, [1808-1813])
- Microsphecia tineiformis (Esper, [1789])
