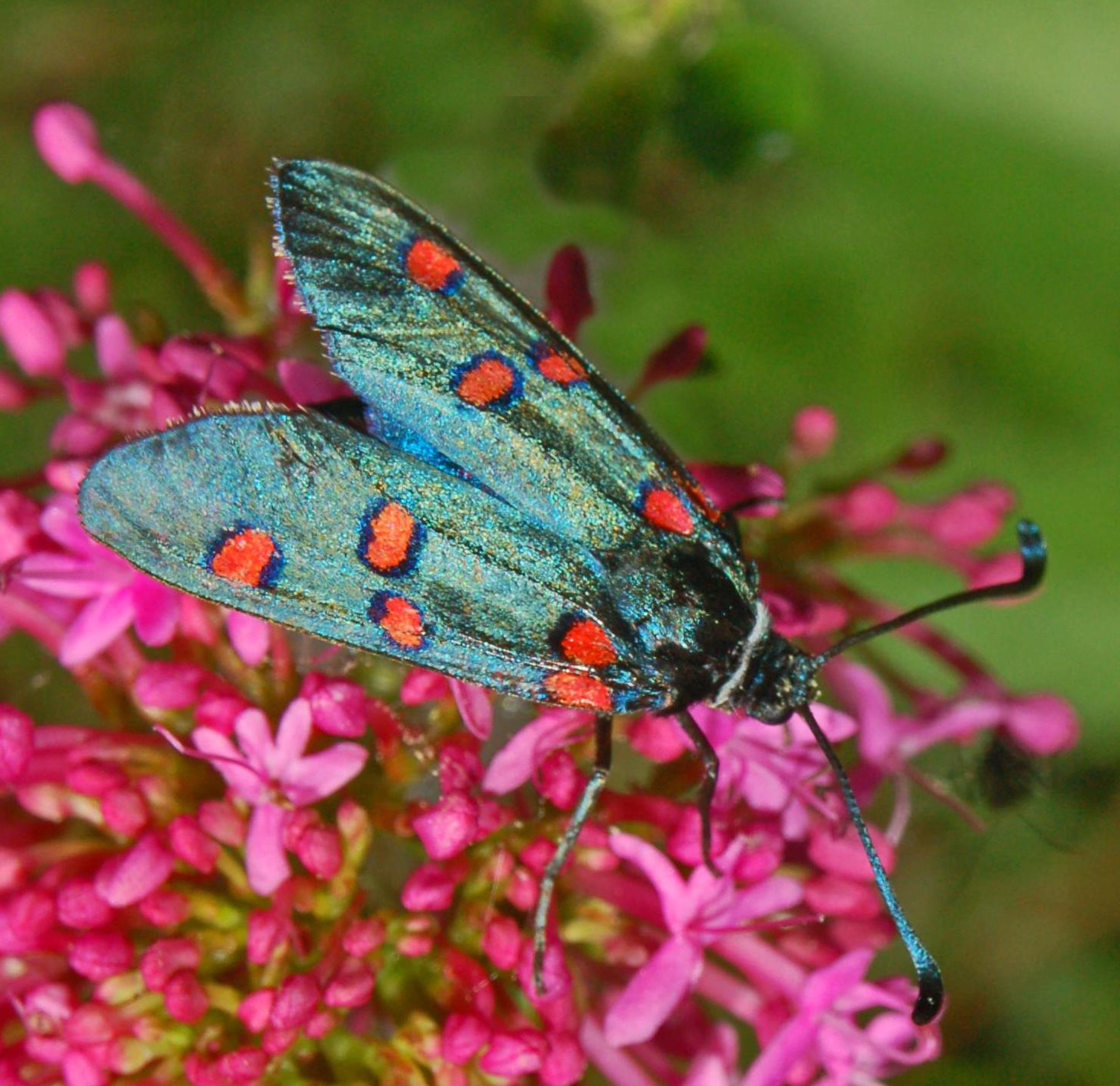
- Zygaena lavandulae, upperside

Scientific classification
- Domain: Eukaryota
- Kingdom: Animalia
- Phylum: Arthropoda
- Class: Insecta
- Order: Lepidoptera
- Family: Zygaenidae
- Genus: Zygaena
- Species: Z. lavandulae

Binomial name
- Zygaena lavandulae (Esper, 1783)

Synonyms
- Sphinx lavandulae Esper, 1783; Sphinx spicae Hübner, 1796; Zygaena consobrina German, [1835]; Zygaena altalavandulae Reiss, 1953; Zygaena izilanica Reiss, 1944; Zygaena teruelensis Reiss, 1936; Zygaena oropesica Reiss, 1965

= Zygaena lavandulae =

Species of moth

Zygaena lavandulae is a species of moth in the family Zygaenidae.

== Subspecies ==
Subspecies include:

- Zygaena lavandulae lavandulae
- Zygaena lavandulae alfacarica Tremewan, 1961
- Zygaena lavandulae barcelonica Reiss, 1936
- Zygaena lavandulae consobrina Germar, 1836
- Zygaena lavandulae espunnensis Reiss, 1922
- Zygaena lavandulae micheaellae Rungs & Le Charles, 1943

== Distribution ==
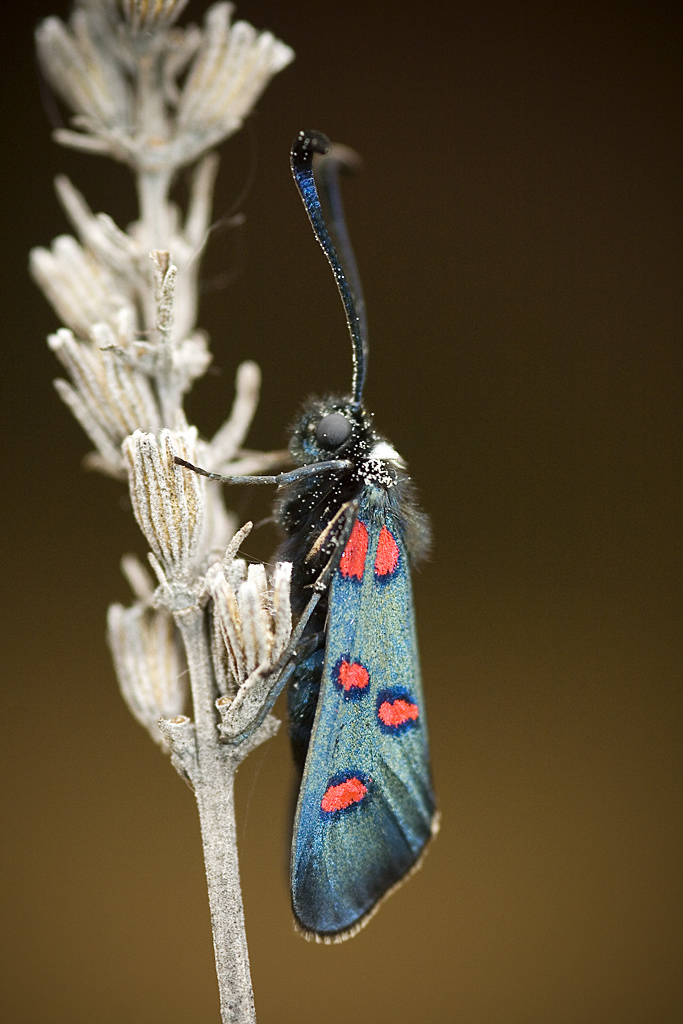
Lateral view

This species can be found in Southern France, eastern Spain, Portugal and Italy (only in central and western Liguria), as well as North Africa, including Morocco.

== Description ==
Zygaena lavandulae has a wingspan of 31–36 millimetres (1.2–1.4 in) in males and of 35–37 millimetres (1.4–1.5 in) in females. The head is black. The thorax is black with a white collar. Also the abdomen is black, with a slight blue gloss. Forewings are bluish, with five red spots surrounded with black or dark blue. Hindwings are bluish-black with a very large distal red spot. Colorations of the females are rather similar to males, but their forewings are usually bluish-green, with larger spots.

== Habitat ==
These moths mainly inhabit rocky places, dry woods and grove rich grasslands. They are present in the Maquis shrubland, characterized by the widespread presence of Cistus species.

== Biology ==
There is one generation per year (univoltine). The larvae feed on Dorycnium pentaphyllum and Anthyllis cytisoides. They develop until April without real dormancy. Adults are on wing from April to June.
