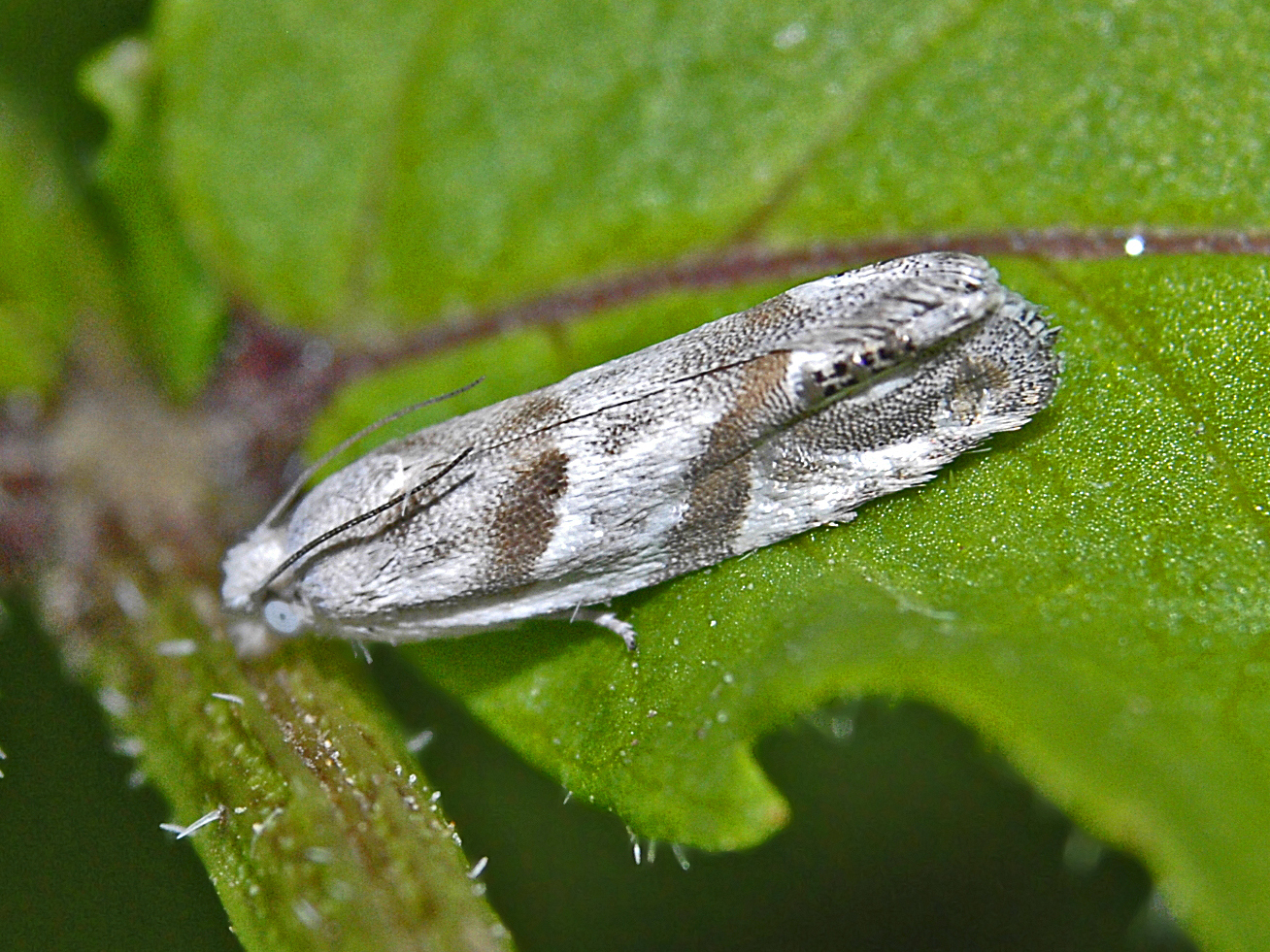
- A live individual

Scientific classification
- Kingdom: Animalia
- Phylum: Arthropoda
- Clade: Pancrustacea
- Class: Insecta
- Order: Lepidoptera
- Family: Tortricidae
- Genus: Eucosma
- Species: E. pupillana

Binomial name
- Eucosma pupillana (Clerck, 1759)

Synonyms
- Phalaena pupillana Clerck, 1759; Tortrix absinthiana Hubner, [1796-1799]; Olethreutes absynthiana Hubner, 1822; Eucosma Phaneta pupillana saerdabana Obraztsov, 1968

= Eucosma pupillana =

Species of moth

Eucosma pupillana is a species of moth of the family Tortricidae.

== Description ==
The wingspan is 14–19 mm. Adults have been recorded on wing from July to August in Europe.

The larvae feed on Artemisia absinthium. They feed inside the stems and roots of their host plant.

== Distribution ==
This species can be found in Great Britain, Spain, France, Belgium, the Netherlands, Germany, Denmark, Austria, Switzerland, Italy included Sicily, the Czech Republic, Slovakia, Slovenia, Hungary, Bulgaria, Romania, Poland, Norway, Sweden, Finland, the Baltic region, Russia (Ural Mountains), Asia Minor, Iran, Kazakhstan, Tajikistan, Kyrgyzstan and China (Heilongjiang, Shaanxi, Qinghai, Xinjiang).
