= Scythris imperiella =

Scientific classification
- Kingdom: Animalia
- Phylum: Arthropoda
- Class: Insecta
- Order: Lepidoptera
- Family: Scythrididae
- Genus: Scythris
- Species: S. imperiella

Binomial name
- Scythris imperiella Jäckh, 1978

Species of moth

Scythris imperiella is a moth of the family Scythrididae. It was described by Eberhard Jäckh in 1978. It is found in France, Spain, Italy, Morocco and Turkey.
