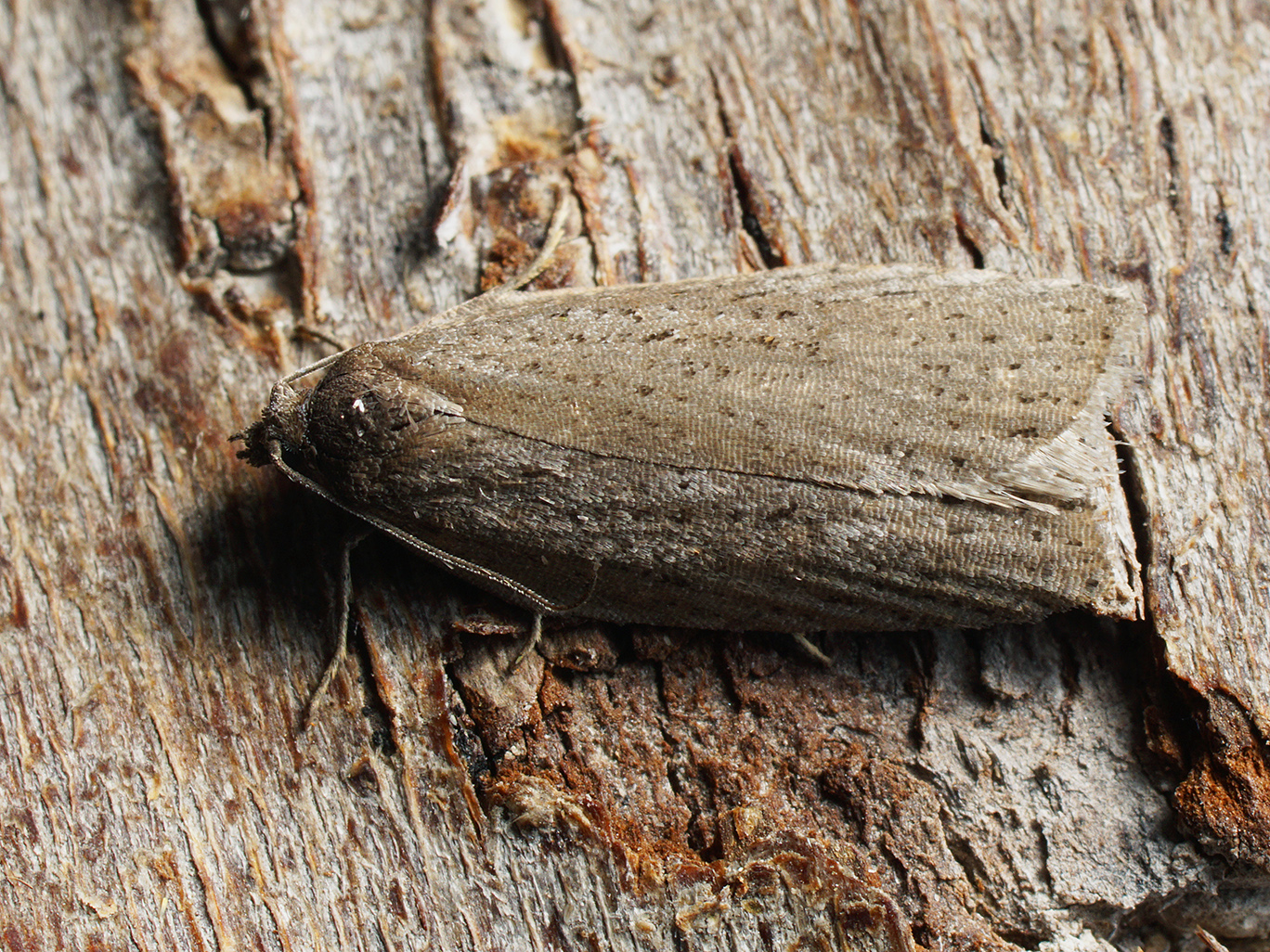

Scientific classification
- Domain: Eukaryota
- Kingdom: Animalia
- Phylum: Arthropoda
- Class: Insecta
- Order: Lepidoptera
- Family: Tortricidae
- Genus: Acleris
- Species: A. lipsiana

Binomial name
- Acleris lipsiana (Denis & Schiffermuller, 1775)

Synonyms
- Tortrix lipsiana Denis & Schiffermuller, 1775; Peronea lipsiana ab. costimaculana Sheldon, 1930; Acalla lipsiana ab. eutaeniana Preissecker, 1928; Peronea lipsiana ab. griseana Sheldon, 1930; Tortrix strigulana Frolich, 1828; Tortrix sudorana Frolich, 1828; Eutrachia sudoriana Hubner, 1822; Tortrix sudoriana Hubner, [1822–1823]

= Acleris lipsiana =

Species of moth

Acleris lipsiana is a species of moth of the family Tortricidae. It is found in Great Britain, Spain, France, Belgium, the Netherlands, Germany, Denmark, Austria, Switzerland, Italy, the Czech Republic, Slovakia, Hungary, Poland, Greece, Norway, Sweden, Finland, the Baltic region and Russia. It is also found in North America, where it has been recorded from Alberta and Washington. The habitat consists of high moors and mountainous areas.

The wingspan is 17–24 mm. Adults are on wing from August to October and, after hibernation, to April.

The larvae feed on Vaccinium myrtillus, Vaccinium vitis-idaea, Myrica gale, Malus sylvestris, Betula and Pyrus species. They feed from within spun shoots or leaves of their host plant. Larvae can be found from June to July. Pupation takes places at the feeding place or on the ground.
