= Scythris adustella =

Scientific classification
- Kingdom: Animalia
- Phylum: Arthropoda
- Class: Insecta
- Order: Lepidoptera
- Family: Scythrididae
- Genus: Scythris
- Species: S. adustella

Binomial name
- Scythris adustella Jäckh, 1978

Species of moth

Scythris adustella is a moth of the family Scythrididae. It was described by Jäckh in 1978. It is found in France and northern Italy.
