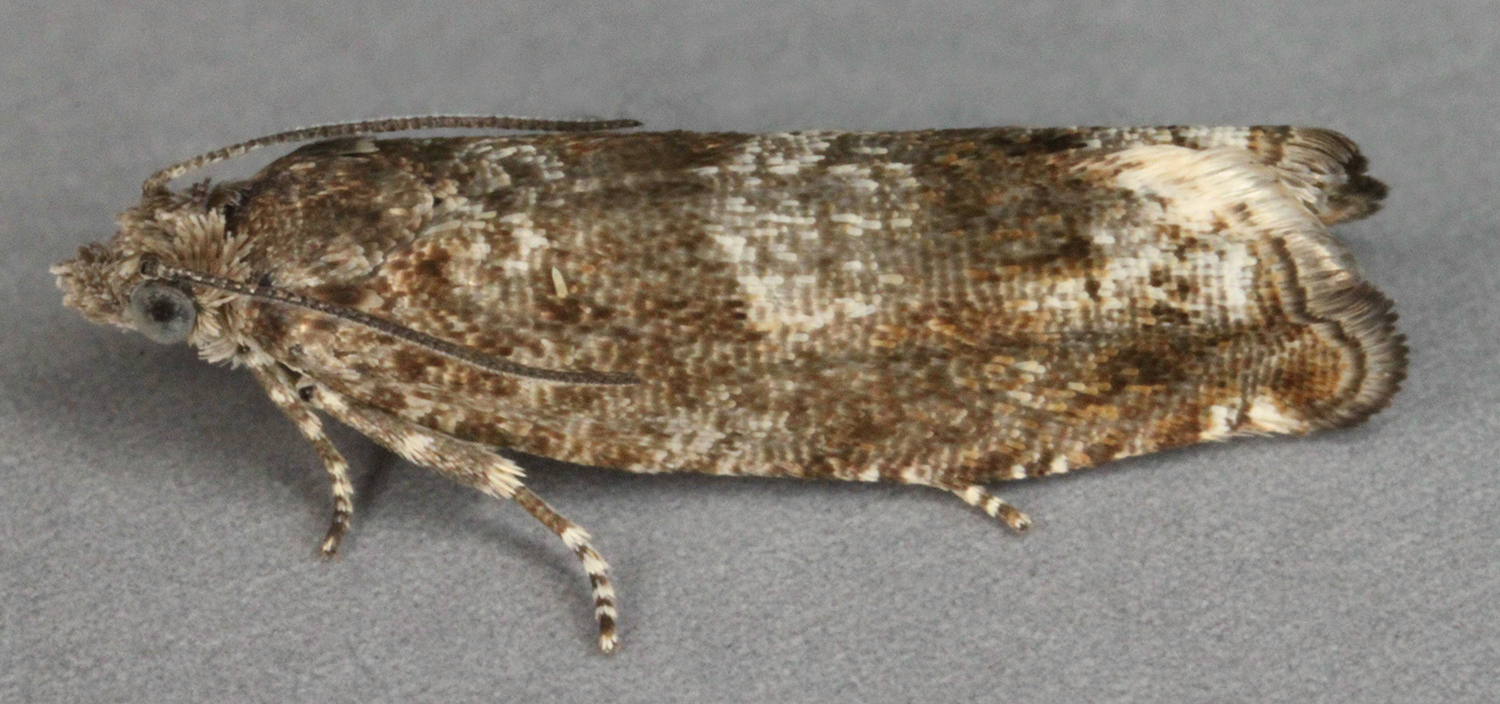
- Epinotia tetraquetrana, Sarnau, North Wales

Scientific classification
- Kingdom: Animalia
- Phylum: Arthropoda
- Clade: Pancrustacea
- Class: Insecta
- Order: Lepidoptera
- Family: Tortricidae
- Genus: Epinotia
- Species: E. tetraquetrana

Binomial name
- Epinotia tetraquetrana (Haworth, [1811])

Synonyms
- Tortrix tetraquetrana Haworth, [1811]; Tortrix angulana Haworth, [1811]; Eucosma tetraquetrana f. deficiens Dufrane, 1957; Phlaeodes frutelata Desmarest, in Chenu, 1857; Tortrix frutetana Hubner, [1823-1824]; Tortrix hypoleucana Frolich, 1828; Steganoptycha tetraquetrana kurilensis Kuznetzov, 1969; Epiblema tetraquetranum ab. ochreana Hauder, 1918; Epiblema tetraquetranum f. opacana Hauder, 1918; Eucosma tetraquetrana f. rufa Dufrane, 1957; Tortrix triquetrana Haworth, [1811]; Paedisca tetraquetrana f. umbratana Strand, 1901

= Epinotia tetraquetrana =

Species of moth

Epinotia tetraquetrana, the square-barred bell, is a moth of the family Tortricidae. It is found from most of Europe east to the Near East and the eastern part of the Palearctic realm.

The wingspan is 12–16 mm. The forewings are fuscous, darker-strigulated, often whitish-mixed. The costa is strigulated with blackish and posteriorly with white. The edge of the basal patch is suffused with ferruginous-brown, partly blackish-marked and obtusely angulated Beyond this there is sometimes an obscure whitish subquadrate dorsal spot. The central fascia is darker, often ferruginous-suffused; costal half beyond this sometimes ferruginous suffused, with some black scales. The ocellus is obscurely edged with leaden-metallic, usually preceded by a small black subdorsal spot. The termen is sinuate. There is a white subapical dash in cilia. The hindwings are grey. The larva is pale yellowish-green; head and plate of 2 dark or light brown.

Adults are on wing from April to May.

The young larvae bore into the stem of Betula and Alnus species. Later, they feed within a folded leaf.

== Gallery ==
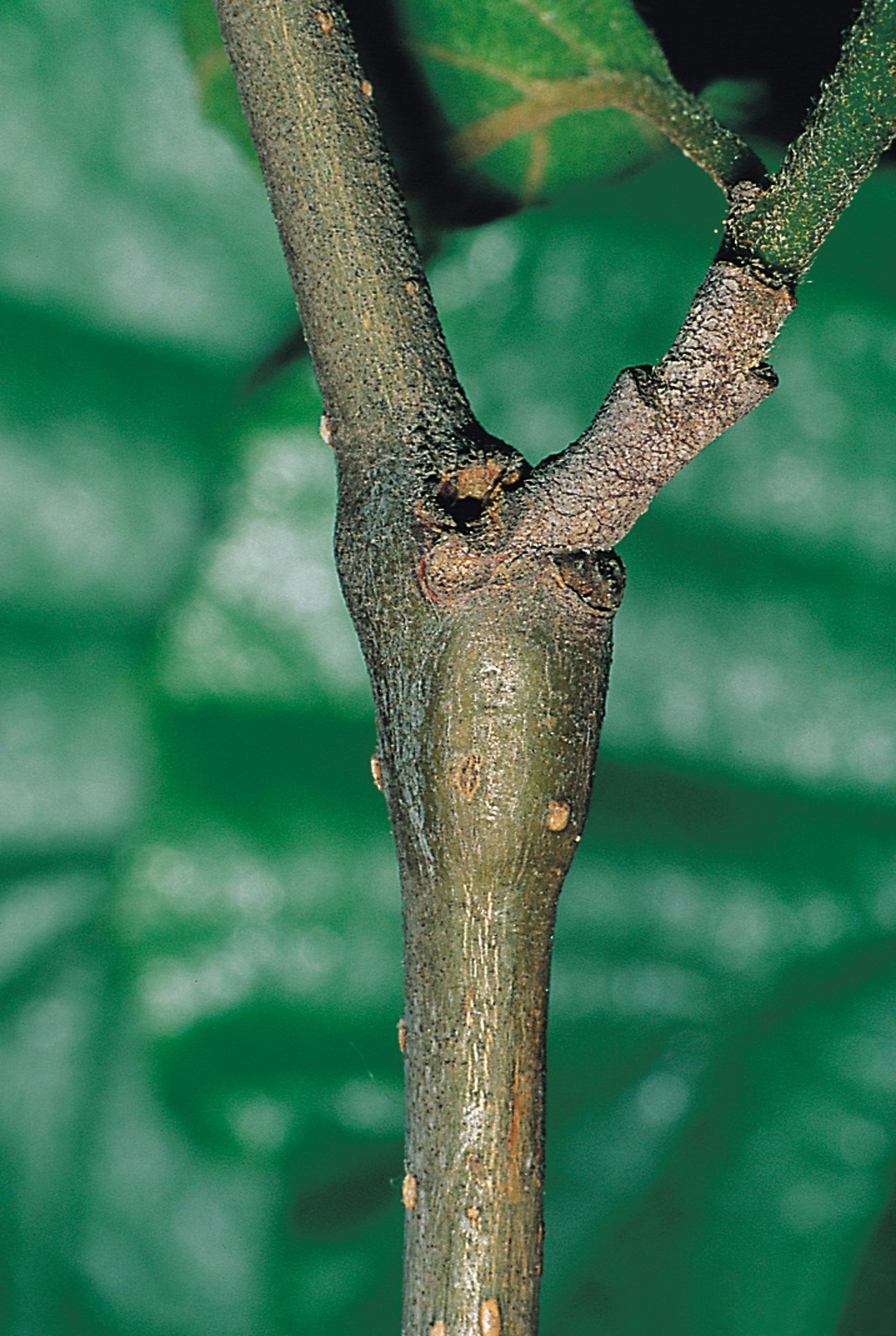
Damage

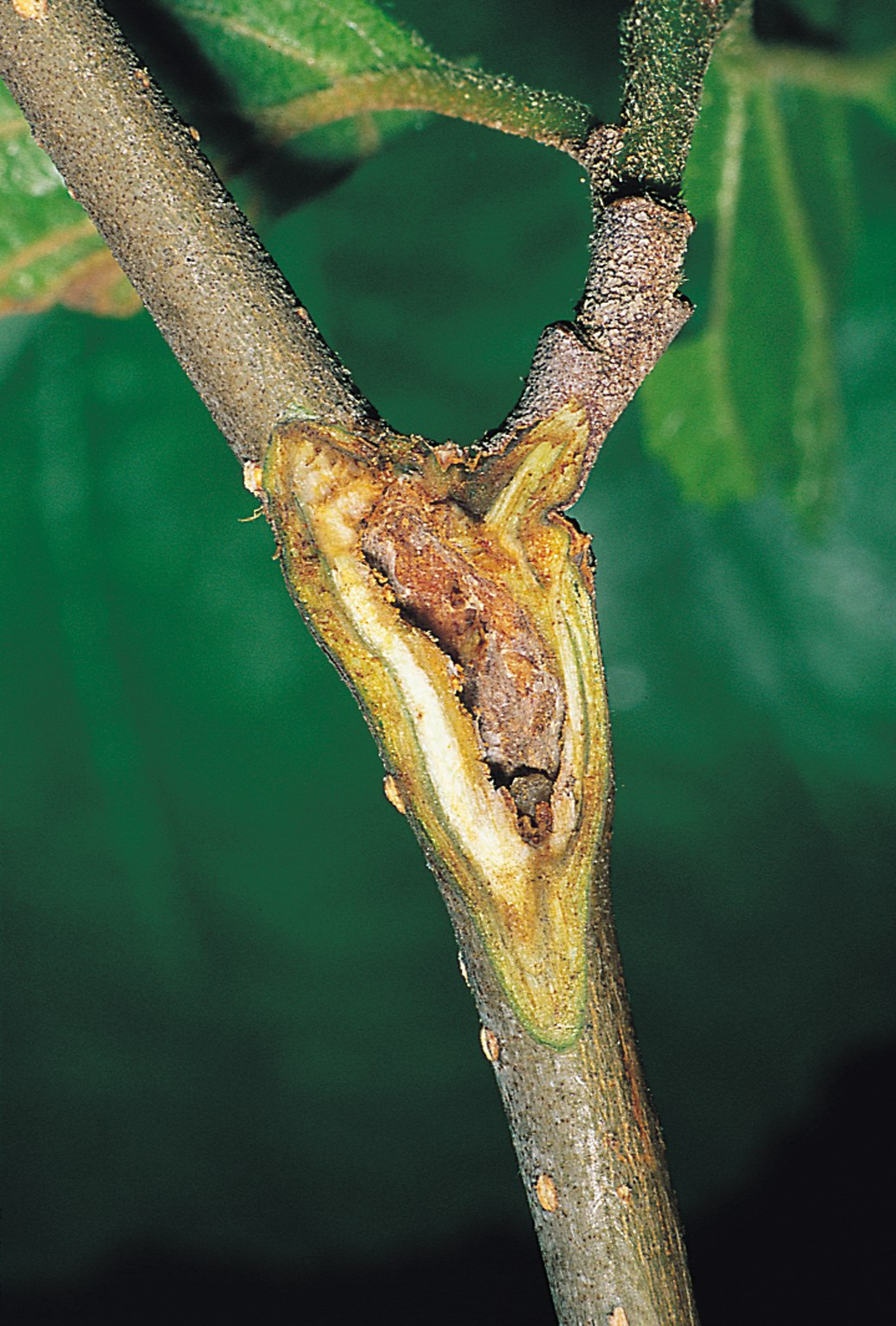
Damage
