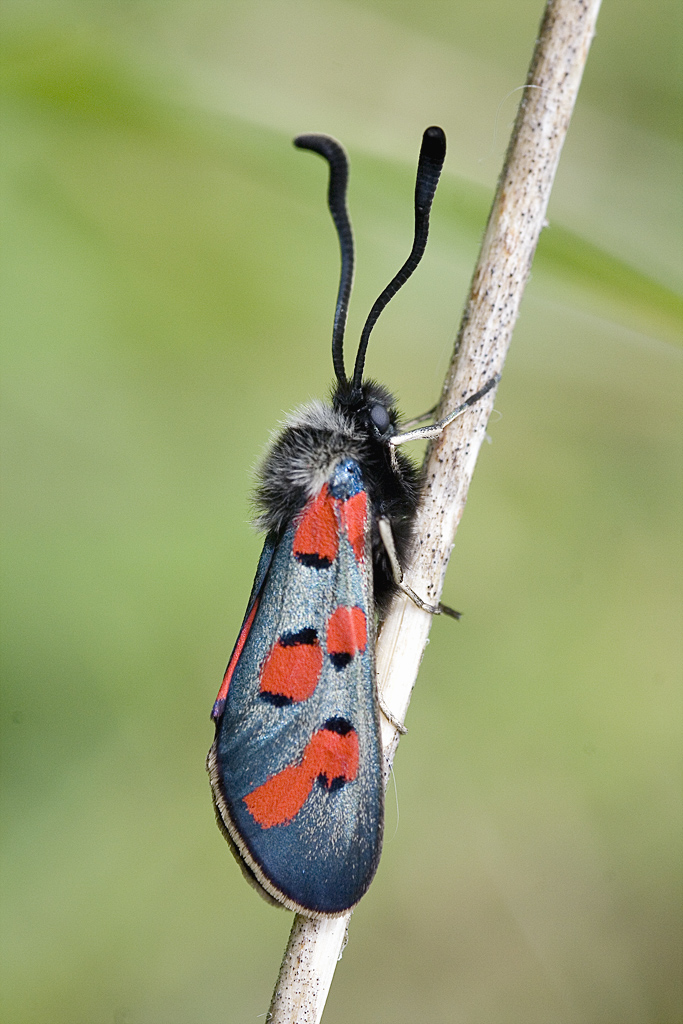

Scientific classification
- Kingdom: Animalia
- Phylum: Arthropoda
- Class: Insecta
- Order: Lepidoptera
- Family: Zygaenidae
- Genus: Zygaena
- Species: Z. rhadamanthus

Binomial name
- Zygaena rhadamanthus (Esper, 1789)

Synonyms
- Sphinx rhadamanthus Esper, 1789; Zygaena staechadis Boisduval, 1834; Zygaena kiesenwetteri Herrich-Schäffer, 1852; Zygaena algarbiensis Christ, 1889; Zygaena ozureoides Reiss, 1953; Zygaena rhadamanthus cleui Dujardin, 1956; Zygaena rhadamanthus pyrenaea Verity, 1920; Zygaena rhadamanthus boixolsis Aistleitner, 1990

= Zygaena rhadamanthus =

Species of moth

Zygaena rhadamanthus is a species of moth in the Zygaenidae family. It is found in France, Spain, Portugal and Italy.

The larvae feed on Onobrychis, Dorycnium pentaphyllum and Lotus species. The species overwinters in the larval stage.

== Technical description and variation ==
Z. rhadamanthus Esp. (6g). Forewing strongly transparent, glossy grey, with 6 red spots, the 2., 3., 4. and 5. being edged with black at the proximal and distal sides. Riviera and Catalonia. — cingulata Led. (6h) [ ab. of rhadamanthus] has a red belt. This is a normal form in Spain, while in Liguria only single individuals of it are found among typical specimens. —kiesenwetteri H.-Sch. [Z. rhadamanthus ssp. kiesenwetteri Herrich-Schäffer, 1852] (6h) has quite a different aspect on account of the deep black ground-colour of the forewing and the black hindwing, resembling lavandulae or stoechadis, but the black edges of the spots of the forewing are easily visible on the black ground. — algarbiensis Christ. [Z. rhadamanthus ssp. algarbiensis Christ, 1889] (= roederi Stgr.) (6h), from South Portugal, is similar, but the 6. spot of the forewing is entirely obsolete or only slightly vestigial. — Larva variegated, grey, black, longitudinally striped with white and yellow, with red collar; in April full-grown on Dorycnium. Pupa in a white oval cocoon. The moths in spring till May, frequently sitting on stalks of grass.

== Subspecies ==
- Zygaena rhadamanthus rhadamanthus
- Zygaena rhadamanthus alfacarensis Reiss, 1922
- Zygaena rhadamanthus algarbiensis Christ, 1889
- Zygaena rhadamanthus aragonia Tremewan, 1961 (Spain: provinces of Cuenca and Teruel)
- Zygaena rhadamanthus aurargentea Mazel, 1979 (France: Pyrénées-Orientales, Spain: Barcelona and Girona)
- Zygaena rhadamanthus azurea Burgeff, 1914 (France: départements of Var and Alpes-Maritimes)
- Zygaena rhadamanthus caroniana Reiss, 1965
- Zygaena rhadamanthus gredosica Reiss, 1936
- Zygaena rhadamanthus grisea Oberthur, 1909 (south-eastern and southern-central France: from Alpes-de-Haute-Provence and Hautes-Alpes to Isère, Drôme, Ardèche, Vaucluse, Aveyron, Lot and Lozère)
- Zygaena rhadamanthus guichardi Tremewan, 1991
- Zygaena rhadamanthus isabelae Gonzalo Fidel, 1980
- Zygaena rhadamanthus kiesenwetteri Herrich-Schaffer, 1852
- Zygaena rhadamanthus rasura Agenjo, 1948
- Zygaena rhadamanthus stygia Burgeff, 1914 (east of the River Var in Alpes-Maritimes in France to Imperia in Italy)
