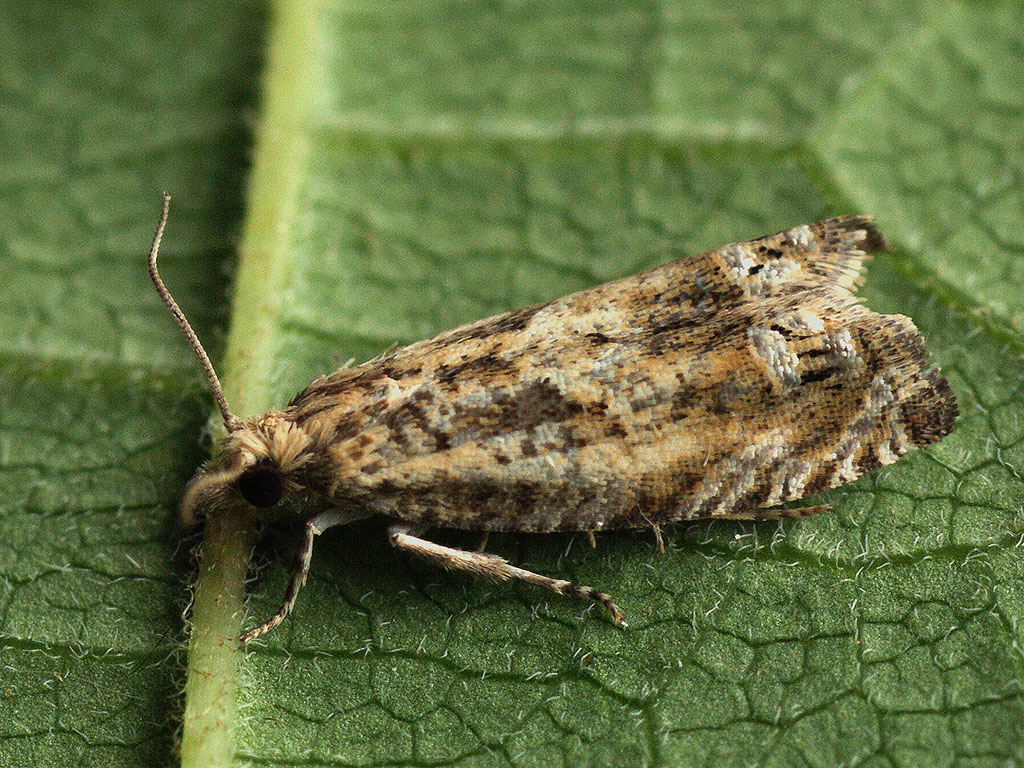

Scientific classification
- Kingdom: Animalia
- Phylum: Arthropoda
- Clade: Pancrustacea
- Class: Insecta
- Order: Lepidoptera
- Family: Tortricidae
- Genus: Eucosma
- Species: E. aemulana

Binomial name
- Eucosma aemulana (Schläger, 1849)

Synonyms
- Grapholitha aemulana Schläger, 1849; Tortrix (Semasia) aemulata var. latiorana Herrich-Schaffer, 1851

= Eucosma aemulana =

Species of moth

Eucosma aemulana, the obscure bell, is a species of moth of the family Tortricidae. It is found in China (Tianjin, Shanxi, Zhejiang, Anhui, Fujian, Henan, Sichuan, Guizhou, Shaanxi, Gansu), Korea, Russia and most of Europe. It is also found in the United States, where it has been recorded from Colorado, New Mexico, Oklahoma and Utah. The habitat consists of woodlands, chalk downland and cliffs.

The wingspan is 11–16 mm. Adults are on wing from July to August.

The larvae feed on Solidago virgaurea and Aster tripolium. They feed on the seeds within the flowerheads of their host plant. Larvae can be found from August to May. The species overwinters in the pupal stage within a cocoon.
