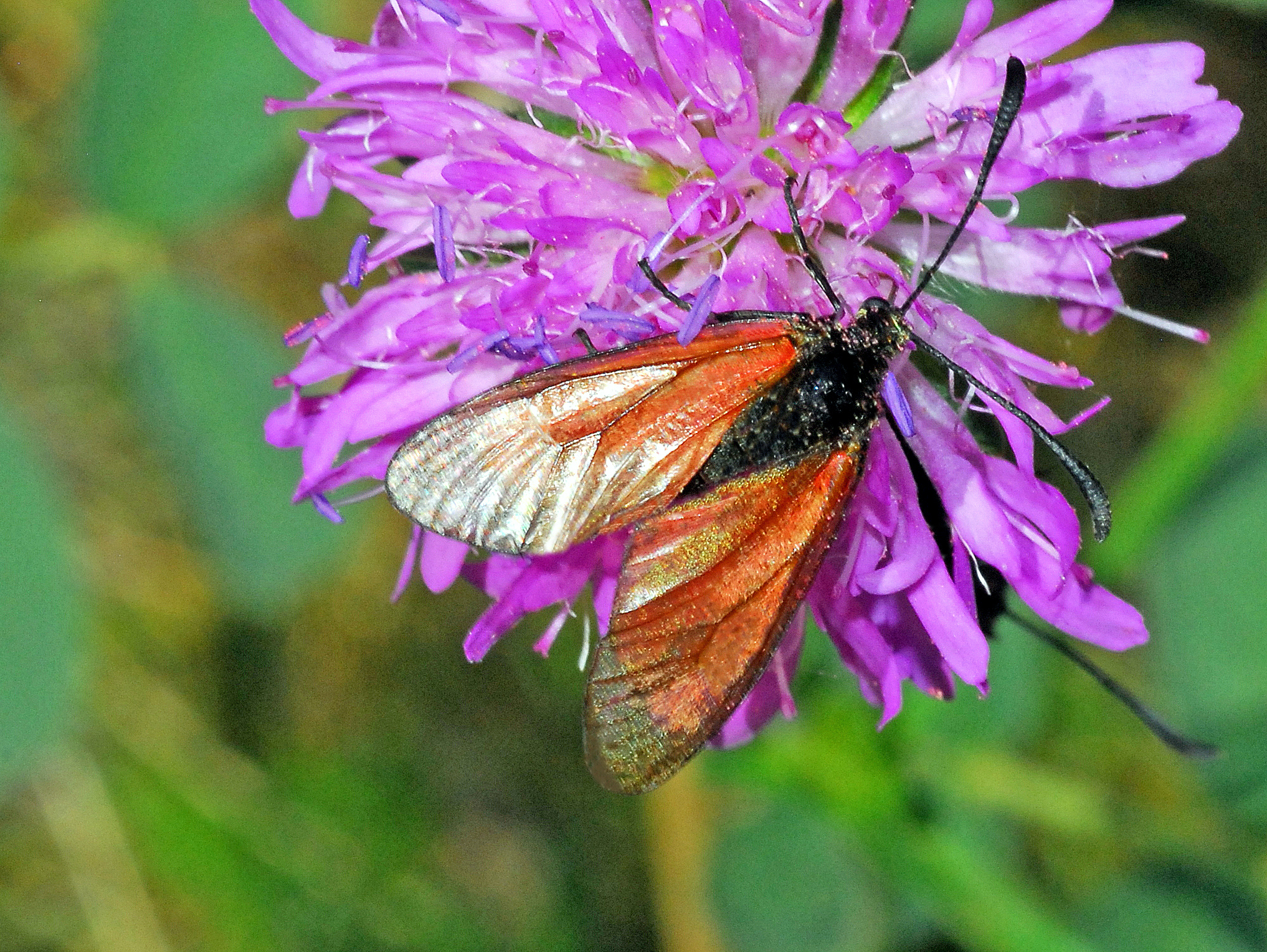

Scientific classification
- Kingdom: Animalia
- Phylum: Arthropoda
- Clade: Pancrustacea
- Class: Insecta
- Order: Lepidoptera
- Family: Zygaenidae
- Genus: Zygaena
- Species: Z. rubicundus

Binomial name
- Zygaena rubicundus (Hubner, 1817)

Synonyms
- Sphinx rubicundus Hubner, 1817; Zygaena pallescens Stauder 1915; Zygaena polygalaeformis Verity 1916; Zygaena pseudofaitensis Stauder 1929

= Zygaena rubicundus =

Species of moth

Zygaena rubicundus, common name fulvous burnet,. is a species of moth in the family Zygaenidae.

== Etymology ==
The Latin species name “rubicundus” means "high fiery red".

== Distribution and habitat ==
This species is endemic to the mainland of Italy. These moths prefer limestone grasslands, mountain slopes and open scrub with the host plant.

== Description ==
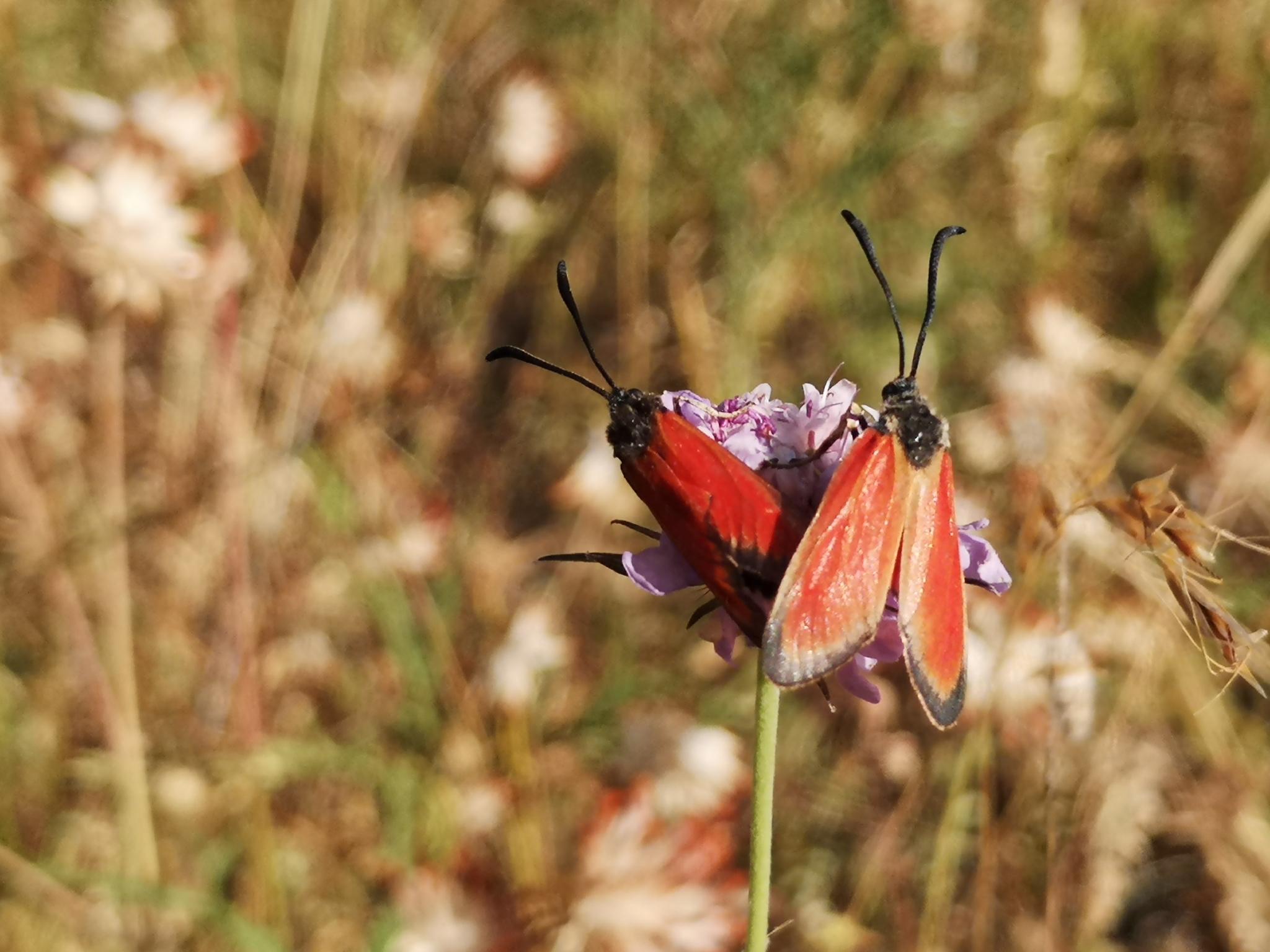
Zygaena rubicundus

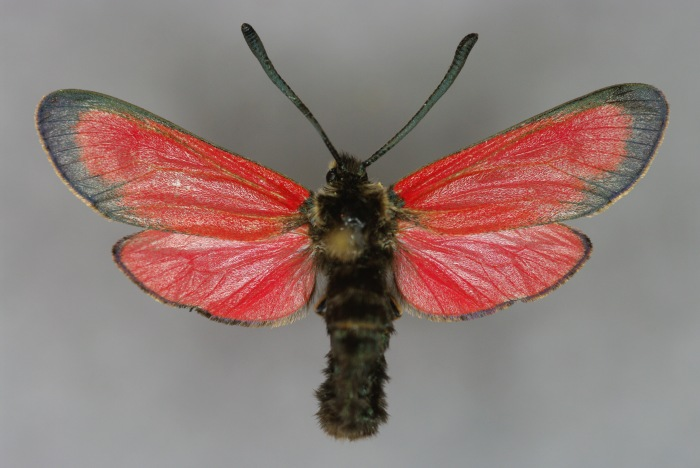
Mounted specimen

Zygaena rubicundus can reach a wingspan of 27–35 mm (1.1–1.4 in). Seitz, A. describes Zygaena rubicundus as follows:- All the wings red, also the hindmargin, only the apex and distal margin of forewing bearing a black edge, which is a little more than 1 mm wide. In Central and South Italy. Very local.

This species is closely related to Zygaena contaminei.

== Biology ==
These rather small diurnal moths develop a complete metamorphosis which involves a pupal stage (holometabolous). Adults are on the wing between June and August. They visit flowers of Centranthus (Valerians). The larvae feed mainly on Eryngium campestre and Eryngium amethystinum.

== Bibliography ==
- Hofmann, A.F. & W.G. Tremewan (2017): The Natural History of Burnet Moths (Zygaena Fabricius, 1775) (Lepidoptera: Zygaenidae). Part 1. – 630 S.; Munich – Vilnius (Proceedings of the Museum Witt).
- Erstbeschreibung: Hübner, J. [1793-1832]: Sammlung europäischer Schmetterlinge 2: pl. 1-38.
