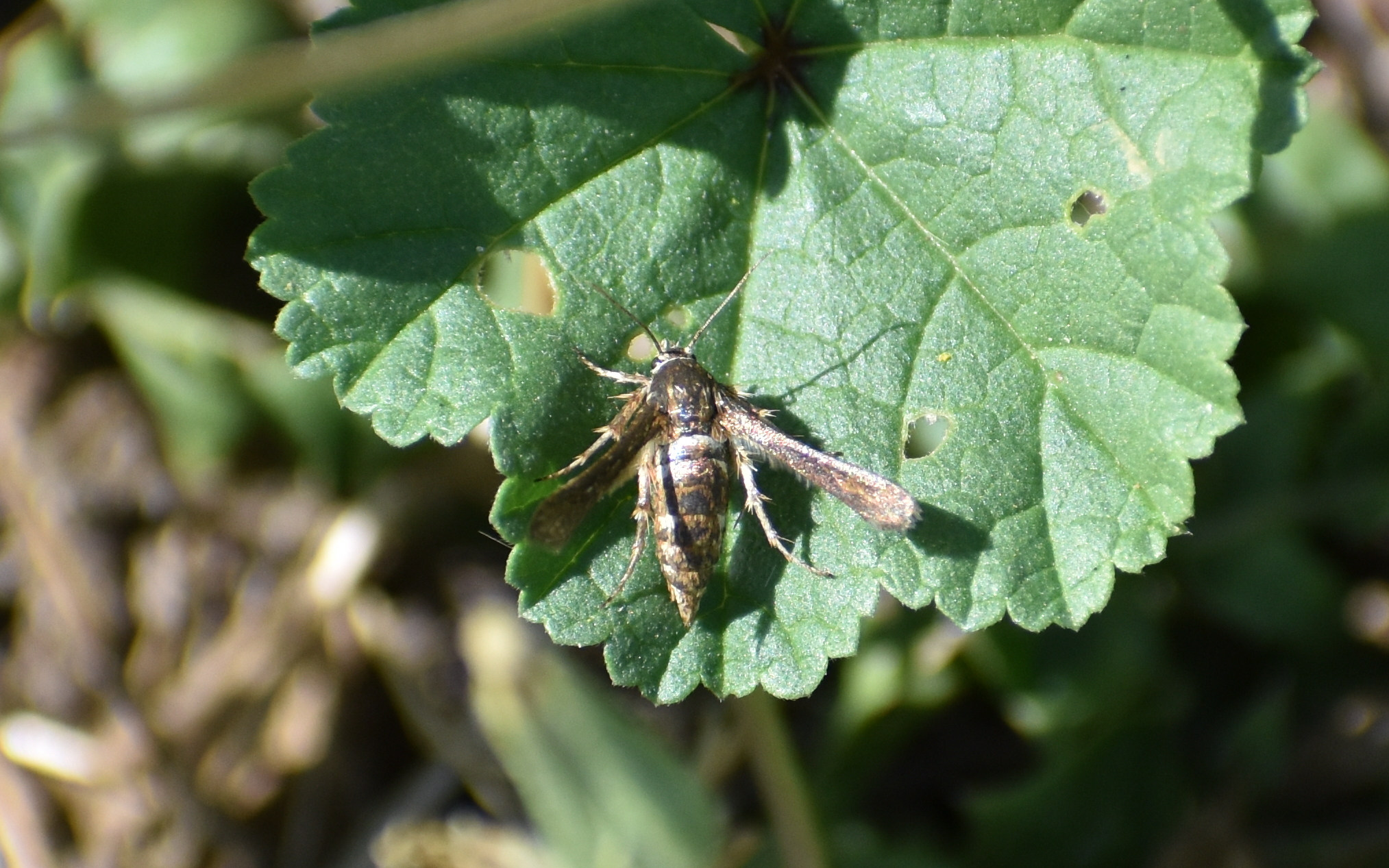

Scientific classification
- Kingdom: Animalia
- Phylum: Arthropoda
- Clade: Pancrustacea
- Class: Insecta
- Order: Lepidoptera
- Family: Sesiidae
- Genus: Microsphecia
- Species: M. tineiformis

Binomial name
- Microsphecia tineiformis (Esper, [1789])

Synonyms
- Sphinx tineiformis Esper, [1789]; Tinthia tineiformis; Sesia aselliformis Rossi, 1794

= Microsphecia tineiformis =

Species of moth

Microsphecia tineiformis is a moth of the family Sesiidae. It is found in southern Europe. It has also been recorded from Morocco, Algeria, Tunisia, Asia Minor, Armenia and from Azerbaijan to northern Iran and northern Iraq.

The wingspan is about 11 mm.

The larvae feed on Convolvulus species (including Convolvulus boissieri) and possibly Echium vulgare and Echium violaceum.
