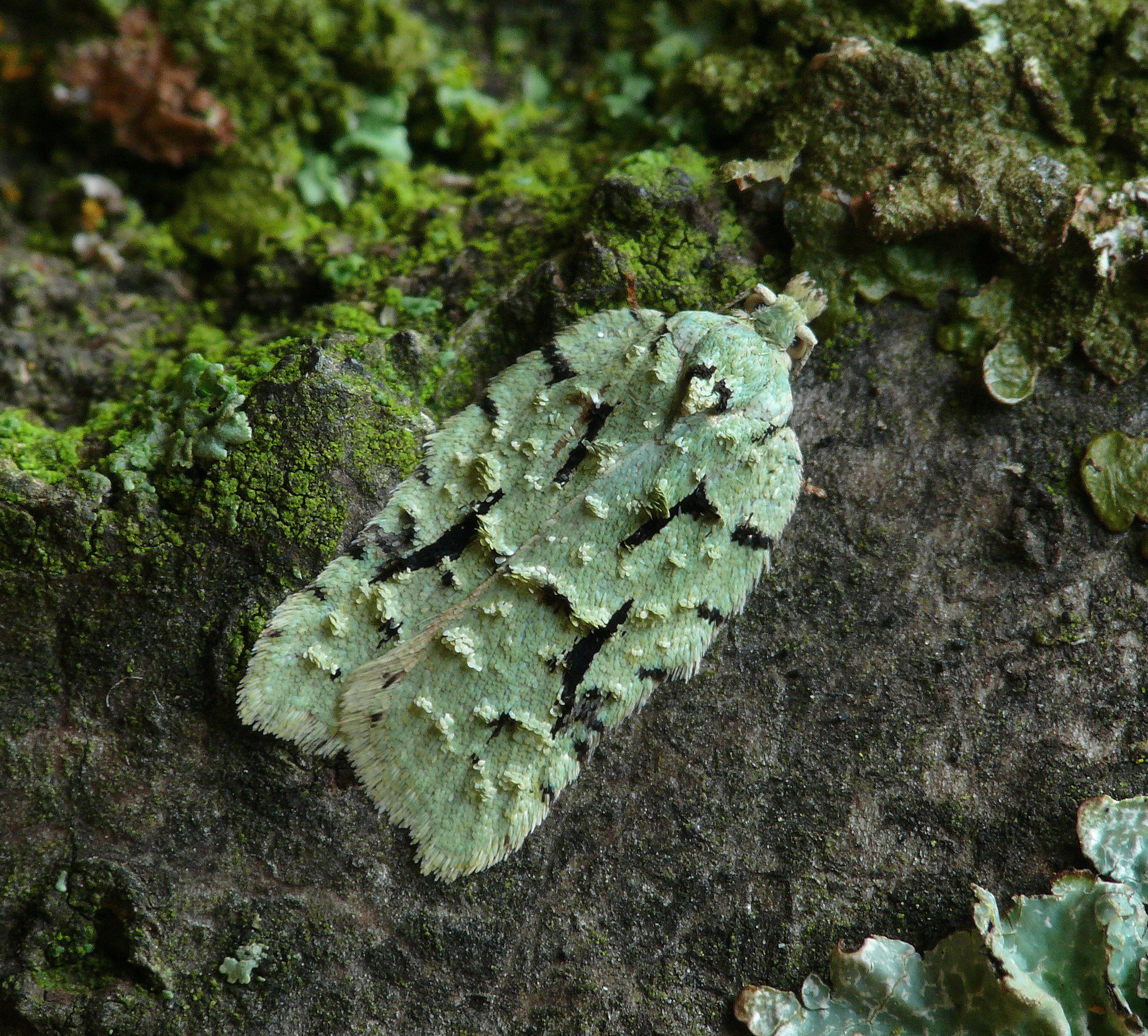

Scientific classification
- Kingdom: Animalia
- Phylum: Arthropoda
- Clade: Pancrustacea
- Class: Insecta
- Order: Lepidoptera
- Family: Tortricidae
- Genus: Acleris
- Species: A. literana

Binomial name
- Acleris literana (Linnaeus, 1758)

Synonyms
- Phalaena (Tortrix) literana Linnaeus, 1758; Oxigrapha abjectana Hübner, [1825] 1816; Acleris literana ab. adustana Bradley, 1962; Oxigrapha aerugana Hübner, [1825] 1816; Tortrix asperana [Denis & Schiffermüller], 1775; Oxigrapha literana ab. brunneana Sheldon, 1931; Acleris literana ab. dorsomaculana Bradley, 1962; Acleris literana ab. dorsosquamana Bradley, 1962; Oxigrapha literana ab. flavana Sheldon, 1921; Oxigrapha literana ab. fulvana Sheldon, 1931; Acleris literana ab. fulvirrorana Bradley, 1962; Acleris literana ab. fulvodorsana Bradley, 1962; Oxigrapha literana ab. fulvoliterana Sheldon, 1921; Oxigrapha literana ab. fulvomaculana Sheldon, 1921; Leptogramma fulvomixtana Stephens, 1834; Oxigrapha literana ab. griseana Sheldon, 1921; Tortrix irrorana Hübner, [1796-1799]; Leptogramma irrorana; Acleris literana ab. irroroliterana Bradley, 1962; Oxigrapha literana ab. mixtana Sheldon, 1921; Acalla literana ssp. multipunctata Schawerda, 1936; Acalla literana ab. nigrofasciana Preissecker, 1913; Acleris literana ab. nigroliterana Bradley, 1962; Oxigrapha literana ab. nigromaculana Sheldon, 1921; Oxigrapha notatana Hübner, [1825] 1816; Acleris literana ab. olivariana Bradley, 1962; Pyralis romanana Fabricius, 1787; Acalla literana sardivola Schawerda, 1936; Pyralis squamana Fabricius, 1775; Phalaena (Tortrix) squamulana Hübner, 1793; Acleris literana ab. subfulvoliterana Bradley, 1962; Acleris literana ab. subfulvomixtana Bradley, 1962; Acleris literana ab. subliterana Bradley, 1962; Oxigrapha literana ab. suffusana Sheldon, 1921; Tortrix tricolorana Haworth, [1811]

= Acleris literana =

Species of moth

Acleris literana, the sprinkled rough-wing, is a moth of the family Tortricidae. The species was first described by Carl Linnaeus in his 1758 10th edition of Systema Naturae. It is found in most of Europe and in the Near East.

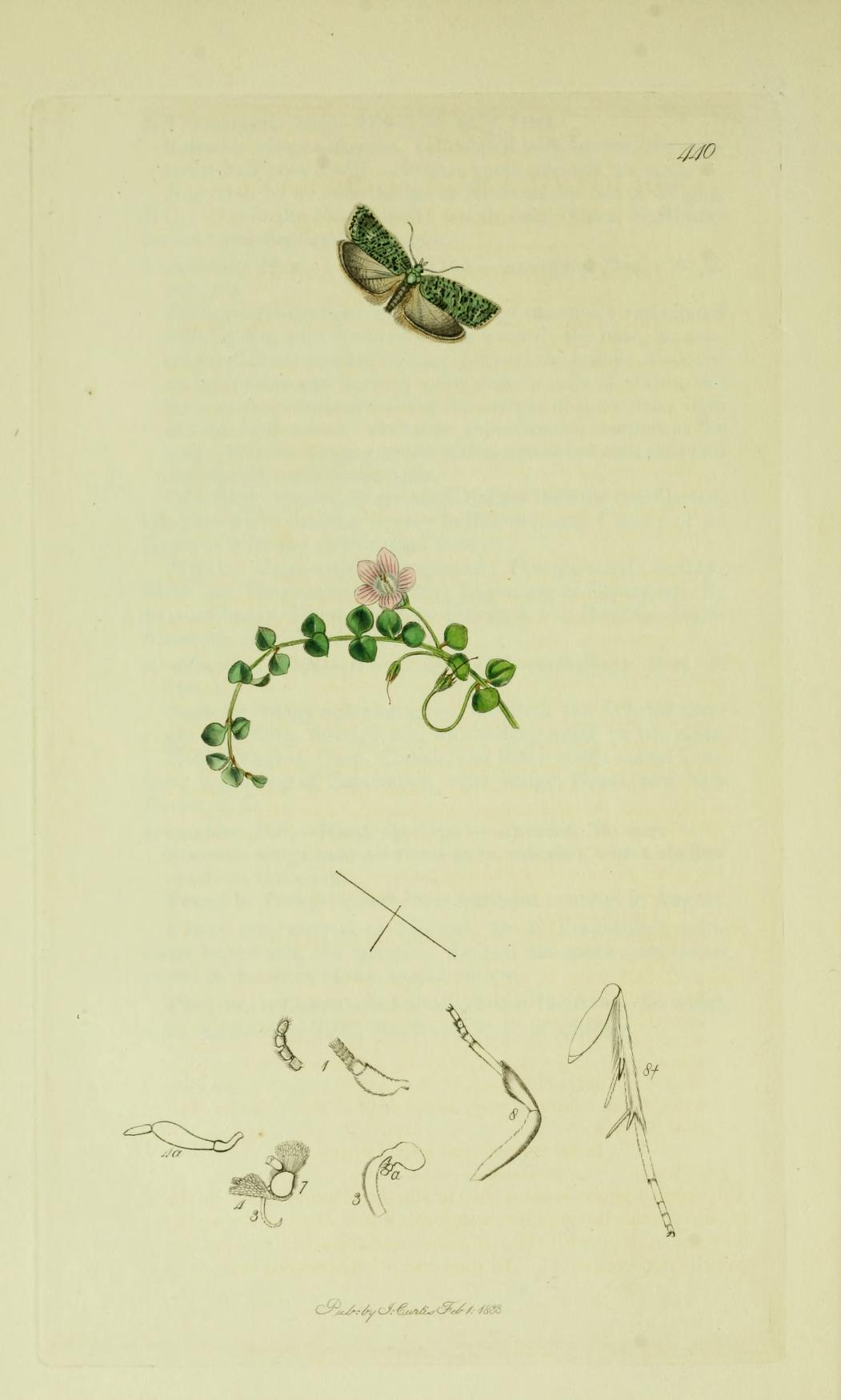
Illustration from John Curtis's British Entomology Volume 6

Thorax with strong posterior crest. Forewings oblong, pale green, sometimes mixed or strigulated with grey; tufts numerous; usually some irregular scattered black marks; sometimes with ochreous spots or suffusions in disc, or suffused blackish spots. Hindwings grey, darker towards apex. It is a variable species and many different forms have been described, but all have a combination of blackish and whitish markings on a pale green ground. Julius von Kennel provides a full description.

The wingspan is 18–21 mm (0.71–0.83 in). Adults are on wing from August to September and again from April to May after overwintering as an adult.

The larvae feed on Quercus species. They live between leaves spun together with silk.

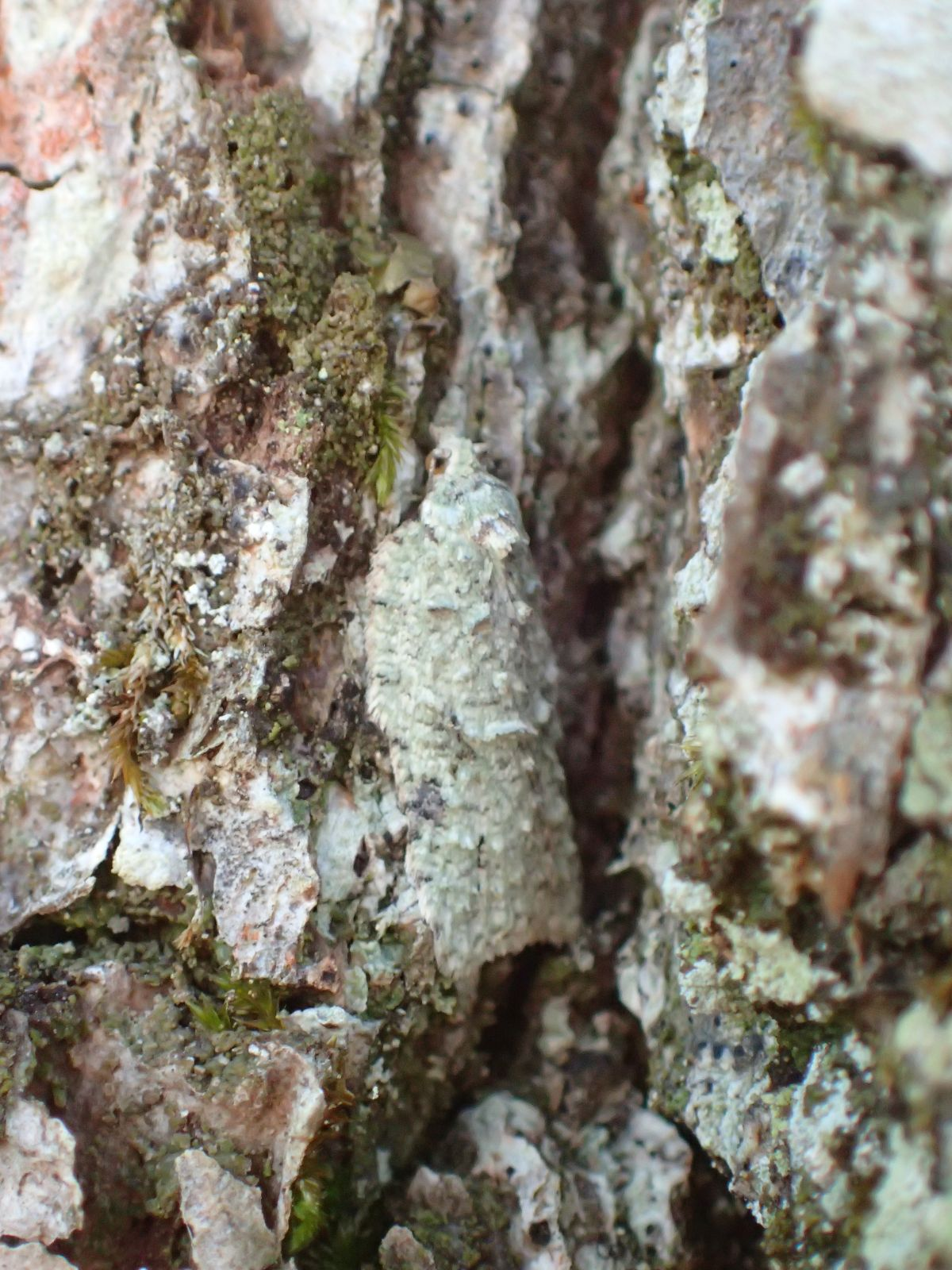

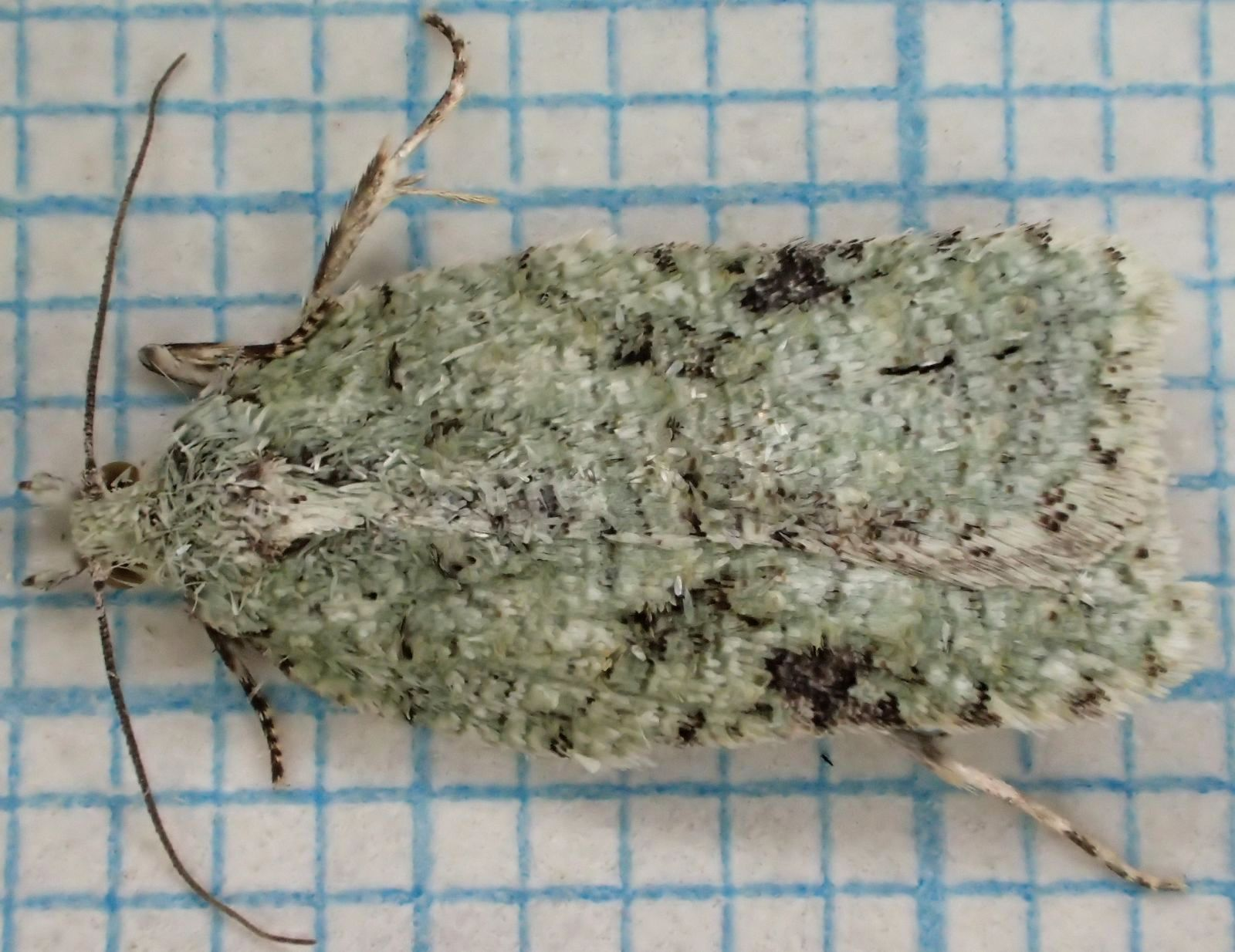
