= Scythris acarioides =

Scientific classification
- Kingdom: Animalia
- Phylum: Arthropoda
- Clade: Pancrustacea
- Class: Insecta
- Order: Lepidoptera
- Family: Scythrididae
- Genus: Scythris
- Species: S. acarioides

Binomial name
- Scythris acarioides Bengtsson, 1997

Species of moth

Scythris acarioides is a moth of the family Scythrididae. It was described by Bengt Å. Bengtsson in 1997. It is found in Italy.

== Etymology ==
The species name refers to the "sclerotized formation of sternum 7, reminiscent of a tick (belonging to the order Acari)".
