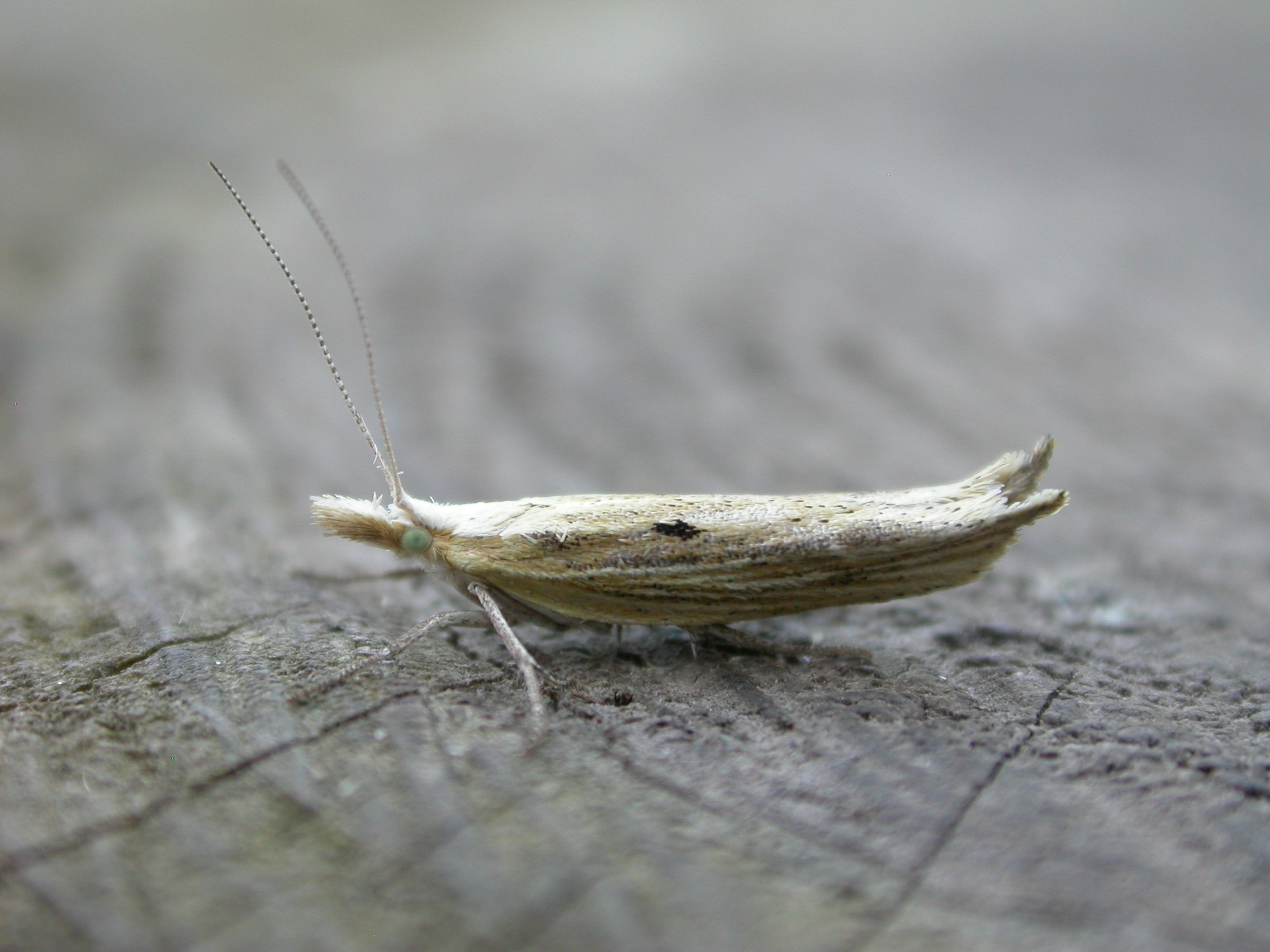

Scientific classification
- Kingdom: Animalia
- Phylum: Arthropoda
- Class: Insecta
- Order: Lepidoptera
- Family: Ypsolophidae
- Genus: Ypsolopha
- Species: Y. nemorella

Binomial name
- Ypsolopha nemorella (Linnaeus, 1758)

Synonyms
- Phalaena nemorella Linnaeus, 1758; Tinea hamella Hübner, 1805; Ypsolophus cultrea Haworth, 1828; Cerostoma nemorella var. ninella Krulikovski, 1908

= Ypsolopha nemorella =

Species of moth

Ypsolopha nemorella is a moth of the family Ypsolophidae. It is found in northern and central Europe, mid-eastern China and Russia.

The wingspan is 21–24 mm. Adults are on wing from July to August. It is one of the larger species in the genus Ypsolopha. It has a distinct dark spot on the creamy forewing. Meyrick describes it- Head and thorax ochreous whitish, patagia light ochreous. Forewings with apex falcate;whitish -ochreous, more or less brownish -tinged between veins, with scattered black scales; a darker brownish streak along fold; a black dot below fold before middle. Hindwings pale grey, darker terminally. The larvarosy-ochreous; dorsal line whitish; 7 and 9 with oblique black lateral marks.

The larvae feed on Lonicera species.
