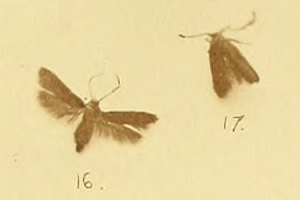

Scientific classification
- Kingdom: Animalia
- Phylum: Arthropoda
- Class: Insecta
- Order: Lepidoptera
- Family: Scythrididae
- Genus: Scythris
- Species: S. alseriella

Binomial name
- Scythris alseriella (Turati, 1879)

Synonyms
- Butalis alseriella Turati, 1879

= Scythris alseriella =

Species of moth

Scythris alseriella is a moth of the family Scythrididae. It was described by Turati in 1879. It is found in Armenia, northern Italy and Switzerland.
