= Scythris aerariella =

Scientific classification
- Kingdom: Animalia
- Phylum: Arthropoda
- Class: Insecta
- Order: Lepidoptera
- Family: Scythrididae
- Genus: Scythris
- Species: S. aerariella

Binomial name
- Scythris aerariella (Herrich-Schäffer, 1855)

Synonyms
- Oecophora aerariella Herrich-Schäffer, 1855

Species of moth

Scythris aerariella is a moth of the family Scythrididae. It was described by Gottlieb August Wilhelm Herrich-Schäffer in 1855. It is found in Bosnia-Herzegovina, Bulgaria, Croatia, the Republic of Macedonia, Greece, Hungary and Italy. It has also been recorded from Turkey.
