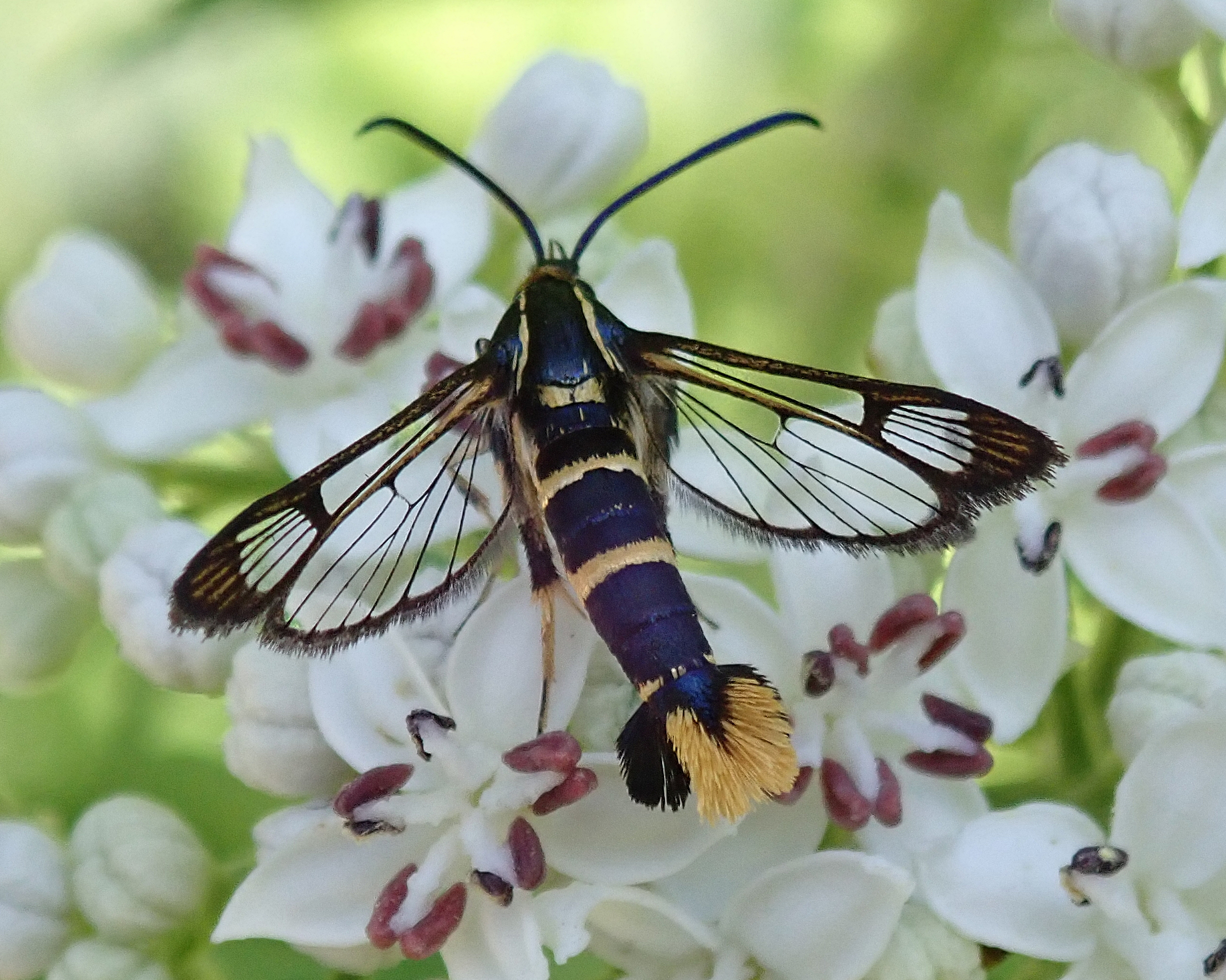
- female

Scientific classification
- Kingdom: Animalia
- Phylum: Arthropoda
- Clade: Pancrustacea
- Class: Insecta
- Order: Lepidoptera
- Family: Sesiidae
- Genus: Synanthedon
- Species: S. loranthi

Binomial name
- Synanthedon loranthi (Kralicek, 1966)

Synonyms
- Aegeria loranthi Kralicek, 1966; Aegeria cryptica Králícek & Povolný, 1977

= Synanthedon loranthi =

Species of moth

Synanthedon loranthi is a moth of the family Sesiidae. It is found in most of Europe (except Ireland, Great Britain, Fennoscandia, the Netherlands, Portugal, the Baltic region and Ukraine) and Asia Minor.

The wingspan is 20–22 mm.

The larvae feed on Viscum album, Viscum album abietis, Viscum album austriacum, Viscum laxum and Loranthus europaeus.
