= Scythris bolognella =

Scientific classification
- Kingdom: Animalia
- Phylum: Arthropoda
- Class: Insecta
- Order: Lepidoptera
- Family: Scythrididae
- Genus: Scythris
- Species: S. bolognella

Binomial name
- Scythris bolognella Jäckh, 1978

Species of moth

Scythris bolognella is a moth of the family Scythrididae. It was described by Jäckh in 1978. It is found in Italy.
