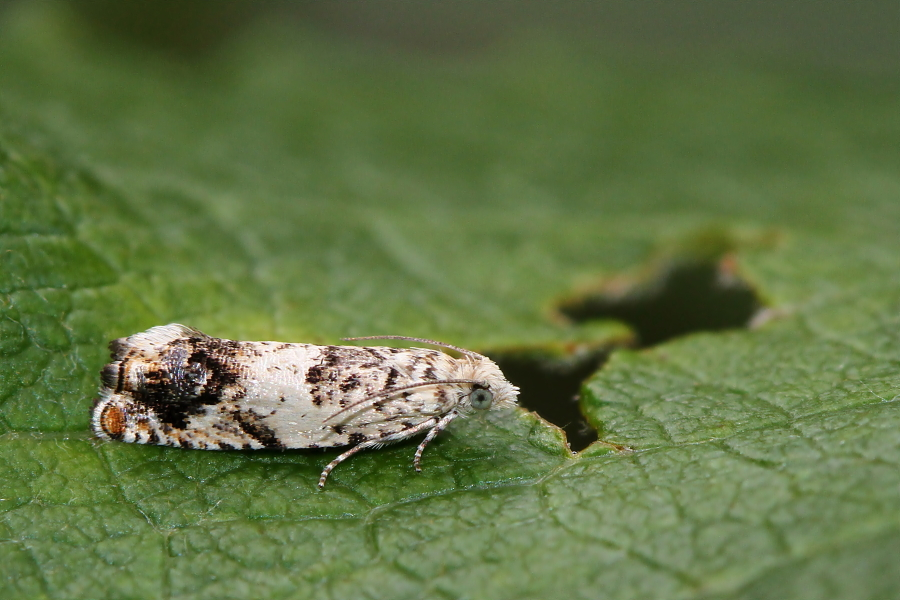
- Epinotia subocellana

Scientific classification
- Kingdom: Animalia
- Phylum: Arthropoda
- Class: Insecta
- Order: Lepidoptera
- Family: Tortricidae
- Genus: Epinotia
- Species: E. subocellana

Binomial name
- Epinotia subocellana (Donovan, 1806)

Synonyms
- Phalaena subocellana Donovan, 1806; Grapholitha campoliana Treitschke, 1830

= Epinotia subocellana =

Species of moth

Epinotia subocellana is a species of moth of the family Tortricidae. It is found in Asia and Europe and was first described by Edward Donovan in 1806.

== Life cycle ==
The male and female moths are similar with a wingspan of 10–14 mm. The head is ochreous-white. The forewings are ochreous-white, the costa and dorsum strigulated with dark fuscous. The basal patch is striated with black, interrupted near costa, and the edge obtusely angulated. The central fascia is mixed with pale ferruginous, leaden-metallic, and black, narrowly interrupted above middle. The ocellus is leaden metallic, with a central series of connected black marks. The apex has ferruginous and leaden-metallic striae. The termen is sinuate. The hindwings are fuscous, darker terminally, The larva is pale green; head yellow -brown. The moths fly from May to July at dusk and come to light.

=== Ovum ===
Eggs are laid on rough-leaved willows (Salix species).

=== Larva ===
Larvae have a yellowish or greenish-white body and a yellowish-brown head. The prothoracic and anal plates are pale yellow. They live in a sandwich of two leaves spun together, feeding on the underside of the upper leaf, from August to October. Foodplants include eared willow (S. aurita), grey willow (S. cinerea) and goat willow (S. caprea).

=== Pupa ===
When fully fed the larva descends to the ground and overwinters in a cocoon. The pupa forms in April or May, is yellowish-brown and can be found in detritus.

== Distribution ==
Found from western, northern and central Europe through to eastern Russia.
