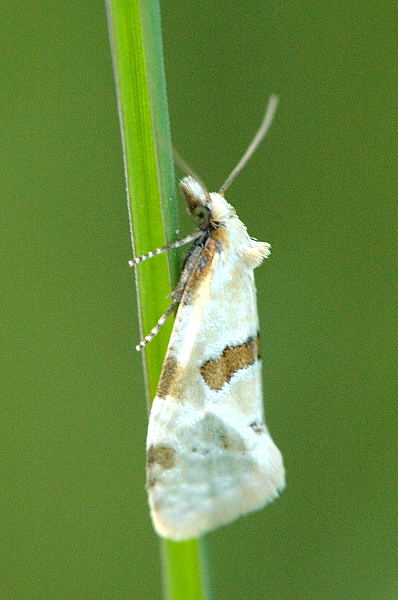

Scientific classification
- Kingdom: Animalia
- Phylum: Arthropoda
- Clade: Pancrustacea
- Class: Insecta
- Order: Lepidoptera
- Family: Tortricidae
- Genus: Aethes
- Species: A. cnicana

Binomial name
- Aethes cnicana (Westwood, 1854)

Synonyms
- Argyrolepia cnicana Westwood, in Wood, 1854; Phalonia arcticana Brandt, 1937

= Aethes cnicana =

Species of moth

Aethes cnicana is a moth of the family Tortricidae. It was described by John O. Westwood in 1854. It is found in Europe, Japan, Korea, Russia, northern China (Beijing, Heilongjiang, Inner Mongolia, Jilin, Liaoning, Tianjin), and Taiwan.

== Description ==
The wingspan is 14–17 mm (0.55–0.67 in). Very similar to Ancylis badiana but differs as follows: forewings with markings bright ferruginous-brown, antemedian fascia less angulated, less distinctly interrupted, not dilated on dorsum. Julius von Kennel provides a full description.

== Ecology ==
The moth flies from May to August and are often attracted to light. The larvae feed on Cirsium and Carduus.
