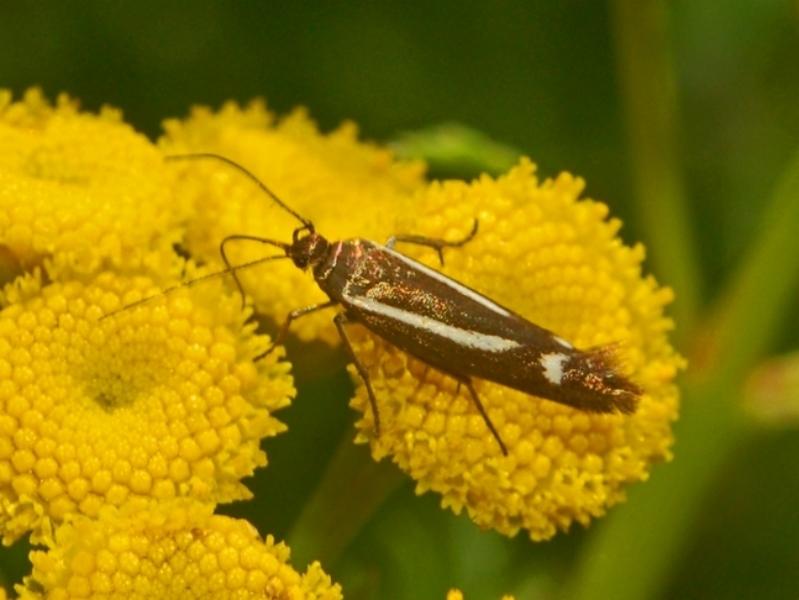

Scientific classification
- Kingdom: Animalia
- Phylum: Arthropoda
- Class: Insecta
- Order: Lepidoptera
- Family: Scythrididae
- Genus: Scythris
- Species: S. heinemanni

Binomial name
- Scythris heinemanni (Möschler, 1869)

Synonyms
- Butalis heinemanni Möschler, 1869; Butalis ossianella Millière, 1874

= Scythris heinemanni =

Species of moth

Scythris heinemanni is a flower moth of the family Scythrididae and it is included in the knochella species group. It is found in mainland of France and Italy.

The wingspan is about 15 mm. Adults are on wing in June, July and August.

The larvae feed on Origanum vulgare and Silene nutans.
