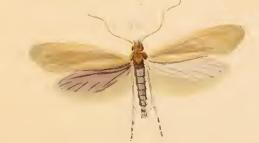
- Myrmecozela ochraceella

Scientific classification
- Kingdom: Animalia
- Phylum: Arthropoda
- Clade: Pancrustacea
- Class: Insecta
- Order: Lepidoptera
- Family: Tineidae
- Subfamily: Myrmecozelinae; Căpuşe, 1968

Type genus
- Myrmecozela Zeller, 1852

Synonyms
- Haplotineinae; Phthoropoeinae Gozmány & Vári, 1973; Rhodobatinae Căpuşe, 1968

= Myrmecozelinae =

Subfamily of moths

The Myrmecozelinae are a subfamily of moth of the family Tineidae.

== Genera ==
- Ateliotum
- Analytarcha
- Cephimallota
  - syn. Anemallota
  - syn. Aphimallota
  - syn. Cephitinea
- Cinnerethica
- Contralissa
- Coryptilum
- Criticonoma
- Dicanica
- Dinica
- Drosica
- Ellochotis
- Endromarmata
- Euagophleps
- Exoplisis
- Gerontha
- Haplotinea (tentatively placed here)
- Ippa
- Ischnuridia
- Janseana
- Machaeropteris
- Mesopherna
- Metapherna
- Mimoscopa
- Moerarchis
- Myrmecozela
- Pachyarthra
- Pararhodobates
- Phthoropoea
- Platysceptra
- Propachyarthra
- Rhodobates
- Sarocrania
- Scalmatica
- Timaea
- Tineovertex
- Tracheloteina
