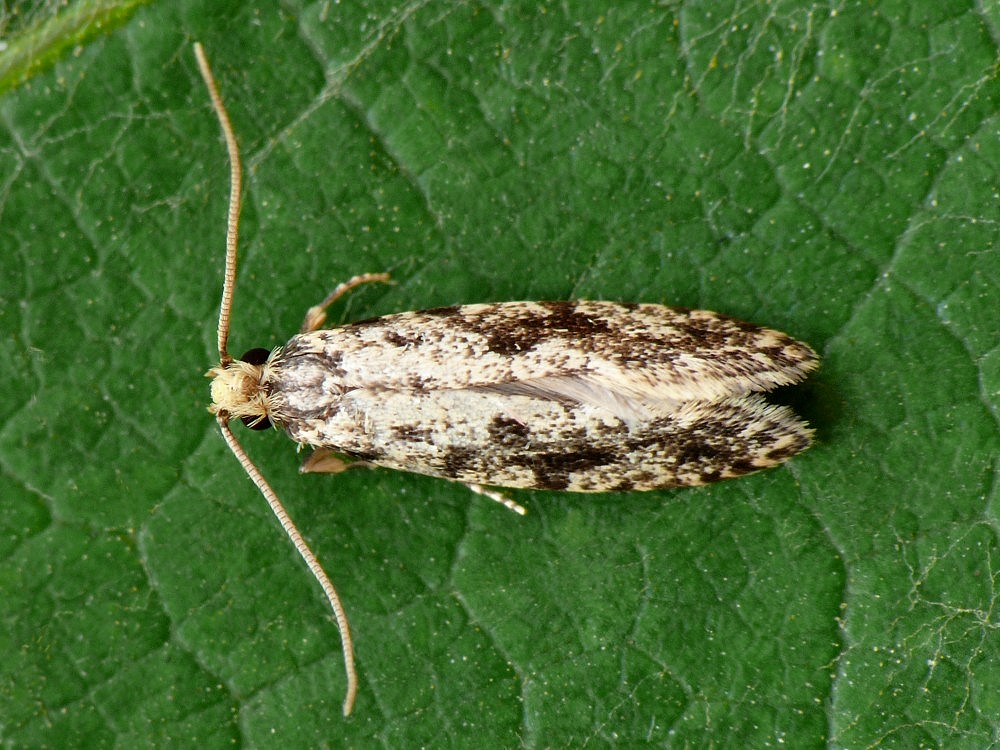
- Nemapogon granella

Scientific classification
- Kingdom: Animalia
- Phylum: Arthropoda
- Class: Insecta
- Order: Lepidoptera
- Family: Tineidae
- Subfamily: Nemapogoninae; Hinton, 1955

= Nemapogoninae =

Subfamily of fungus moths

Nemapogoninae is a fungus moth subfamily of the family Tineidae. It was described by Hinton in 1955.

== Genera ==
- Archinemapogon
- Dinica
- Emmochlista
- Gaedikeia
- Hyladaula
- Nemapogon
- Nemaxera
- Neurothaumasia
- Peritrana
- Triaxomasia
- Triaxomera
- Vanna
