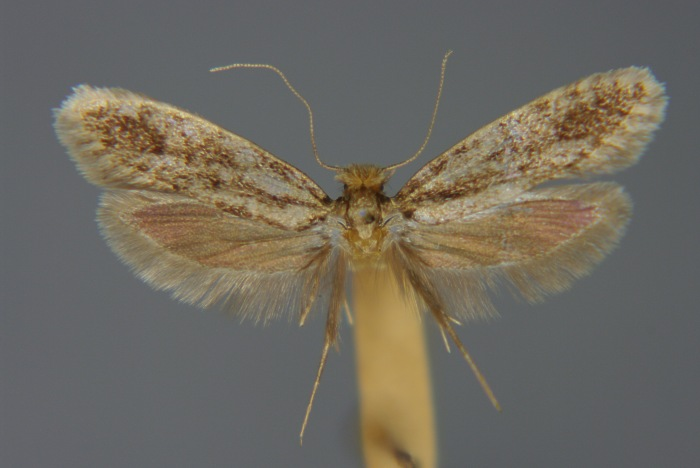

Scientific classification
- Kingdom: Animalia
- Phylum: Arthropoda
- Clade: Pancrustacea
- Class: Insecta
- Order: Lepidoptera
- Family: Tineidae
- Subfamily: Myrmecozelinae
- Genus: Haplotinea; Diakonoff & Hinton, 1956

Type species
- Tinea insectella Fabricius, 1794

= Haplotinea =

Genus of moths

Haplotinea is a very small genus of fungus moths (family Tineidae). Its subfamily among the fungus moths is disputed – many assign it to the Myrmecozelinae, but other authors have placed it in subfamily Nemapogoninae or Perissomasticinae. In all, its relationships are barely better resolved at present than those of the many Tineidae incertae sedis.

Only two species are placed in Haplotinea at present:

- Haplotinea ditella (Pierce, Diakonoff & Metcalfe, 1938)
- Haplotinea insectella (Fabricius, 1794) (= H. fuscescentella, H. misella, H. rusticella)
