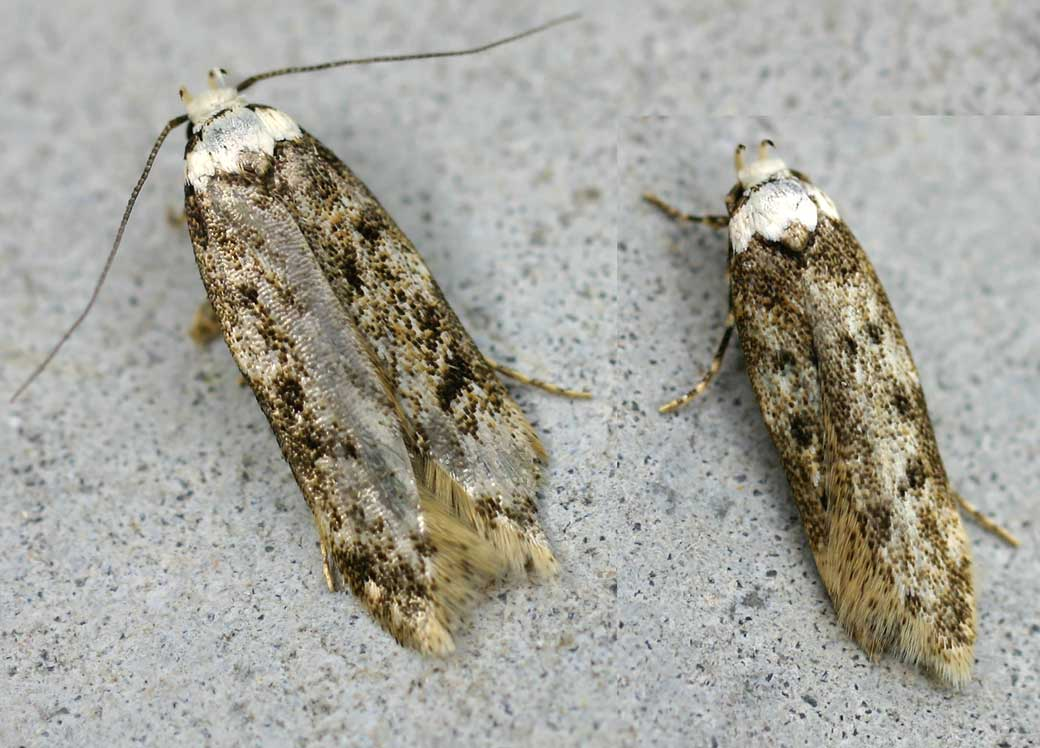
- Adults
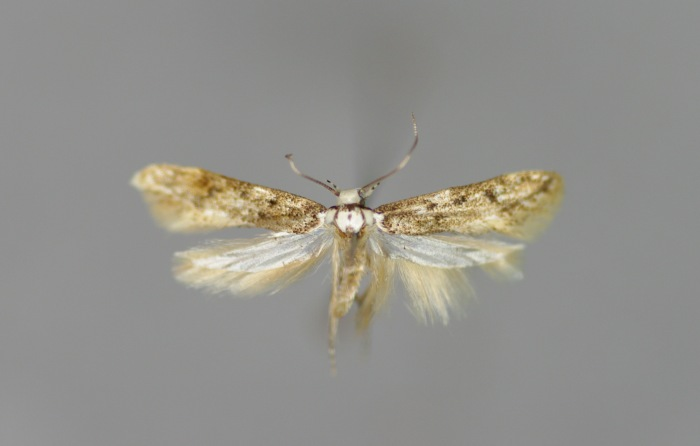
- Mounted male

Scientific classification
- Kingdom: Animalia
- Phylum: Arthropoda
- Clade: Pancrustacea
- Class: Insecta
- Order: Lepidoptera
- Family: Oecophoridae
- Subfamily: Oecophorinae
- Tribe: Oecophorini
- Genus: Endrosis; Hübner, 1825
- Species: E. sarcitrella

Binomial name
- Endrosis sarcitrella (Linnaeus, 1758)

Synonyms
- Numerous, see text

= White-shouldered house moth =

Species of moth

The white-shouldered house moth (Endrosis sarcitrella) is a species of gelechioid moth. It belongs to the subfamily Oecophorinae of the concealer moth family (Oecophoridae), just like the brown house moth (Hofmannophila pseudospretella). Though several presumed congeners of E. sarcitrella were described, its genus Endrosis is currently understood to be monotypic.

This moth is a common species, found by now almost worldwide due to its synanthropic habits. It occurs regularly inside buildings, and being continuously-brooded, can be found at any time of year. It frequents light sources, and can be found in outbuildings where dried food such as grain is kept. It also inhabits birds nests.

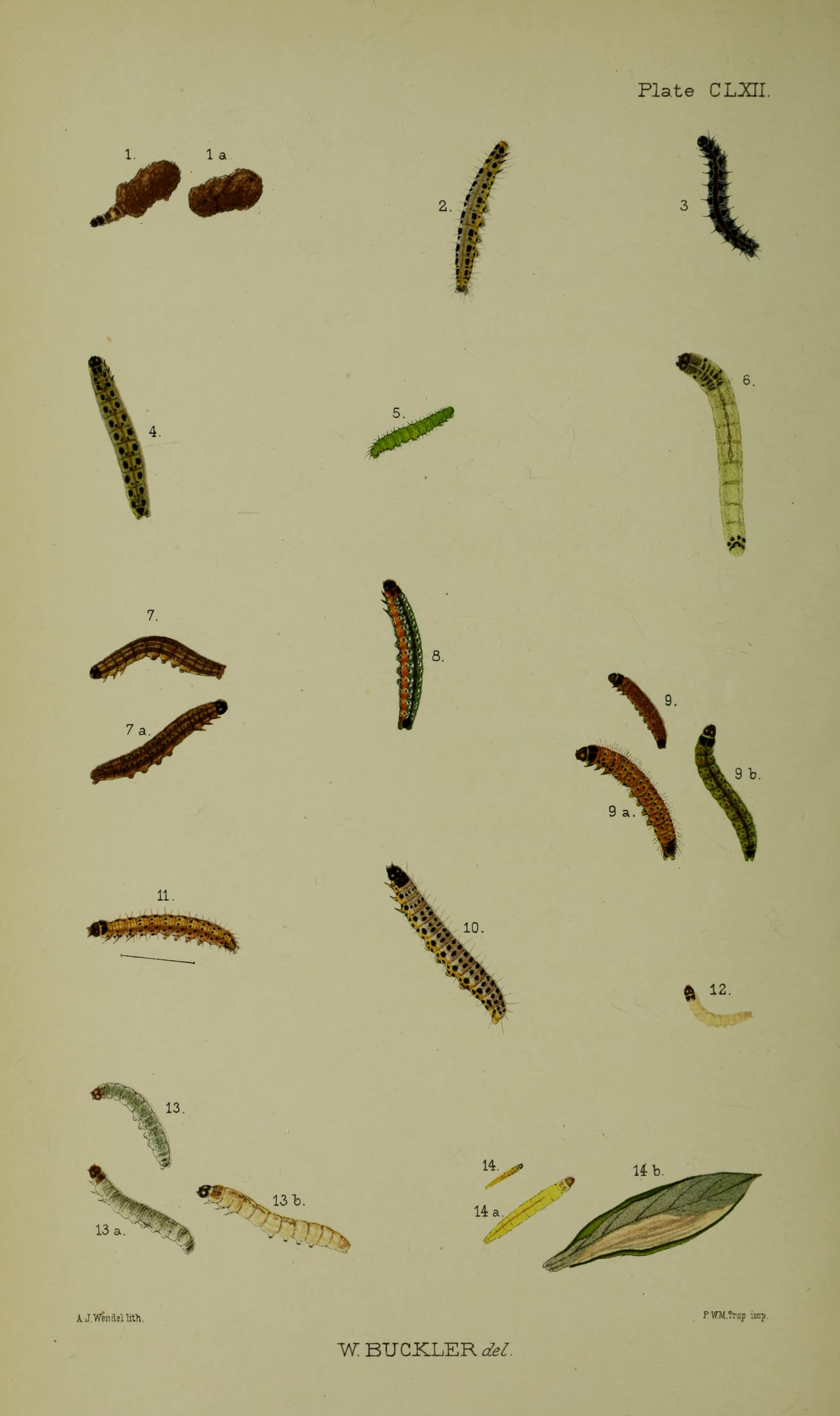
Fig. 12 larva after final moult

The larva is a little grub-like caterpillar and lives on dry plant and animal debris, where it spins itself a small silken hideout. Recorded foodstuffs include dried fruits, cereals (including bran and flour) and other seeds, potatoes, rotting wood, and even insect specimens, wool and old textiles, and guano.

== Taxonomy ==
As type species of Endrosis, the white-shouldered house moth was originally included in the genus when it was established (by Jacob Hübner in 1825) as Alucita betulinella, a scientific name established by Johan Christian Fabricius under this name in 1787. But Hübner had misidentified Fabricius' species, which was in reality a tineid moth known today as Nemaxera betulinella. In addition to this case of mistaken identity, the white-shouldered house moth as discussed by Hübner had actually been named Tinea lactella by J. N. C. M. Denis and Ignaz Schiffermüller in 1775. Earlier still, Carl Linnaeus had described the white-shouldered house moth as Phalaena (Tinea) sarcitrella in 1758, but neither Denis and Schiffermüller nor Hübner did remember it. Later authors, who were aware of the earlier descriptions, supposed the taxon of Denis and Schiffermüller or that of Linnaeus to be this type of Endrosis.

Hübner, however, believed to have identified his white-shouldered house moths correctly with Fabricius' A. betulinella and disregarded T. lactella entirely. Thus, the taxon T. lactella (though not the white-shouldered house moth species as a whole) was not included in Endrosis at the genus' inception, and such a change of type species can only be made by the International Commission on Zoological Nomenclature – it is not permitted in the rules of zoological nomenclature to prevent the confusion and misinterpretations of scientific names that was frequent before the early 20th century.

Over the years, a number of supposed close relatives of the white-shouldered house moth were described. Soon enough, they were all grouped in Endrosis. What remained unclear was how many species there were, and whether any forms stood out. With reports of the species accumulating from all over the world, it was eventually realized that this moth must have tagged along Homo sapiens and spread with human habitation since prehistoric times. In this single global gene pool, few if any current authors recognize more than a single species, E. sarcitrella.

=== Synonyms ===
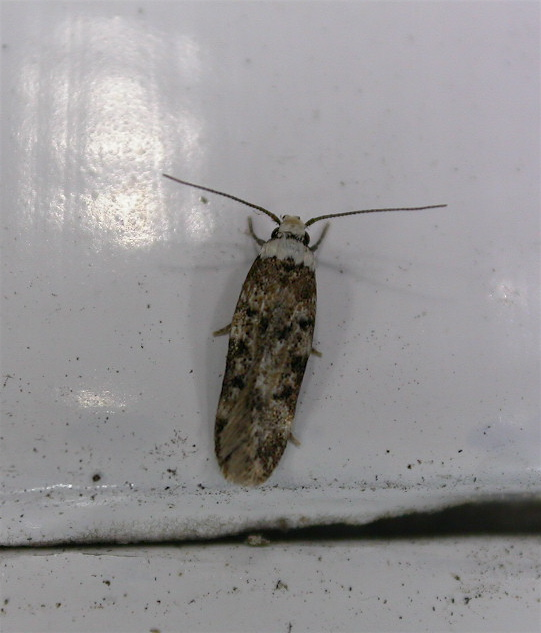
Adult at Browns Bay (New Zealand). White-shouldered house moths from the New Zealand population were once considered a separate species E. subditella, but are not recognizably distinct from European specimens.

Invalid scientific names (junior synonyms and others) of the white-shouldered house moth are:

- Alucita betulinella sensu Hübner, 1796 (non Fabricius, 1787: misidentified)
- Endrosis betulinella (Hübner, 1818–19)
- Endrosis fenestrella (Scopoli, 1763)
- Endrosis kennecottella (lapsus)
- Endrosis kennicottella Clemens, 1860
- Endrosis lacteella (lapsus)
- Endrosis lactella (Denis & Schiffermüller, 1775)
- Endrosis lactella var. antarctica Staudinger, 1899
- Endrosis subditella (Walker, 1864)
- Gelechia subditella Walker, 1864
- Phalaena fenestrella Scopoli, 1763
- Phalaena (Tinea) sarcitrella (Linnaeus, 1758)
- Tinea betulinella sensu Hübner, 1825 (non Fabricius, 1787: misidentified)
- Tinea lacteella (lapsus)
- Tinea lactella Denis & Schiffermüller, 1775

== Behaviour ==
Adults are attracted to light and have been collected via a mercury vapour light trap.
