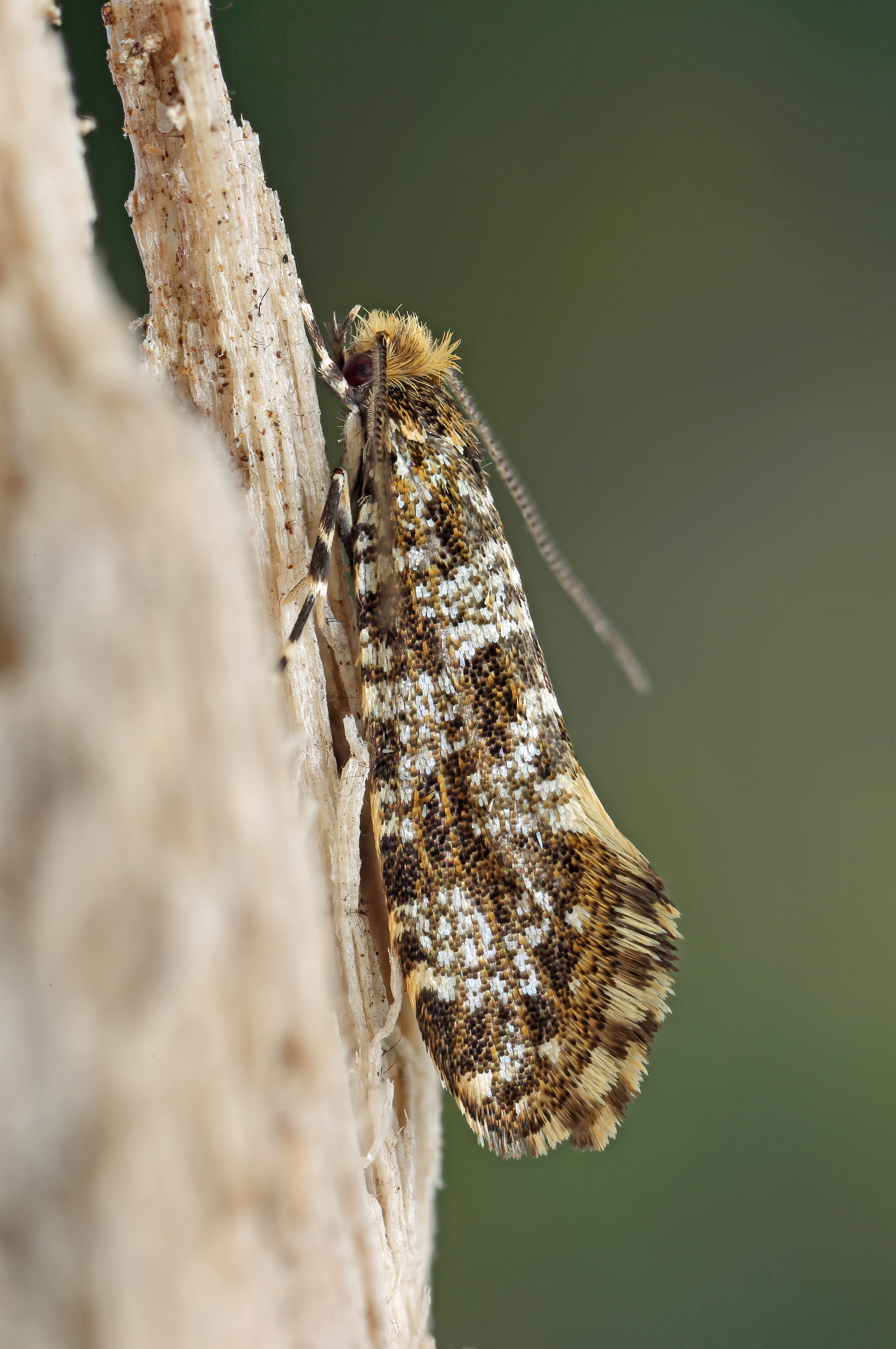
- Adult, England

Scientific classification
- Kingdom: Animalia
- Phylum: Arthropoda
- Clade: Pancrustacea
- Class: Insecta
- Order: Lepidoptera
- Family: Tineidae
- Genus: Triaxomera
- Species: T. parasitella

Binomial name
- Triaxomera parasitella (Hübner, 1796)

Synonyms
- Several, see text

= Triaxomera parasitella =

Species of moth

Triaxomera parasitella is a species of tineoid moth. It belongs to the fungus moth family (Tineidae), and therein to the subfamily Nemapogoninae. It is widespread and common in much of western Eurasia, but seems to be absent from some more outlying regions, such as Portugal and the eastern Baltic, Ireland and Iceland. It has also not been recorded from Slovenia but given that it is found in neighboring countries, it may well occur there unnoticed. Recently, the species was recorded from British Columbia. Generally, it is a moth of warm temperate regions, e.g. in Great Britain it is only a rare and scarce species from the English Midlands northwards.

The adults have a wingspan of 16–21 mm. They are generally nocturnal and can be attracted by light at night. They are on the wing in late spring to early summer, about May to July or starting somewhat earlier, depending on location. Their forewings are predominantly blackish, with irregular white mottling and speckling which results in a rough black zig-zag stripe running along the length of the wings. The forewing border is a hairy fringe colored with alternating black and white. The hindwings are uniformly pale dull grey and have a longer hairy fringe which is colored like the wings proper. The head has a tuft of orange-brown hairs. The caterpillars feed on bracket fungi, in particular Trametes and shiitake (Lentinula edodes), and also on the dead wood these fungi grow on.

== Synonyms ==
Junior synonyms of T. parasitella are:

- Tinea carpinetella Stainton, 1849
- Tinea griseolella Costa, 1836
- Tinea parasitella Hübner, 1796
- Triaxomera carpinetella (Stainton, 1849)
- Triaxomera griseolella (Costa, 1836)
