= Triaxomasia orientanus =

Scientific classification
- Kingdom: Animalia
- Phylum: Arthropoda
- Clade: Pancrustacea
- Class: Insecta
- Order: Lepidoptera
- Family: Tineidae
- Genus: Triaxomasia
- Species: T. orientanus

Binomial name
- Triaxomasia orientanus (Ponomarenko & Park, 1996)

Synonyms
- Ceratuncus orientanus Ponomarenko & Park, 1996

Species of moth

Triaxomasia orientanus is a moth of the family Tineidae first described by Margarita Gennadievna Ponomarenko and Kyu-Tek Park in 1996. It found in Korea and Russia.

The wingspan is about 10 mm.
