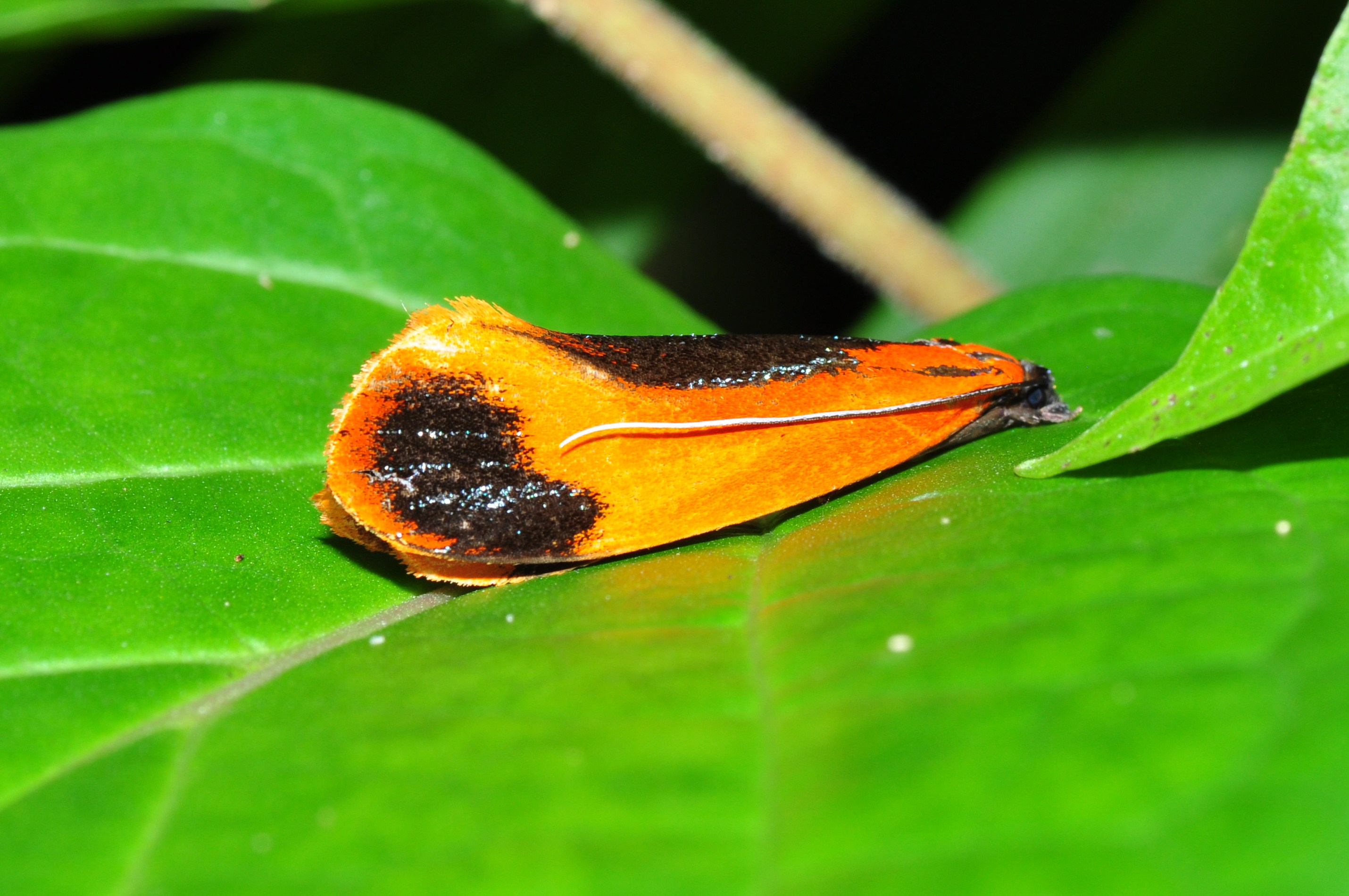
- Coryptilum klugii (cf)

Scientific classification
- Kingdom: Animalia
- Phylum: Arthropoda
- Clade: Pancrustacea
- Class: Insecta
- Order: Lepidoptera
- Family: Tineidae
- Genus: Coryptilum
- Species: C. klugii

Binomial name
- Coryptilum klugii Zeller, 1839

= Coryptilum klugii =

Species of moth

Coryptilum klugii is a species of moth belonging to the family Tineidae. It was described by Philipp Christoph Zeller in 1839.

The species of this genus are dayflying moths of brilliant coloration. Coryptilum klugii are found in Malaysia.
