= Scalmatica constrata =

Scientific classification
- Kingdom: Animalia
- Phylum: Arthropoda
- Class: Insecta
- Order: Lepidoptera
- Family: Tineidae
- Genus: Scalmatica
- Species: S. constrata

Binomial name
- Scalmatica constrata (Meyrick, 1919)

Synonyms
- Latypica constrata Meyrick, 1919

Species of moth

Scalmatica constrata is a moth of the family Tineidae first described by Edward Meyrick in 1919. It is found in Sri Lanka.
