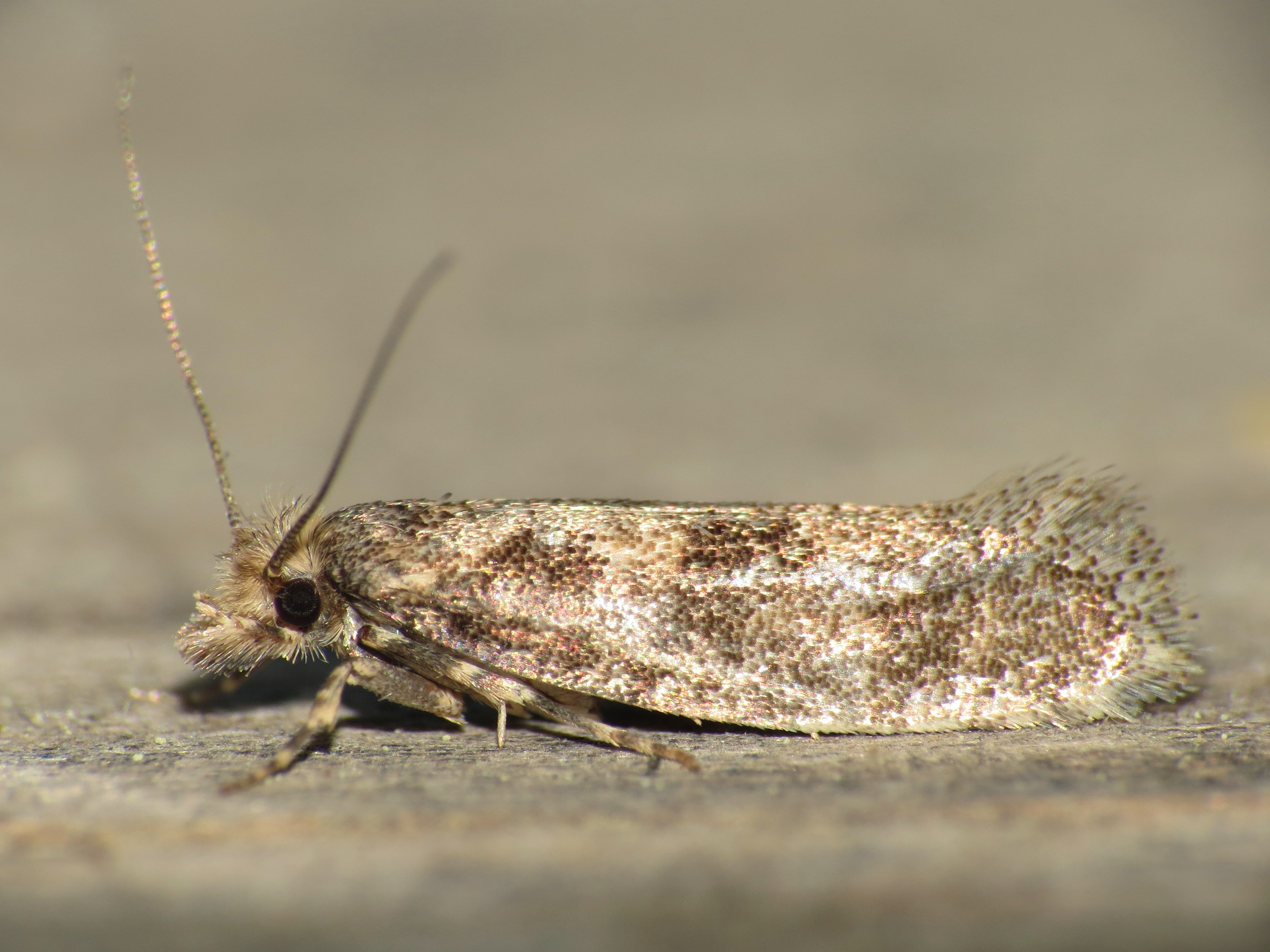
- Ateliotum insulare

Scientific classification
- Kingdom: Animalia
- Phylum: Arthropoda
- Clade: Pancrustacea
- Class: Insecta
- Order: Lepidoptera
- Family: Tineidae
- Subfamily: Myrmecozelinae
- Genus: Ateliotum; Zeller, 1839

Type species
- Ateliotum hungaricellum Zeller, 1839

Diversity
- 13 species

Synonyms
- Numerous, see text

= Ateliotum =

Genus of fungus moth

Ateliotum is a small genus of the fungus moth family, Tineidae. It belongs to the subfamily Myrmecozelinae.

== Species ==
Ateliotum presently contains the following 13 species:

- Ateliotum arabicum Petersen, 1961
- Ateliotum arenbergeri Petersen & Gaedike, 1985 (from Cyprus)
- Ateliotum confusum Petersen, 1966 (from Iran)
- Ateliotum convicta (Meyrick, 1932) (from Ethiopia)
- Ateliotum crymodes (Meyrick, 1908) (from South Africa, Mozambique)
- Ateliotum hungaricellum Zeller, 1839 (= A. cypellias, A. obliterata) (from the Palearctic)
- Ateliotum insularis (Rebel, 1896) (= A. horrealis, A. instratella, A. insulare)
- Ateliotum lusitaniella (Amsel, 1955)
- Ateliotum parvum Petersen, 1988 (from Iran)
- Ateliotum petrinella (Herrich-Schäffer, 1854) (= A. turatiella)
  - Ateliotum petrinella orientale Petersen, 1973 (from the Palearctic)
- Ateliotum reluctans (Meyrick, 1921) (from Zimbabwe)
- Ateliotum resurgens (Gozmány, 1969) (from Tanzania)
- Ateliotum syriaca (Caradja, 1920) (= A. taurensis)

== Synonyms ==
Junior synonyms of Ateliotum are:

- Craterombris Meyrick, 1921
- Dysmasia Herrich-Schaffer 1853
- Hylophygas Meyrick, 1932
- Hyoprora Meyrick, 1908
- Metarsiora Meyrick, 1937
- Saridocompsa Meyrick 1937
