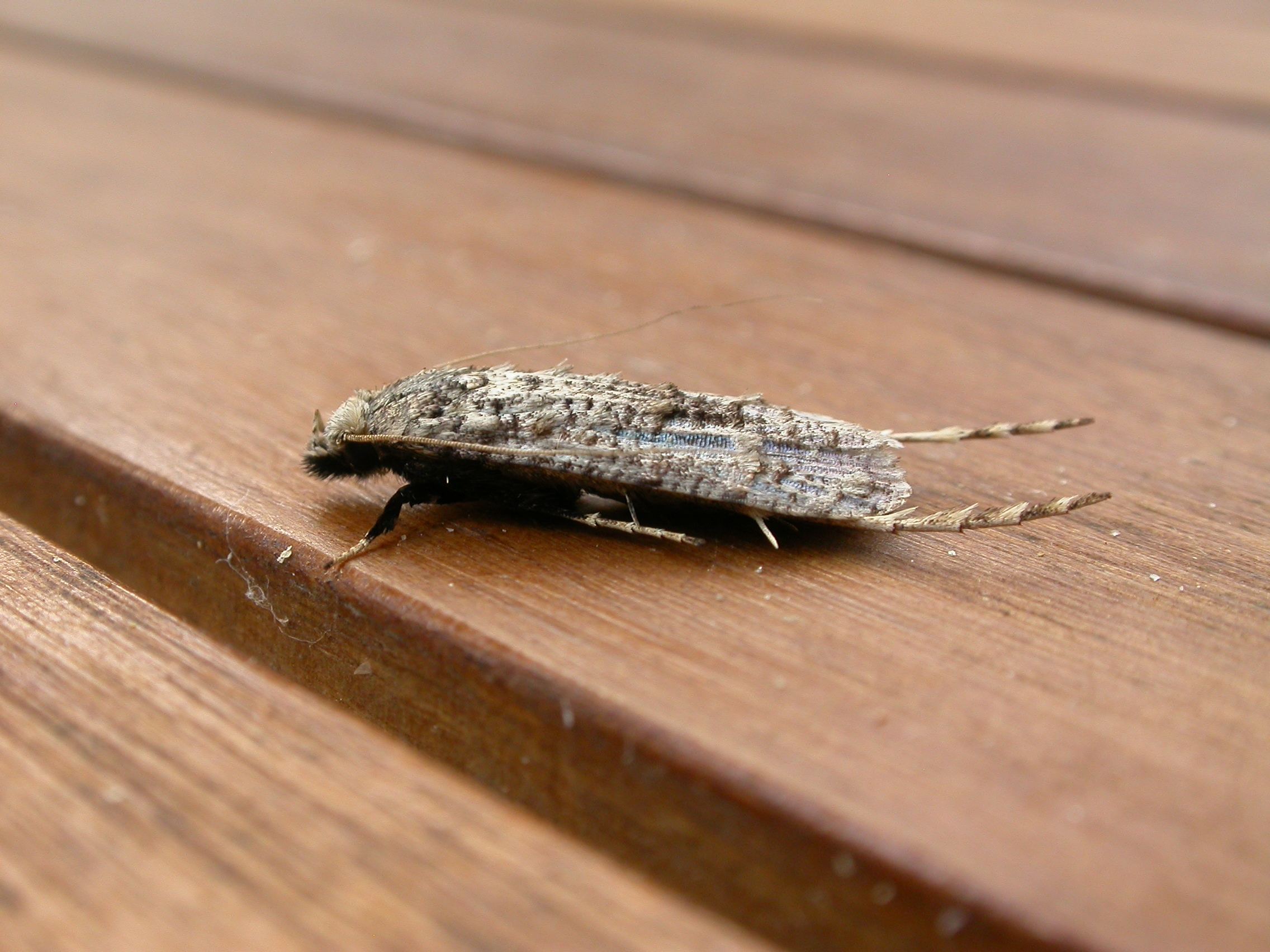

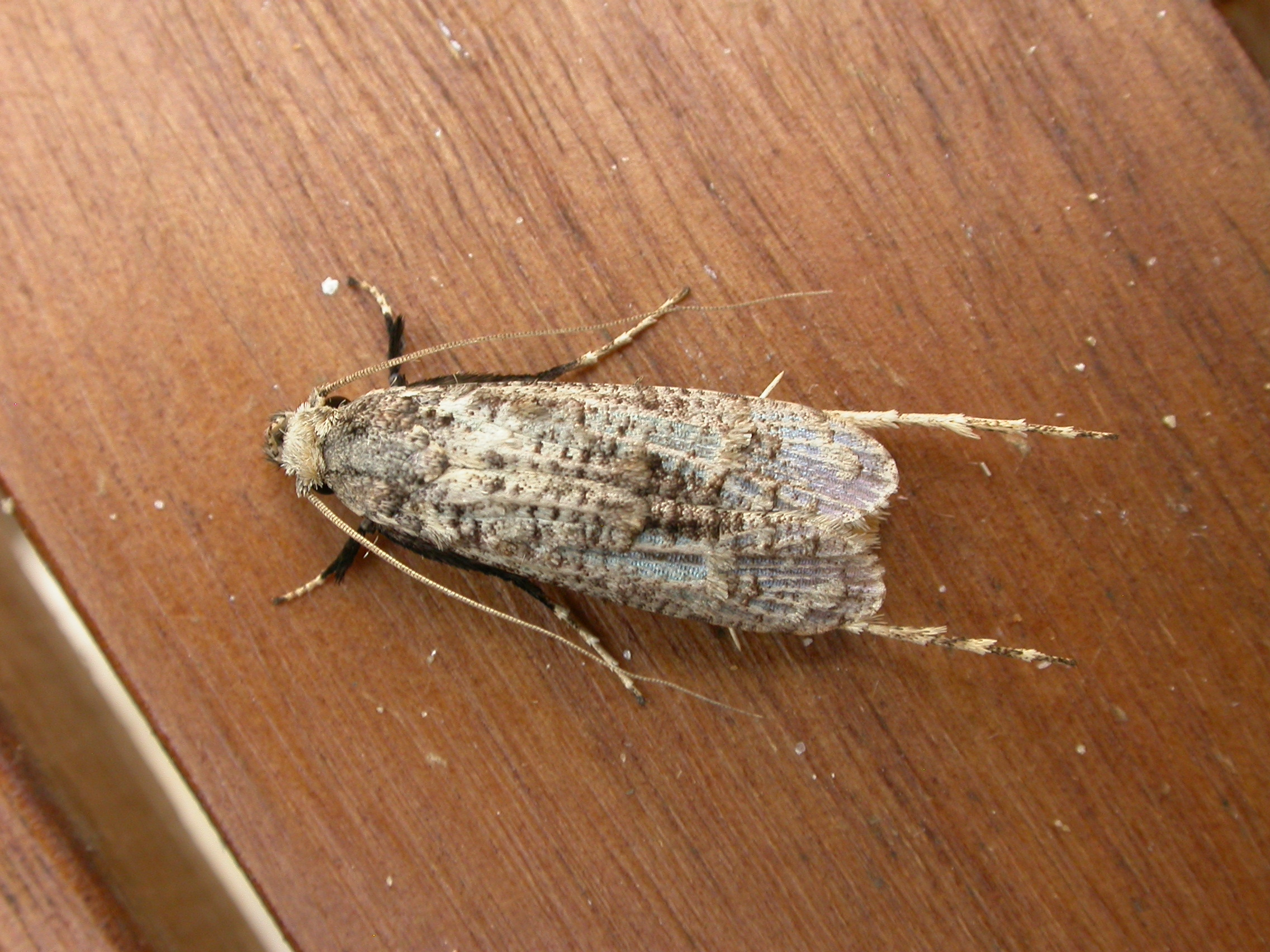

Scientific classification
- Kingdom: Animalia
- Phylum: Arthropoda
- Class: Insecta
- Order: Lepidoptera
- Family: Tineidae
- Genus: Gerontha
- Species: G. acrosthenia

Binomial name
- Gerontha acrosthenia Zagulajev, 1972

= Gerontha acrosthenia =

Species of moth

Gerontha acrosthenia is a species of moth of the family Tineidae. It is found in northern Australia (including Queensland) and New Guinea.

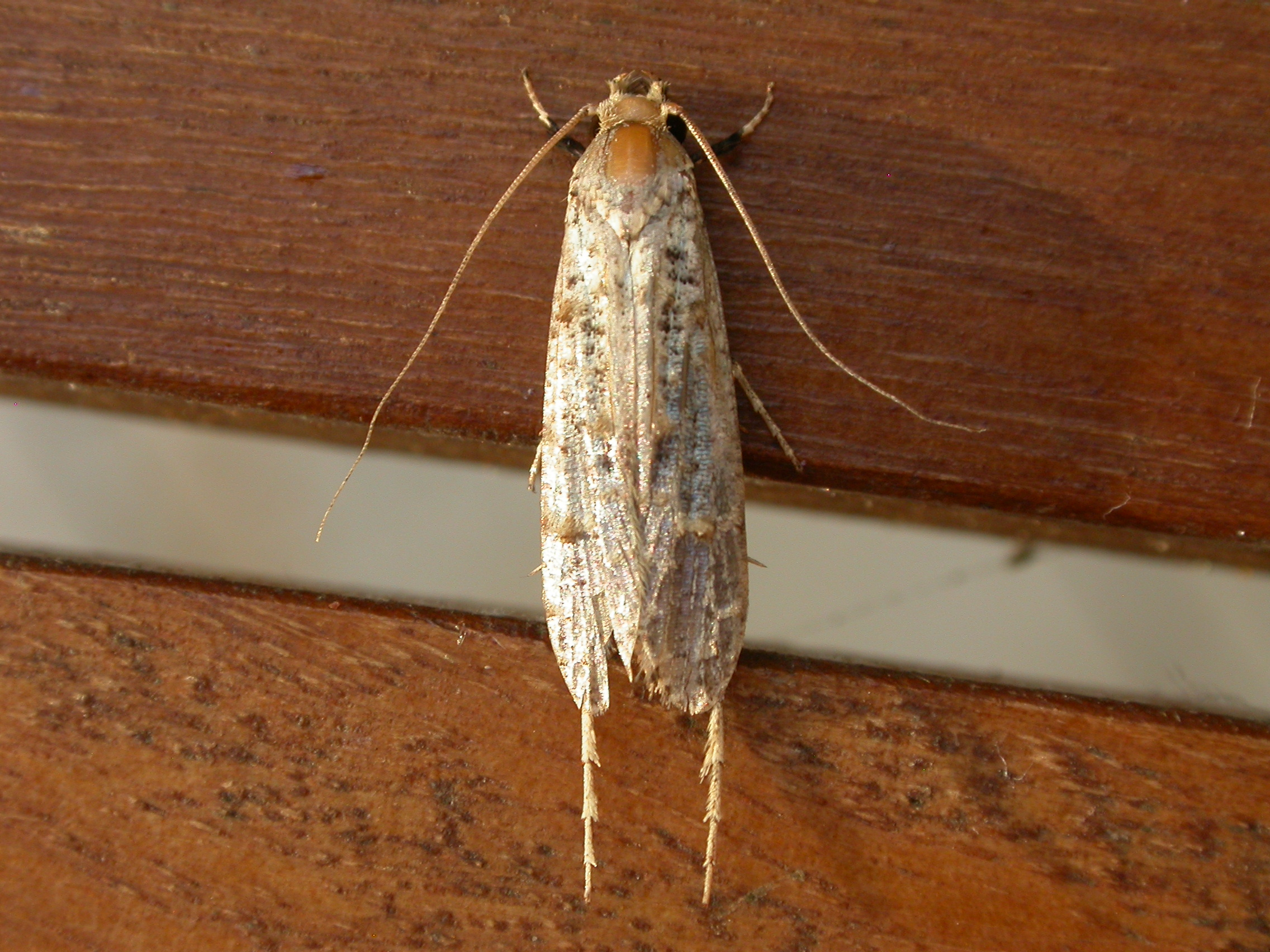
