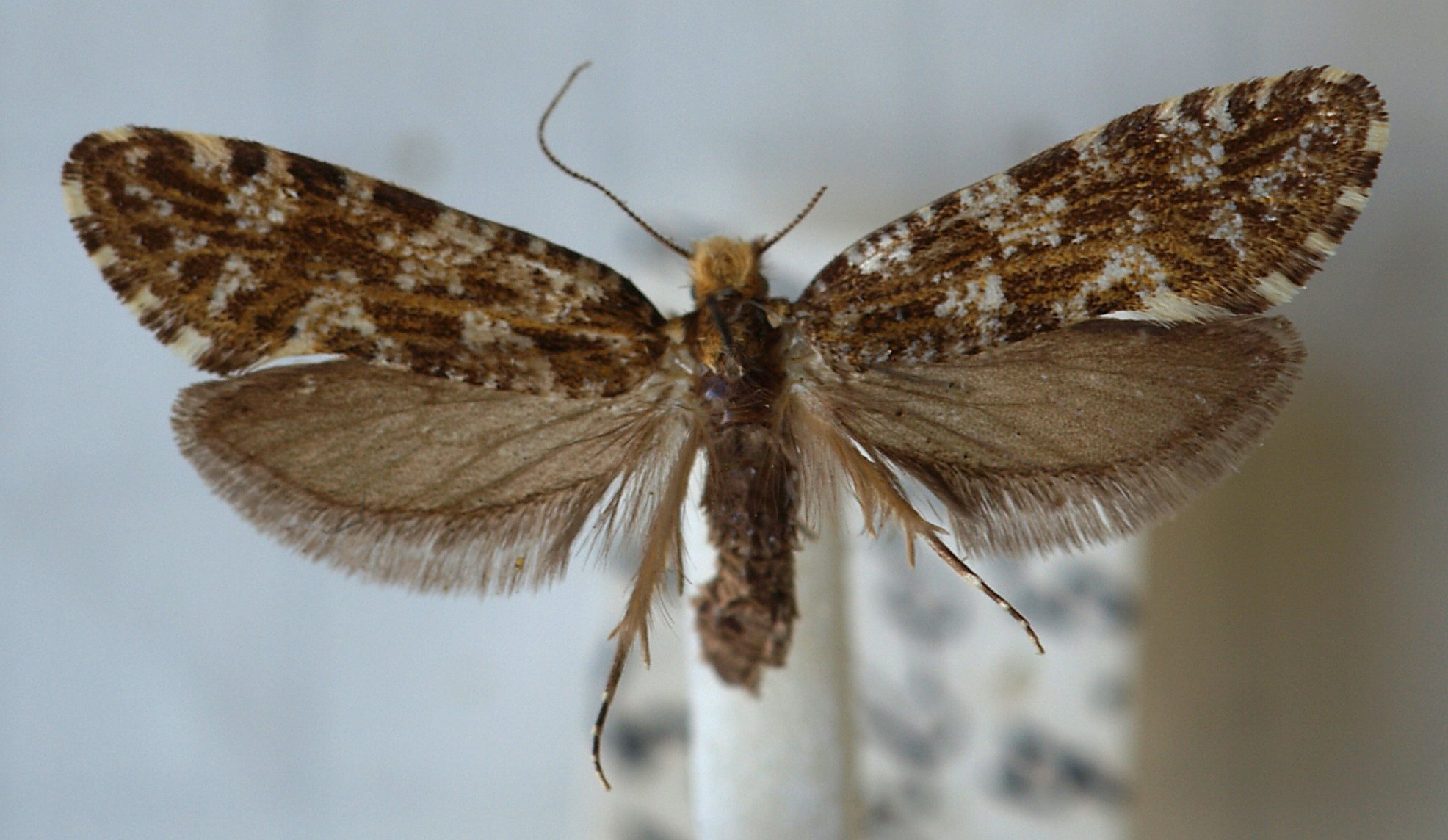
- Adult specimen of T. parasitella

Scientific classification
- Kingdom: Animalia
- Phylum: Arthropoda
- Clade: Pancrustacea
- Class: Insecta
- Order: Lepidoptera
- Family: Tineidae
- Subfamily: Nemapogoninae
- Genus: Triaxomera; Zagulajev, 1959

Type species
- Tinea fulvimitrella Sodoffsky, 1830

Species
- 7, see text

= Triaxomera =

Genus of moths

Triaxomera is a genus of the fungus moth family, Tineidae. Therein, it belongs to the subfamily Nemapogoninae.

Seven species presently placed in Triaxomera:

- Triaxomera baldensis G.Petersen, 1983
- Triaxomera caucasiella Zagulajev, 1959
- Triaxomera fulvimitrella (Sodoffsky 1830) (= T. bohemanella, T. kroesmanni)
- Triaxomera kurilensis (Zagulajev, 1996)
- Triaxomera marsica G.Petersen, 1984
- Triaxomera parasitella
- Triaxomera puncticulata Miyamoto, Hirowatari & Yamamoto, 2002
