= Triaxomasia =

Scientific classification
- Kingdom: Animalia
- Phylum: Arthropoda
- Clade: Pancrustacea
- Class: Insecta
- Order: Lepidoptera
- Family: Tineidae
- Subfamily: Nemapogoninae
- Genus: Triaxomasia; Zagulayev, 1964

Type species
- Triaxomasia caprimulgella Stainton, 1851

Genus of moths

Triaxomasia is a small genus of the fungus moth family, Tineidae. Therein, it belongs to the subfamily Nemapogoninae.

Only 2 species are presently placed here:

- Triaxomasia caprimulgella (Stainton, 1851)
- Triaxomasia orientanus (Ponomarenko & Park, 1996)
