= Cephimallota =

Scientific classification
- Kingdom: Animalia
- Phylum: Arthropoda
- Clade: Pancrustacea
- Class: Insecta
- Order: Lepidoptera
- Family: Tineidae
- Subfamily: Myrmecozelinae
- Genus: Cephimallota; Bruand, 1851

Type species
- Cephimallota crassiflavella Bruand, 1851

Synonyms
- Anemallota Zagulajev, 1965; Aphimallota Zagulajev, 1983; Cephitinea Zagulajev, 1964

Genus of moths

Cephimallota is a genus of moths belonging to the family Tineidae.

The species of this genus are found in the palearctic zone.

== Species ==
- Cephimallota praetoriella (Christoph, 1872)
- Cephimallota tunesiella (Zagulajev, 1966)
- Cephimallota crassiflavella Bruand, 1851
- Cephimallota angusticostella (Zeller, 1839)
- Cephimallota chasanica Zagulajev, 1965
