= Scalmatica insularis =

Scientific classification
- Kingdom: Animalia
- Phylum: Arthropoda
- Clade: Pancrustacea
- Class: Insecta
- Order: Lepidoptera
- Family: Tineidae
- Genus: Scalmatica
- Species: S. insularis

Binomial name
- Scalmatica insularis Gozmány, 1969

Species of moth

Scalmatica insularis is a moth of the family Tineidae. It was described by Hungarian entomologist László Anthony Gozmány in 1969 and is found in eastern Madagascar.

The wingspan of this species is 11 mm. Head, palpi, antennae, thorax and basic colour of the forewings is pure white, pattern three oblong or subtriangular spots from costa to middle of the wing in light golden-brown colour.
