= Timaea =

Scientific classification
- Kingdom: Animalia
- Phylum: Arthropoda
- Clade: Pancrustacea
- Class: Insecta
- Order: Lepidoptera
- Family: Tineidae
- Subfamily: Myrmecozelinae
- Genus: Timaea; Walker, 1863
- Species: T. bivittatella

Binomial name
- Timaea bivittatella Walker, 1863

Synonyms
- Timaea costella Walker, 1863; Manliana astrictella Walker, 1864

Genus of moths

Timaea is a genus of moths belonging to the family Tineidae.

There is presently only one species in this genus, Timaea bivittatella Walker, 1863 that is known from Australia.
