= Triaxomera puncticulata =

Scientific classification
- Kingdom: Animalia
- Phylum: Arthropoda
- Clade: Pancrustacea
- Class: Insecta
- Order: Lepidoptera
- Family: Tineidae
- Genus: Triaxomera
- Species: T. puncticulata

Binomial name
- Triaxomera puncticulata Miyamoto, Hirowatari & Yamamoto, 2002

Species of insect

Triaxomera puncticulata is a moth of the family Tineidae. It found in Japan (Honshu, Kyushu).

The wingspan is 10–14 mm for males and 14–16 mm for females. Adults are on wing from mid to late May.

The larvae possibly feed on decaying wood of Fagus crenata.
