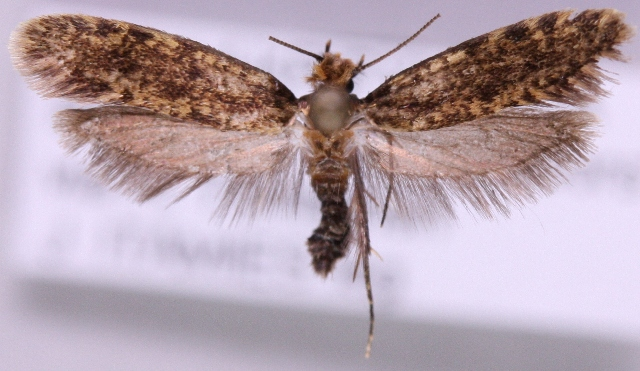

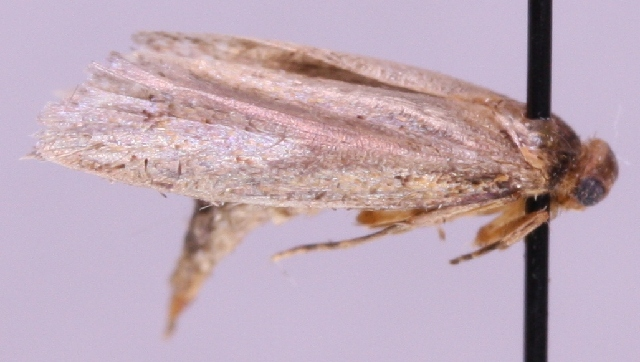

Scientific classification
- Domain: Eukaryota
- Kingdom: Animalia
- Phylum: Arthropoda
- Class: Insecta
- Order: Lepidoptera
- Family: Tineidae
- Genus: Haplotinea
- Species: H. ditella

Binomial name
- Haplotinea ditella (Pierce & Metcalfe, 1938)

Synonyms
- Tinea ditella Pierce & Metcalfe, 1938

= Haplotinea ditella =

Species of moth

Haplotinea ditella is a moth of the family Tineidae. It was described by Pierce & Metcalfe in 1938. It is found in most of Europe, except Ireland, France, Switzerland, the Iberian Peninsula and the western and southern part of the Balkan Peninsula.

The wingspan is 11–18 mm. Adults have been recorded on wing from May to September.

The larvae feed on stored vegetable products, grain, rice and groundnuts.
