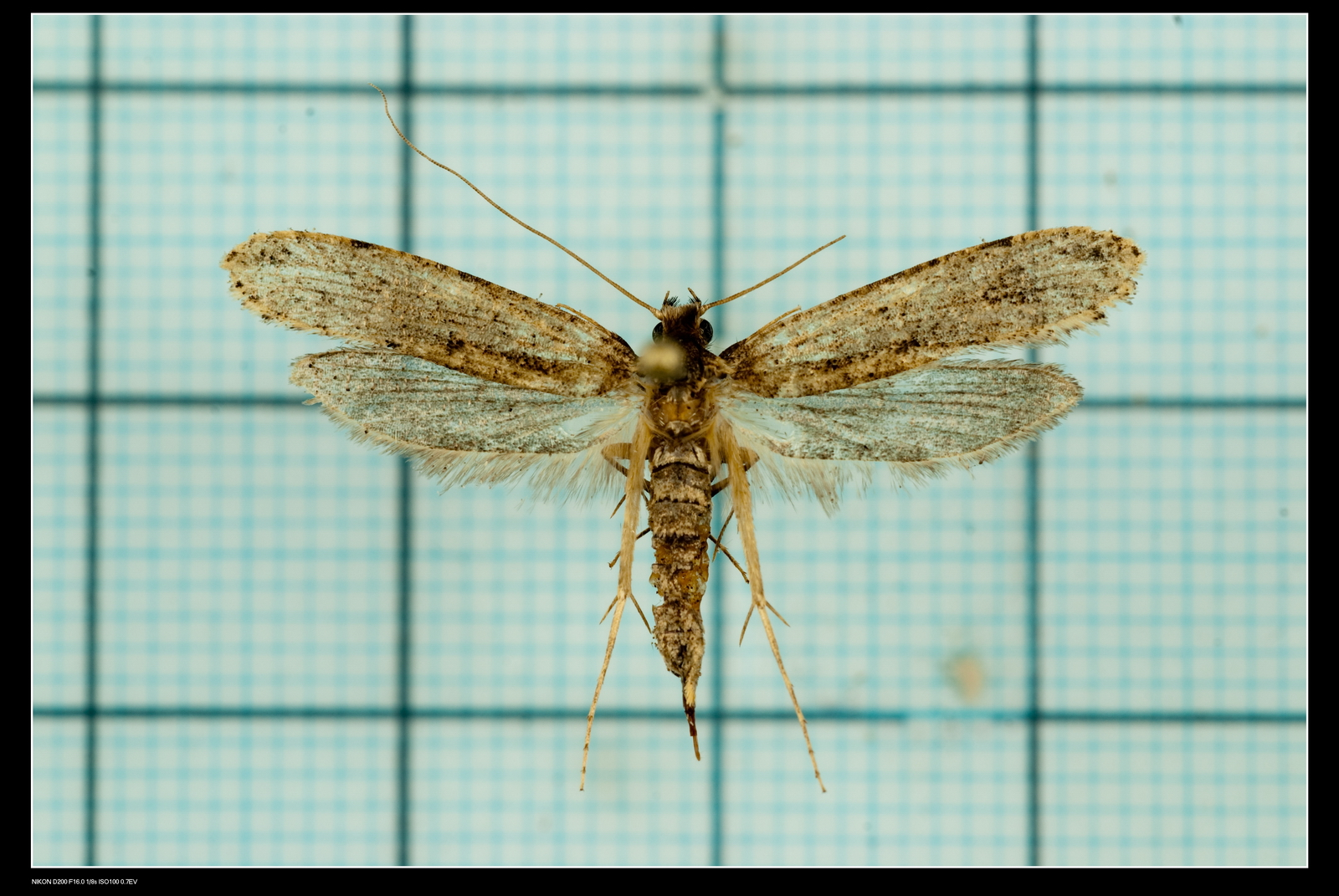

Scientific classification
- Kingdom: Animalia
- Phylum: Arthropoda
- Class: Insecta
- Order: Lepidoptera
- Family: Tineidae
- Genus: Gerontha
- Species: G. dracuncula

Binomial name
- Gerontha dracuncula Meyrick, 1928

Synonyms
- Gerontha siroii Moriuti, 1989

= Gerontha dracuncula =

Species of moth

Gerontha dracuncula is a species of moth of the family Tineidae. It is found in China (Yunnan), Taiwan and in Thailand.
