= Triaxomera marsica =

Scientific classification
- Kingdom: Animalia
- Phylum: Arthropoda
- Class: Insecta
- Order: Lepidoptera
- Family: Tineidae
- Genus: Triaxomera
- Species: T. marsica

Binomial name
- Triaxomera marsica G.Petersen, 1984

Species of moth

Triaxomera marsica is a moth of the family Tineidae. It found in Italy, where it has only been recorded from the Parco Nazionale d'Abruzzo, Lazio e Molise.
