= Triaxomera caucasiella =

Scientific classification
- Kingdom: Animalia
- Phylum: Arthropoda
- Class: Insecta
- Order: Lepidoptera
- Family: Tineidae
- Genus: Triaxomera
- Species: T. caucasiella

Binomial name
- Triaxomera caucasiella Zagulajev, 1959

Species of moth

Triaxomera caucasiella is a moth of the family Tineidae. It found in Russia (the Caucasus).
