= Drosica =

Scientific classification
- Kingdom: Animalia
- Phylum: Arthropoda
- Clade: Pancrustacea
- Class: Insecta
- Order: Lepidoptera
- Family: Tineidae
- Subfamily: Myrmecozelinae
- Genus: Drosica; Walker, 1863

Genus of moths

Drosica is a genus of moths belonging to the family Tineidae. It was described by Francis Walker in 1863.

== Species ==
- Drosica abjectella Walker, 1863
- Drosica memorialis Meyrick, 1921
