= Contralissa =

Scientific classification
- Kingdom: Animalia
- Phylum: Arthropoda
- Clade: Pancrustacea
- Class: Insecta
- Order: Lepidoptera
- Family: Tineidae
- Subfamily: Myrmecozelinae
- Genus: Contralissa; Gozmány & Vári, 1973
- Species: C. catagrapta

Binomial name
- Contralissa catagrapta (Meyrick, 1927)

Synonyms
- Tinea catagrapta Meyrick, 1927

Genus of moths

Contralissa is a genus of moths belonging to the family Tineidae. It contains only one species, Contralissa catagrapta, which is found in South Africa.
