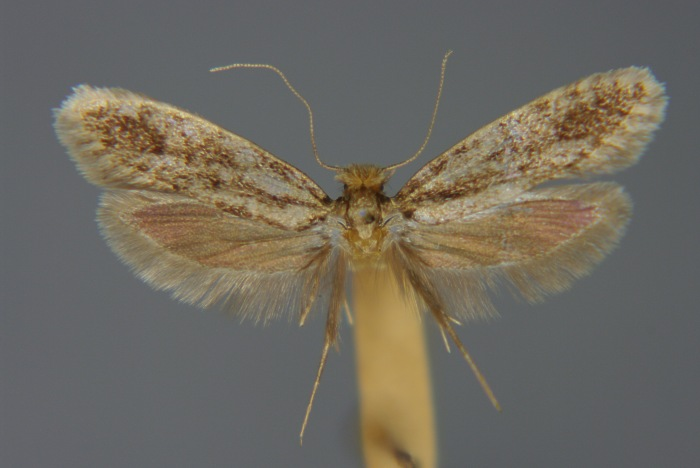

Scientific classification
- Kingdom: Animalia
- Phylum: Arthropoda
- Class: Insecta
- Order: Lepidoptera
- Family: Tineidae
- Genus: Haplotinea
- Species: H. insectella

Binomial name
- Haplotinea insectella (Fabricius, 1794)

Synonyms
- Tinea insectella Fabricius, 1794; Tinea fuscescentella Morris, 1870; Tinea misella Zeller, 1839

= Haplotinea insectella =

Species of moth

Haplotinea insectella, the drab clothes moth or fungus grain moth, is a moth of the family Tineidae. It was described by Johan Christian Fabricius in 1794. It is found in all of Europe, except Ireland, the Iberian Peninsula and the western and southern part of the Balkan Peninsula. It is also found in North America. The species is often found in warehouses, granaries, mills and farm buildings.

The wingspan is 11–20 mm. Adults are on wing from the end of May to the beginning of August, probably in one generation per year.
