= Criticonoma =

Scientific classification
- Kingdom: Animalia
- Phylum: Arthropoda
- Clade: Pancrustacea
- Class: Insecta
- Order: Lepidoptera
- Family: Tineidae
- Subfamily: Myrmecozelinae
- Genus: Criticonoma; Meyrick, 1910

Synonyms
- Etnodona Meyrick, 1915; Microsophista Meyrick, 1932

Genus of moths

Criticonoma is a genus of moths belonging to the family Tineidae.

== Species ==
- Criticonoma aspergata Gozmány & Vári, 1973
- Criticonoma calligrapta Gozmány, 2004
- Criticonoma chelonaea Meyrick, 1910
- Criticonoma crassa Gozmány & Vári, 1973
- Criticonoma doliopis (Meyrick, 1932)
- Criticonoma episcardina (Gozmány, 1965)
- Criticonoma esoterica (Gozmány, 1966)
- Criticonoma flaveata (Gozmány, 1968)
- Criticonoma gypsocoma (Meyrick, 1931)
- Criticonoma phalacropis (Meyrick, 1915)
