= Janseana =

Scientific classification
- Kingdom: Animalia
- Phylum: Arthropoda
- Clade: Pancrustacea
- Class: Insecta
- Order: Lepidoptera
- Family: Tineidae
- Subfamily: Myrmecozelinae
- Genus: Janseana; Gozmány L. A. & Vári L. 1973

Type species
- Phthoropoea vibrata Meyrick, 1913

Genus of moths

Janseana is a genus of moths belonging to the family Tineidae.

== Species ==
- Janseana sceptica (Meyrick, 1910)
- Janseana vibrata (Meyrick, 1913)
