= Ellochotis =

Scientific classification
- Kingdom: Animalia
- Phylum: Arthropoda
- Clade: Pancrustacea
- Class: Insecta
- Order: Lepidoptera
- Family: Tineidae
- Subfamily: Myrmecozelinae
- Genus: Ellochotis; Meyrick, 1920

Genus of moths

Ellochotis is a genus of moths belonging to the family Tineidae.

== Species ==
- Ellochotis caligata (Meyrick, 1913)
- Ellochotis ectocharis Gozmány, 1976
- Ellochotis exilis Gozmány & Vári, 1973
- Ellochotis fraudulenta (Meyrick, 1912)
- Ellochotis infausta Meyrick, 1920
- Ellochotis leontopa (Meyrick, 1908)
- Ellochotis lyncodes (Meyrick, 1921)
- Ellochotis opifica (Meyrick, 1908)
- Ellochotis picroxesta (Meyrick, 1926)
- Ellochotis purpurea (Stainton, 1860)
- Ellochotis territa (Meyrick, 1920)
- Ellochotis trophias (Meyrick, 1908)
- Ellochotis verecunda (Meyrick, 1912)
