= Dicanica =

Scientific classification
- Kingdom: Animalia
- Phylum: Arthropoda
- Clade: Pancrustacea
- Class: Insecta
- Order: Lepidoptera
- Family: Tineidae
- Subfamily: Myrmecozelinae
- Genus: Dicanica; Meyrick, 1913
- Species: D. acrocentra

Binomial name
- Dicanica acrocentra Meyrick, 1913

Genus of moths

Dicanica is a genus of moths belonging to the family Tineidae. It contains only one species, Dicanica acrocentra, which is found in South Africa.
