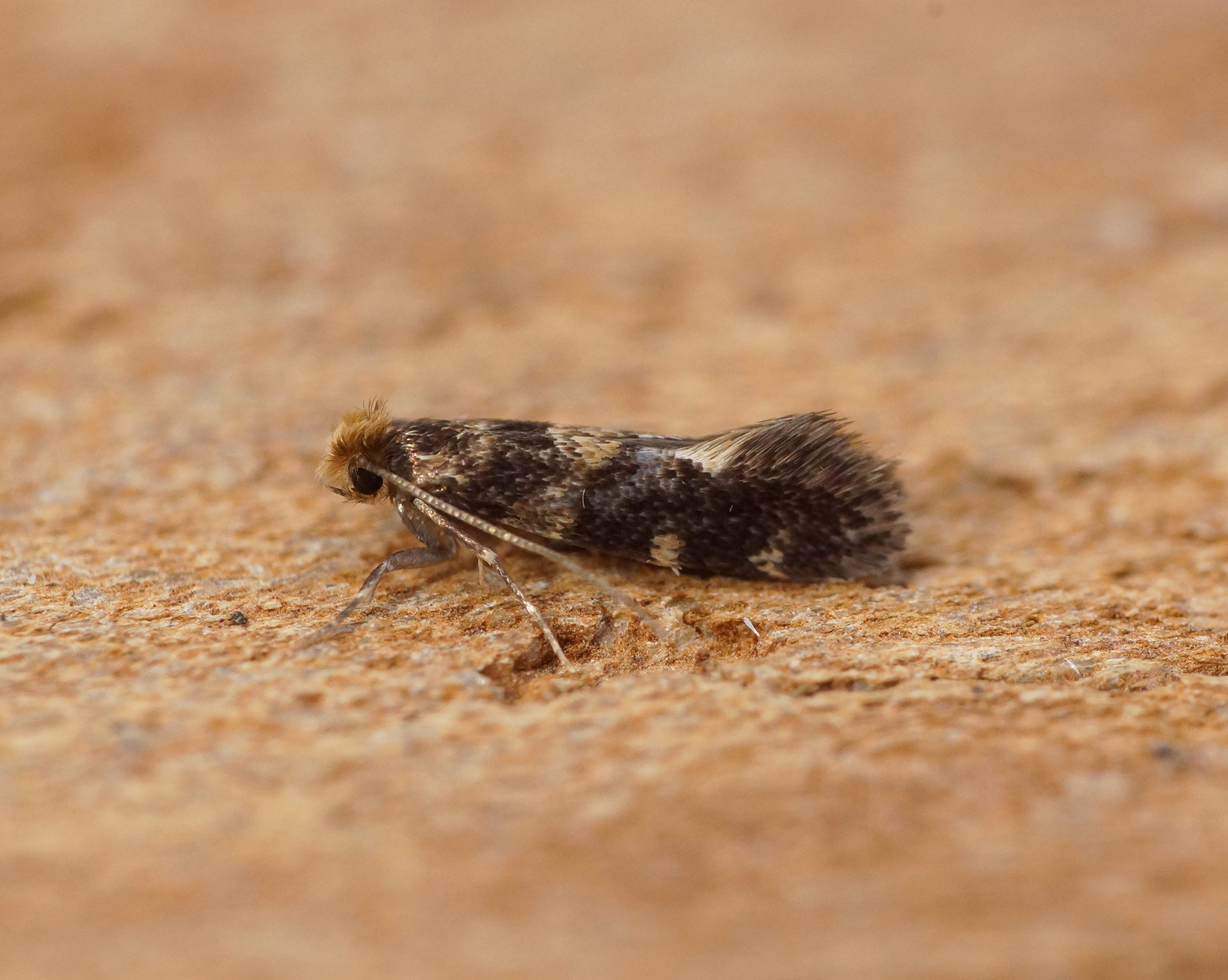

Scientific classification
- Kingdom: Animalia
- Phylum: Arthropoda
- Clade: Pancrustacea
- Class: Insecta
- Order: Lepidoptera
- Family: Tineidae
- Genus: Triaxomasia
- Species: T. caprimulgella

Binomial name
- Triaxomasia caprimulgella (Stainton, 1851)

Synonyms
- Tinea caprimulgella Stainton, 1851

= Triaxomasia caprimulgella =

Species of moth

Triaxomasia caprimulgella is a moth of the family Tineidae. It found in most of Europe, except Ireland, Luxembourg, Spain, Finland, the Baltic region, and the central part of the Balkan Peninsula.

The wingspan is 9–11 mm. The forewings are brown, with an indistinct yellowish fascia a little before the middle, a triangular yellowish spot on the inner margin towards the anal angle and three smaller yellowish spots on the costa. The hindwings are purplish.

The larvae possibly feed on rotting wood or possibly dead insects.
