= Machaeropteris =

Scientific classification
- Kingdom: Animalia
- Phylum: Arthropoda
- Clade: Pancrustacea
- Class: Insecta
- Order: Lepidoptera
- Family: Tineidae
- Subfamily: Myrmecozelinae
- Genus: Machaeropteris; Walsingham, 1887

Type species
- Tinea receptella Walker, 1863 sensu Walsingham

Genus of moths

Machaeropteris is a genus of moths belonging to the family Tineidae.

== Species ==
- Machaeropteris baloghi Gozmány, 1965
- Machaeropteris eribapta Meyrick, 1915 (from Mozambique)
- Machaeropteris encotopa Meyrick, 1922 (from India)
- Machaeropteris euthysana Meyrick, 1931
- Machaeropteris histurga Meyrick, 1915 (from Malawi)
- Machaeropteris irritabilis Meyrick, 1932
- Machaeropteris magnifica Gozmány, 1968
- Machaeropteris ochroptera Gozmány, 1967
- Machaeropteris petalacma Meyrick, 1932 (Taiwan)
- Machaeropteris phenax Meyrick, 1911 (from Sri Lanka)
- Machaeropteris plinthotripta (Meyrick, 1919)
- Machaeropteris synaphria Meyrick, 1922 (from India)
- Machaeropteris turbata Meyrick, 1922 (from India)
