= Endromarmata =

Scientific classification
- Kingdom: Animalia
- Phylum: Arthropoda
- Clade: Pancrustacea
- Class: Insecta
- Order: Lepidoptera
- Family: Tineidae
- Subfamily: Myrmecozelinae
- Genus: Endromarmata; Gozmány & Vári, 1973
- Species: E. lutipalpis

Binomial name
- Endromarmata lutipalpis (Meyrick, 1922)

Synonyms
- Myrmecozela lutipalpis Meyrick, 1922

Genus of moths

Endromarmata are a genus of moths, belonging to the family Tineidae. It contains only one species, Endromarmata lutipalpis, which is found in Mali and Senegal.
