= Triaxomera kurilensis =

Scientific classification
- Kingdom: Animalia
- Phylum: Arthropoda
- Class: Insecta
- Order: Lepidoptera
- Family: Tineidae
- Genus: Triaxomera
- Species: T. kurilensis

Binomial name
- Triaxomera kurilensis Zagulajev, 1996

Species of moth

Triaxomera kurilensis is a moth of the family Tineidae. It found on the Kurile Islands.
