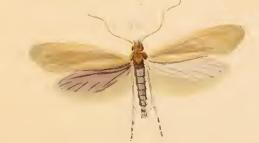
- Myrmecozela ochraceella

Scientific classification
- Kingdom: Animalia
- Phylum: Arthropoda
- Clade: Pancrustacea
- Class: Insecta
- Order: Lepidoptera
- Family: Tineidae
- Subfamily: Myrmecozelinae
- Genus: Myrmecozela; Zeller, 1852

Synonyms
- Dulcana Zagulajev, 1975; Flavida Zagulajev, 1975; Proctolopha Rebel, 1915; Promasia Chretien, 1905; Psephologa Meyrick, 1921

= Myrmecozela =

Genus of moths

Myrmecozela is a genus of moths belonging to the family Tineidae erected by Philipp Christoph Zeller.

== Species ==
- Myrmecozela armeniaca Zagulajev, 1971
- Myrmecozela asariella Zagulajev, 1972
- Myrmecozela ataxella (Chrétien, 1905) (=Myrmecozela chneourella (Lucas, 1950))
- Myrmecozela carabachica Zagulajev, 1968
- Myrmecozela caustocoma Meyrick, 1928
- Myrmecozela changaicus Zagulajev, 1997
- Myrmecozela climacodes (Meyrick, 1925)
- Myrmecozela corymbota Meyrick, 1919
- Myrmecozela cuencella (Caradja, 1920)
- Myrmecozela curtella Tengström, 1869
- Myrmecozela deserticola Walsingham, 1907
- Myrmecozela diacona Walsingham, 1907
- Myrmecozela dzhungarica Zagulajev, 1971
- Myrmecozela erecta Braun, 1923
- Myrmecozela gajndzhiella Zagulajev, 1968
- Myrmecozela heptapotamica Zagulajev, 1971
- Myrmecozela hispanella Zagulajev, 1971
- Myrmecozela hyrcanella Zagulajev, 1968
- Myrmecozela imeretica Zagulajev, 1972
- Myrmecozela isopsamma Meyrick, 1920 (=Myrmecozela ethiopica Gozmány, 1960, Myrmecozela pelochlora (Meyrick, 1920), Myrmecozela philoptica Meyrick, 1920)
- Myrmecozela kasachstanica Zagulajev, 1972
- Myrmecozela lambesella Rebel, 1901 (=Myrmecozela cuencella (Petersen, 1957))
- Myrmecozela lutosella (Eversmann, 1844) (= Myrmecozela stichograpta (Meyrick, 1936), Myrmecozela centrogramma (Meyrick, 1921), Myrmecozela gigantea (Christoph, 1873), Myrmecozela insignis (Amsel, 1935))
- Myrmecozela mongolica Petersen, 1965
- Myrmecozela ochraceella (Tengström, 1848)
- Myrmecozela ordubasis Zagulajev, 1968
- Myrmecozela parnassiella Rebel, 1915
- Myrmecozela paurosperma Meyrick, 1926
- Myrmecozela pogonopis Meyrick, 1926
- Myrmecozela pontica Zagulajev, 1971
- Myrmecozela rjabovi Zagulajev, 1968
- Myrmecozela samurensis Zagulajev, 1997
- Myrmecozela saule Zagulajev, 1972
- Myrmecozela stepicola Zagulajev, 1972
- Myrmecozela taurella Zagulajev, 1971
