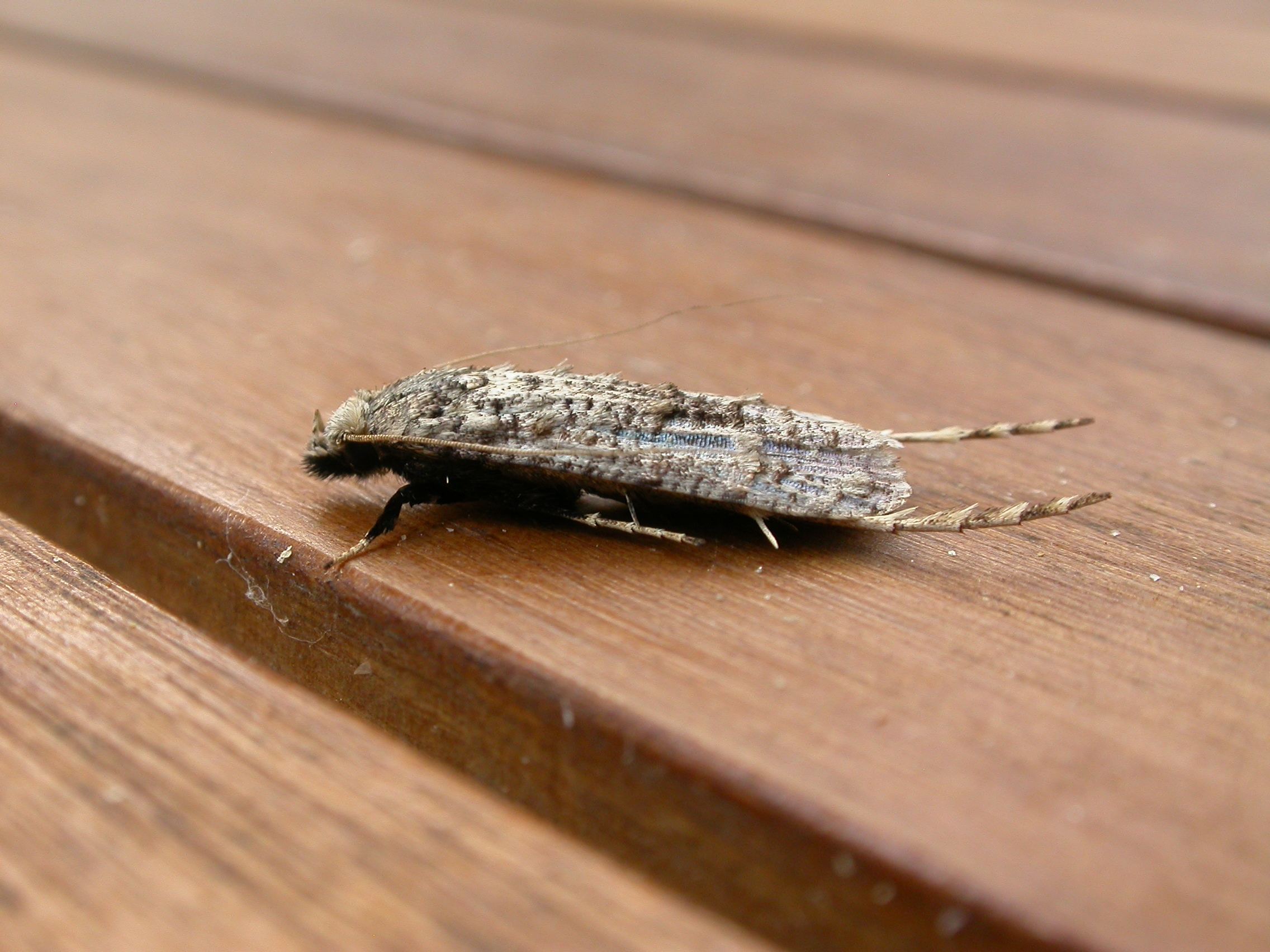
- Gerontha acrosthenia, Mission Beach, QLD, 20 December 2011

Scientific classification
- Kingdom: Animalia
- Phylum: Arthropoda
- Clade: Pancrustacea
- Class: Insecta
- Order: Lepidoptera
- Family: Tineidae
- Subfamily: Myrmecozelinae
- Genus: Gerontha; Walker, 1864

Type species
- Gerontha captiosella Walker, 1864

= Gerontha =

Genus of moths

Gerontha is a genus of moths belonging to the family Tineidae.

Larvae of Gerontha have been reported boring in the dead wood of Shorea robusta A. DC., Dipterocarpaceae (Fletcher, 1933).

== Species ==
- Gerontha acrosthenia Zagulajev, 1972
- Gerontha akahatii Moriuti, 1989
- Gerontha albidicomans Moriuti, 1989
- Gerontha ampliptera Ponomarenko & Park, 1996
- Gerontha borea Moriuti, 1977
- Gerontha capna Diakonoff, 1968
- Gerontha captiosella Walker, 1864 (from Sri Lanka)
- Gerontha diascopa Diakonoff, 1968
- Gerontha dolichophallica Moriuti, 1989
- Gerontha dracuncula Meyrick, 1928 (= Gerontha siroii Moriuti, 1989)
- Gerontha flexura G.H. Huang, Hirowatari & M. Wang, 2006
- Gerontha hoenei Petersen, 1987
- Gerontha hyalina Moriuti, 1989
- Gerontha melanopalpalis Moriuti, 1989
- Gerontha monostigma Diakonoff, 1968
- Gerontha namhaensis Ponomarenko & Park, 1996
- Gerontha navapuriensis Moriuti, 1989
- Gerontha nivicaput Diakonoff, 1968
- Gerontha opaca Moriuti, 1989
- Gerontha rostriformis H.H. Li & Y.L. Xiao, 2009
- Gerontha rugulosa H.H. Li & Y.L. Xiao, 2009
- Gerontha siamensis Moriuti, 1989
- Gerontha similihoenei H.H. Li & Y.L. Xiao, 2009
- Gerontha stheacra Zagulajev, 1972
- Gerontha sumihiroi Moriuti, 1989
- Gerontha thailandiae Moriuti, 1989
- Gerontha trapezia H.H. Li & Y.L. Xiao, 2009
- Gerontha tudai Moriuti, 1989
