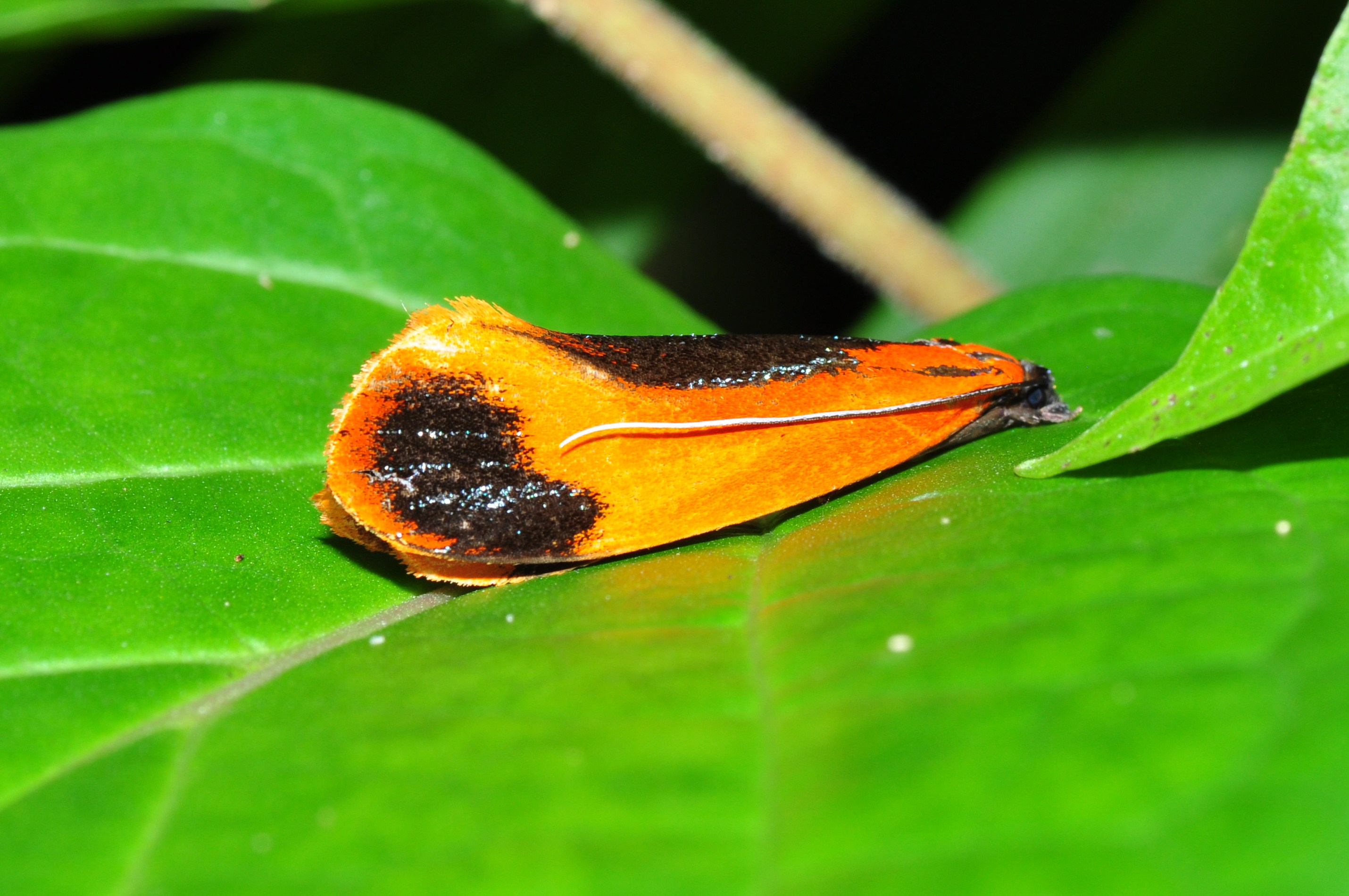
- Coryptilum klugii (cf)

Scientific classification
- Kingdom: Animalia
- Phylum: Arthropoda
- Clade: Pancrustacea
- Class: Insecta
- Order: Lepidoptera
- Family: Tineidae
- Subfamily: Myrmecozelinae
- Genus: Coryptilum; Zeller, 1839

Synonyms
- Sagora Walker, 1869; Sippharara Walker, 1866

= Coryptilum =

Genus of moths

Coryptilum is a genus of moths belonging to the family Tineidae. It was described by Philipp Christoph Zeller in 1839.

The species of this genus are dayflying moths of brilliant coloration. They are found from India to the Solomon Islands.

== Species ==
- Coryptilum klugii Zeller (from Malaysia)
- Coryptilum luteum Diakonoff, 1968
- Coryptilum rutilella (Walker, 1869)
- Coryptilum woodfordi
