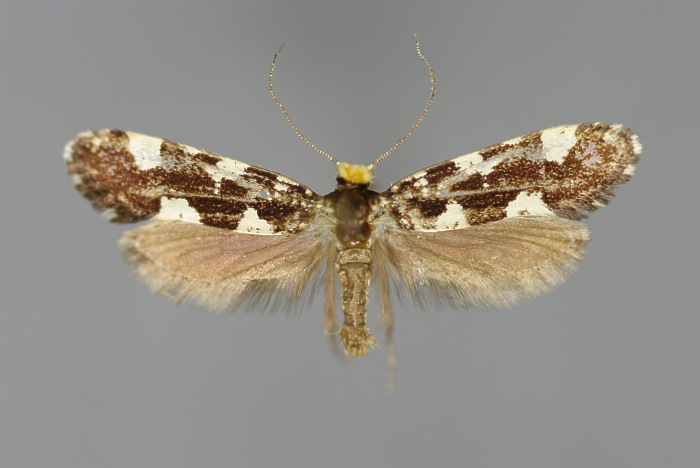

Scientific classification
- Kingdom: Animalia
- Phylum: Arthropoda
- Clade: Pancrustacea
- Class: Insecta
- Order: Lepidoptera
- Family: Tineidae
- Genus: Triaxomera
- Species: T. fulvimitrella

Binomial name
- Triaxomera fulvimitrella (Sodoffsky, 1830)

Synonyms
- Tinea fulvimitrella Sodoffsky, 1830; Adela bohemanella Zetterstedt, 1840; Tinea kroesmanni Stainton, 1855

= Triaxomera fulvimitrella =

Species of moth

Triaxomera fulvimitrella, the four-spotted clothes moth, is a moth of the family Tineidae. It is found in most of Europe, except Ireland, the Iberian Peninsula, Italy, Slovenia and most of the Balkan Peninsula. The habitat consists of woodlands.

The wingspan is 15–22 mm. Adults are on wing from May to July.

The larvae feed in dead wood or on bracket fungi (including Inonotus radiatus and Piptoporus betulinus), especially those growing on Fagus and Quercus species. Larvae can be found from September onwards during the winter months.
