= Triaxomera baldensis =

Scientific classification
- Kingdom: Animalia
- Phylum: Arthropoda
- Class: Insecta
- Order: Lepidoptera
- Family: Tineidae
- Genus: Triaxomera
- Species: T. baldensis

Binomial name
- Triaxomera baldensis G. Petersen, 1983

Species of moth

Triaxomera baldensis is a moth of the family Tineidae. It only known from Italy.

The wingspan is about 19 mm.
