= Scalmatica =

Scientific classification
- Kingdom: Animalia
- Phylum: Arthropoda
- Clade: Pancrustacea
- Class: Insecta
- Order: Lepidoptera
- Family: Tineidae
- Subfamily: Myrmecozelinae
- Genus: Scalmatica; Meyrick, 1911

Type species
- Scalmatica rimosa Meyrick, 1911

Synonyms
- Epicnaptis Meyrick, 1916; Latypica Meyrick, 1916

Genus of moths

Scalmatica is a genus of moths belonging to the family Tineidae.

== Biology ==
One species of this genus Scalmatica albofasciella Stainton 1859 had been found boring aerial roots of Ficus benghalensis in India and *Scalmatica corticea Meyrick, 1925 had been reported from Vitis sp..

== Species ==
Some species of this genus are:

- Scalmatica albifusa Meyrick, 1926
- Scalmatica albofasciella (Stainton 1859) (from India)
- Scalmatica ascendens Gozmány, 1966
- Scalmatica constrata Meyrick, 1919 (from Sri Lanka)
- Scalmatica corticea (Meyrick, 1925) (from Egypt)
- Scalmatica gnathosella Mey, 2011
- Scalmatica insularis Gozmány, 1969
- Scalmatica malacista Meyrick, 1924
- Scalmatica myelodes Meyrick, 1921
- Scalmatica phaulocentra Meyrick, 1921
- Scalmatica retiaria Meyrick, 1919
- Scalmatica rhicnopa Meyrick, 1919
- Scalmatica rigens Meyrick, 1916
- Scalmatica rimosa Meyrick, 1911
- Scalmatica rimosa Meyrick, 1911 (from Seychelles)
- Scalmatica saccusella Mey, 2011
- Scalmatica separata Gozmány, 1965
- Scalmatica zernyi Gozmány, 1967
