= Metapherna =

Scientific classification
- Kingdom: Animalia
- Phylum: Arthropoda
- Clade: Pancrustacea
- Class: Insecta
- Order: Lepidoptera
- Family: Tineidae
- Genus: Metapherna; G.S. Robinson & Nielsen, 1993

Genus of moths

Metapherna is a genus of moths belonging to the family Tineidae.

== Species ==
This genus includes the Australian species:

- Metapherna amaurodes (Meyrick, 1893)
- Metapherna castella (Walker, 1863)
- Metapherna isomacra (Meyrick, 1893)
- Metapherna salsa (Meyrick, 1920)
