= Dinica (moth) =

Scientific classification
- Kingdom: Animalia
- Phylum: Arthropoda
- Clade: Pancrustacea
- Class: Insecta
- Order: Lepidoptera
- Family: Tineidae
- Subfamily: Nemapogoninae
- Genus: Dinica; Gozmány, 1965

Type species
- Dinica hyacinthopa Meyrick, 1932

Genus of moths

Dinica is a genus of moths belonging to the family Tineidae.

== Species ==
Listed in alphabetical order:

- Dinica aspirans Meyrick, 1920 - found from Kenya
- Dinica diana Gozmány, 1966 - Uganda
- Dinica dierli Petersen, 1983 - Nepal
- Dinica endochrysa Meyrick, 1935 - Japan
- Dinica hyacinthopa Meyrick, 1932 - Uganda
- Dinica orphnospila Meyrick, 1934 - Uganda
- Dinica rhombata Huang, Wang & Hirowatari, 2006 - China (Guangdong, Hunan, Zhejiang)
- Dinica rotunda Li & Xiao, 2007 - China (Tibet)
- Dinica ruiliensis Li & Xiao, 2007 - China (Yunnan), Thailand
- Dinica sulciformis Li & Xiao, 2007 - China (Guizhou, Sichuan)
- Dinica uncata Li & Xiao, 2007 - China (Gansu)
- Dinica vulcanica Gozmány, 2004 - Namibia
