= Ischnuridia =

Scientific classification
- Kingdom: Animalia
- Phylum: Arthropoda
- Clade: Pancrustacea
- Class: Insecta
- Order: Lepidoptera
- Family: Tineidae
- Genus: Ischnuridia

Genus of moths

Ischnuridia is a genus of moths belonging to the family Tineidae.
