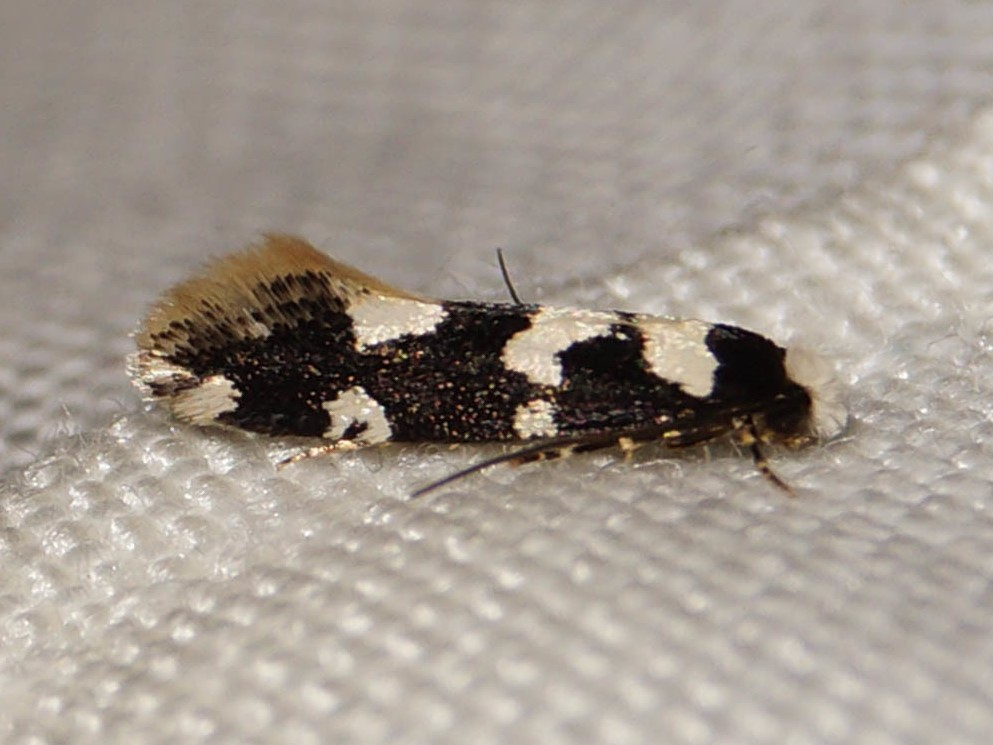
- Neurothaumasia ankerella

Scientific classification
- Kingdom: Animalia
- Phylum: Arthropoda
- Clade: Pancrustacea
- Class: Insecta
- Order: Lepidoptera
- Family: Tineidae
- Genus: Neurothaumasia; Marchand, 1934

Type species
- Neurothaumasia burdigalensis Le Marchand, 1934 = syn. of: Neurothaumasia ankerella (Mann, 1867)

= Neurothaumasia =

Genus of moths

Neurothaumasia is a genus of moths belonging to the family Tineidae.

== Species ==
- Neurothaumasia ankerella (Mann, 1867) (palearctic)
- Neurothaumasia betancuriacola Gaedike & Falck, 2019
- Neurothaumasia cretica (from Greece)
- Neurothaumasia fasciata Petersen, 1959 (middle East)
- Neurothaumasia inornata Petersen, 1966 (from Iran)
- Neurothaumasia macedonica Petersen, 1962
- Neurothaumasia maculata
- Neurothaumasia ragusaella (Wocke, 1889)
- Neurothaumasia tenuipennella Gaedike, 2011 (from Europe)
- Neurothaumasia tunesiella (from Tunisia)
