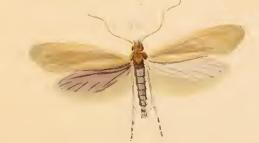

Scientific classification
- Kingdom: Animalia
- Phylum: Arthropoda
- Class: Insecta
- Order: Lepidoptera
- Family: Tineidae
- Genus: Myrmecozela
- Species: M. ochraceella

Binomial name
- Myrmecozela ochraceella (Tengström, 1848)

Synonyms
- Tinea ochraceella Tengström, 1848; Tinea perochraceella Doubleday, 1859; Myrmecozela extinctella Caradja, 1920

= Myrmecozela ochraceella =

Species of moth

Myrmecozela ochraceella is a moth of the family Tineidae. It is found in Great Britain, Fennoscandia, Russia, Estonia, Poland, Hungary, Romania, Austria, Switzerland, Italy, France and Spain.

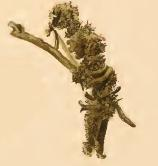
A larval run formed from bits of stick in the ants' nest spun together with silk

Larva

The wingspan is 15–18 mm. The larvae feed on detritus in ant nests (Formica aquilonia, Formica lugubris and Formica rufa) .
