= Pachyarthra =

Scientific classification
- Kingdom: Animalia
- Phylum: Arthropoda
- Clade: Pancrustacea
- Class: Insecta
- Order: Lepidoptera
- Family: Tineidae
- Genus: Pachyarthra; Amsel 1940

Genus of moths

Pachyarthra is a genus of moths belonging to the family Tineidae.

== Species ==
- Pachyarthra asiatica Petersen, 1959
- Pachyarthra brandti Petersen, 1966
- Pachyarthra grisea Petersen & Gaedike, 1982
- Pachyarthra iranica Petersen & Gaedike, 1984
- Pachyarthra lividella (Chrétien, 1915)
- Pachyarthra mediterraneae (Bethune-Baker, 1894) (=Pachyarthra pallidella (Lucas, 1933), Pachyarthra serotinella (Chrétien, 1915), Pachyarthra variegata (Bethune-Baker, 1894))
- Pachyarthra ochroplicella (Chrétien, 1915) (=Pachyarthra intermedia (Turati, 1930), Pachyarthra pentatma (Meyrick, 1936))
