= Vanna (moth) =

Scientific classification
- Kingdom: Animalia
- Phylum: Arthropoda
- Clade: Pancrustacea
- Class: Insecta
- Order: Lepidoptera
- Family: Tineidae
- Genus: Vanna; Robinson & Nielsen, 1993

Genus of moths

Vanna is a genus of moths belonging to the family Tineidae.

Only one species is known to have been described in this genus:

- Vanna bisepta (Meyrick, 1893).
