= Emmochlista =

Scientific classification
- Kingdom: Animalia
- Phylum: Arthropoda
- Clade: Pancrustacea
- Class: Insecta
- Order: Lepidoptera
- Family: Tineidae
- Genus: Emmochlista

Genus of moths

Emmochlista is a genus of moths belonging to the family Tineidae.

Only one species is known to have been described in this genus:

- Emmochlista claviformis Meyrick, 1931.
