= Analytarcha =

Scientific classification
- Kingdom: Animalia
- Phylum: Arthropoda
- Clade: Pancrustacea
- Class: Insecta
- Order: Lepidoptera
- Family: Tineidae
- Genus: Analytarcha; Meyrick, 1921

Genus of moths

Analytarcha is a genus of moths belonging to the family Tineidae.

The species of this include the Australian species:

- Analytarcha colleta (Meyrick, 1893)
- Analytarcha cyathodes Meyrick, 1921
- Analytarcha ochroxantha (Turner, 1900)
- Analytarcha trissoleuca (Turner, 1926)
