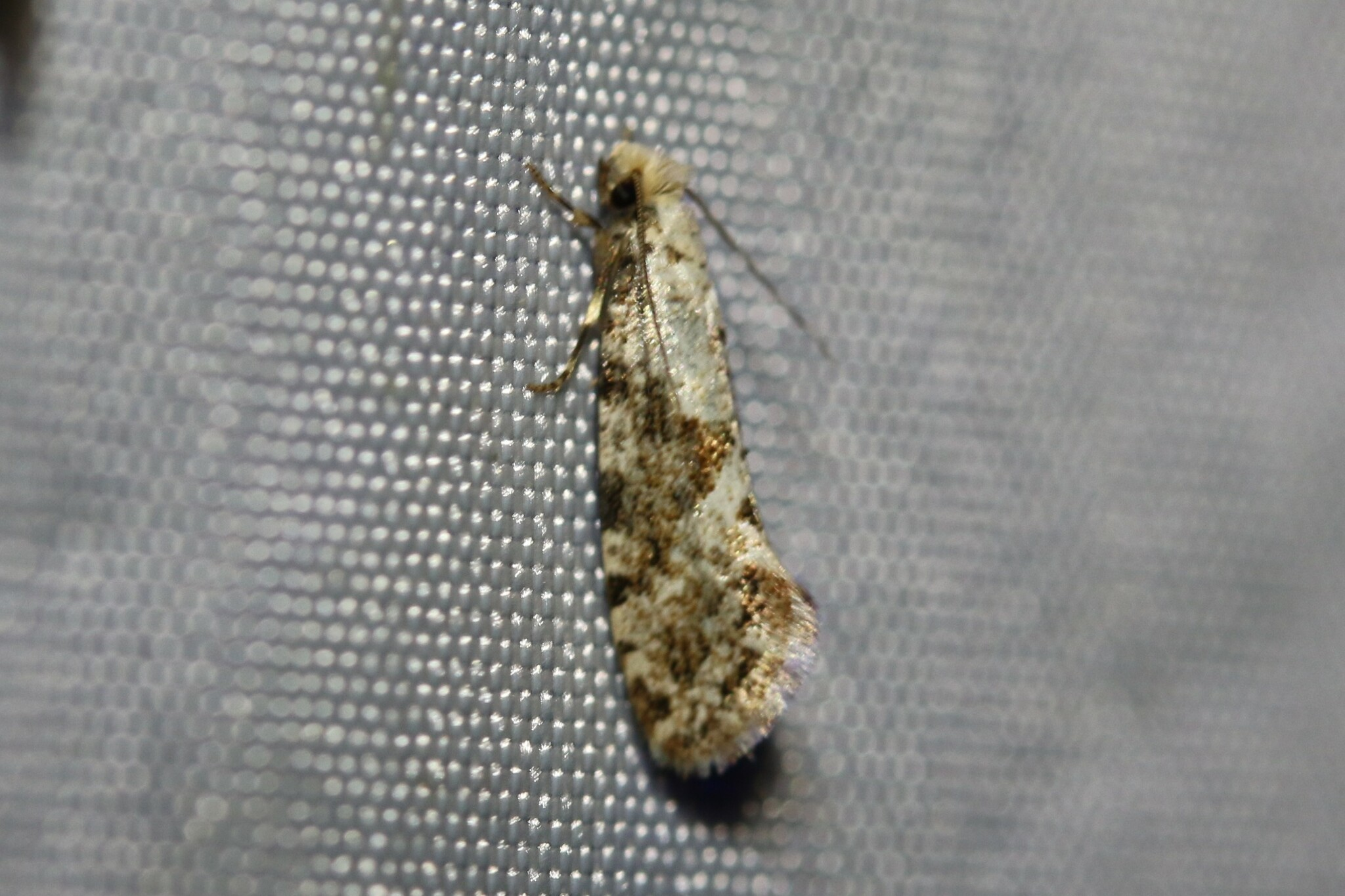
- Nemaxera betulinella, Switzerland

Scientific classification
- Kingdom: Animalia
- Phylum: Arthropoda
- Clade: Pancrustacea
- Class: Insecta
- Order: Lepidoptera
- Clade: Ditrysia
- Superfamily: Tineoidea
- Family: Tineidae
- Genus: Nemaxera; Zagulajev, 1964
- Species: N. betulinella

Binomial name
- Nemaxera betulinella (Paykull, 1785)

= Nemaxera =

Genus of moths

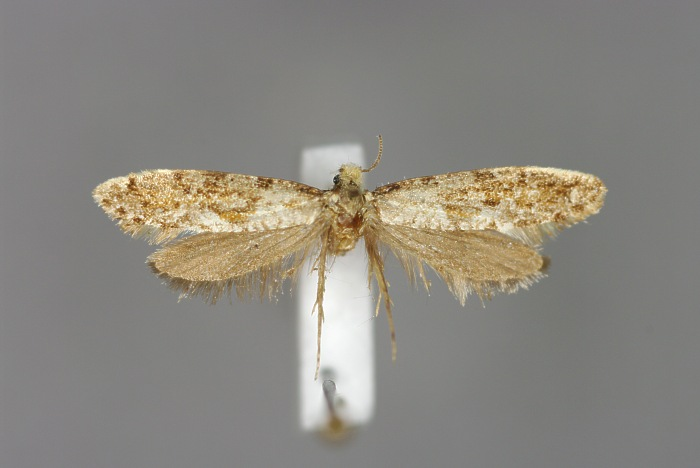
Nemaxera betulinella

Nemaxera is a genus of the fungus moth family, Tineidae. Therein, it belongs to the subfamily Nemapogoninae. The genus is considered monotypic, with the single species Nemaxera betulinella placed here.

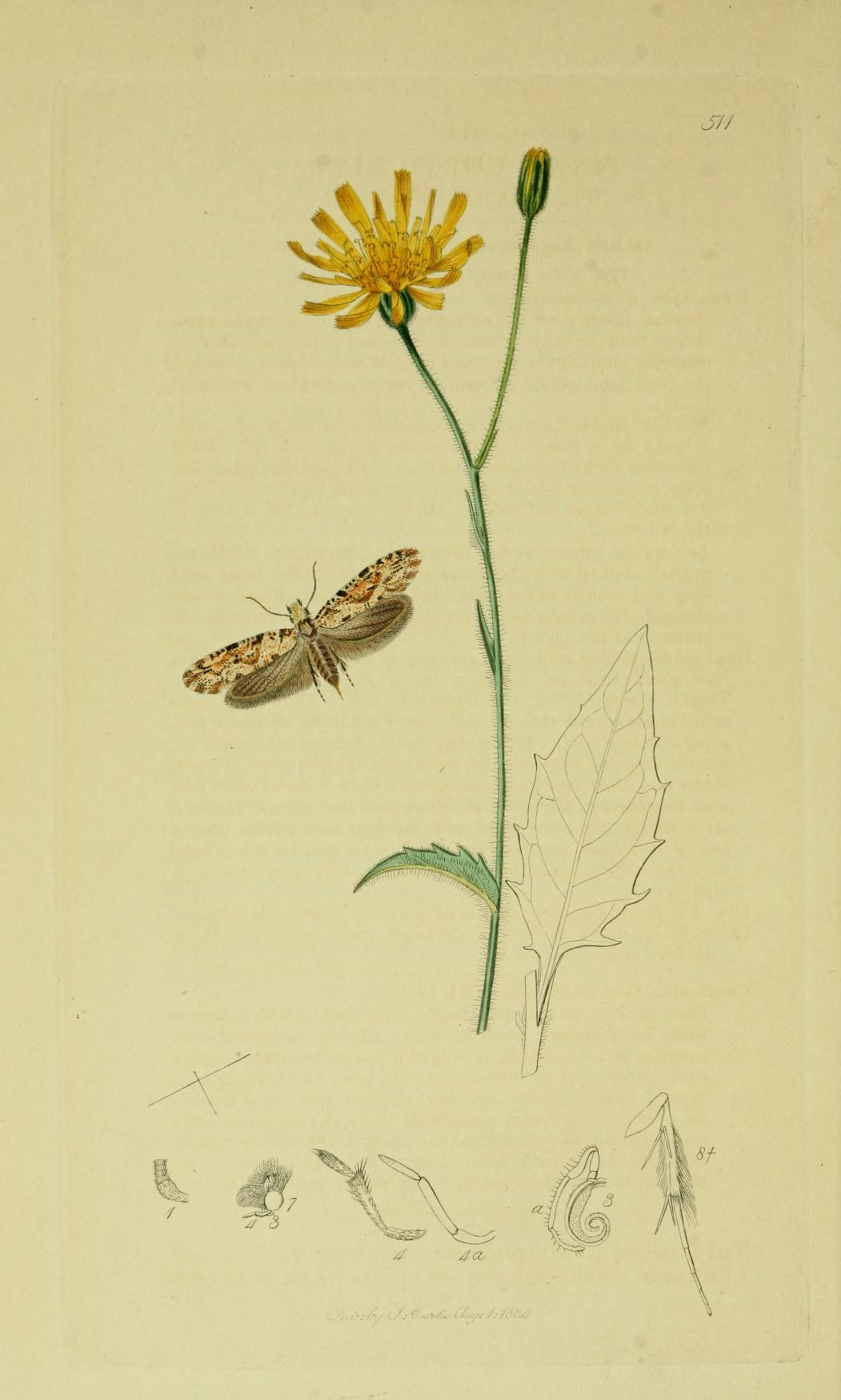
Illustration from John Curtis's British Entomology Volume 6

The species occurs in western Eurasia east of France; it is also found in Great Britain but appears to be absent from the Balkans. Its caterpillars feed mainly on fungi, namely birch polypore (Fomitopsis betulina) and turkey tail (Trametes versicolor). To a lesser extent, they eat rotting wood.

Junior synonyms of N. betulinella are:

- Nemaxera emortuella (Zeller, 1839)
- Tinea betulinella Paykull, 1785
- Tinea concinnella Hübner, [1836]
- Tinea corticella Curtis, 1834 (non Linnaeus, 1758: preoccupied)
- Tinea emortuella Zeller, 1839 – type of genus Nemaxera
