= Phthoropoea =

Scientific classification
- Kingdom: Animalia
- Phylum: Arthropoda
- Clade: Pancrustacea
- Class: Insecta
- Order: Lepidoptera
- Family: Tineidae
- Genus: Phthoropoea; Walsingham, 1896

Type species
- Phthoropoea carpella Walsingham, 1896

Genus of moths

Phthoropoea is a genus of moths belonging to the family Tineidae.

== Species ==
- Phthoropoea chalcomochla Agassiz, 2011 (from Kenya and Tanzania)
- Phthoropoea carpella Walsingham, 1896 (from Yemen)
