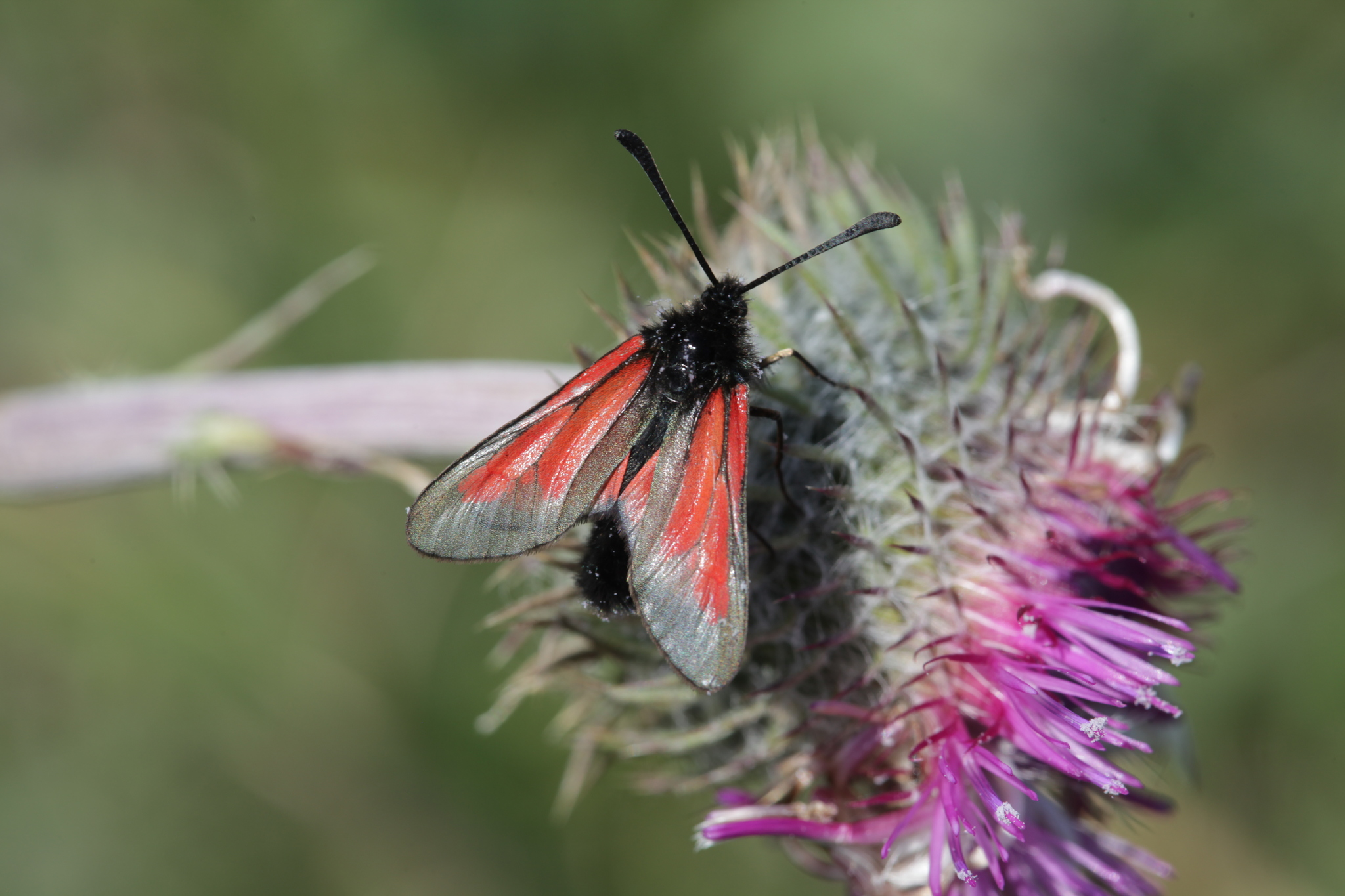

Scientific classification
- Kingdom: Animalia
- Phylum: Arthropoda
- Clade: Pancrustacea
- Class: Insecta
- Order: Lepidoptera
- Family: Zygaenidae
- Genus: Zygaena
- Species: Z. brizae

Binomial name
- Zygaena brizae (Esper, 1800)

Synonyms
- Sphinx brizae Esper, 1800; Zygaena brizae v. corycia Staudinger, 1878; Zygaena adanensis Reiss, 1929; Zygaena bernhaueri G. & H. Reiss, 1972; Zygaena araratensis Reiss, 1935; Zygaena araratensis adscharica Reiss, 1935; Zygaena ziganacola G. & H. Reiss, 1973

= Zygaena brizae =

Species of moth

Zygaena brizae is a species of moth in the Zygaenidae family. It is found in France, Italy, Austria, the Czech Republic, Poland, Slovakia, Hungary, the Balkan Peninsula, Moldova, Ukraine, Russia, Turkey and Georgia.

== Technical description and variation (Seitz) ==
Z. brizae Esp. (= scabiosae Hbn.) Smaller and weaker than the previous species,[ Zygaena purpuralis ] with considerably shorter antenna. The red wedge-spots are confluent, the basal two-thirds of forewing, apart from hindmargin, being all red, the distal edge of this area being straight and parallel to the edge of the wing. Extends from the Tyrol eastwards into Western Asia. — In erebus Stgr. (= manni Kirby) [ now Zygaena mana Kirby, 1892 ], from Armenia, the hindwing is more broadly edged with black, which is the case also in gallica Oberth. [ now Zygaena nevadensis ssp. gallica Oberthür, 1898 ] from Digne, the red colour of forewing being somewhat reduced in this form. — corycia Stgr. from Syria, is rather intensity coloured, but is very much smaller than typical brizae; the forewing strongly rounded and almost elliptical; the black marginal band of hindwing narrow but sharply marked. — Also of brizae there occur specimens with the red streaks interrupted: ab. interrupta Hirschke, and individuals with red abdominal belt: ab. cingulata Dziurz. — Larva grey-yellow; subdorsally black velvety spots behind which there are yellow spots, these bearing black setiferous dots; stigmata, pectoral legs and head black, the last with a light edged frontal triangle. The blackish, posteriorly yellow pupa, lies in a silvery white cocoon.

== Subspecies ==
- Zygaena brizae brizae
- Zygaena brizae araratensis Reiss, 1935
- Zygaena brizae burssensis Reiss, 1928
- Zygaena brizae corycia Staudinger, 1871
- Zygaena brizae drvarica Rauch, 1977
- Zygaena brizae lycaonica Reiss, 1935
- Zygaena brizae ochrida Holik, 1937
- Zygaena brizae staudingeriana Reiss, 1932
- Zygaena brizae tbilisica Reiss & Reiss, 1973
- Zygaena brizae trikalica Reiss, 1977
- Zygaena brizae tsibilisica G. & H. Reiss, 1973
- Zygaena brizae vesubiana Le Charles, 1933

== Biology ==
The larva feeds on Cirsium arvense. The moth flies in June and July.

== Bibliography ==
- Šašić, Martina; Nahirnić, Ana; Tarmann, Gerhard M. (2016-12-31). "Zygaenidae (Lepidoptera) in the Lepidoptera collections of the Croatian Natural History Museum". Natura Croatica: Periodicum Musei Historiae Naturalis Croatici. 25 (2): 233–248. doi:10.20302/NC.2016.25.19. eISSN 1848-7386.
