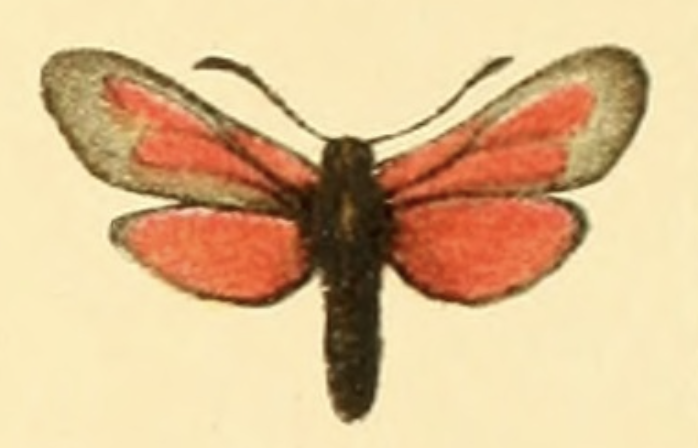

Scientific classification
- Domain: Eukaryota
- Kingdom: Animalia
- Phylum: Arthropoda
- Class: Insecta
- Order: Lepidoptera
- Family: Zygaenidae
- Genus: Zygaena
- Species: Z. mana

Binomial name
- Zygaena mana Kirby, 1892

Synonyms
- Anthrocera mana Kirby, 1892; Zygaena erebus Staudinger, 1867; Zygaena erebaea Burgeff, 1926; Zygaena chaos Burgeff, 1926; Zygaena mana rjabovi Holik, 1939

= Zygaena mana =

Species of moth

Zygaena mana is a species of moth in the Zygaenidae family. It is found in Adshara Gebiet, Georgia, "Transkaukasien" and Armenia. It is similar to Zygaena brizae but differs in that the hindwing is more broadly edged with black.
