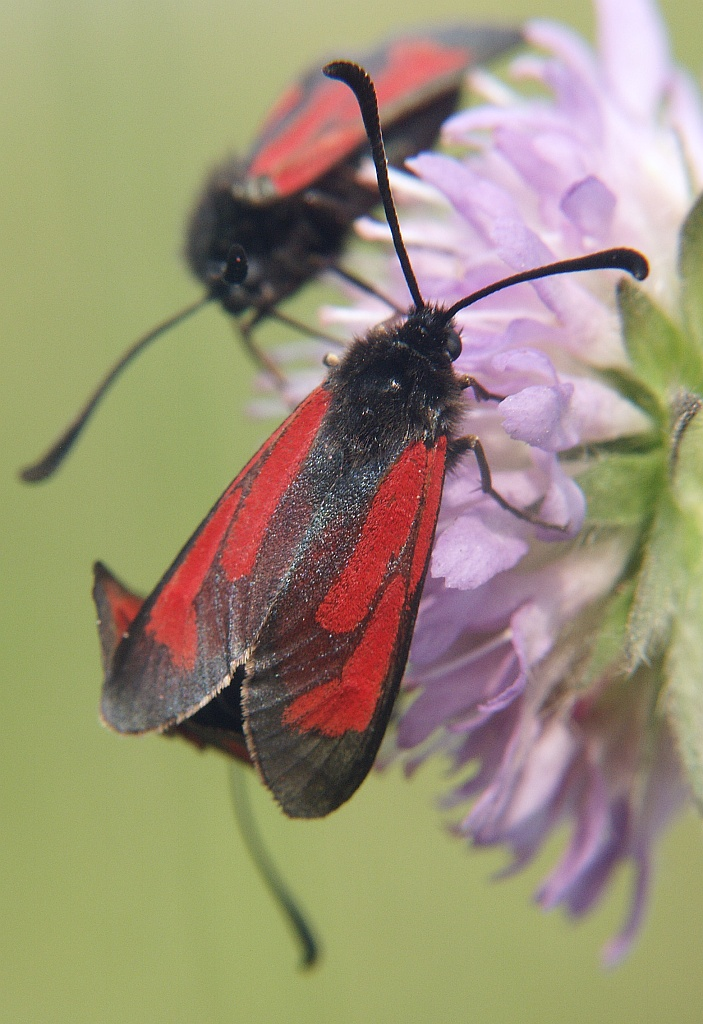

Scientific classification
- Domain: Eukaryota
- Kingdom: Animalia
- Phylum: Arthropoda
- Class: Insecta
- Order: Lepidoptera
- Family: Zygaenidae
- Genus: Zygaena
- Species: Z. minos

Binomial name
- Zygaena minos (Denis & Schiffermüller, 1775)

Synonyms
- Sphinx minos Denis & Schiffermüller, 1775; Zygaena pimpinellae Guhn, 1931

= Zygaena minos =

Species of moth

Zygaena minos is a member of the family Zygaenidae. It is found in most of Europe, except Ireland, Great Britain, the Benelux, the Iberian Peninsula and Norway. It is very similar to Zygaena purpuralis with which it forms a species complex and only separable by genital preparation or by the larval foodplant. The wingspan is 33–37 mm. It flies in June and July.The white-gray larvae feed on Pimpinella saxifraga and Eryngium species.

The species is only found in a few places in Denmark, and the population there is slowly declining.

== Subspecies ==
- Zygaena minos minos
- Zygaena minos normanna Verity 1922
- Zygaena minos peloponnesica Holik, 1937
- Zygaena minos sareptensis Rebel, 1901
- Zygaena minos viridescens Burgeff, 1926

== Bibliography ==
- Top-Jensen, M. & M. Fibiger. 2009. Danmarks sommerfugle. Bugbook Publisher. ISBN 9788799351206.
