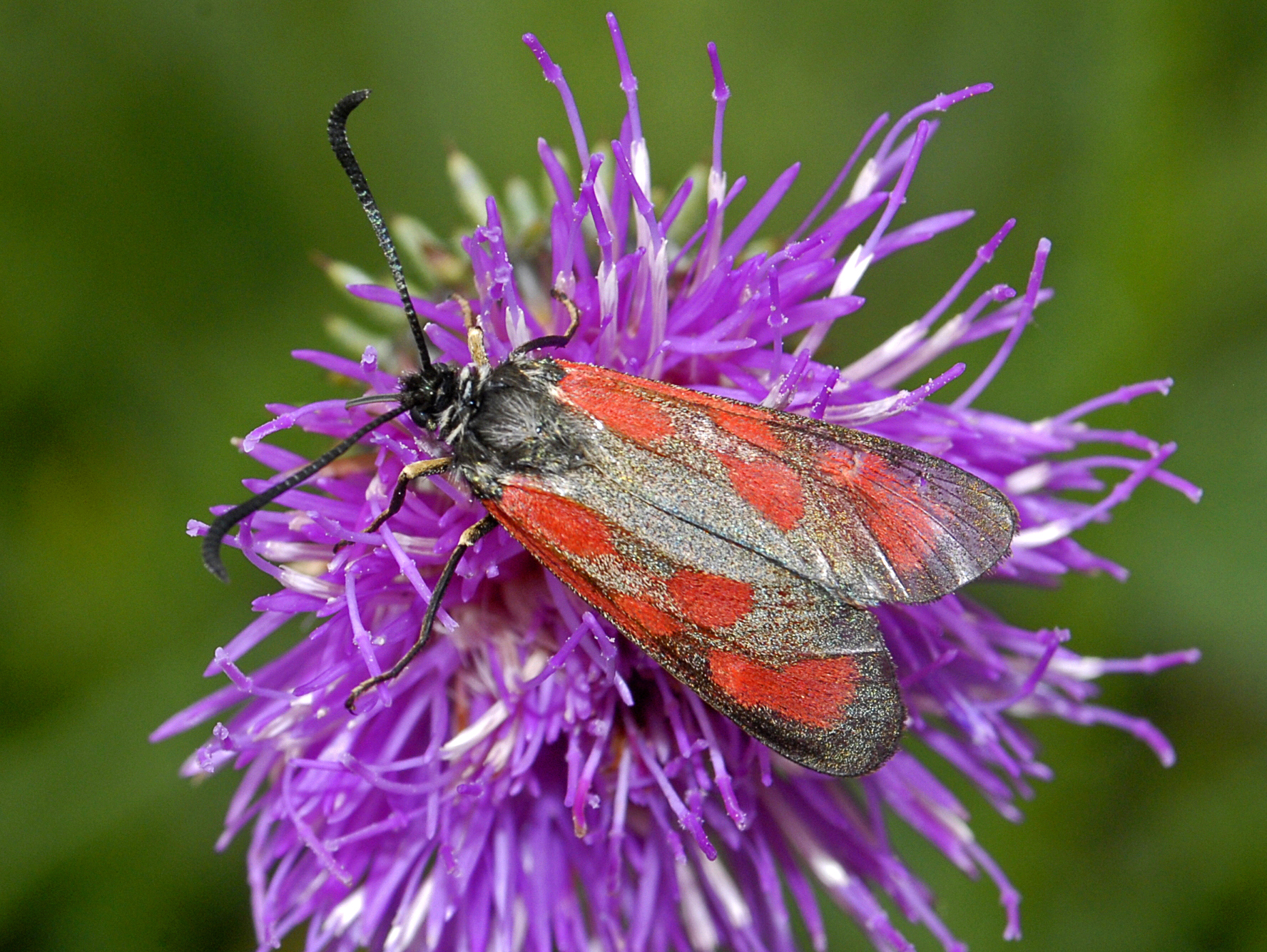
- Zygaena loti, dorsal view
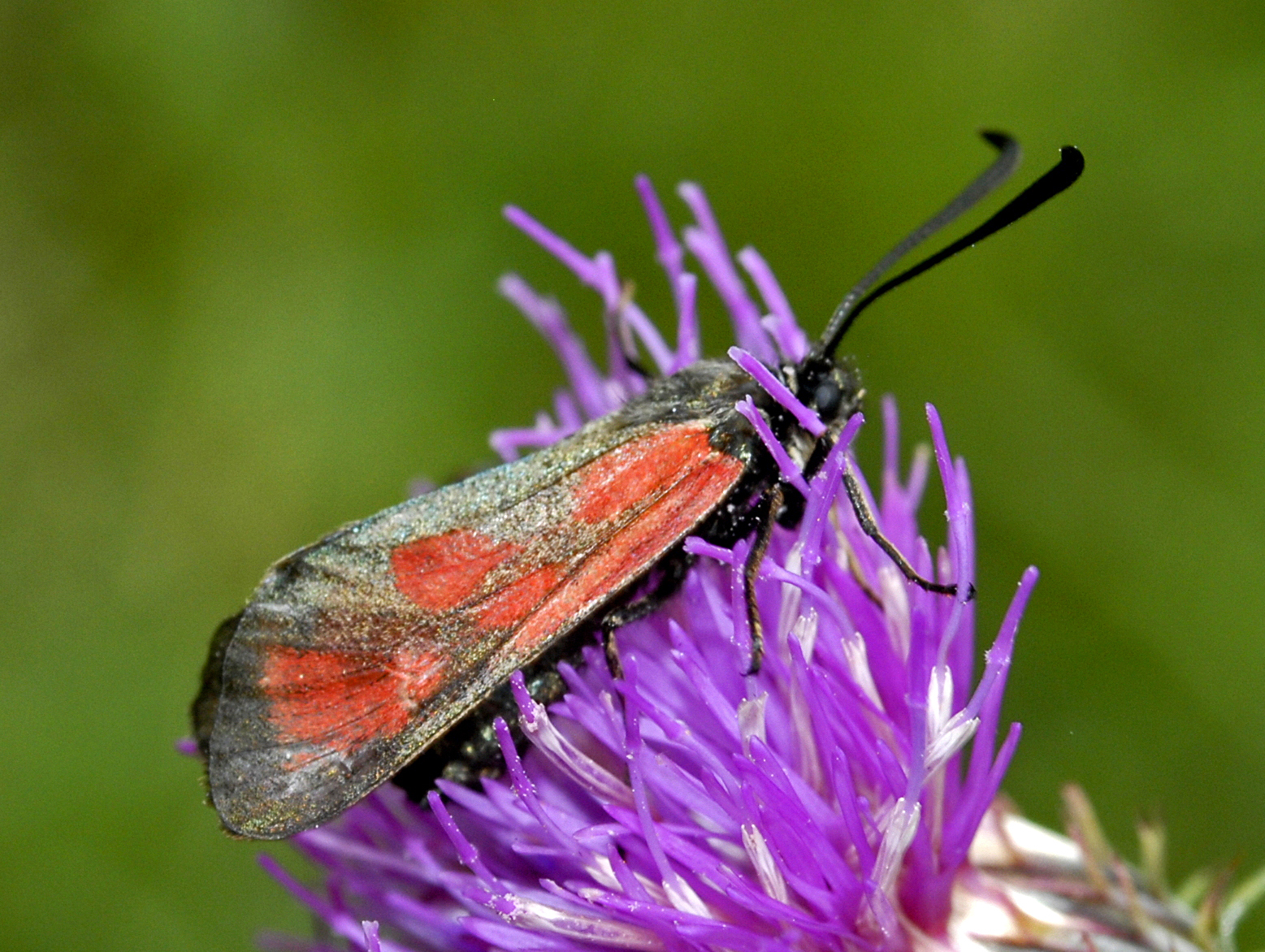
- Lateral view

Scientific classification
- Kingdom: Animalia
- Phylum: Arthropoda
- Class: Insecta
- Order: Lepidoptera
- Family: Zygaenidae
- Genus: Zygaena
- Species: Z. loti

Binomial name
- Zygaena loti (Denis & Schiffermüller, 1775)

Synonyms
- List: Sphinx loti Denis & Schiffermuller, 1775; Sphinx achilleae Esper, 1780; Anthrocera scotica Rowland-Brown, 1919

= Zygaena loti =

Slender Scotch burnet

Species of moth

Zygaena loti, the slender Scotch burnet, is a moth of the family Zygaenidae. It is a diurnal moth characterized by a black body, light colored legs, and red spots on its wings. The caterpillars are a yellow-green color and usually molt out of dormancy in late February to early March. The larvae feed on plants from the family Fabaceae until they enter their pupal stage and mature into adults in May to early June. For mating, Zygaenidae exhibit a dual-partner finding strategy, where females use pheromones while assuming a calling position, and males exhibit a patrolling behavior where they utilize both vision and the olfactory receptors in their antennae to locate a potential mate. Although regionally endangered as their population is declining, Z. loti is found all across Europe, inhabiting areas rich in their desired food plants: lime-rich, and characterized by a hot and dry climate. The decreases in their population are likely due to factors such as habitat loss and fragmentation brought on by commercial agriculture and urbanization, as well as global climate change. There are few conservation programs currently focusing on Zygaena loti.

== Subspecies ==
The following subspecies are recognized:

- Zygaena loti loti (the nominate subspecies)
- Zygaena loti achilleae (Esper, 1780)
- Zygaena loti alpestris Burgeff, 1914
- Zygaena loti arragonensis Staudinger, 1887
- Zygaena loti avilensis Koch, 1948
- Zygaena loti balcanica Reiss, 1922
- Zygaena loti erythristica Tremewan & Manley, 1969
- Zygaena loti failliei Dujardin, 1970
- Zygaena loti hypochlora Dujardin, 1964
- Zygaena loti janthina Boisduval, 1828
- Zygaena loti ligustica Rocci, 1913
- Zygaena loti macedonica Burgeff, 1926
- Zygaena loti miniacea Oberthur, 1910
- Zygaena loti osthelderi Burgeff, 1926
- Zygaena loti praeclara Burgeff, 1926
- Zygaena loti restricta Stauder, 1915
- Zygaena loti scotica (Rowland-Brown, 1919)
- Zygaena loti tristis Oberthur, 1884
- Zygaena loti wagneri Milliere, 1885
- Zygaena loti zobeli Reiss, 1921

== Description ==
Zygaena loti, also called the slender Scotch burnet moth, is a member of the butterfly and moth order Lepidoptera and the family Zygaenidae. While most moths are categorized as nocturnal, Zygaenidae moths are unique in that they are day-flying or diurnal moths. The Z. loti has also been described as highly sedentary. With a wingspan of 25-35mm, the slender Scotch burnet moth can be identified as having a relatively small black body, light colored legs, and a pair of black or light brown colored, rounded wings with red spots. This moth in particular displays a sexual dimorphism, in which the wings of females are scaled much lighter than their male conspecifics and they possess a double white ruff. Frontwings are grayish-blue in the males, yellow-gray in the females, with six red spots which partly flow together. The kidney-shaped spot at the tip of the forewings consists in fact of the fifth and sixth spots, which have grown together. The hindwings are red and have a black border.

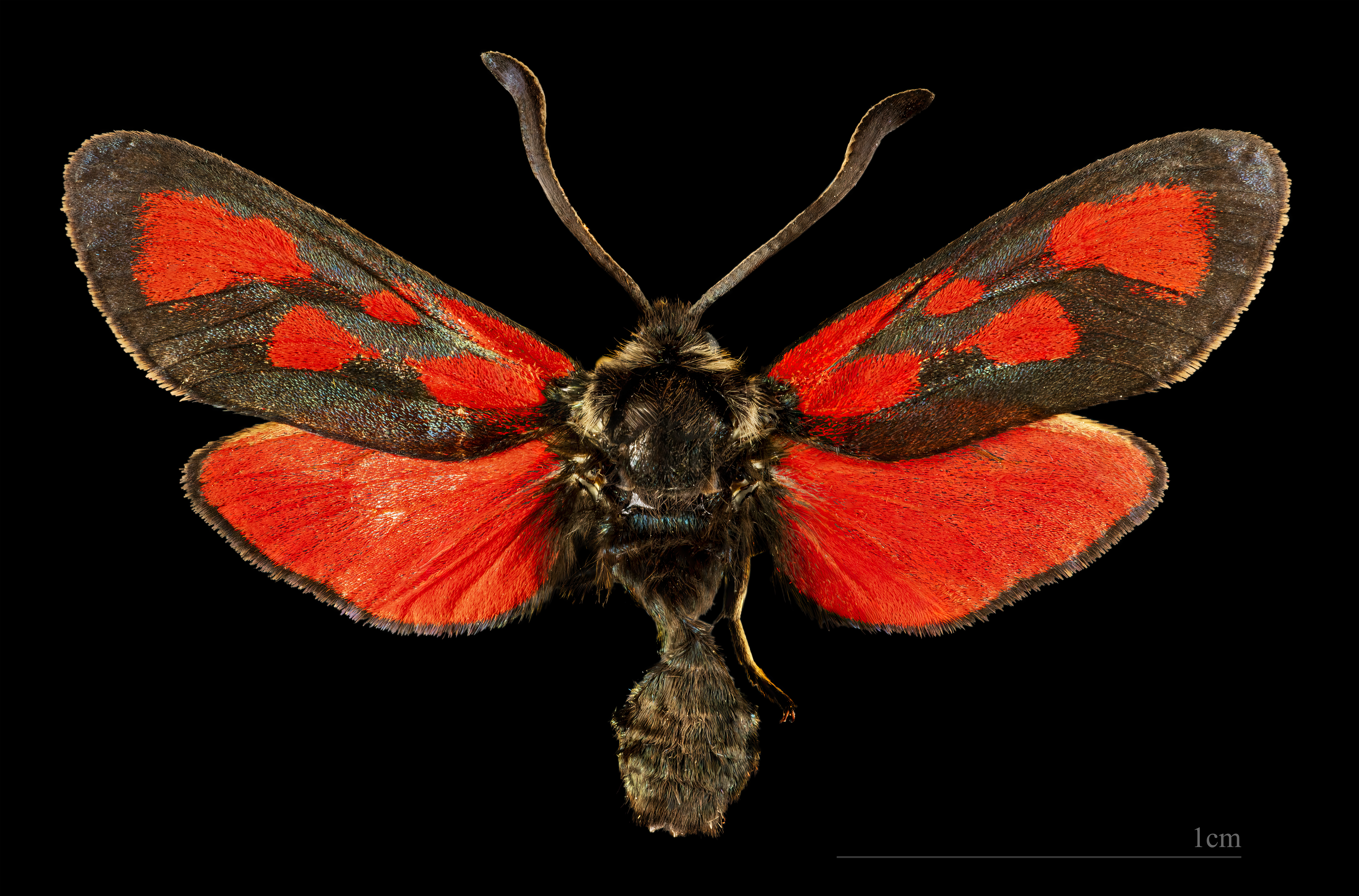
♀

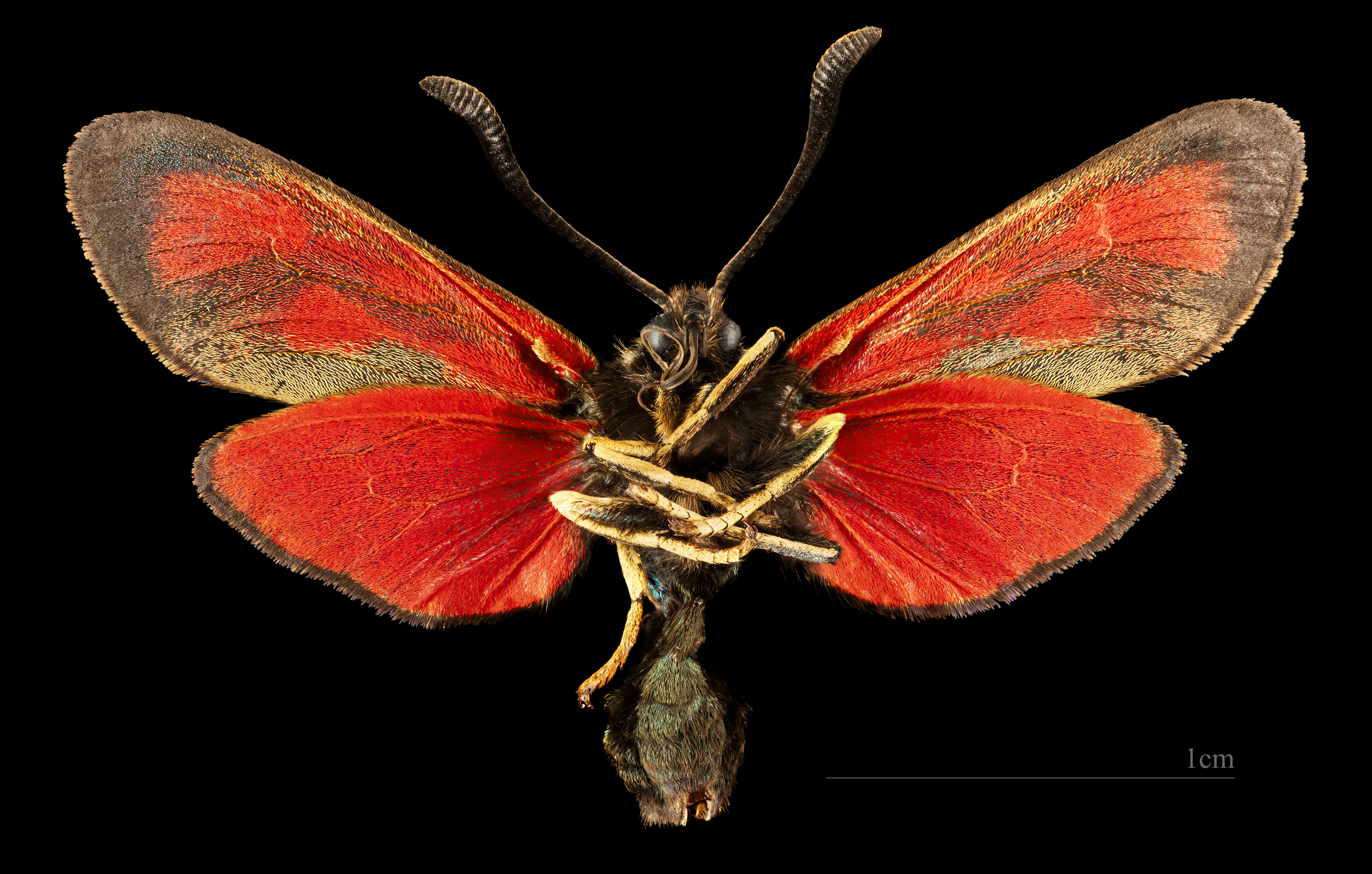
♀ △

This species is rather similar to Zygaena exulans, Zygaena filipendulae and Zygaena lonicerae.

The caterpillars can reach a length of about 20 millimetres (0.79 in). They are olive-green or yellow-green, with two yellow and two black dots on each segment and short white hairs.

== Life cycle ==
The life cycle of Zygaena loti has not been well observed, but from the available literature the following likely life cycle can be constructed. The moth is characterized as an early burnet with caterpillars molting out of diapause in late February to early March. The caterpillars hide during the day in moss layers or herbage containing small, short plants less than 6 cm tall. There they also construct or spin their cocoons (oval-shaped, dull dirty whitish color) to enter their pupal stage. later mature into adult moths in May to early June. As adults, their flight time is somewhere from late May to early August depending on eclosion. Since they are diurnal, they only fly during the day. After mating, females will lay their eggs on larval food plants, such as the ones listed below, and the resulting larvae will feed from approximately August to early May, overwintering once and sometimes twice in their larval diapaused state.

=== Food resources ===
For larvae, there are some contrasting findings, but all observed food plants that Z. loti caterpillars have been found on are from the family Fabaceae, such as Hippocrepis comosa, Lotus corniculatus, Securigera varia, and Onobrychis vicilfolia.

For adult moths, even less has been recorded about their diets. Males may nectar on milkworts and thyme, while females may nectar on the flowers of the plants they ate in their larval stage (those listed above).

== Reproduction ==
While there is not much evidence pertaining to Zygaena loti's reproductive strategies in particular, there have been studies involving that species and other Zygaenidae that have looked at the mating routine of the family as a whole. Zygaenidae exhibit a dual partner-finding strategy, which is typical for most moths. That essentially means that both the females and the males are involved in the process of finding a mate. Females possess pheromone glands in their ovipositor, which is positioned at the tip of their abdomen. From those glands, they release a certain pheromone meant to attract their male conspecifics. There is evidence pointing towards females not using pheromones in the morning hours of the day, but more research is needed to confirm that as fact. Females also exhibit a calling behavior. This involves the females in a calling position where the region containing the sex pheromone gland is left exposed, allowing for the release of the pheromone. In Zygaenidae, most female moths will call for five to ten hours a day until they have found a mate.

For males, they exhibit what is called patrolling behavior, a behavior observed to only occur in the morning. In the morning, when the males are patrolling, they detect females via vision at long distances, but in the afternoon, they use the olfactory receptors on the ends of their antennae which are sensitive to the pheromones of their female conspecifics. Males may also release their own pheromones when in close proximity to a potential mate, but once again, more research is needed.

Once mating has occurred, females will lay their eggs on larval foodplants, usually Fabaceaes. Studies have shown that a specific microclimate may be vital to the females when deciding where to lay their eggs, but as far as most research has shown, females lay their eggs in bare soil around herbage vital to the larvae's diet.

In the close range phase of courtship, while the role of pheromones is not well known, it has been determined that visual cues from both the male and the female are important. Experts acknowledge the gap in literature and need for more research on the mating activity of Zygaenidae and have expressed the importance of studying the chemical communication of diurnal butterflies and moths for natural resource management when dealing with invasive species and conservation efforts of endangered species. Pheromones have been used many times to study Lepidopteran species and can be used to monitor and study rare Zygaenids such as the Zygaena loti.

== Geographic range and habitat ==
The geographic distribution of Zygaena loti is well documented, but not uniform across research studies. Some documentation cites Zygaena loti to be mainly in western Scotland and solely confined to the Isles Mull and Ulva. The research that claims this however is only looks at the subspecies scotica. The animals in the family Zygaenidae are actually widespread across the European continent. More specifically, Zygaena loti is found in most of Europe, except Ireland, the Netherlands, Portugal, Fennoscandia, Denmark, Estonia and Latvia. This species has been spotted in Spain on the Iberian peninsula, across central and southern Europe, and to Siberia. While it is not very common in northern Europe, there is an isolated population in Scotland. They used to be widely distributed, creating a network of interconnected communities, but due to habitat loss as a likely result of an increase use of land for agriculture, most Z. loti and Zygaenidae populations have become fragmented and isolated from each other. The isolation that these moths are subjected to has led to high levels of genetic differentiation between populations. The current status of the moth's total distribution range since the 1970s is declining.

Although fairly widespread, Z. loti can only survive in a restricted range of habitats, making them a good indicator for environmental change, a factor that many conservationists have focused on. This moth is usually restricted to xerothermic environments, meaning it thrives in a hot and dry climate. They also greatly prefer lime-rich conditions. Such suitable habitats may include flowering meadows, clearings, subalpine or rocky slopes, scrubland, forest edges, limestone background, or dry grassland, usually at an elevation up to 2,100 metres (6,900 ft) above sea level. For Zygaenidae in general, the Alps and Pyrenees are considered to be biodiversity hotspots.

== Conservation status and efforts ==
Zygaena loti is not endangered and is considered a common burnet moth. Regionally, however, this species of Zygaenidae is decreasing due to habitat loss and fragmentation. Such habitat loss is likely because of an increase in large-scale agriculture and urbanization. Being that Z. loti require a certain climate (dry and hot) and have certain conditions for their chosen habitat (lime-rich and herb-rich), human intervention in acceptable habitats has led to the further isolation and fragmentation of this moth species, causing a decrease in their distribution range; however, Z. loti continue to survive in fragmented habitats with reduced gene flow. That reduced gene flow causes a decrease in genetic diversities but an increase in genetic differentiation between populations and an increase in inbreeding as well. While loss of suitable land is a big factor to consider, there is also the matter of global climate change and global warming, which has caused an observed latidinal shift in many Lepitopteran species, although there is no current studies on how climate change and global warming has affected Z. loti. With habitat loss and climate change working together and against the isolated moth populations, research has suggested that Zygaena loti's regional endangerment is not due to habitat loss, but due to genetic distortion resulting from too rapid habitat change, meaning that Z. loti may not be able to evolve at the appropriate pace needed for its survival. There has been a lot of studies dedicated to the conservation of this family of moths and one of the recommendations that sticks out that most in increasing habitat connectivity between populations to increase gene flow and save Zygaena loti from possible extinction.

The majority of the research literature on Zygaena loti is based on conservation efforts that may be useful in helping the isolated moth species. As mentioned previously, many studies recommend that the only way to save Z. loti is to reconnect the fragmented habitats and populations of the moth to increase gene flow between populations, restoring the once large, interconnected network of Zygaenidae and its high genetic diversity. A smaller study focused more on the idea of restoring suitable habitats by reducing agricultural use of mineral fertilizers, insecticides, and herbicides, which was hypothesized to be one of the factors causing the decline of Z. loti and a decrease in food plant availability. That same study also recommended that work needed to be done to maintain current suitable habitats by preventing the overgrowth of those xerothermic clearings and grasslands. One way to accomplish that is mowing. Research has shown that the effects of manual mowing can be positive. By using butterflies and moths as a rapidly responding indicator of its effects, manual mowing was shown to increase species richness and composition in the habitats where it was implicated, quickly leading to a habitat with a high conservation value. In a study on the effects of reintroduced manual mowing, it was concluded that mowing may present a great resource and tool for increasing the abundance of Lepitopteran species and promoting potentially endangered species such as Zygaena loti.

There are relatively few current, ongoing conservation programs geared towards saving Zygaena loti from extinction, but there are two worth mentioning. The Moths Count Project/The National Moth Recording Scheme is run in the United Kingdom and has the simple goal of recording all observed moth species as a way to spread knowledge and promote the conservation of the recorded species. Then there is the Scotland Rural Development Programme, which aims, among other priorities, to protect and improve the environment through certain conservation efforts and to address climate change in rural Scotland. This program's conservation schemes are a model for the assessment of worldwide biodiversity conservation programs. It is important to set clear objectives and assess the cost-effectiveness of a program against those objectives.

While there is some conservation programs out there, experts acknowledge that there are large gaps in the research literature on Zygaena loti and other species that prevents much to be done to prevent possible extinction. More research is needed on Z. loti.

== Gallery ==
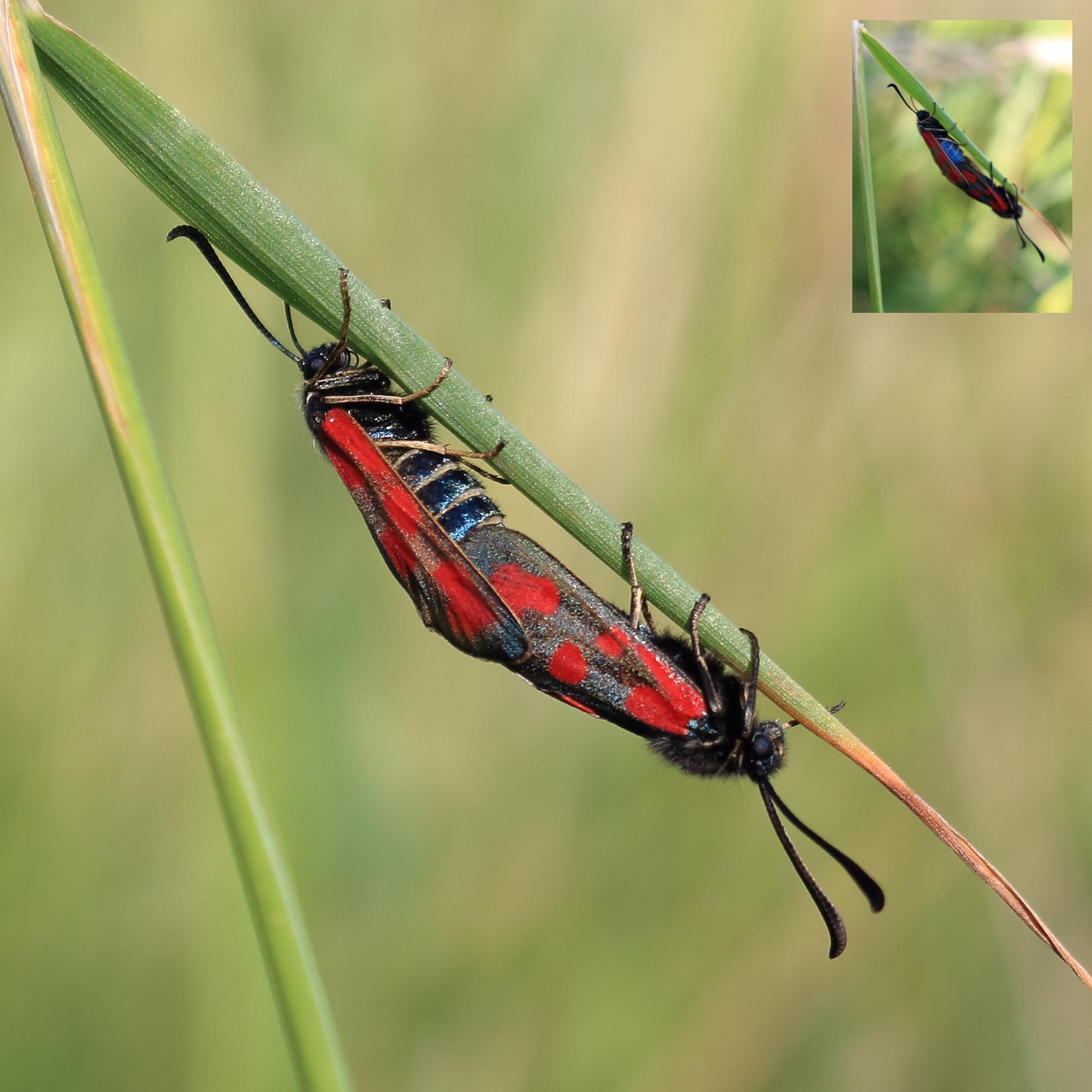
Mating

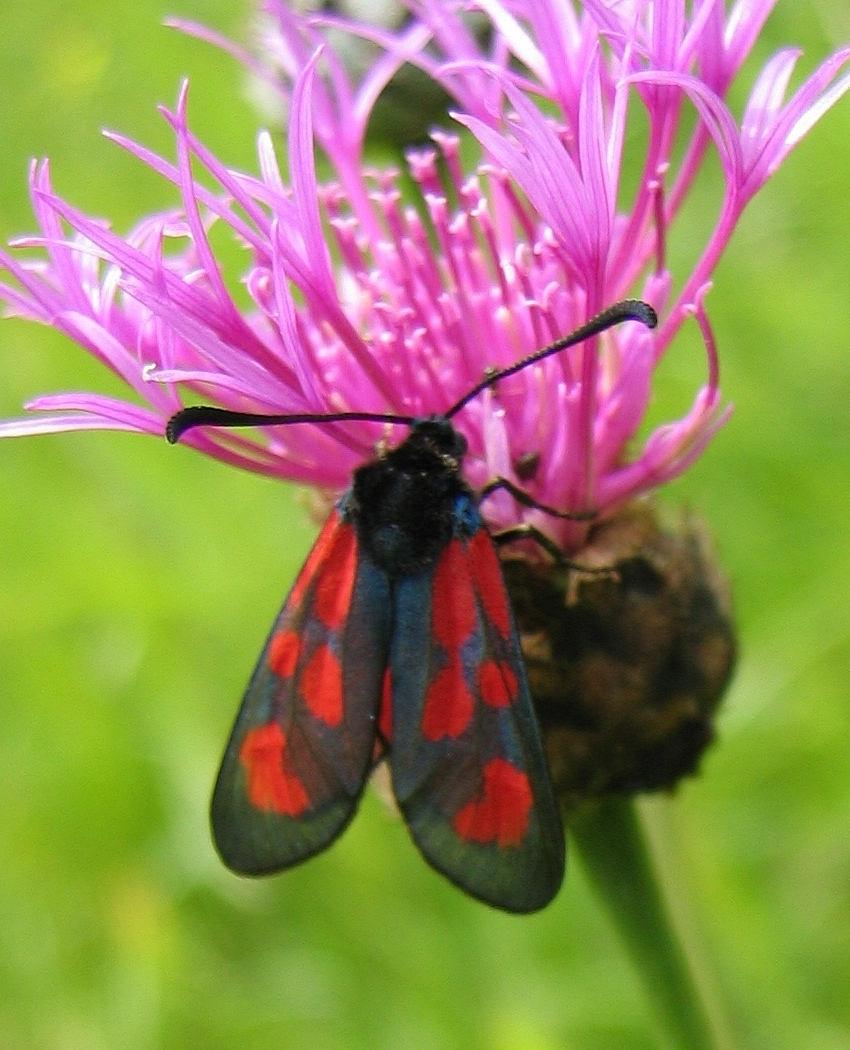
Feeding on Centaurea

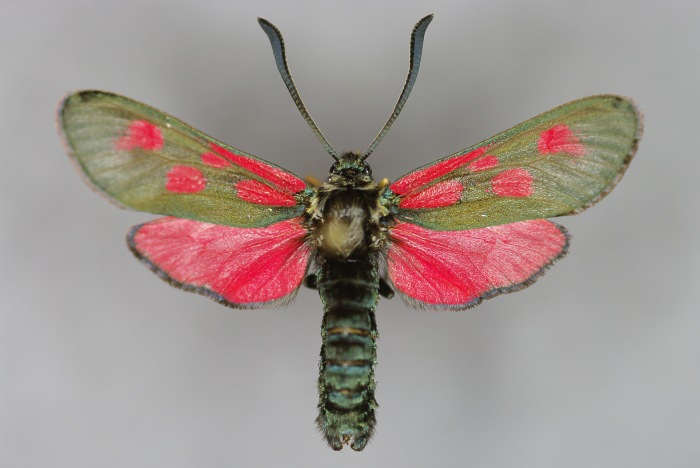
Mounted specimen

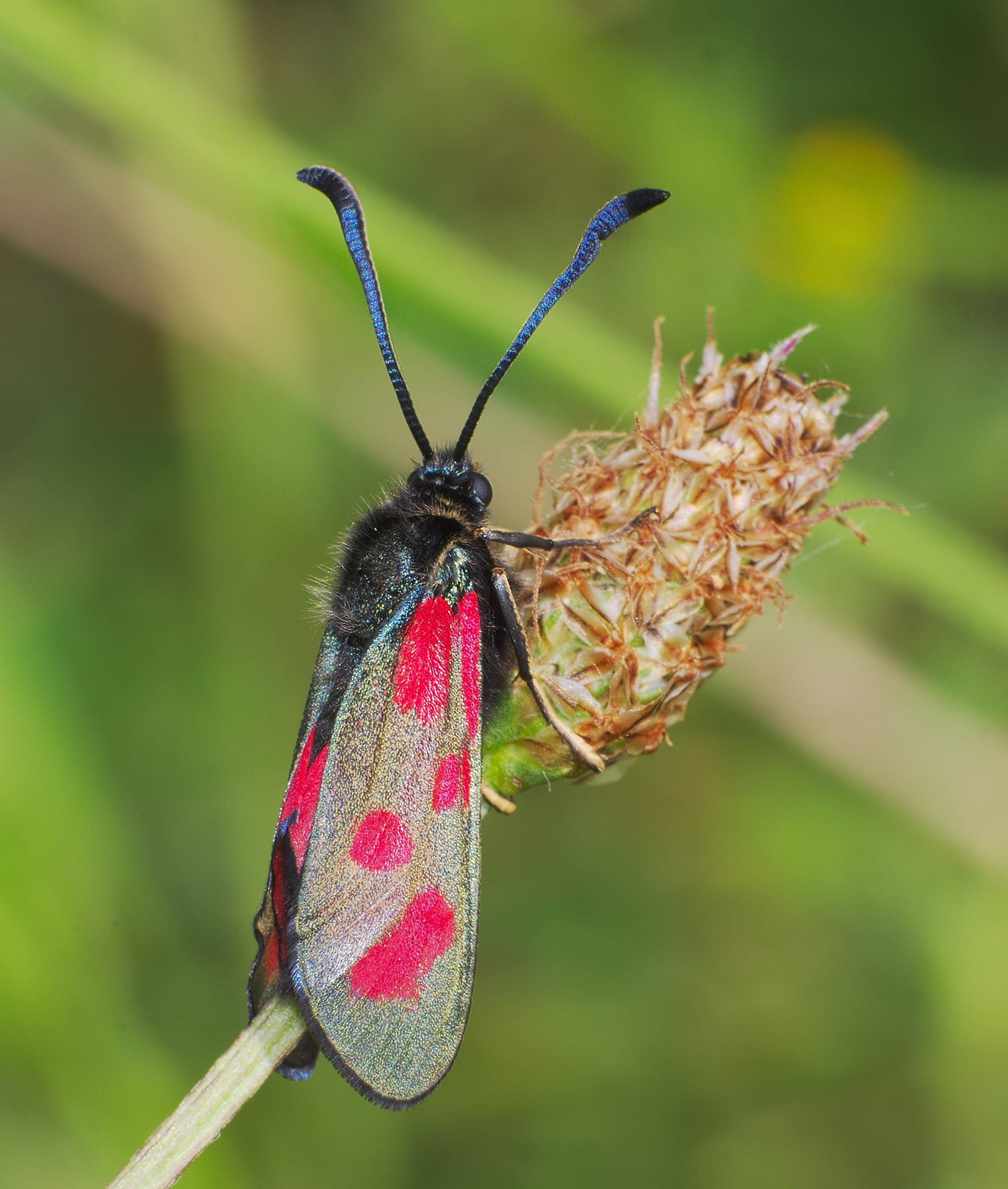
Female

== Bibliography ==
- Šašić, Martina; Nahirnić, Ana; Tarmann, Gerhard M. (2016-12-31). "Zygaenidae (Lepidoptera) in the Lepidoptera collections of the Croatian Natural History Museum". Natura Croatica: Periodicum Musei Historiae Naturalis Croatici. 25 (2): 233–248. doi:10.20302/NC.2016.25.19. eISSN 1848-7386. Useful for subspecies distribution.
