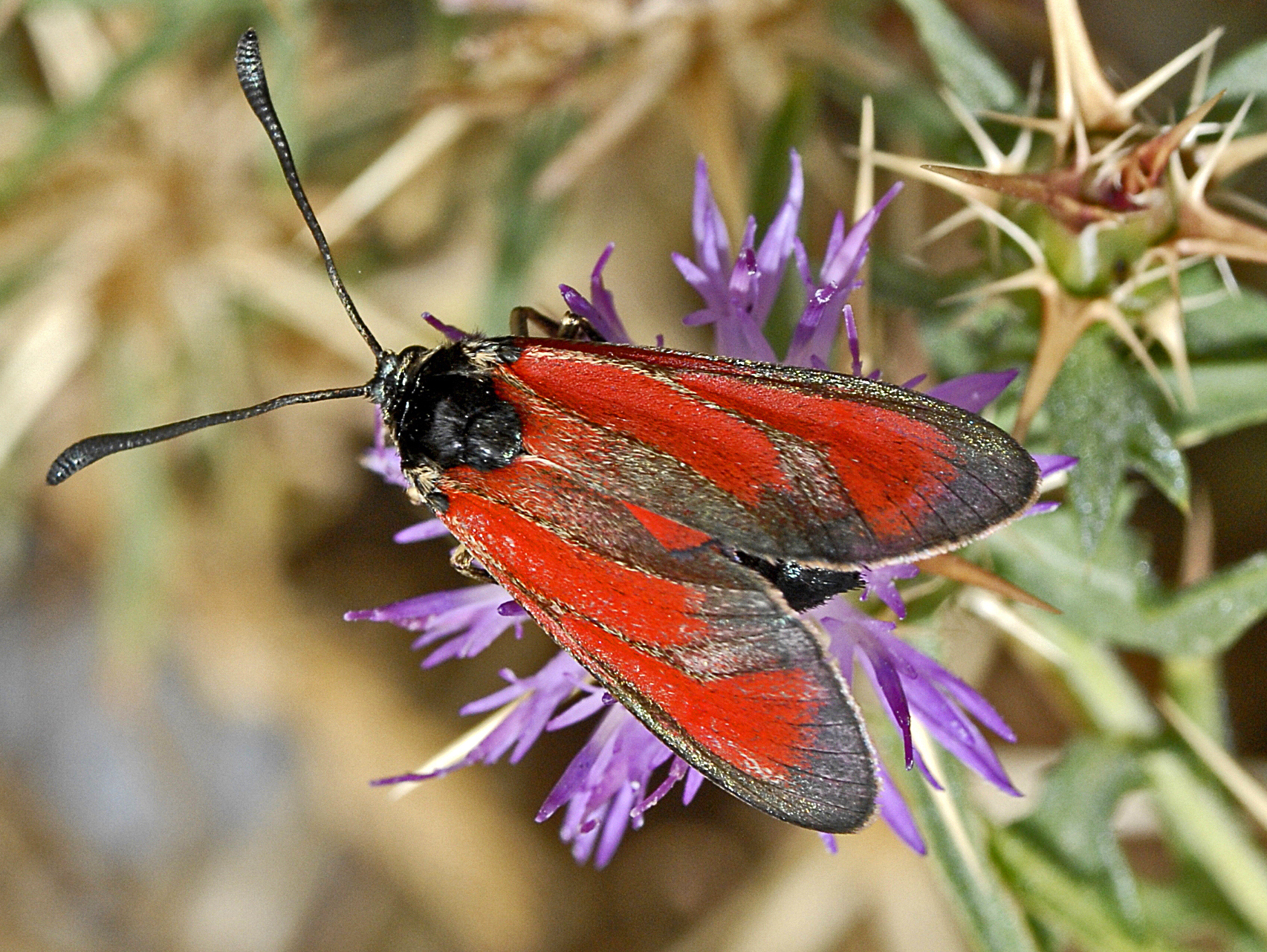
- Zygaena erythrus, dorsal view
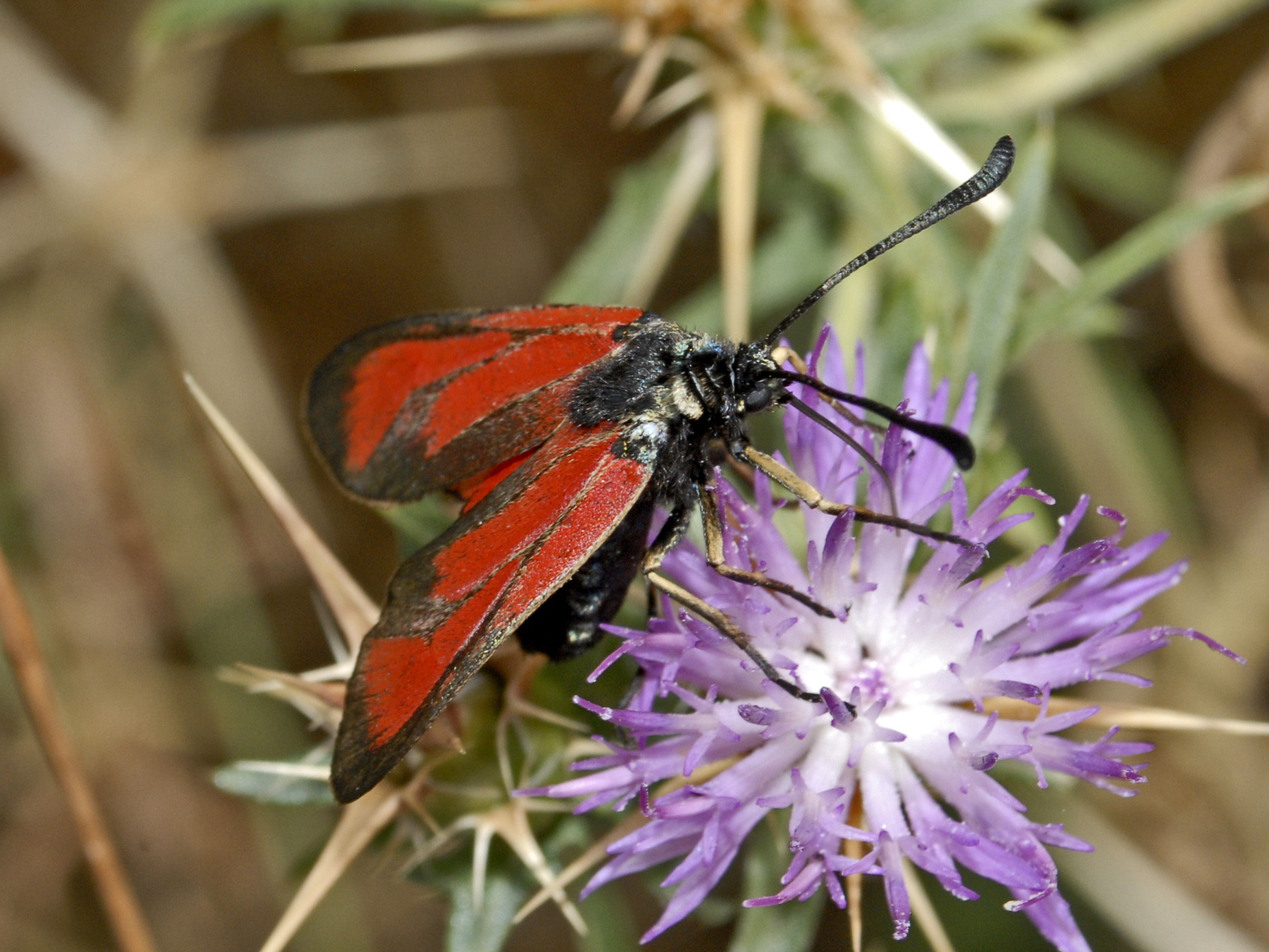
- Lateral view

Scientific classification
- Kingdom: Animalia
- Phylum: Arthropoda
- Class: Insecta
- Order: Lepidoptera
- Family: Zygaenidae
- Genus: Zygaena
- Species: Z. erythrus

Binomial name
- Zygaena erythrus (Hubner, 1806)

= Zygaena erythrus =

Species of moth

Zygaena erythrus, common name sluggish burnet, is a species of moth in the family Zygaenidae.

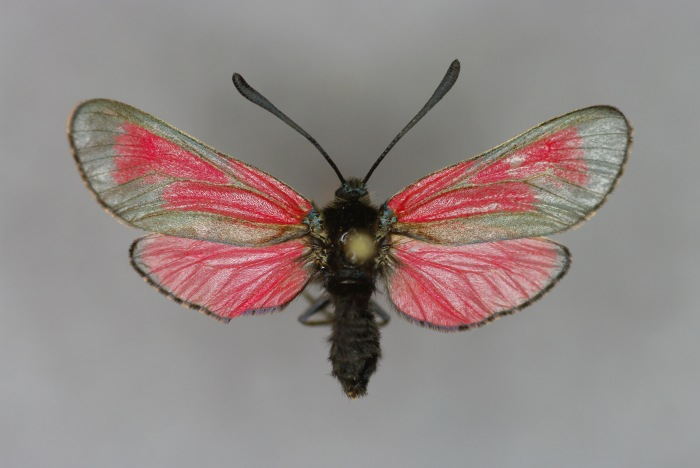
Mounted specimen of Zygaena erythrus

== Subspecies ==
- Zygaena erythrus erythrus
- Zygaena erythrus actae Burgeff, 1926
- Zygaena erythrus miserrima Verity, 1922
- Zygaena erythrus saportae Boisduval, 1829

== Distribution and habitat ==
This endangered species can be found only in France and Italy. It prefers dry and rocky areas with sparse vegetation and limestone substrate, but it is also present in heathlands, in nutrient-poor grasslands and in broad verges in oak forests with the host plant Eryngium species, from sea level to over 1,500 metres (4,900 ft).

== Description ==
Zygaena erythrus has a wingspan of 25–33 mm. These quite large moths show enlarged and confluent red spots on the forewings, surrounded by black in the distal part. Females are little bigger than males, with a yellow golden dusting and less defined markings. The mature larva is rather dark greyish, with two series of dorsal black spots.

This species is very similar to Zygaena purpuralis, but it has red scales in the axillary area of the forewings, up to a third of the length.

== Technical description and variation (Seitz) ==
Z. erythrus Hbn. (= saportae Boisd.; minos Boisd.) (4a). Larger; antenna longer, with thicker club. The red colour of forewing restncted to 3 streaks, the distal one being wedge-shaped; moreover, only the basal third of the hindmargin of forewing is red. South France, Italy and Sicily. In ab. irpina Zickert, from the Riviera, the cuneiform spots are confluent. — As magna [Seitz, [1907] ] (4 a) a very large form from the Abruzzi is sold by Staudinger; the posterior cuneiform spot is strongly widened and distally straight-truncate.— Larva dull greenish yellow, with heavy black dots subdorsally and yellow side-spots (Sapokta); in some districts not distinguishable from the larva of purpuralis. On Eryngium and Thyme (Rouast). Hibernating; pupation at end of May. Imago in June and July; frequently sitting on Thyme and Eryngium.

== Biology ==
The life cycle involves only one generation per year. Adults are on wing from the end of June to the beginning or mid August. The hatching occurs between June and July. The larvae feed on Eryngium species, including Eryngium campestre and Eryngium maritimum. Full-grown larvae can be found from June. Pupation occurs within a cocoon usually adherent to the lower surface of the leaves, but also on the ground between lichens, moss and parts of plants.
