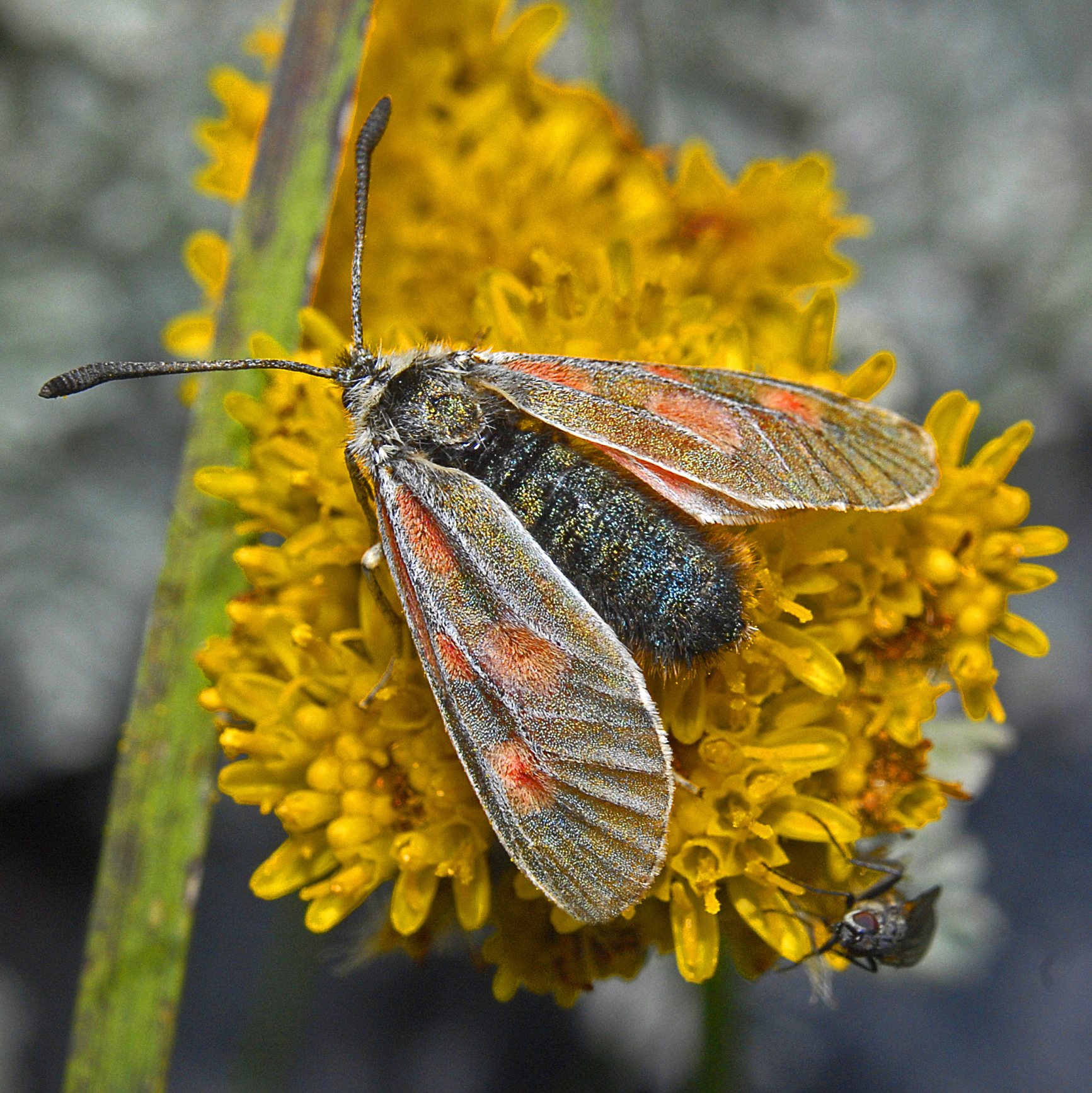
- Zygaena exulans, female

Scientific classification
- Kingdom: Animalia
- Phylum: Arthropoda
- Clade: Pancrustacea
- Class: Insecta
- Order: Lepidoptera
- Family: Zygaenidae
- Genus: Zygaena
- Species: Z. exulans

Binomial name
- Zygaena exulans (Reiner & Hohenwarth, 1792)

Synonyms
- Sphinx exulans Hohenwarth, 1792; Zygaena exulans altaretensis Le Charles, 1942; Zygaena exulans bourgognei Le Charles, 1942

= Zygaena exulans =

Species of moth

Zygaena exulans, the mountain burnet or Scotch burnet, is a moth of the family Zygaenidae.

== Subspecies ==
Subspecies include:

- Zygaena exulans exulans (European Alps)
- Zygaena exulans abruzzina Burgeff, 1926
- Zygaena exulans apfelbecki Rebel, 1910
- Zygaena exulans pyrenaica Burgeff, 1926
- Zygaena exulans subochracea White, 1872
- Zygaena exulans vanadis Dalman, 1816

== Distribution and habitat ==
This species exist in mountainous areas in southern Europe (Alps, Pyrenees, Apennines, Balkans), at an elevation of 1,800–3,000 metres (5,900–9,800 ft) above sea level. It is also present in Scotland, in Scandinavia and in northern Russia. These moths inhabit mountain lawns and northern moors.

== Description ==
Zygaena exulans has a wingspan of 25–33 millimetres (0.98–1.30 in). The body is densely haired. The forewings are black-gray in males, matt gray in the females, almost translucent and with a metallic sheen. They have four distinct red dots and a red basal elongated stain. The spot on the wing root is wedge-shaped, the others are oval or round. The hindwings are red with a gray outer edge and black fringes. The antennae are club-shaped.

These moths have an aposemantic coloration. In the event of an attack by predators such as birds and lizards they emit a liquid containing cyanide.

This species is rather similar to Zygaena lonicerae, Zygaena loti and Zygaena purpuralis.

The eggs are pale yellow, relatively large and oval. The caterpillars can reach a length of about 20 millimetres (0.79 in). They are velvety black, with yellowish markings on each segment and short white hair. The pupa is brown-black and lies in a gray-white, thin cocoon.

== Biology ==
Adults usually fly in sunshine from late May to September, depending on the location. Larvae feed on crowberry (Empetrum nigrum) in northern Europe. Elsewhere they are polyphagous, mainly feeding on Helianthemum nummularium, Anthyllis vulneraria, Dryas octopetala, Silene acaulis, Astragalus alpinus, Carex, Polygonum viviparum, Salix, Thymus, Vaccinium uliginosum, Chamorchis alpina, Betula nana, Viscaria alpina, Thalictrum alpinum, Cassiope tetragona, Bartsia alpina and Saxifraga aizoides. This species hibernates in the form of a larva.

== Gallery ==
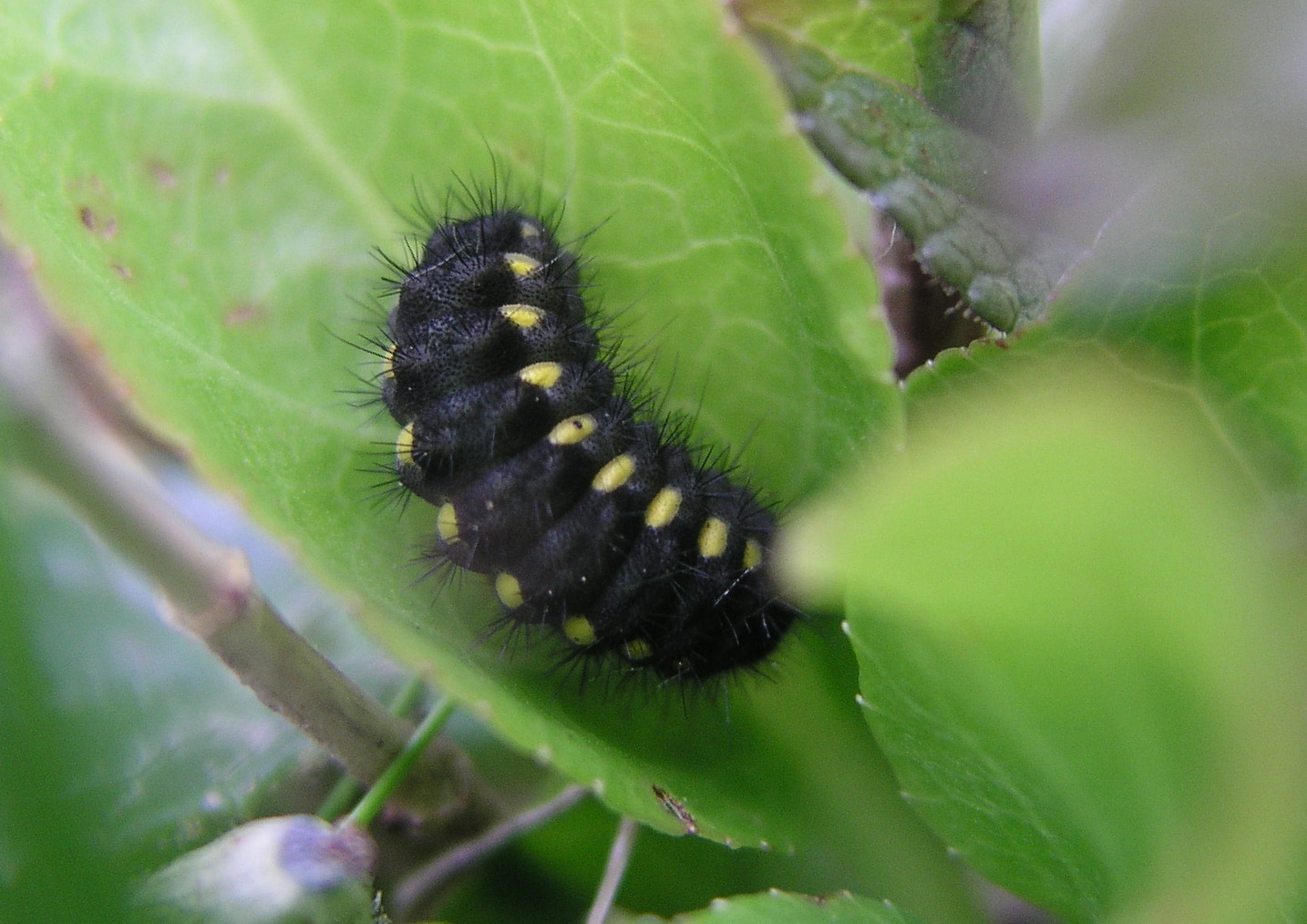
Caterpillar

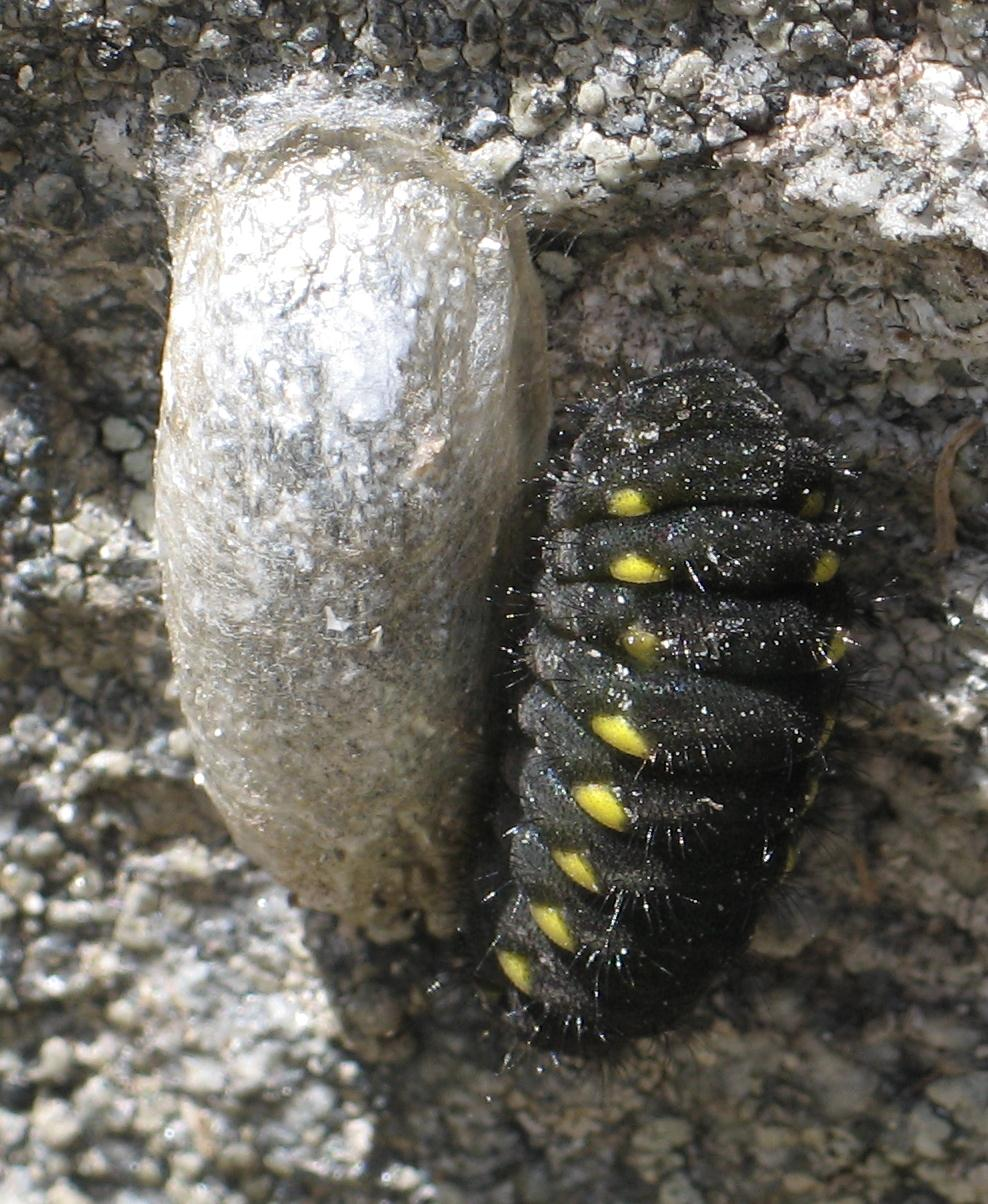
Caterpillar and pupa

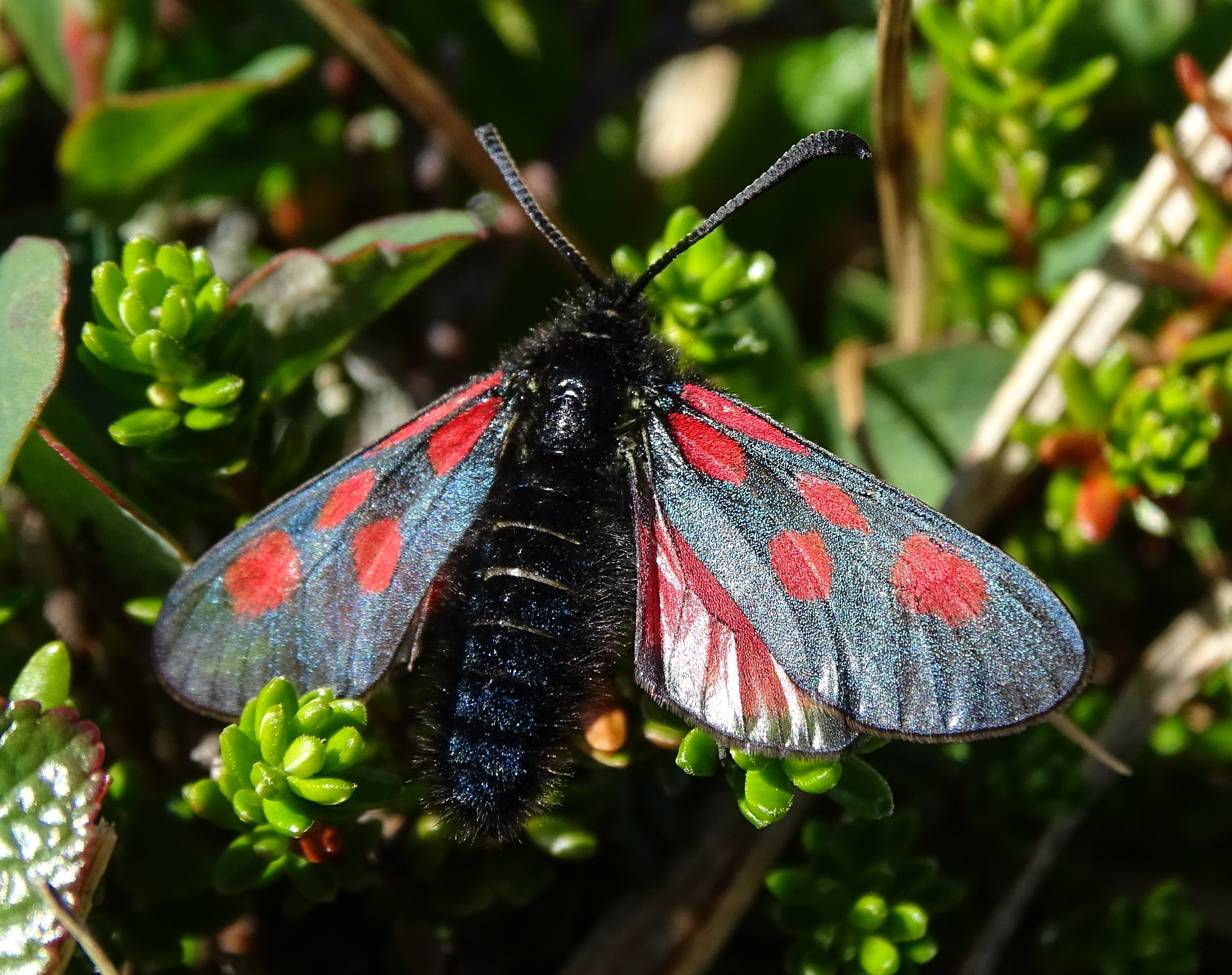
Moth

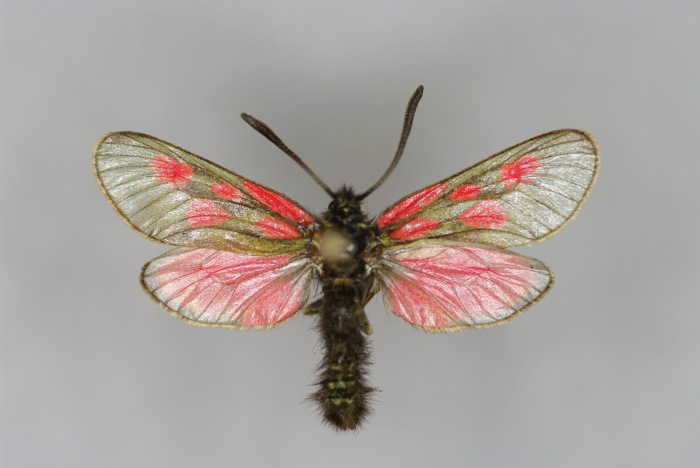
Mounted specimen
