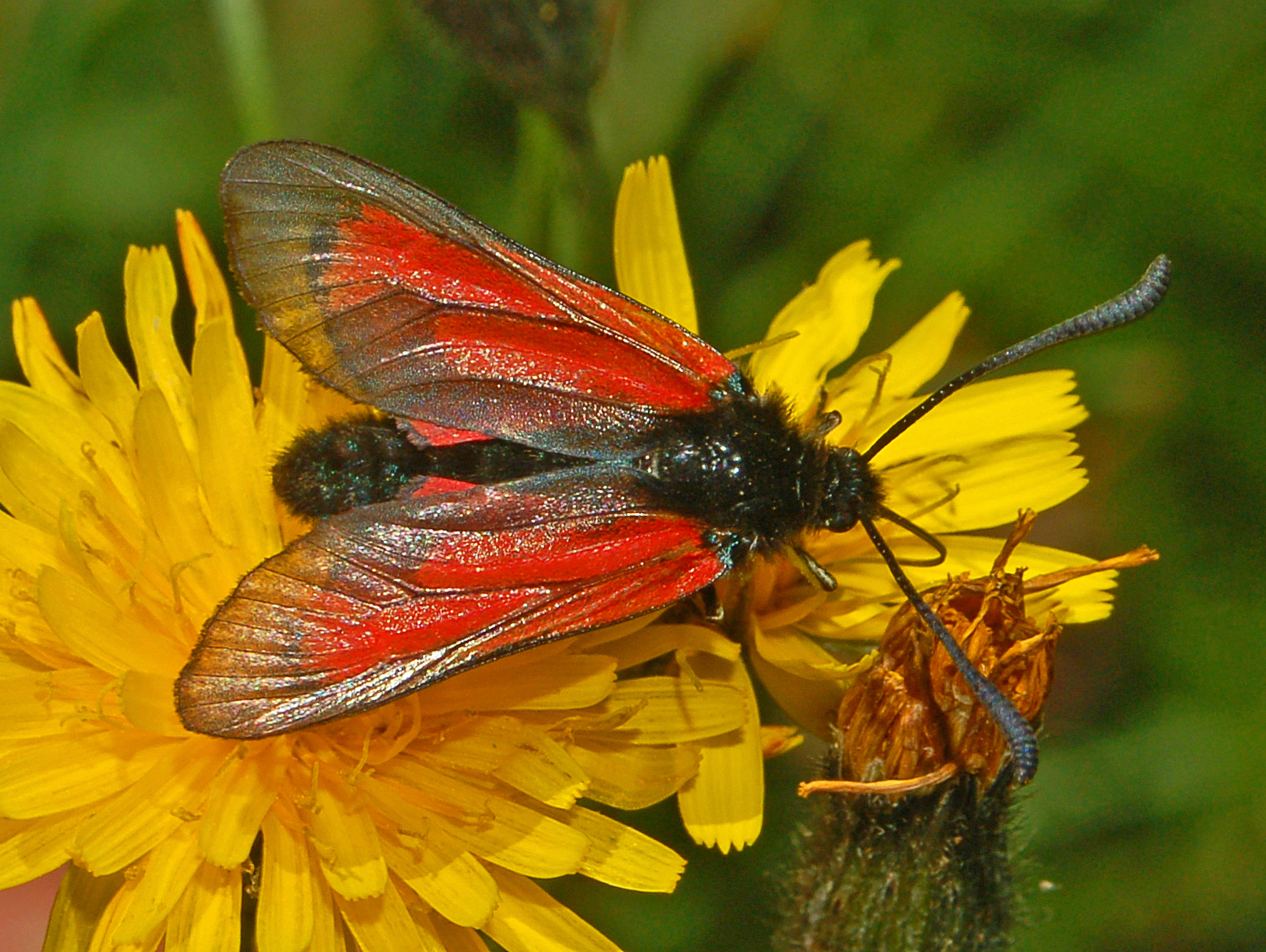
- Dorsal view
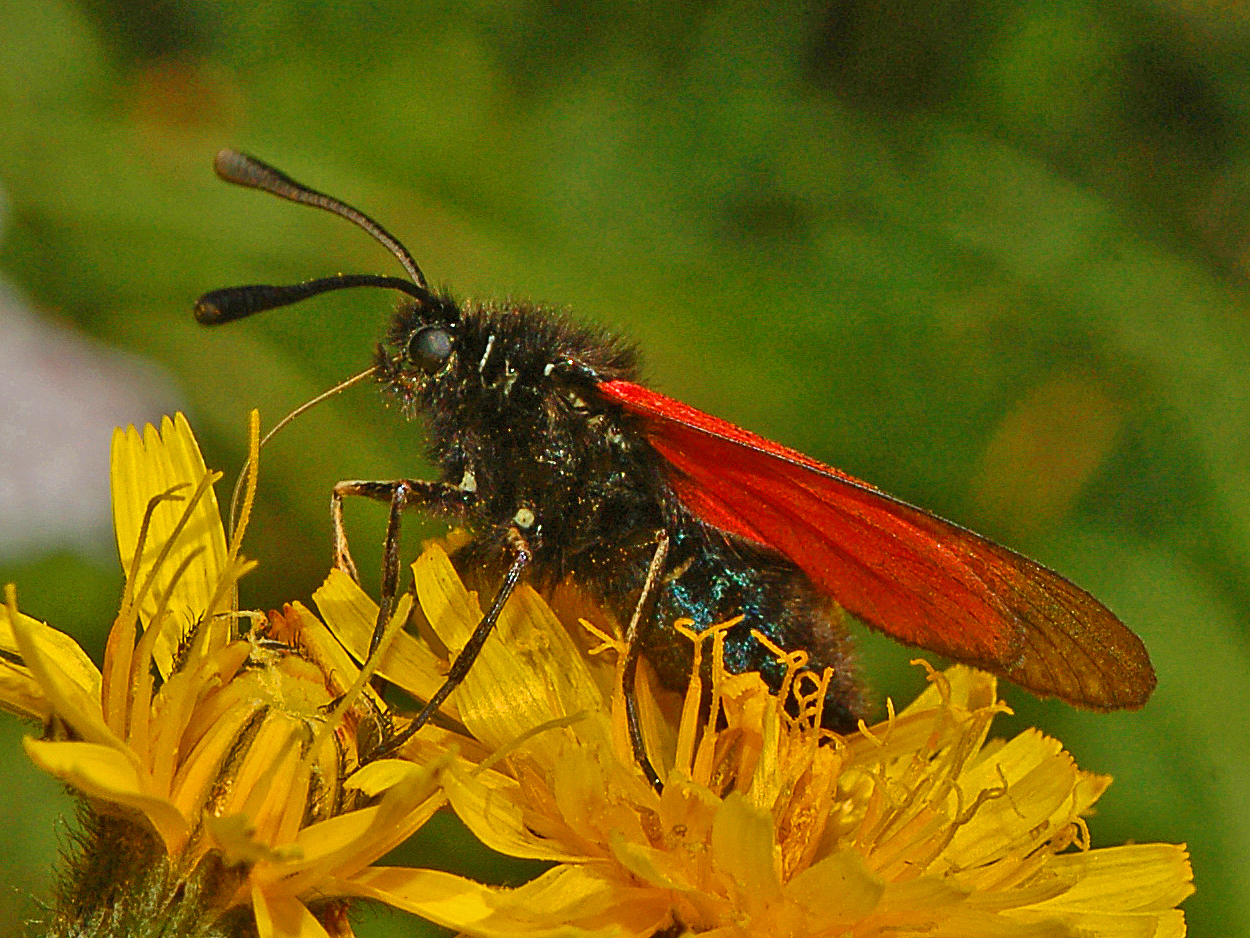
- Ventral view

Scientific classification
- Kingdom: Animalia
- Phylum: Arthropoda
- Class: Insecta
- Order: Lepidoptera
- Family: Zygaenidae
- Genus: Zygaena
- Species: Z. purpuralis

Binomial name
- Zygaena purpuralis (Brünnich, 1763)

Synonyms
- List: Zygaena reissi Burgeff, 1926; Zygaena reissiana Burgeff, 1926; Zygaena reissoides Koch, 1942; Zygaena hibernica Reiss, 1933; Zygaena simferopolica Reiss, 1939; Zygaena guhni Reiss, 1940; Zygaena neumanni Reiss, 1940; Zygaena purpurella Reiss, 1953; Zygaena fatrensis Reiss, 1940; Zygaena subalpicola Reiss, 1940; Zygaena bezauensis Reiss, 1940

= Zygaena purpuralis =

Transparent burnet

Species of moth

Zygaena purpuralis, the transparent burnet, is a moth of the family Zygaenidae.

== Description ==
Zygaena purpuralis is a medium-sized moth with a wingspan reaching 30–34 millimetres (1.2–1.3 in). Usually the forewings show three bright red longitudinal streaks quite variable in shape, with almost transparent greyish-bluish edges. Hindwings are more extensively or almost completely bright red. Head and thorax are black, while the abdomen is dark blue. Larvae are yellow, with some lines of small black spots.

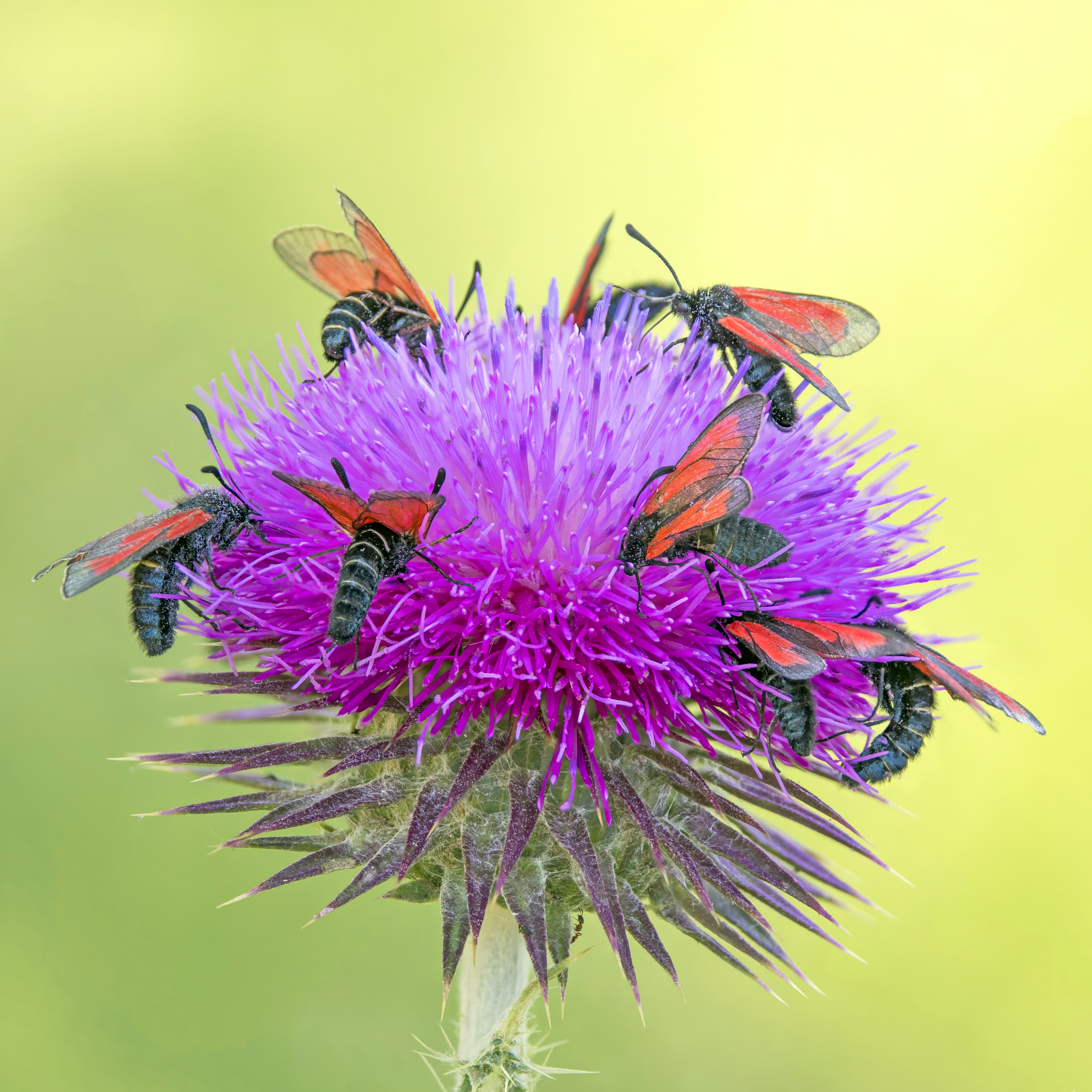
on a thistle in Turkey

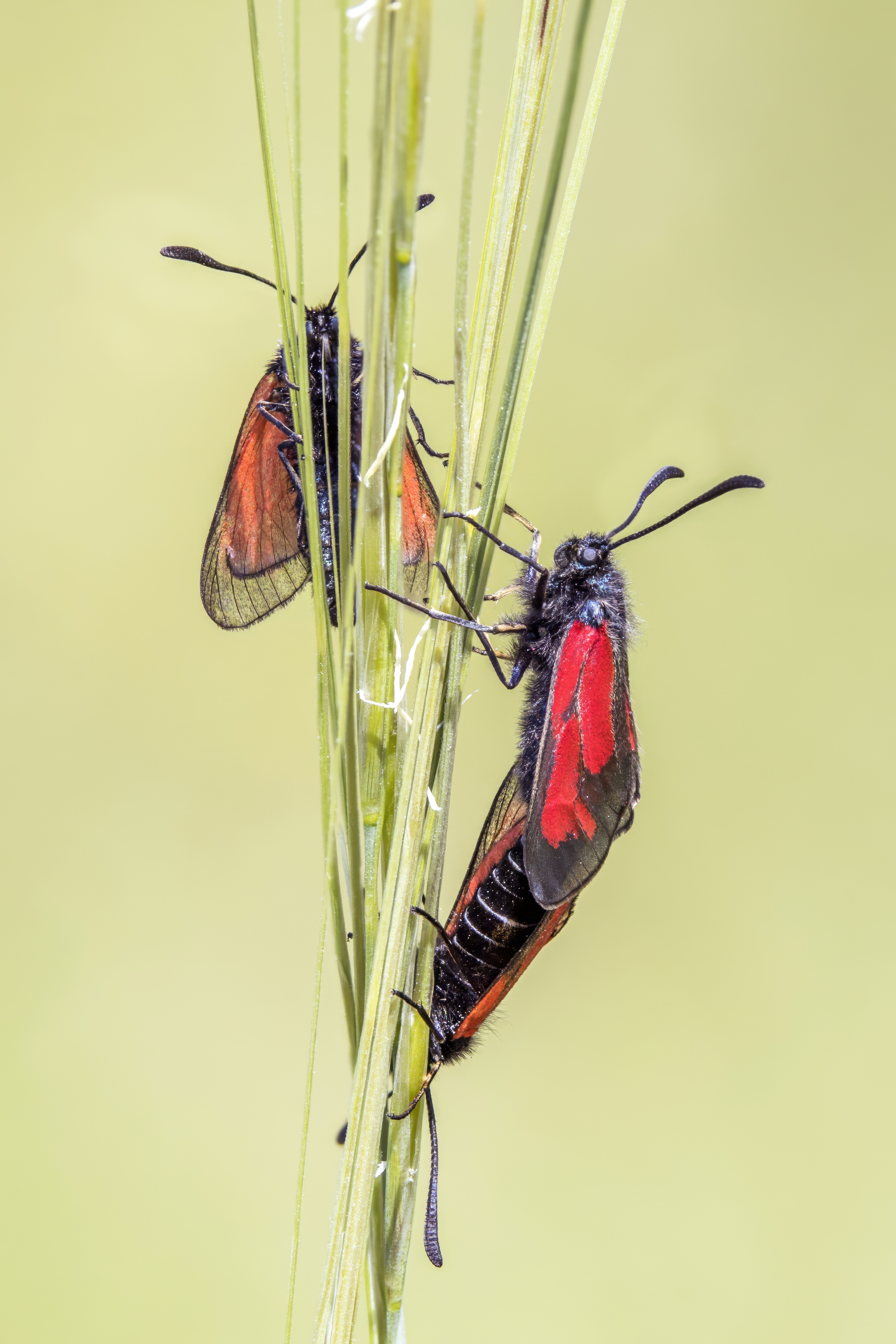
mating

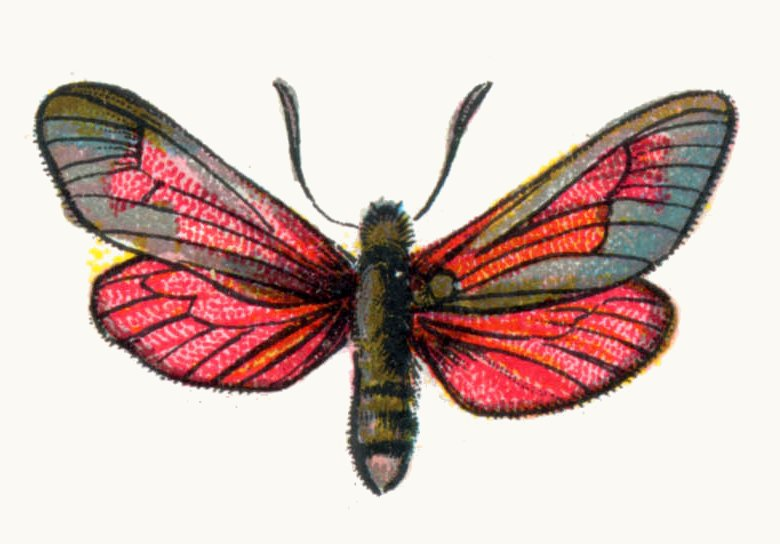
Zygaena purpuralis. Illustration from Europas bekannteste Schmetterlinge, Plate IX (c. 1895)

== Technical description and variation (Seitz) ==
Z. purpuralis Brunnich (= pilosellae Esp.; minos Fuessl.). In this species the hindmargin of the forewing (base included) is all black, while the red wedge-spots situated before it may be shaped entirely as in erythrus Hbn. An aberration with light yellow instead of red markings, already recorded by Ochsenheimer, has more lately been named by Ruhl ab. grossmanni (= lutescens Tutt). It is said to have been observed as a constant or at least prevalent form in certain very limited localities. In ab. obscura Tutt the entire wings, inclusive of the red colour, is darkened. — sareptensis Stgr.-Reb. [ now Zygaena minos ssp. sareptensis Rebel, 1901 ] is a large, somewhat paler, lighter red form from South Russia. — diaphana Stgr.[now Zygaena minos ssp. diaphana Staudinger, 1887 ], from Tauria, has thinly scaled, strongly transparent wings, the central wedge-spot being distally strongly widened. — nubigena Led. [ subspecies ] is also a very thinly scaled form from the high mountains of Europe and Asia, having moreover (like many mountain-forms) a very shaggy body, like Zygaena exulans, with which it occurs occasionally together. — In the rather large form smirnovi Christ.[ now Zygaena minos ssp. smirnovi Christoph, 1884 ], from Turkestan, the distal wedge-spot is constricted before its dilated apex. — pluto O. (= pythia Hbn.) [synonym of Z.purpuralis] has a black apex to the hindwing and the central streak of forewing is entirely of even width, not in the least being dilated distally; in South Europe, as far north as Austria. — In polygalae Esp. [now Zygaena filipendulae ssp. polygalae Esper, 1783 ] the black interspaces between the red streaks have entirely disappeared the red being so extended (especially in females) that the forewing is only edged with black, differing from Zygaena rubicundus in the hindmargin of forewing being black (though sometimes only narrowly); in the South, especially Northern Italy. — In heringi Zell.[ synonym of purpuralis ], from North Germany, the antenna is thinner and the central wedge-spot of the somewhat broader forewing extends to near the distal edge. — In ab. interrupta Stgr. [synonym for Zygaena minos ssp. pimpinellae ] the central streak is broadly interrupted and the posterior one often constricted in middle; more in the North of the area, among the name-typical form. — If all three streaks are interrupted, the red is separated into 6 spots, recalling the pattern of other Zygaenas; this form is ab. sexmaculata Burgeff. — Finally, there occur also specimens which have a red abdominal belt: ab. cingulata Burgeff — Larva bluish white or light yellow; a subdorsal row of heavy black dots; head, pectoral legs and stigmata black.

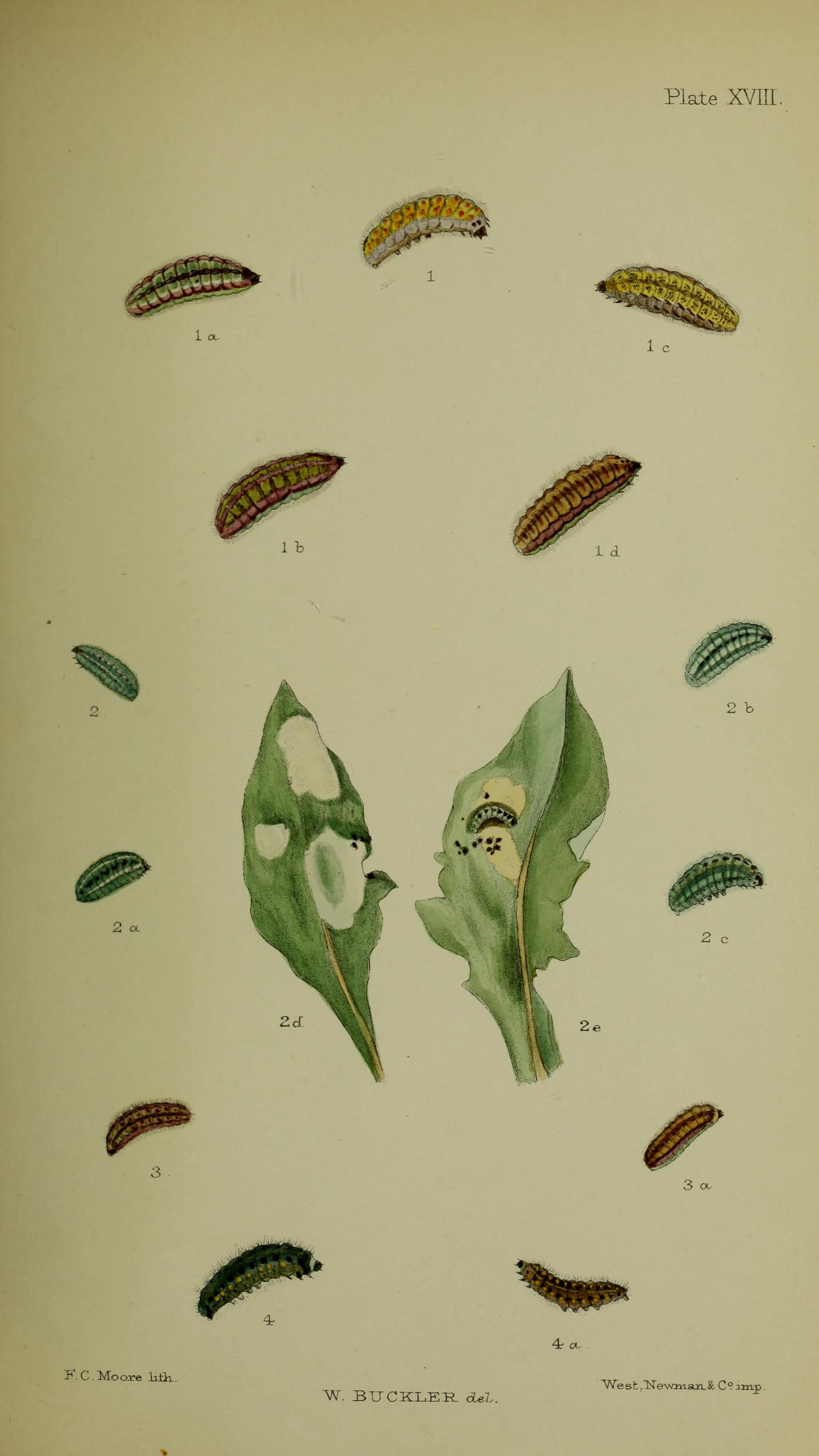
Figs. Figs. 4a Anthrocera minos var. nubigena = Zygaena purpuralis (Brünnich, 1763) larvae before last moult 4 larvae after last moult

== Biology ==
Adult moths are on wing from late May until August, depending on location. They fly during the day, especially with warm and sunny weather, feeding on nectar of various flowers. The larvae feed on wild thyme (Thymus polytrichus, Thymus serpyllum, etc.). They occur from August to May and overwinter once or twice.

== Distribution ==
This species can be is found in most of western, central and southern Europe, from Ireland to France through to Asia Minor, the Caucasus, Russia and across the Palearctic to the Altai Mountains.

== Habitat ==
Zygaena purpuralis prefers sunny and grassy slopes, under cliffs and dry grassland.

== Subspecies ==
There are several distinct sub-species:

- Zygaena purpuralis purpuralis
- Zygaena purpuralis austronubigena Verity 1946
- Zygaena purpuralis caledonensis Reiss, 1931 (Hebridean islands of Skye, Lismore, Kerrera, Mull, Ulva, Eigg, Canna, and Rùm and in a few localities on the Scottish mainland in Kintyre and parts of western Argyllshire)
- Zygaena purpuralis dojranica Burgeff, 1926
- Zygaena purpuralis fiorii Costantini, 1916
- Zygaena purpuralis isarca Verity, 1922
- Zygaena purpuralis lathyri Boisduval, 1828
- Zygaena purpuralis magnalpina Verity, 1922
- Zygaena purpuralis mirabilis Verity, 1922
- Zygaena purpuralis nubigena Lederer, 1853
- Zygaena purpuralis sabulosa Tremewan, 1976 (western Ireland in the Burren, Counties Galway and Mayo and on Inishmore, in the Aran Islands)
- Zygaena purpuralis segontii Tremewan, 1958 (occurred on sea-cliffs of the Llŷn Peninsula, Caernarvonshire. It has not been reported since 1962 and might be extinct)

== Bibliography ==
- Šašić, Martina; Nahirnić, Ana; Tarmann, Gerhard M. (2016-12-31). "Zygaenidae (Lepidoptera) in the Lepidoptera collections of the Croatian Natural History Museum". Natura Croatica: Periodicum Musei Historiae Naturalis Croatici. 25 (2): 233–248. doi:10.20302/NC.2016.25.19. eISSN 1848-7386.
