= List of Lepidoptera of the Azores =

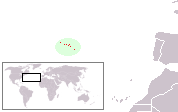
Location of Azores

An estimated 150 species of Lepidoptera, the order comprising butterflies and moths, have been recorded in the North Atlantic archipelago of the Azores.

== Butterflies ==
=== Lycaenidae ===
- Lampides boeticus (Linnaeus, 1767)

=== Nymphalidae ===
- Danaus plexippus (Linnaeus, 1758)
- Hipparchia azorina (Strecker, 1898)
- Vanessa atalanta (Linnaeus, 1758)
- Vanessa cardui (Linnaeus, 1758)

=== Pieridae ===
- Colias croceus (Fourcroy, 1785)
- Pieris brassicae (Linnaeus, 1758)

== Moths ==
=== Argyresthiidae ===
- Argyresthia atlanticella Rebel, 1940
- Argyresthia minusculella Rebel, 1940

=== Autostichidae ===
- Oegoconia novimundi (Busck, 1915)

=== Bedelliidae ===
- Bedellia somnulentella (Zeller, 1847)

=== Blastobasidae ===
- Blastobasis desertarum (Wollaston, 1858)
- Blastobasis maroccanella Amsel, 1952

=== Choreutidae ===
- Tebenna micalis (Mann, 1857)

=== Coleophoridae ===
- Coleophora versurella Zeller, 1849

=== Cosmopterigidae ===
- Cosmopterix pulchrimella Chambers, 1875
- Pyroderces argyrogrammos (Zeller, 1847)

=== Crambidae ===
- Diasemiopsis ramburialis (Duponchel, 1834)
- Euchromius ocellea (Haworth, 1811)
- Eudonia interlinealis (Warren, 1905)
- Eudonia luteusalis (Hampson, 1907)
- Eudonia melanographa (Hampson, 1907)
- Herpetogramma licarsisalis (Walker, 1859)
- Mecyna asinalis (Hübner, 1819)
- Nomophila noctuella (Denis & Schiffermuller, 1775)
- Palpita vitrealis (Rossi, 1794)
- Scoparia aequipennalis Warren, 1905
- Scoparia carvalhoi Nuss, Karsholt & Meyer, 1998
- Scoparia coecimaculalis Warren, 1905
- Scoparia semiamplalis Warren, 1905
- Spoladea recurvalis (Fabricius, 1775)
- Udea azorensis Meyer, Nuss & Speidel, 1997
- Udea ferrugalis (Hübner, 1796)

=== Epermeniidae ===
- Epermenia aequidentellus (E. Hofmann, 1867)

=== Erebidae ===
- Eublemma ostrina (Hübner, 1808)
- Hypena lividalis (Hübner, 1796)
- Hypena obsitalis (Hübner, 1813)
- Ophiusa tirhaca (Cramer, 1773)
- Schrankia costaestrigalis (Stephens, 1834)
- Tathorhynchus exsiccata (Lederer, 1855)
- Utetheisa pulchella (Linnaeus, 1758)

=== Gelechiidae ===
- Aproaerema anthyllidella (Hübner, 1813)
- Brachmia infuscatella Rebel, 1940
- Chrysoesthia sexguttella (Thunberg, 1794)
- Phthorimaea operculella (Zeller, 1873)
- Platyedra subcinerea (Haworth, 1828)
- Sitotroga cerealella (Olivier, 1789)

=== Geometridae ===
- Ascotis fortunata (Blachier, 1887)
- Costaconvexa centrostrigaria (Wollaston, 1858)
- Cyclophora azorensis (Prout, 1920)
- Cyclophora puppillaria (Hübner, 1799)
- Eupithecia ogilviata (Warren, 1905)
- Gymnoscelis rufifasciata (Haworth, 1809)
- Nycterosea obstipata (Fabricius, 1794)
- Rhodometra sacraria (Linnaeus, 1767)
- Xanthorhoe inaequata Warren, 1905

=== Glyphipterigidae ===
- Glyphipterix diaphora Walsingham, 1894

=== Gracillariidae ===
- Caloptilia coruscans (Walsingham, 1907)
- Dialectica scalariella (Zeller, 1850)
- Micrurapteryx bistrigella (Rebel, 1940)
- Phyllocnistis citrella Stainton, 1856
- Phyllonorycter messaniella (Zeller, 1846)

=== Nepticulidae ===
- Stigmella aurella (Fabricius, 1775)

=== Noctuidae ===
- Agrotis ipsilon (Hufnagel, 1766)
- Agrotis segetum (Denis & Schiffermuller, 1775)
- Anarta trifolii (Hufnagel, 1766)
- Autographa gamma (Linnaeus, 1758)
- Chrysodeixis chalcites (Esper, 1789)
- Ctenoplusia limbirena (Guenee, 1852)
- Euplexia lucipara (Linnaeus, 1758)
- Galgula partita Guenee, 1852
- Hadena azorica Meyer & Fibiger, 2002
- Helicoverpa armigera (Hübner, 1808)
- Leucania loreyi (Duponchel, 1827)
- Melanchra granti Warren, 1905
- Mesapamea storai (Rebel, 1940)
- Mythimna unipuncta (Haworth, 1809)
- Noctua atlantica (Warren, 1905)
- Noctua carvalhoi (Pinker, 1983)
- Noctua pronuba (Linnaeus, 1758)
- Paranataelia whitei (Rebel, 1906)
- Peridroma saucia (Hübner, 1808)
- Phlogophora cabrali Pinker, 1971
- Phlogophora furnasi Pinker, 1971
- Phlogophora interrupta (Warren, 1905)
- Phlogophora kruegeri Saldaitis & Ivinskis, 2006
- Phlogophora meticulosa (Linnaeus, 1758)
- Sesamia nonagrioides Lefebvre, 1827
- Spodoptera exigua (Hübner, 1808)
- Spodoptera littoralis (Boisduval, 1833)
- Thysanoplusia orichalcea (Fabricius, 1775)
- Trichoplusia ni (Hübner, 1803)
- Xestia c-nigrum (Linnaeus, 1758)

=== Plutellidae ===
- Plutella xylostella (Linnaeus, 1758)

=== Praydidae ===
- Prays citri (Milliere, 1873)
- Prays oleae (Bernard, 1788)
- Luffia ferchaultella (Stephens, 1850)

=== Pterophoridae ===
- Amblyptilia acanthadactyla (Hübner, 1813)
- Emmelina monodactyla (Linnaeus, 1758)
- Lantanophaga pusillidactylus (Walker, 1864)
- Stenoptilia meyeri Gielis, 1997
- Stenoptilia zophodactylus (Duponchel, 1840)

=== Pyralidae ===
- Aglossa caprealis (Hübner, 1809)
- Apomyelois ceratoniae (Zeller, 1839)
- Cadra cautella (Walker, 1863)
- Corcyra cephalonica (Stainton, 1866)
- Cryptoblabes gnidiella (Milliere, 1867)
- Ephestia elutella (Hübner, 1796)
- Ephestia kuehniella Zeller, 1879
- Galleria mellonella (Linnaeus, 1758)
- Homoeosoma miguelensis Meyer, Nuss & Speidel, 1997
- Homoeosoma picoensis Meyer, Nuss & Speidel, 1997
- Phycitodes albatella (Ragonot, 1887)
- Plodia interpunctella (Hübner, 1813)
- Pyralis farinalis (Linnaeus, 1758)

=== Sphingidae ===
- Acherontia atropos (Linnaeus, 1758)
- Agrius convolvuli (Linnaeus, 1758)
- Hippotion celerio (Linnaeus, 1758)
- Macroglossum stellatarum (Linnaeus, 1758)

=== Stathmopodidae ===
- Neomariania incertella (Rebel, 1940)
- Neomariania oecophorella (Rebel, 1940)
- Neomariania scriptella (Rebel, 1940)

=== Tineidae ===
- Eudarcia atlantica Henderickx, 1995
- Monopis crocicapitella (Clemens, 1859)
- Niditinea fuscella (Linnaeus, 1758)
- Oinophila v-flava (Haworth, 1828)
- Opogona omoscopa (Meyrick, 1893)
- Opogona sacchari (Bojer, 1856)
- Praeacedes atomosella (Walker, 1863)
- Tenaga nigripunctella (Haworth, 1828)
- Tinea murariella Staudinger, 1859
- Tinea poecilella Rebel, 1940
- Trichophaga bipartitella (Ragonot, 1892)
- Trichophaga tapetzella (Linnaeus, 1758)

=== Tortricidae ===
- Acleris schalleriana (Linnaeus, 1761)
- Acleris variegana (Denis & Schiffermuller, 1775)
- Bactra lancealana (Hübner, 1799)
- Bactra venosana (Zeller, 1847)
- Clavigesta sylvestrana (Curtis, 1850)
- Crocidosema plebejana Zeller, 1847
- Cydia pomonella (Linnaeus, 1758)
- Cydia splendana (Hübner, 1799)
- Endothenia oblongana (Haworth, 1811)
- Epiphyas postvittana (Walker, 1863)
- Grapholita molesta (Busck, 1916)
- Pandemis heparana (Denis & Schiffermuller, 1775)
- Rhopobota naevana (Hübner, 1817)
- Selania leplastriana (Curtis, 1831)
