= Pellitory =

Pellitory may refer to:

- Anacyclus pyrethrum or pellitory, a plant containing an oil once used for toothaches and facial neuralgia
- Achillea ptarmica or European pellitory, bastard pellitory, or wild pellitory
- Parietaria debilis
- Parietaria officinalis or eastern pellitory-of-the-wall
- Parietaria judaica or spreading pellitory, or pellitory-of-the-wall
- Parietaria pensylvanica or Pennsylvania pellitory
- Dalmatian pellitory, a pyrethrum plant of the genus Chrysanthemum
