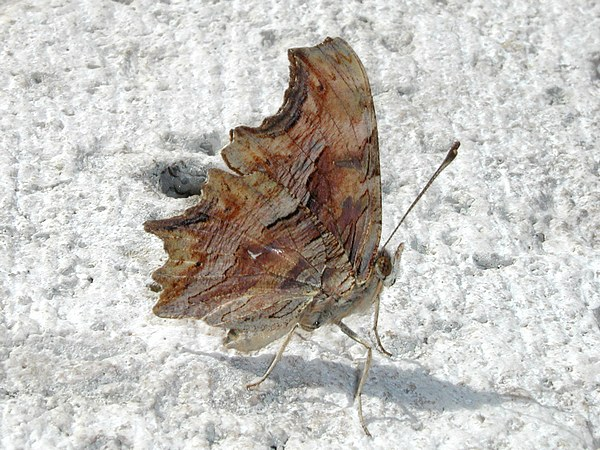

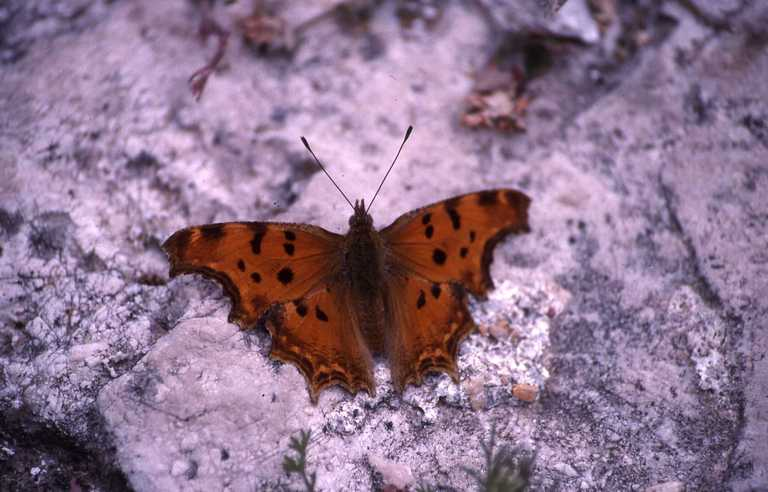

Scientific classification
- Domain: Eukaryota
- Kingdom: Animalia
- Phylum: Arthropoda
- Class: Insecta
- Order: Lepidoptera
- Family: Nymphalidae
- Genus: Polygonia
- Species: P. egea

Binomial name
- Polygonia egea (Cramer, 1775)

Synonyms
- Nymphalis egea

= Polygonia egea =

Southern comma

Species of butterfly

Polygonia egea, the southern comma, is a butterfly of the family Nymphalidae. It is found in southern Europe.

The butterfly flies from March to September depending on the location.

The larvae feed on Parietaria officinalis in Europe.In the Transcaucasus on Parietaria judaica and in Turkey Parietaria and Urtica.

== Description in Seitz ==
P. egea Cr. (= triangulum F., i album Esp., female = vau album Esp.) (64c). A species similar to c-album with the wings more strongly dentate and narrower, and the underside more thinly marmorated and pencilled, the hindwing beneath bearing in the centre a white angle-, hook- or J-mark. The female flying at the same season as the nymotypical has the wings less sharply dentate, is paler, less prominently and more sparsely marked. Ab. autumnalis Curo (? Stefan, i. 1.) (64c as j-album) is the autumn-form, which has the wings more strongly angulate and of a darker ground-colour. The spots are very prominent, the distal margin of both wings is darkened, the light submarginal spots of the hindwing are very distinct, though small and isolated, and the underside is darkened. — The larva of the species feeds on Picrataria diffusa Keh. (Urticaceae) in July and October; as food-plants are also mentioned Ulmus, Urtica, Ribes, Lonicera, Corylus (Spuler). It is blackish or slaty grey, with yellow and black belts, the body bearing minute white hairs and dark branched spines; on the back there are pairs of large bluish black spots on a pale ground; the spirales are edged with yellowish, beneath them there being a reddish yellow line; the head heart-shape with 2 spine-like processes.

Pupa grey-brown, tuberculate above, without metallic spots, the head not produced.
