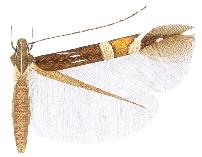

Scientific classification
- Kingdom: Animalia
- Phylum: Arthropoda
- Clade: Pancrustacea
- Class: Insecta
- Order: Lepidoptera
- Family: Cosmopterigidae
- Genus: Cosmopterix
- Species: C. pulchrimella

Binomial name
- Cosmopterix pulchrimella Chambers, 1875

Synonyms
- Cosmopteryx parietariae Hering, 1931; Cosmopterix parietariae

= Cosmopterix pulchrimella =

Species of moth

Cosmopterix pulchrimella, the beautiful cosmopterix moth, is a moth of the family Cosmopterigidae. It is known from the United States (from Massachusetts, Michigan, and southern Wyoming south to southern Florida, southern Arizona, and New Mexico) and Canada. It is also present in the Palearctic realm, where it is known from the Mediterranean Basin, from Portugal to the western Transcaucasus, north to Switzerland and Hungary. It has also been recorded from the Azores, the Canary Islands and Madeira. It has recently been found in southern England.

== Description ==
=== Adult ===
Male, female. Forewing length 3.0-4.0 mm. Head: frons shining grey, shining white towards clypeus, vertex and neck tufts shining dark brown, laterally and medially lined white, collar shining dark brown; labial palpus first segment very short, white, second segment four-fifths of the length of third, shining white on inside, dark brown with a white longitudinal line on outside, third segment white, lined brown laterally; scape dorsally shining dark brown with a white anterior line, ventrally shining white, antenna shining dark brown with a white interrupted line from base to beyond one-half, near base often uninterrupted, followed towards apex by five dark brown segments, one white, one dark brown, one white, three dark brown, one white, approximately twelve dark brown, three white and five dark brown segments at apex. Thorax and tegulae shining dark brown, thorax with a white median line. Legs: shining dark brown, foreleg with a white line on tibia and tarsal segment one, tibia of midleg with white oblique basal and medial lines and a white apical ring, tarsal segments one and two with white apical rings, segment five entirely white, tibia of hindleg as midleg, tarsal segments four and five entirely white, spurs white dorsally, brown ventrally. Forewing shining dark brown, three short silver streaks in the basal area, sometimes with a pale golden gloss, a subcostal nearest to base and bending from costa distally, a shorter medial underneath the distal end of the subcostal, a subdorsal, as long as the subcostal but further from base, a bright orange transverse fascia beyond the middle, narrowing towards dorsum, in some of the specimens from the USA the fascia is partly or completely darkened, bordered at the inner edge by broad tubercular pale golden metallic fascia, sometimes with a pinkish gloss, perpendicular at dorsum, edged blackish on the outside, bordered at the outer edge by a similarly coloured inwardly oblique fascia, edged blackish on the inside, at the costa of the outer fascia a broad white costal streak, the apical line as a silver metallic spot with bluish reflection in the middle of the apical area and a broad white spot in the cilia at apex, cilia dark brown. Hindwing shining brown, cilia brown. Underside: forewing shining dark greyish brown, the white costal streak and apical spot distinctly visible, hindwing shining dark greyish brown. Abdomen shining dark brown dorsally, ventrally segments banded white posteriorly, anal tuft brown.

=== Larva ===
Head and prothoracic plate black, anal plate greyish brown, thoracic legs pale brown, body greyish white.

== Biology ==
The larvae feed on Parietaria judaica, Parietaria officinalis, Parietaria pensylvanica and Pilea pumila. They mine the leaves of their host plant. The mines starts as an irregular gallery usually at the midrib, soon leading to an irregular blotch. Inside the mine a silken spinning is found, which often causes contortion of the leaf. The larva constructs a silk-lined gallery, which serves as a shelter when the larva is not feeding. The frass is partly inside the mine, but most of it is rejected through a hole at the beginning of the mine. The black pellets of frass on the underside of a leaf indicate the presence of a larva. New mines are made very often. The cocoon is found inside the mine. The species is bivoltine, with adults on wing throughout the year in southern areas.
