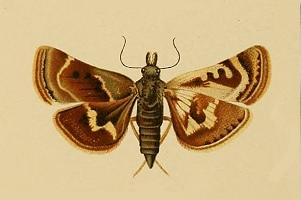

Scientific classification
- Domain: Eukaryota
- Kingdom: Animalia
- Phylum: Arthropoda
- Class: Insecta
- Order: Lepidoptera
- Family: Crambidae
- Genus: Pyrausta
- Species: P. amatalis

Binomial name
- Pyrausta amatalis Rebel, 1903

= Pyrausta amatalis =

Species of moth

Pyrausta amatalis is a species of moth in the family Crambidae. It is found in Bulgaria and Turkey.

The wingspan is 15–16 mm.
