= Ethmia pseudoscythrella =

Scientific classification
- Domain: Eukaryota
- Kingdom: Animalia
- Phylum: Arthropoda
- Class: Insecta
- Order: Lepidoptera
- Family: Depressariidae
- Genus: Ethmia
- Species: E. pseudoscythrella

Binomial name
- Ethmia pseudoscythrella (Rebel, 1902)

Synonyms
- Psecadia pseudoscythrella Rebel, 1902

Species of moth

Ethmia pseudoscythrella is a moth in the family Depressariidae. It was described by Rebel in 1902. It is found in Asia Minor.

The wingspan is about 14 mm (0.55 in). The forewings are olive brown with some white scales and marks. The hindwings are blackish-grey
