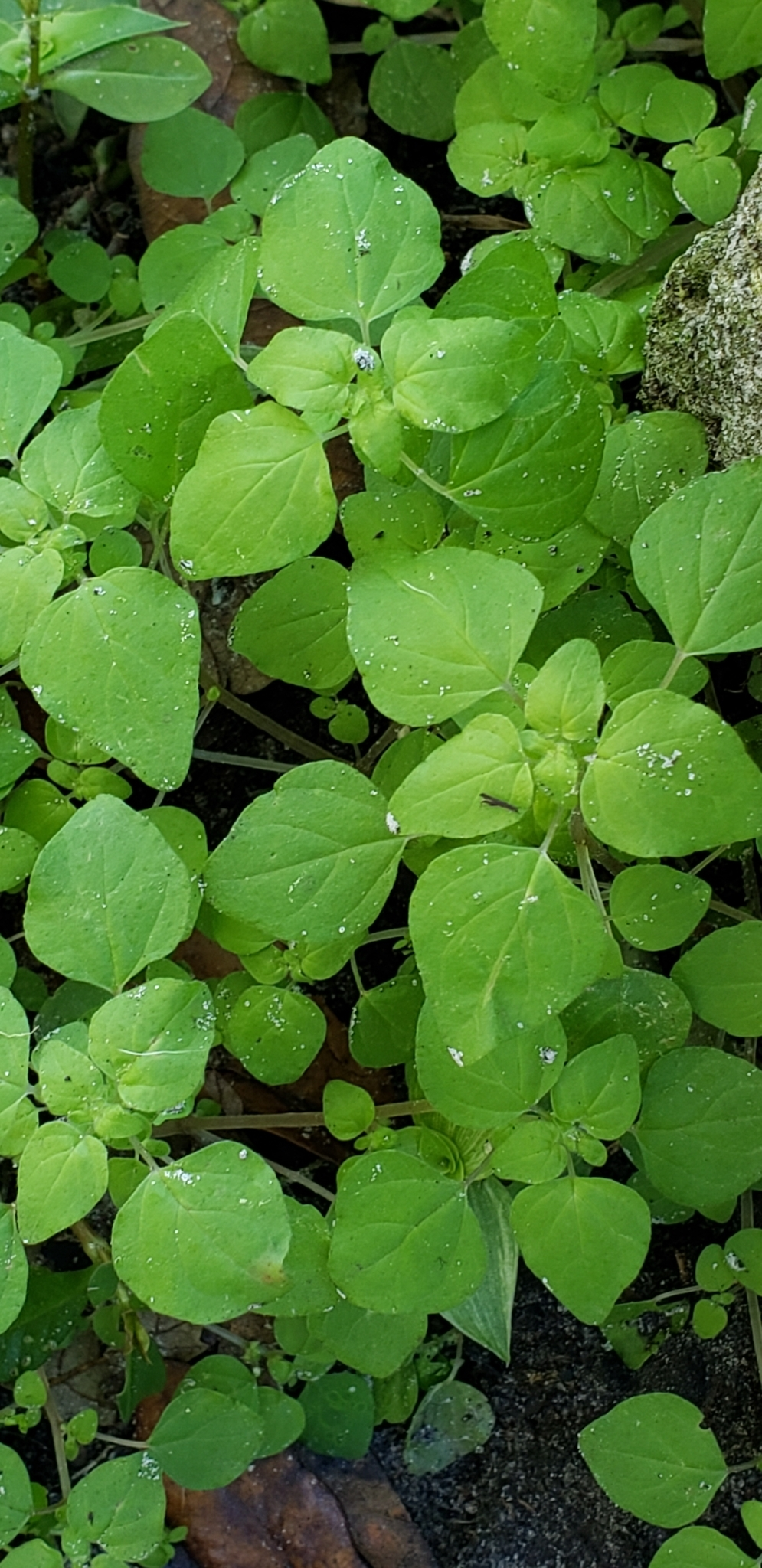

Conservation status
- Least Concern (IUCN 3.1)

Scientific classification
- Kingdom: Plantae
- Clade: Tracheophytes
- Clade: Angiosperms
- Clade: Eudicots
- Clade: Rosids
- Order: Rosales
- Family: Urticaceae
- Genus: Parietaria
- Species: P. floridana

Binomial name
- Parietaria floridana Nutt.

Synonyms
- Parietaria debilis var. floridana (Nutt.) Wedd.; Parietaria nummularia Small

= Parietaria floridana =

Species of flowering plant

Parietaria floridana, commonly known as Florida pellitory, is a plant species in the family Urticaceae. It is native to the southeastern United States, the West Indies, and much of Latin America. In the United States, the heart of its range extends from Florida, to Georgia and North and South Carolina, with isolated populations reported in Mississippi, Louisiana, Texas, New Hampshire, Kentucky and Delaware. Some populations in California have in the past been referred to as P. floridana but are now regarded as a separate species, P. hespera.

Parietaria floridana is an annual or short-lived perennial, branched herb growing up to 40 cm tall, sometimes running along the ground. Leaves are up to 3 cm long. Flowers are up to 4 mm across. Achenes are less than 0.9 mm long.
