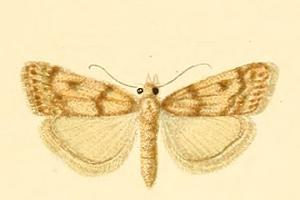

Scientific classification
- Kingdom: Animalia
- Phylum: Arthropoda
- Class: Insecta
- Order: Lepidoptera
- Family: Crambidae
- Genus: Scoparia
- Species: S. dicteella

Binomial name
- Scoparia dicteella Rebel, 1916

= Scoparia dicteella =

Species of moth

Scoparia dicteella is a species of moth in the family Crambidae. It is found in mainland Greece and on Crete.

The wingspan is about 23 mm.
