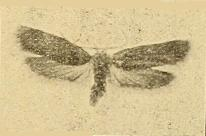

Scientific classification
- Domain: Eukaryota
- Kingdom: Animalia
- Phylum: Arthropoda
- Class: Insecta
- Order: Lepidoptera
- Family: Depressariidae
- Genus: Ethmia
- Species: E. rothschildi

Binomial name
- Ethmia rothschildi (Rebel, 1912)

Synonyms
- Psecadia rothschildi Rebel, 1912

= Ethmia rothschildi =

Species of moth

Ethmia rothschildi is a moth in the family Depressariidae. It is found in Romania and Russia.
