= Scopula rhodinaria =

Scientific classification
- Kingdom: Animalia
- Phylum: Arthropoda
- Class: Insecta
- Order: Lepidoptera
- Family: Geometridae
- Genus: Scopula
- Species: S. rhodinaria

Binomial name
- Scopula rhodinaria (Rebel, 1907)

Synonyms
- Acidalia rhodinaria Rebel, 1907

Species of geometer moth in subfamily Sterrhinae

Scopula rhodinaria is a moth of the family Geometridae. It is found on Socotra, Yemen.
