= Neomariania partinicensis =

Scientific classification
- Domain: Eukaryota
- Kingdom: Animalia
- Phylum: Arthropoda
- Class: Insecta
- Order: Lepidoptera
- Family: Oecophoridae
- Genus: Neomariania
- Species: N. partinicensis

Binomial name
- Neomariania partinicensis (Rebel, 1937)

Synonyms
- Mariania partinicensis Rebel, 1937

Species of moth

Neomariania partinicensis is a species of moth of the Stathmopodidae family. It is found in the Mediterranean area.

Their wingspan is 10–12 mm. Adults have been collected from the end of June to mid-September.
