= Ceroprepes fartakensis =

Scientific classification
- Domain: Eukaryota
- Kingdom: Animalia
- Phylum: Arthropoda
- Class: Insecta
- Order: Lepidoptera
- Family: Pyralidae
- Genus: Ceroprepes
- Species: C. fartakensis

Binomial name
- Ceroprepes fartakensis (Rebel, 1931)

Synonyms
- Anadelosemia fartakensis Rebel, 1931

Species of moth

Ceroprepes fartakensis is a species of snout moth in the genus Ceroprepes. It was described by Hans Rebel in 1931, and is known from Arabia.
