= Dichomeris bodenheimeri =

Scientific classification
- Domain: Eukaryota
- Kingdom: Animalia
- Phylum: Arthropoda
- Class: Insecta
- Order: Lepidoptera
- Family: Gelechiidae
- Genus: Dichomeris
- Species: D. bodenheimeri

Binomial name
- Dichomeris bodenheimeri (Rebel, 1926)

Synonyms
- Rhinosia bodenheimeri Rebel, 1926

Species of moth

Dichomeris bodenheimeri is a moth in the family Gelechiidae. It was described by Hans Rebel in 1926. It is found in Palestine, Jordan and Yemen.

The larvae feed on Prosopis stephaniana.
