= Lecithocera pauperella =

Scientific classification
- Kingdom: Animalia
- Phylum: Arthropoda
- Class: Insecta
- Order: Lepidoptera
- Family: Lecithoceridae
- Genus: Lecithocera
- Species: L. pauperella

Binomial name
- Lecithocera pauperella Rebel, 1917

Species of moth in genus Lecithocera

Lecithocera pauperella is a moth in the family Lecithoceridae. It was described by Hans Rebel in 1917. It is found in Egypt and Sudan.

The wingspan is about 9.5 mm. The forewings are brownish-grey without markings. The hindwings are light grey.
