= Ethmia tamaridella =

Scientific classification
- Domain: Eukaryota
- Kingdom: Animalia
- Phylum: Arthropoda
- Class: Insecta
- Order: Lepidoptera
- Family: Depressariidae
- Genus: Ethmia
- Species: E. tamaridella

Binomial name
- Ethmia tamaridella (Rebel, 1907)

Synonyms
- Psecadia tamaridella Rebel, 1907

Species of moth

Ethmia tamaridella is a moth in the family Depressariidae. It was described by Rebel in 1907. It is found in Yemen (Socotra).
