= Elachista laetella =

Scientific classification
- Domain: Eukaryota
- Kingdom: Animalia
- Phylum: Arthropoda
- Class: Insecta
- Order: Lepidoptera
- Family: Elachistidae
- Genus: Elachista
- Species: E. laetella

Binomial name
- Elachista laetella Rebel, 1930

Species of moth

Elachista laetella is a moth of the family Elachistidae that is endemic to Bulgaria.
