= P. pensylvanica =

P. pensylvanica may refer to:

- Parietaria pensylvanica, a flowering plant species native to much of North America
- Prunus pensylvanica, the pin cherry or fire cherry, a tree species

== See also ==
- Pensylvanica
