= Ceroprepes walterzeissi =

Scientific classification
- Domain: Eukaryota
- Kingdom: Animalia
- Phylum: Arthropoda
- Class: Insecta
- Order: Lepidoptera
- Family: Pyralidae
- Genus: Ceroprepes
- Species: C. walterzeissi

Binomial name
- Ceroprepes walterzeissi Roesler, 1983

Species of moth

Ceroprepes walterzeissi is a species of snout moth in the genus Ceroprepes. It was described by Roesler, in 1983, and is known from Sumatra, Indonesia.
