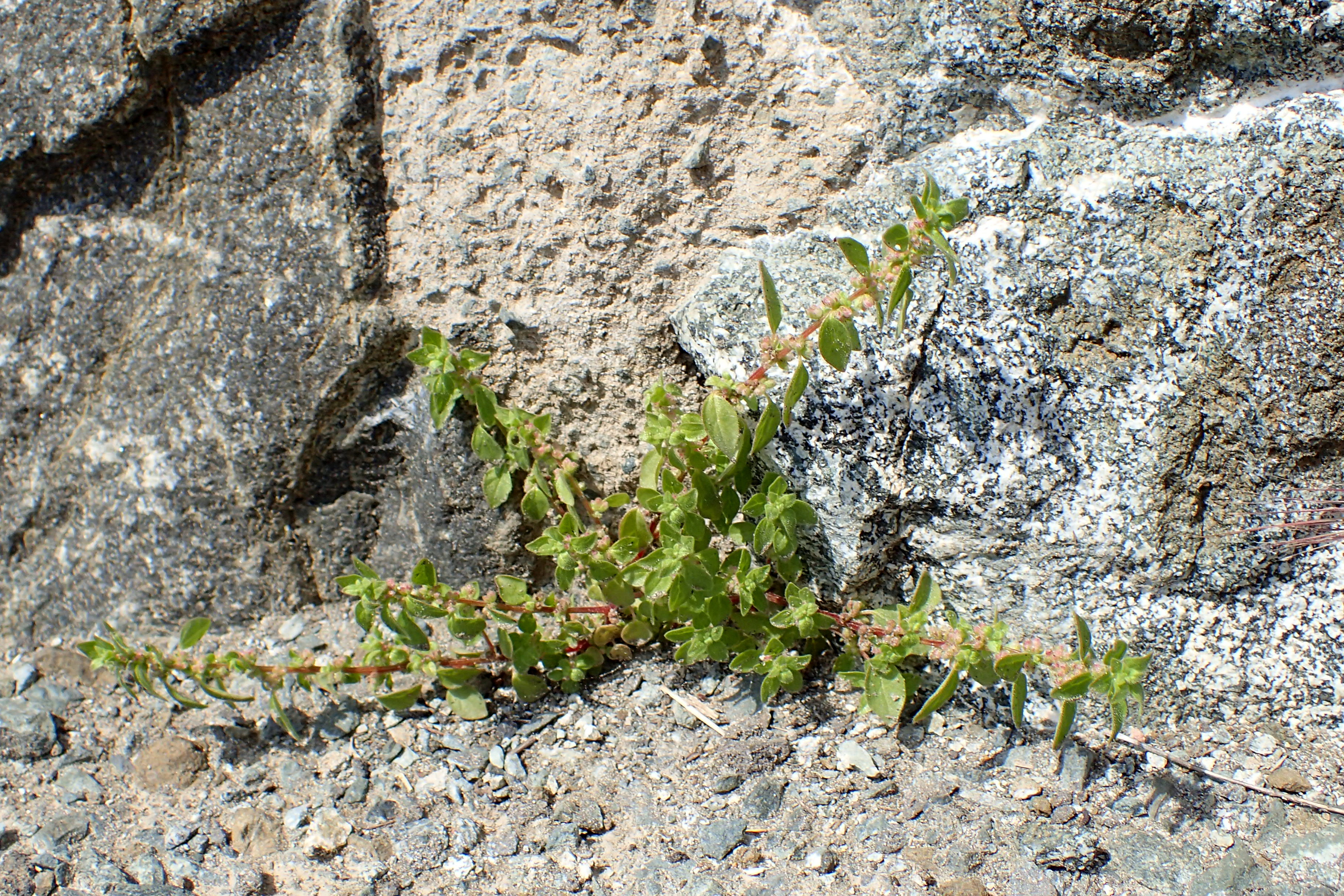

Scientific classification
- Kingdom: Plantae
- Clade: Tracheophytes
- Clade: Angiosperms
- Clade: Eudicots
- Clade: Rosids
- Order: Rosales
- Family: Urticaceae
- Genus: Parietaria
- Species: P. lusitanica

Binomial name
- Parietaria lusitanica L.

= Parietaria lusitanica =

Species of plant

Parietaria lusitanica is a species of plant in the family Urticaceae.

== Sources ==
This article incorporates text from a free content work. Licensed under CC0 (license statement/permission). Text taken from Parietaria lusitanica. Encyclopedia of Life.
