= Neomariania oecophorella =

Scientific classification
- Domain: Eukaryota
- Kingdom: Animalia
- Phylum: Arthropoda
- Class: Insecta
- Order: Lepidoptera
- Family: Oecophoridae
- Genus: Neomariania
- Species: N. oecophorella

Binomial name
- Neomariania oecophorella (Rebel, 1940)

Synonyms
- Megaceraea oecophorella Rebel, 1940

Species of moth

Neomariania oecophorella is a moth in the family Stathmopodidae. It was described by Hans Rebel in 1940. It is found on the Azores.
