= Argyresthia atlanticella =

Scientific classification
- Kingdom: Animalia
- Phylum: Arthropoda
- Clade: Pancrustacea
- Class: Insecta
- Order: Lepidoptera
- Family: Argyresthiidae
- Genus: Argyresthia
- Species: A. atlanticella

Binomial name
- Argyresthia atlanticella Rebel, 1940

Species of moth

Argyresthia atlanticella is a moth of the family Yponomeutidae. It is found on the Azores. They are on wing from July to August.

The larvae feed on Myrica faya, Erica scoparia azorica and Vaccinium cylindraceum. Larvae can be found from April to August.
