= Ceroprepes guizhouensis =

Scientific classification
- Domain: Eukaryota
- Kingdom: Animalia
- Phylum: Arthropoda
- Class: Insecta
- Order: Lepidoptera
- Family: Pyralidae
- Genus: Ceroprepes
- Species: C. guizhouensis

Binomial name
- Ceroprepes guizhouensis Du, Li & Wang in Du, Li & Wang, 2002

Species of moth

Ceroprepes guizhouensis is a species of snout moth in the genus Ceroprepes. It was described by Yan-Li Du, Hou-Hun Li and Shu-Xia Wang in 2002 and is known from China.
