= Neomariania rebeli =

Scientific classification
- Domain: Eukaryota
- Kingdom: Animalia
- Phylum: Arthropoda
- Class: Insecta
- Order: Lepidoptera
- Family: Oecophoridae
- Genus: Neomariania
- Species: N. rebeli

Binomial name
- Neomariania rebeli (Walsingham, 1894)

Synonyms
- Laverna rebeli Walsingham, 1894

Species of moth

Neomariania rebeli is a species of moth of the Stathmopodidae family. It is found in Portugal (including Madeira) and on the Canary Islands.

The wingspan is 8–14 mm. Adults have been collected from mid-July to mid-October.
