= Ceroprepes =

Scientific classification
- Domain: Eukaryota
- Kingdom: Animalia
- Phylum: Arthropoda
- Class: Insecta
- Order: Lepidoptera
- Family: Pyralidae
- Subfamily: Phycitinae
- Genus: Ceroprepes; Zeller, 1867

Genus of moths

Ceroprepes is a genus of snout moths. It was described by It was described by Zeller in 1867.

== Species ==
- Ceroprepes atribasilaris Du, Song & Yang, 2005
- Ceroprepes fartakensis (Rebel, 1931)
- Ceroprepes fusconebulella Yamanaka & Kirpichnikova, 2000
- Ceroprepes guizhouensis Du, Li & Wang in Du, Li & Wang, 2002
- Ceroprepes jilongensis Du, Song & Yang, 2005
- Ceroprepes lunata Du, Song & Yang, 2005
- Ceroprepes naga Roesler & Küppers, 1979
- Ceroprepes nigrolineatella Shibuya, 1927
- Ceroprepes ophthalmicella (Christoph, 1881)
- Ceroprepes patriciella Zeller, 1867
- Ceroprepes proximalis Walker, 1863
- Ceroprepes pulvillella (Zeller)
- Ceroprepes walterzeissi Roesler, 1983
