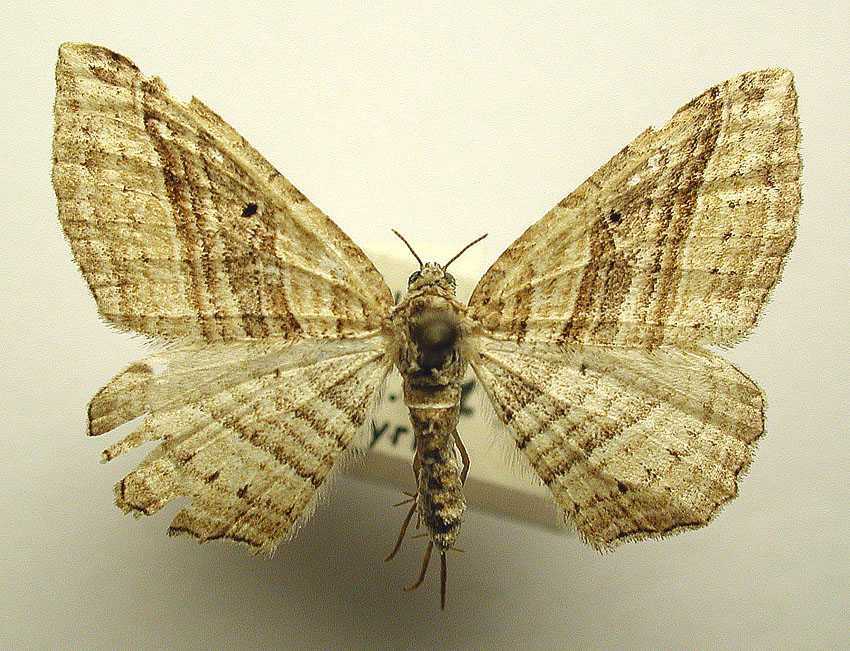

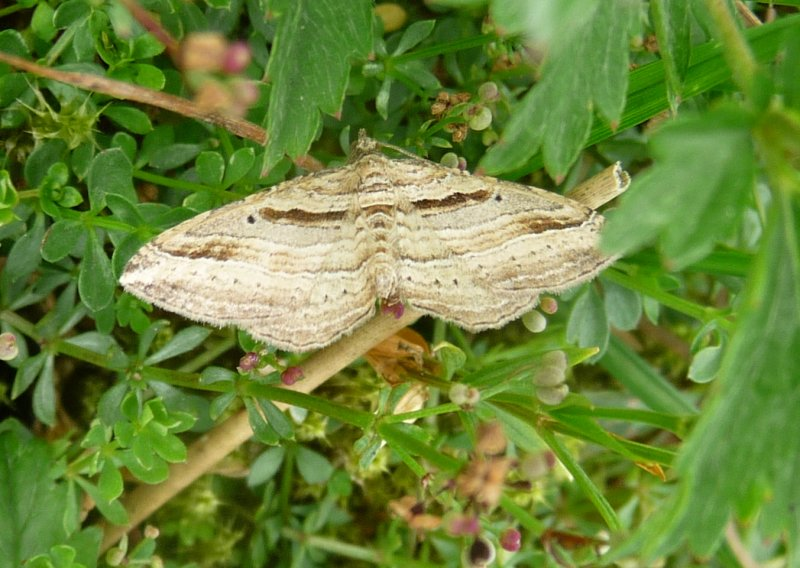

Scientific classification
- Domain: Eukaryota
- Kingdom: Animalia
- Phylum: Arthropoda
- Class: Insecta
- Order: Lepidoptera
- Family: Geometridae
- Genus: Costaconvexa
- Species: C. polygrammata

Binomial name
- Costaconvexa polygrammata (Borkhausen, 1794)

Synonyms
- Phalaena polygrammata Borkhausen, 1794

= Costaconvexa polygrammata =

Many-lined moth

Species of moth

Costaconvexa polygrammata, the many-lined moth, is a moth of the family Geometridae. The species was first described by Moritz Balthasar Borkhausen in 1794. It is found from Europe to North Africa.

The wingspan is about 26 mm. There are three generations per year with adults on wing from the end of March to April, in June and July and in August and September.

The larvae feed on Galium species, primarily G. saxatile. Larvae can be found from April to October. It overwinters as a pupa.
