= Ceroprepes naga =

Scientific classification
- Domain: Eukaryota
- Kingdom: Animalia
- Phylum: Arthropoda
- Class: Insecta
- Order: Lepidoptera
- Family: Pyralidae
- Genus: Ceroprepes
- Species: C. naga

Binomial name
- Ceroprepes naga Roesler & Küppers, 1979

Species of moth

Ceroprepes naga is a species of snout moth in the genus Ceroprepes. It was described by Roesler and Küppers, in 1979, and is known from Sumatra and Japan.
