= Ceroprepes fusconebulella =

Scientific classification
- Domain: Eukaryota
- Kingdom: Animalia
- Phylum: Arthropoda
- Class: Insecta
- Order: Lepidoptera
- Family: Pyralidae
- Genus: Ceroprepes
- Species: C. fusconebulella

Binomial name
- Ceroprepes fusconebulella Yamanaka & Kirpichnikova, 2000

Species of moth

Ceroprepes fusconebulella is a species of snout moth in the genus Ceroprepes. It was described by Hiroshi Yamanaka and Valentina A. Kirpichnikova in 2000 and is known from Russia.
