= Caloptilia bistrigella =

Scientific classification
- Domain: Eukaryota
- Kingdom: Animalia
- Phylum: Arthropoda
- Class: Insecta
- Order: Lepidoptera
- Family: Gracillariidae
- Genus: Caloptilia
- Species: C. bistrigella

Binomial name
- Caloptilia bistrigella (Rebel, 1940)

Synonyms
- Gracilaria bistrigella Rebel, 1940; Micrurapteryx bistrigella

Species of moth

Caloptilia bistrigella is a moth of the family Gracillariidae. It is known from Flores in the Azores.

The larvae feed on Myrica faya.
