= Ceroprepes proximalis =

Scientific classification
- Kingdom: Animalia
- Phylum: Arthropoda
- Class: Insecta
- Order: Lepidoptera
- Family: Pyralidae
- Genus: Ceroprepes
- Species: C. proximalis

Binomial name
- Ceroprepes proximalis (Walker, 1863)

Synonyms
- Nephopterix proximalis Walker, 1863

Species of moth

Ceroprepes proximalis is a moth of the family Pyralidae first described by Francis Walker in 1863. It is found in India, Sri Lanka, Thailand, western Malaysia, Borneo and Sulawesi.
