= Ceroprepes pulvillella =

Scientific classification
- Kingdom: Animalia
- Phylum: Arthropoda
- Clade: Pancrustacea
- Class: Insecta
- Order: Lepidoptera
- Family: Pyralidae
- Genus: Ceroprepes
- Species: C. pulvillella

Binomial name
- Ceroprepes pulvillella (Zeller, 1867)

Synonyms
- Nephopteryx pulvillella Zeller, 1867

Species of moth

Ceroprepes pulvillella is a species of snout moth in the genus Ceroprepes. It was described by Zeller in 1867 and is known from India.
