= Neomariania =

Scientific classification
- Kingdom: Animalia
- Phylum: Arthropoda
- Clade: Pancrustacea
- Class: Insecta
- Order: Lepidoptera
- Family: Oecophoridae
- Subfamily: Oecophorinae
- Genus: Neomariania; Mariani, 1943

Synonyms
- Mariania Rebel, 1937 (preocc.); Megaceraea Nye & D. S. Fletcher, 1991; Megaceraea Rebel, 1940

Genus of moths

Neomariania is a genus of moths in the family Stathmopodidae described by Mario Mariani in 1943, although it is sometimes included in the family Cosmopterigidae.

== Species ==
- Neomariania incertella (Rebel 1940) (from the Azores)
- Neomariania oecophorella (Rebel 1940) (from the Azores)
- Neomariania partinicensis (Rebel 1937) (from southern Europe)
- Neomariania rebeli (Rebel, 1937) (from Portugal, Madeira & Canary islands)
- Neomariania scriptella (Rebel, 1940) (from the Azores)
