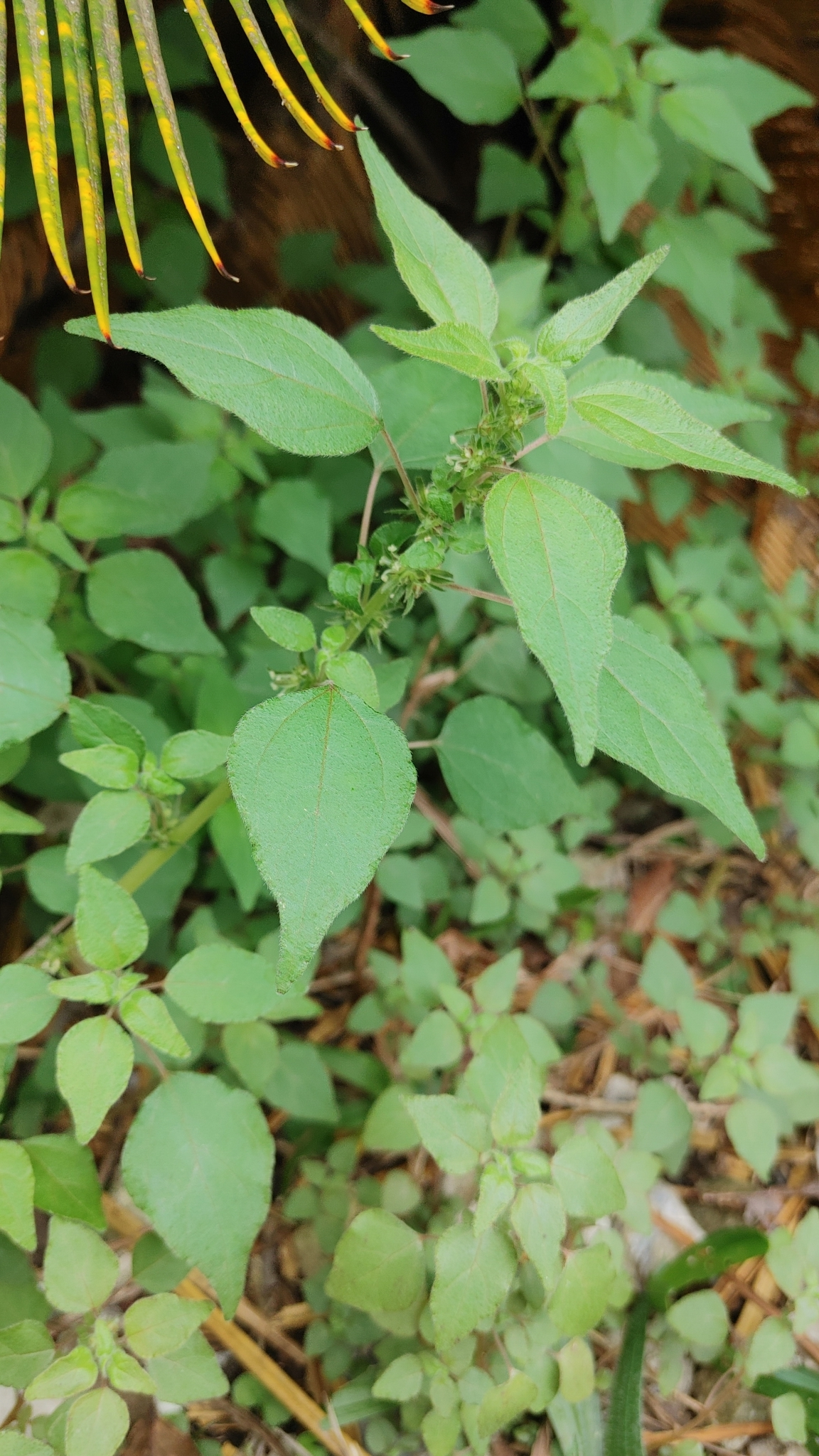

Scientific classification
- Kingdom: Plantae
- Clade: Tracheophytes
- Clade: Angiosperms
- Clade: Eudicots
- Clade: Rosids
- Order: Rosales
- Family: Urticaceae
- Genus: Parietaria
- Species: P. praetermissa

Binomial name
- Parietaria praetermissa Hinton

= Parietaria praetermissa =

Species of flowering plant

Parietaria praetermissa, the clustered pellitory, is a plant species native to the coastal plains of the southeastern United States, i.e., Georgia, Florida, Louisiana, North Carolina and South Carolina. It grows in hammocks, waste places, calcareous outcrops, etc., at elevations of 10 m (33 feet).

Parietaria praetermissa is an annual, trailing herb up to 55 cm (22 inches) tall. Leaves are ovate or lanceolate, up to 6.5 cm (2.6 inches) long.

According to Hinton, Parietaria praetermissa was for many years erroneous called Parietaria floridana. However, when Hinton examined the type specimen of P. floridana, he discovered that it was a different species, the only that had been called Parietaria nummularia. Under the rules of botanical nomenclature, this meant that P. nummularia needed to be renamed P. floridana, and the species that had long been called P. floridana was in fact an undescribed species, one which Hinton described as P. praetermissa.
