= Ceroprepes nigrolineatella =

Scientific classification
- Domain: Eukaryota
- Kingdom: Animalia
- Phylum: Arthropoda
- Class: Insecta
- Order: Lepidoptera
- Family: Pyralidae
- Genus: Ceroprepes
- Species: C. nigrolineatella

Binomial name
- Ceroprepes nigrolineatella Shibuya, 1927

Synonyms
- Ceroprepes jansei West, 1931

Species of moth

Ceroprepes nigrolineatella is a species of snout moth in the genus Ceroprepes. It was described by Shibuya in 1927, and is known from Japan and Taiwan.
