= Ceroprepes ophthalmicella =

Scientific classification
- Domain: Eukaryota
- Kingdom: Animalia
- Phylum: Arthropoda
- Class: Insecta
- Order: Lepidoptera
- Family: Pyralidae
- Genus: Ceroprepes
- Species: C. ophthalmicella

Binomial name
- Ceroprepes ophthalmicella (Christoph, 1881)

Synonyms
- Pempelia ophthalmicella Christoph, 1881

Species of moth

Ceroprepes ophthalmicella is a species of snout moth in the genus Ceroprepes. It was described by Hugo Theodor Christoph in 1881 and is known from the Russian Far East, Japan, Korea, China and Taiwan.

The wingspan is 20–27 mm.
