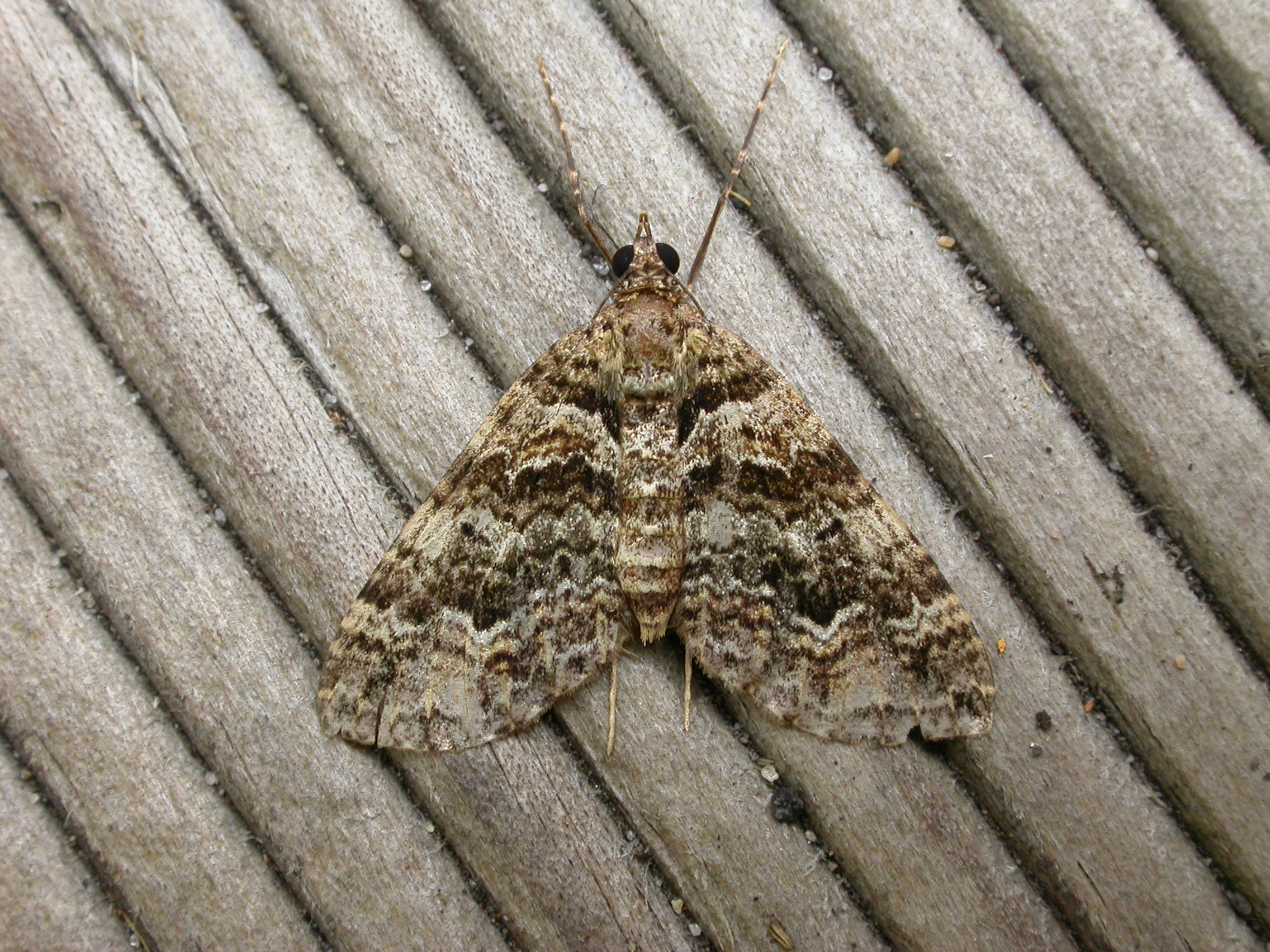

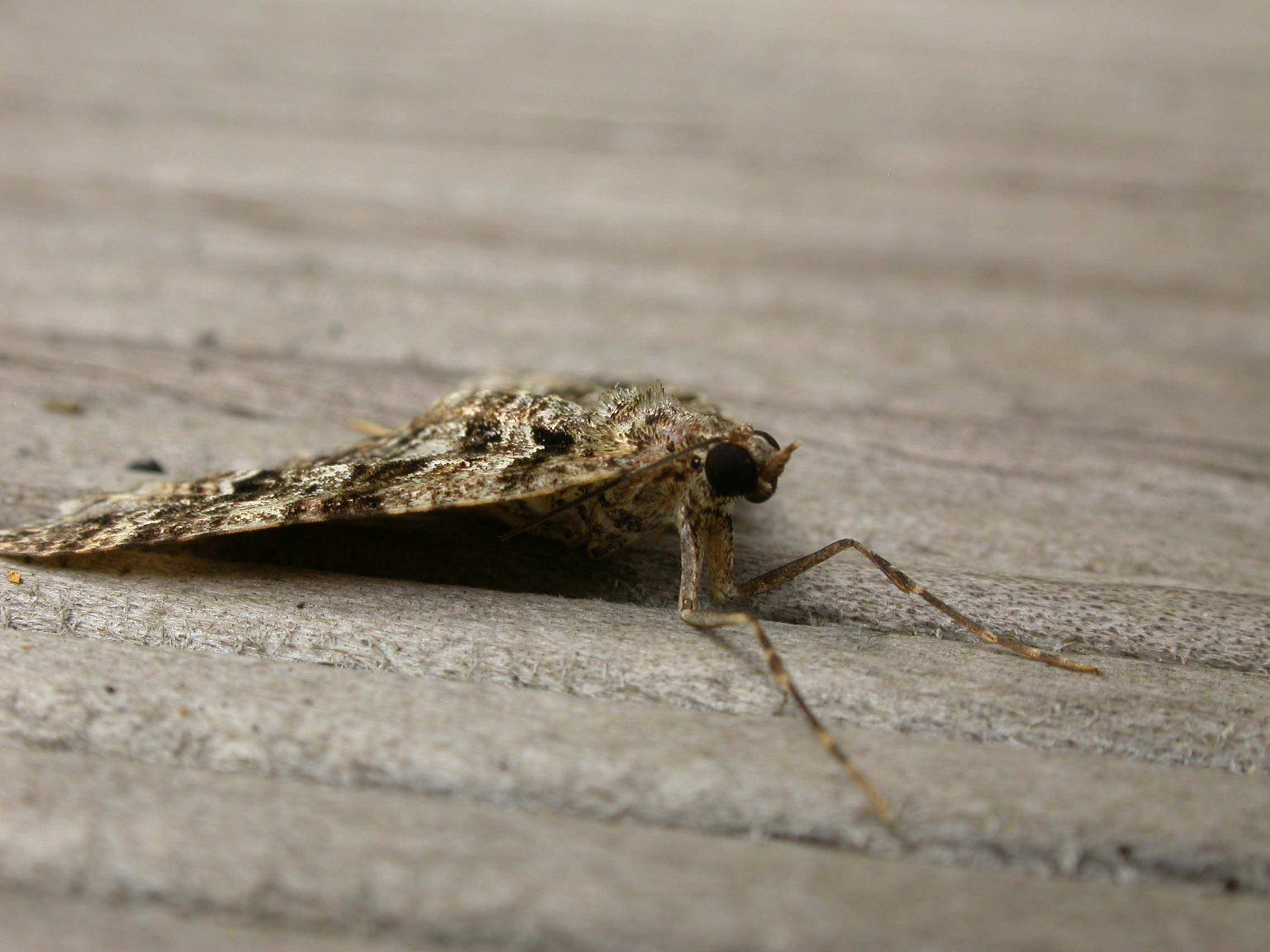

Scientific classification
- Kingdom: Animalia
- Phylum: Arthropoda
- Clade: Pancrustacea
- Class: Insecta
- Order: Lepidoptera
- Family: Geometridae
- Genus: Crasilogia
- Species: C. gressitti

Binomial name
- Crasilogia gressitti Holloway, 1984

= Crasilogia gressitti =

Species of moth

Crasilogia gressitti is a species of moth of the family Geometridae first described by Jeremy Daniel Holloway in 1984. It is found in Australia (including New South Wales and Queensland).
