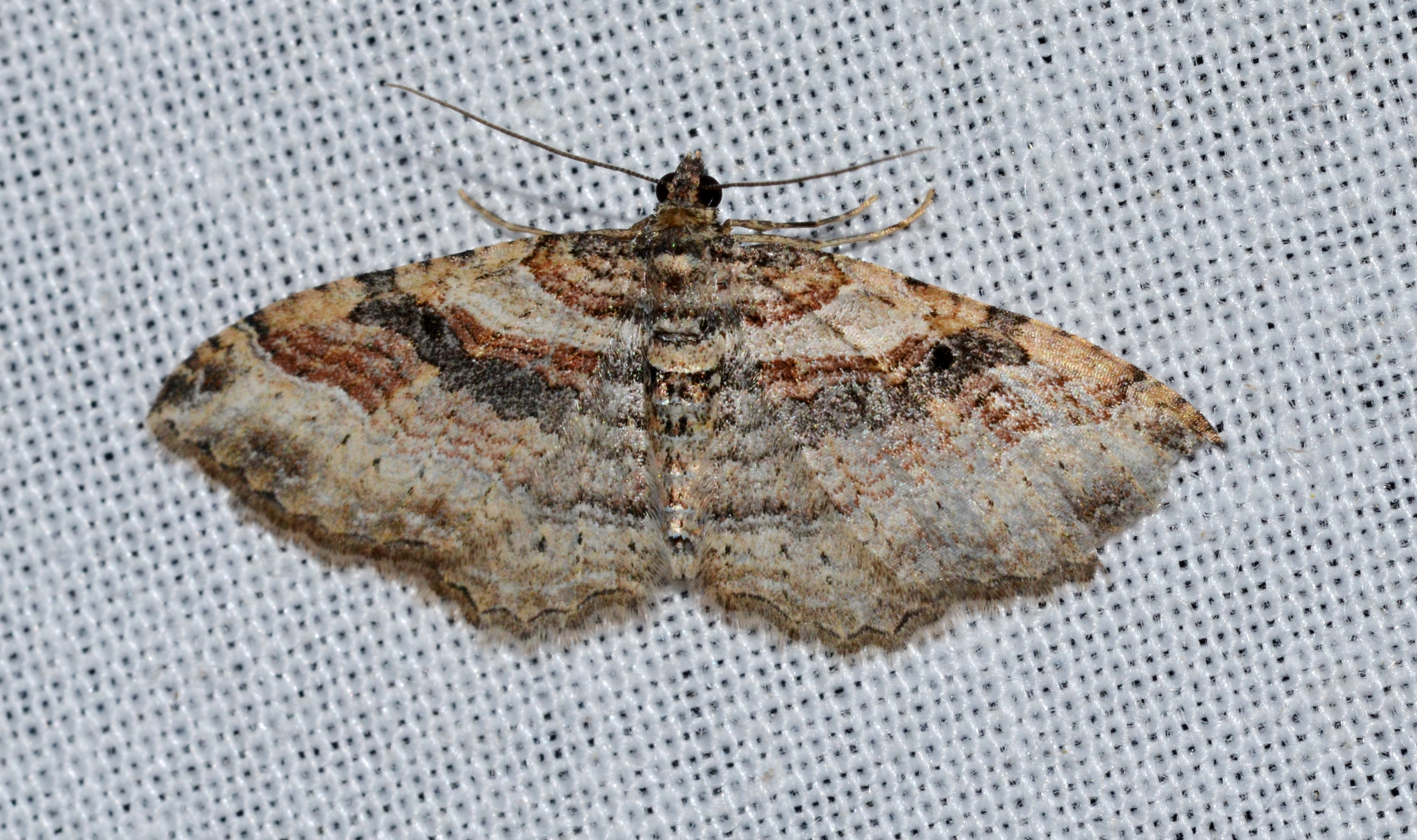
- Costaconvexa centrostrigaria

Scientific classification
- Domain: Eukaryota
- Kingdom: Animalia
- Phylum: Arthropoda
- Class: Insecta
- Order: Lepidoptera
- Family: Geometridae
- Tribe: Xanthorhoini
- Genus: Costaconvexa; Agenjo, 1949

Synonyms
- Crasilogia Warren, 1903

= Costaconvexa =

Genus of moths

Costaconvexa is a genus of moths in the family Geometridae first described by Ramón Agenjo Cecilia in 1949.

== Species ==
- Costaconvexa caespitaria (Christoph, 1881)
- Costaconvexa centrostrigaria (Wollaston, 1858) – bent-line carpet
- Costaconvexa polygrammata (Borkhausen, 1794) – many-lined moth
