= Ceroprepes jilongensis =

Scientific classification
- Domain: Eukaryota
- Kingdom: Animalia
- Phylum: Arthropoda
- Class: Insecta
- Order: Lepidoptera
- Family: Pyralidae
- Genus: Ceroprepes
- Species: C. jilongensis

Binomial name
- Ceroprepes jilongensis Du, Song & Yang, 2005

Species of moth

Ceroprepes jilongensis is a species of snout moth in the genus Ceroprepes. It was described by Y. Du, S. Song and D. Yang in 2005 and is known from China.
