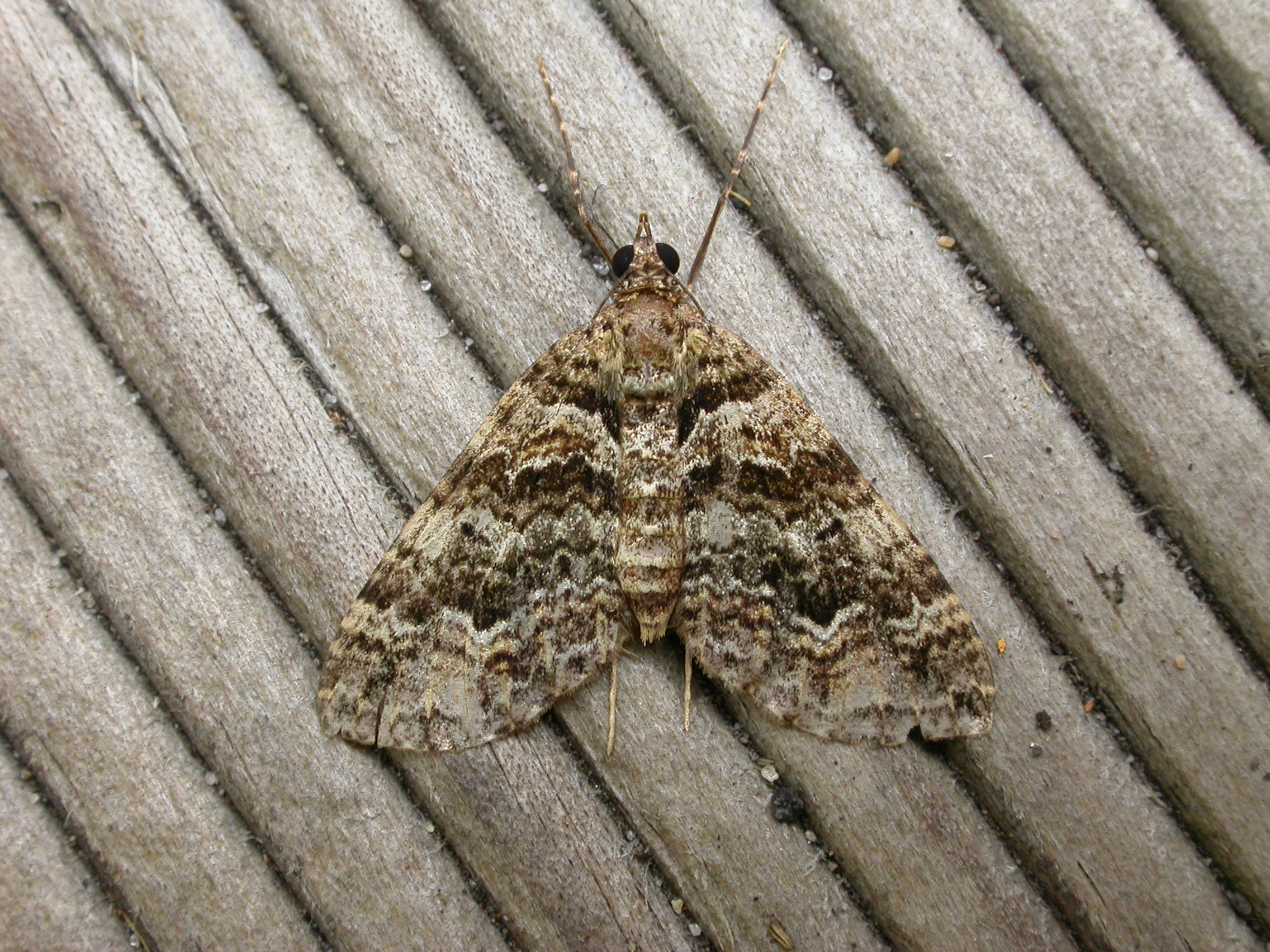
- Crasilogia gressitti

Scientific classification
- Kingdom: Animalia
- Phylum: Arthropoda
- Class: Insecta
- Order: Lepidoptera
- Family: Geometridae
- Tribe: Xanthorhoini
- Genus: Crasilogia; Warren, 1903

= Crasilogia =

Genus of moths

Crasilogia is a genus of moths in the family Geometridae described by Warren in 1903. It is sometimes considered a synonym of Costaconvexa.

== Species ==
- Crasilogia dispar Warren, 1903
- Crasilogia flavipennis Warren, 1907
- Crasilogia fulvitincta Joicey & Talbot, 1917
- Crasilogia fumipennis Warren, 1906
- Crasilogia gressitti Holloway, 1984
- Crasilogia simplex (Prout, 1940)
