= Caffeoylmalic acid =

Names
- IUPAC name 2-[(E)-3-(3,4-dihydroxyphenyl)prop-2-enoyl]oxybutanedioic acid
- Other names (+)-(E)-caffeoyl-L-malic acid

Identifiers
CAS Number	39015-77-5
3D model (JSmol)	Interactive image
ChemSpider	4816367
PubChem CID	6124299
UNII	8EY7S5QS7D
CompTox Dashboard (EPA)	DTXSID301031926
- InChI: InChI=1S/C13H12O8/c14-8-3-1-7(5-9(8)15)2-4-12(18)21-10(13(19)20)6-11(16)17/h1-5,10,14-15H,6H2,(H,16,17)(H,19,20)/b4-2+ Key: PMKQSEYPLQIEAY-DUXPYHPUSA-N; InChI=1/C13H12O8/c14-8-3-1-7(5-9(8)15)2-4-12(18)21-10(13(19)20)6-11(16)17/h1-5,10,14-15H,6H2,(H,16,17)(H,19,20)/b4-2+ Key: PMKQSEYPLQIEAY-DUXPYHPUBQ
- SMILES: C1=CC(=C(C=C1C=CC(=O)OC(CC(=O)O)C(=O)O)O)O

Properties
Chemical formula	C_{13}H_{12}O_{8}
Molar mass	296.231 g·mol^{−1}
- Except where otherwise noted, data are given for materials in their standard state (at 25 °C [77 °F], 100 kPa). Infobox references

Caffeoylmalic acid is an ester of caffeic acid and malic acid found in the leaves and flowers of Parietaria officinalis. It is also found in Chelidonium majus and Urtica dioica.
