= Ceroprepes patriciella =

Scientific classification
- Kingdom: Animalia
- Phylum: Arthropoda
- Clade: Pancrustacea
- Class: Insecta
- Order: Lepidoptera
- Family: Pyralidae
- Genus: Ceroprepes
- Species: C. patriciella

Binomial name
- Ceroprepes patriciella Zeller, 1867

Synonyms
- Trachonitis rufibasella Yamanaka, 1978

Species of moth

Ceroprepes patriciella is a species of snout moth in the genus Ceroprepes. It was described by Philipp Christoph Zeller in 1867, and is known from India and Japan.
