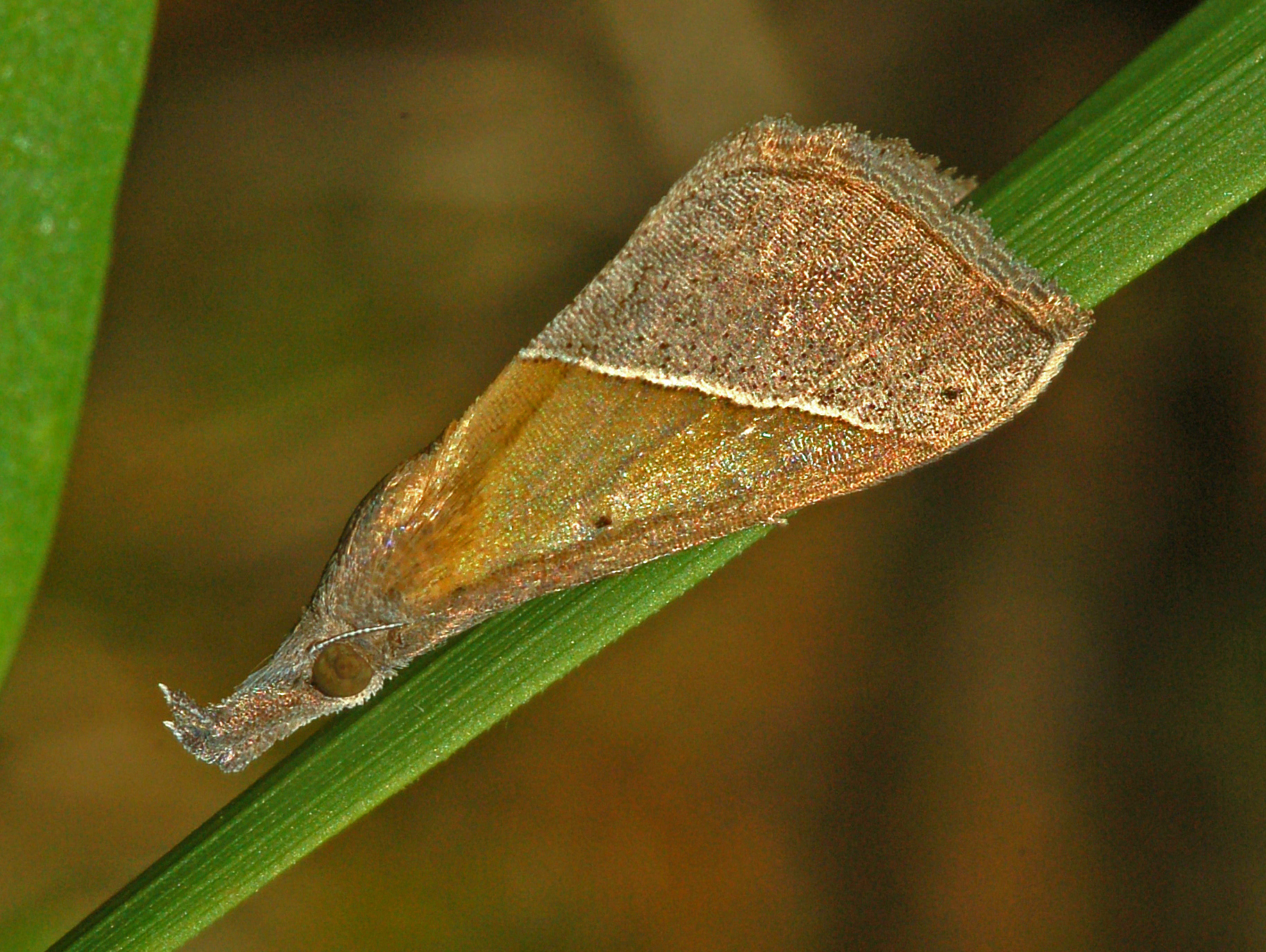

Scientific classification
- Domain: Eukaryota
- Kingdom: Animalia
- Phylum: Arthropoda
- Class: Insecta
- Order: Lepidoptera
- Superfamily: Noctuoidea
- Family: Erebidae
- Genus: Hypena
- Species: H. lividalis

Binomial name
- Hypena lividalis (Hübner, 1796)

Synonyms
- Pyralis lividalis Hübner, 1796; Hypena abjuralis Walker, [1859]

= Hypena lividalis =

Species of moth

Hypena lividalis is a moth of the family Erebidae. It has an Afrotropical and possibly Circumtropical distribution. It is known from the western parts of the Palearctic realm and the Neotropical realm.

Adults are on wing year round. There are multiple generations per year.

The larvae feed on Parietaria and Urtica species.
