= Scoparia carvalhoi =

Scientific classification
- Kingdom: Animalia
- Phylum: Arthropoda
- Clade: Pancrustacea
- Class: Insecta
- Order: Lepidoptera
- Family: Crambidae
- Genus: Scoparia
- Species: S. carvalhoi

Binomial name
- Scoparia carvalhoi Nuss, Karsholt & Meyer, 1998

Species of moth

Scoparia carvalhoi is a species of moth in the family Crambidae. It is found on the Azores.
