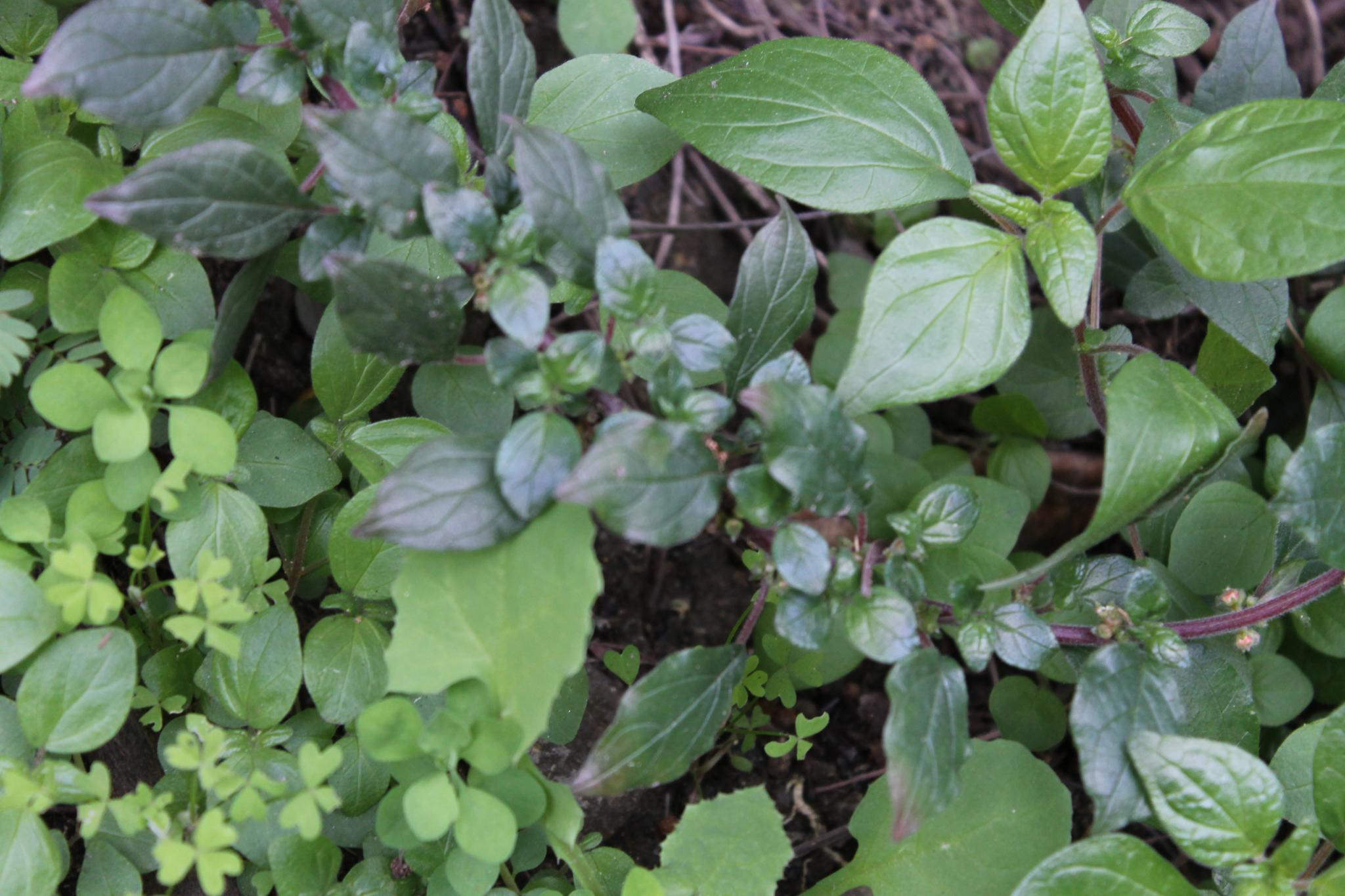

Scientific classification
- Kingdom: Plantae
- Clade: Embryophytes
- Clade: Tracheophytes
- Clade: Spermatophytes
- Clade: Angiosperms
- Clade: Eudicots
- Clade: Rosids
- Order: Rosales
- Family: Urticaceae
- Genus: Parietaria
- Species: P. debilis

Binomial name
- Parietaria debilis G.Forst

Synonyms
- Parietaria micrantha Ledeb.

= Parietaria debilis =

Species of plant

Parietaria debilis, commonly known as pellitory, small-flower pellitory, or native pellitory, is a herb native to Australia and New Zealand.

== Description ==
It grows as an annual herb from 7 to 40 centimetres in height, with green or white flowers. Individual plants bear both perfect and imperfect flowers.

== Taxonomy ==
This species was published in 1786 by Georg Forster, based on a type specimen collected in New Zealand. It has twice been moved to other genera—to Urtica by Stephan Endlicher in 1833, and to Freirea by Alexander Viktorovich Jarmolenko in 1941—but neither move was accepted.

== Distribution and habitat ==
It is native to Australia and New Zealand. In Australia it is widespread in temperate regions, occurring in every state and territory. It favours well-drained sites, especially in calcareous soils.

== Research ==
DNA was able to be extracted, and the chloroplast DNA trnL–trnF intergenic spacer and trnL intron were sequenced, from a herbarium specimen of Parietaria debilis collected by Joseph Banks and Daniel Solander on Captain James Cook’s first voyage in 1769–70.
