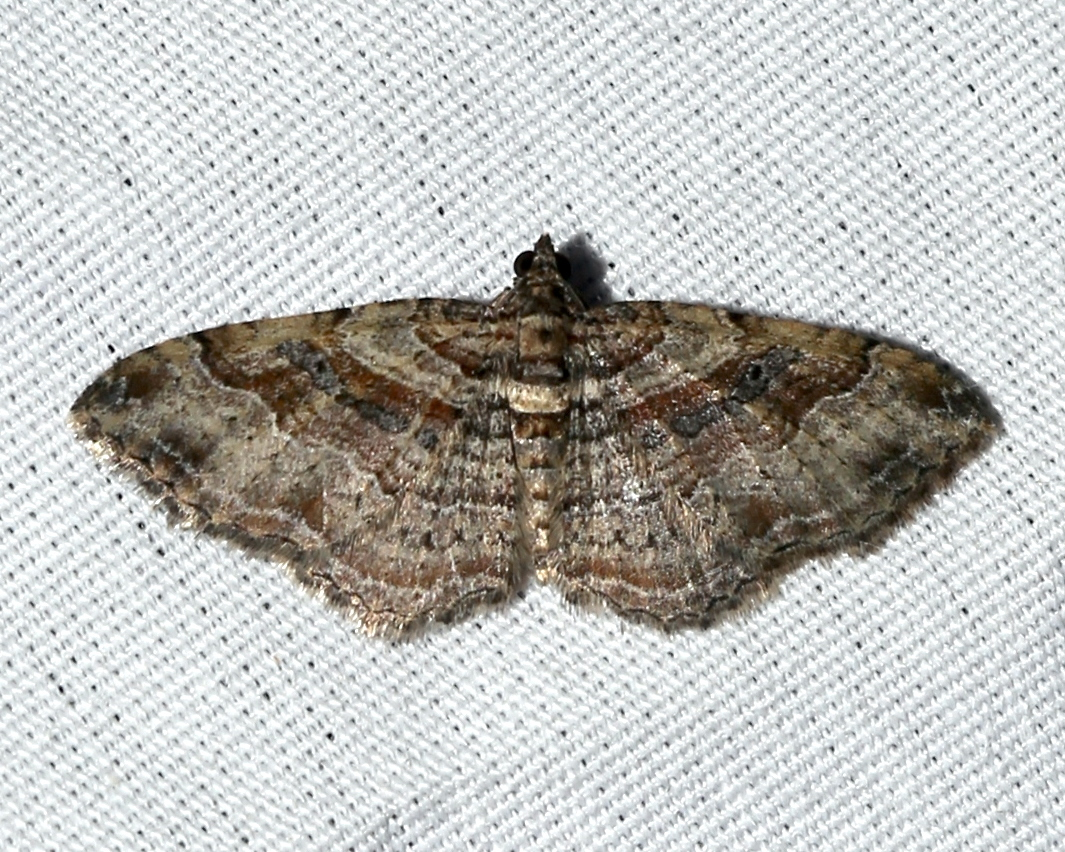

Scientific classification
- Kingdom: Animalia
- Phylum: Arthropoda
- Clade: Pancrustacea
- Class: Insecta
- Order: Lepidoptera
- Family: Geometridae
- Genus: Costaconvexa
- Species: C. centrostrigaria

Binomial name
- Costaconvexa centrostrigaria (Wollaston, 1858)

Synonyms
- Coremia centrostrigaria Wollaston, 1858; Orthonama centrostrigaria; Costaconvexa mediata (Walker, 1862); Costaconvexa latirupta (Walker, 1866); Costaconvexa luscinata (Zeller, 1873); Costaconvexa interruptata (Rebel, 1894); Costaconvexa paranensis (Schaus, 1901)

= Costaconvexa centrostrigaria =

Species of moth

Costaconvexa centrostrigaria, the traveller or bent-line carpet, is a moth in the family Geometridae. It is native to most of North America, except the Arctic. It is an introduced species in Great Britain, the Canary Islands, the Azores and Madeira.

The wingspan is 17–23 mm. Adults are on wing from May to October in Ontario, March to November in north-eastern North America and year-round in Texas and the west. There are two or more generations per year.

The larvae feed on Polygonum species.
