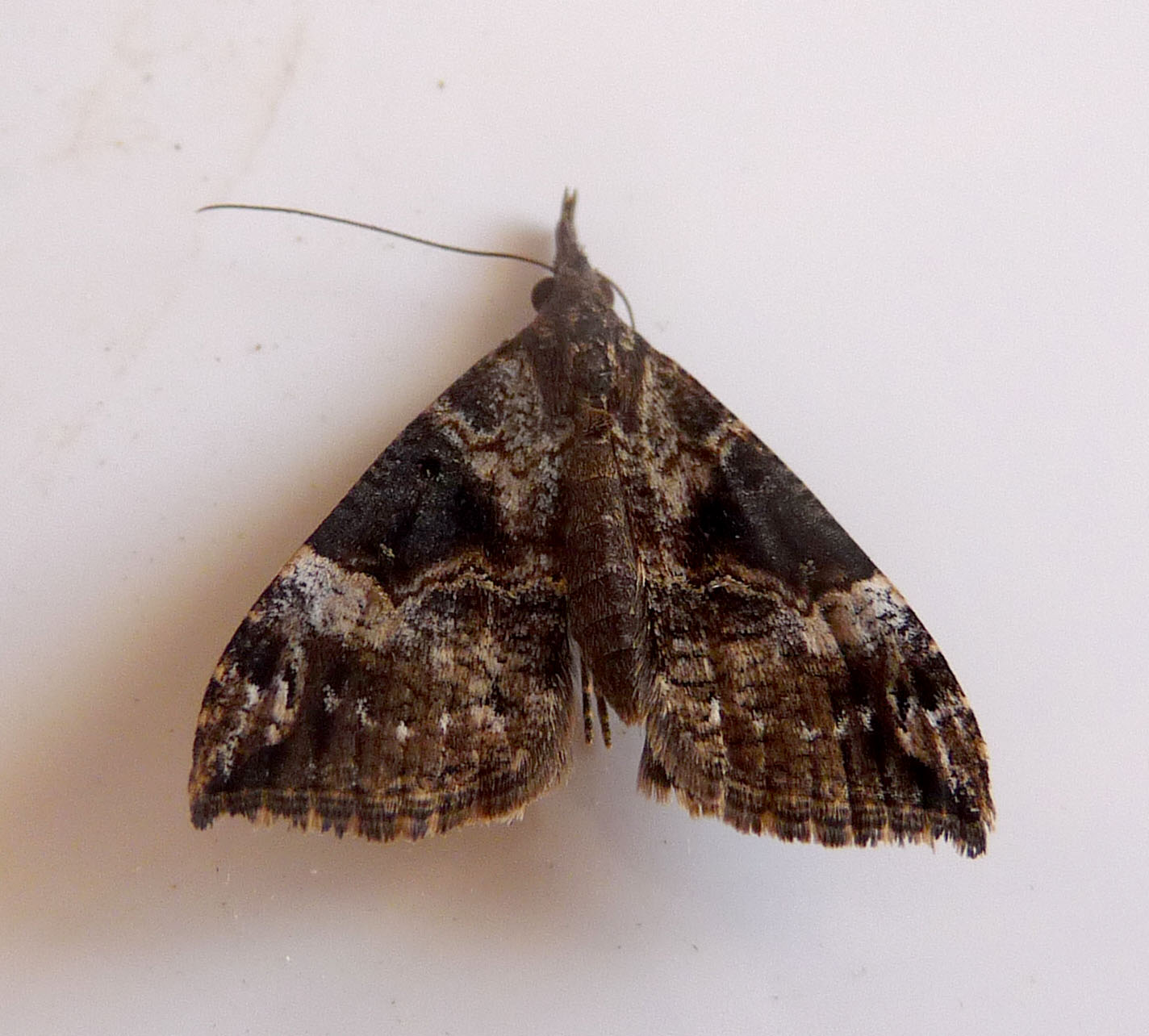

Scientific classification
- Domain: Eukaryota
- Kingdom: Animalia
- Phylum: Arthropoda
- Class: Insecta
- Order: Lepidoptera
- Superfamily: Noctuoidea
- Family: Erebidae
- Genus: Hypena
- Species: H. obsitalis

Binomial name
- Hypena obsitalis (Hübner, 1813)

Synonyms
- Pyralis obsitalis Hübner, 1813

= Hypena obsitalis =

Bloxworth snout

Species of moth

Hypena obsitalis, the Bloxworth snout, is a moth of the family Erebidae. It is found in the Mediterranean Basin including North Africa and in the Near East and Middle East, south up to the Sahara. Further north it is a migrant which occasionally establishes.

== Technical description and variation ==
The wingspan is 28–36 mm. Forewing whitish in female, grey in male, more or less suffused with grey and fuscous and covered with dark transverse striae; the lines waved, dark with pale edges; the outer angled shortly outwards on each fold and inwards on vein 2, followed on costal half by a grey patch in male and a white patch in female; a pale triangular apical patch, edged below by a dark oblique shade from apex, containing three black teeth; the submarginal line pale and wavy, preceded in costal half by black teeth; stigmata marked by tufts of raised dark scales; a row of black dashes along termen; fringe shining grey, with a dark middle line; all the pale areas are intensified in the female; hindwing fuscous with black terminal line

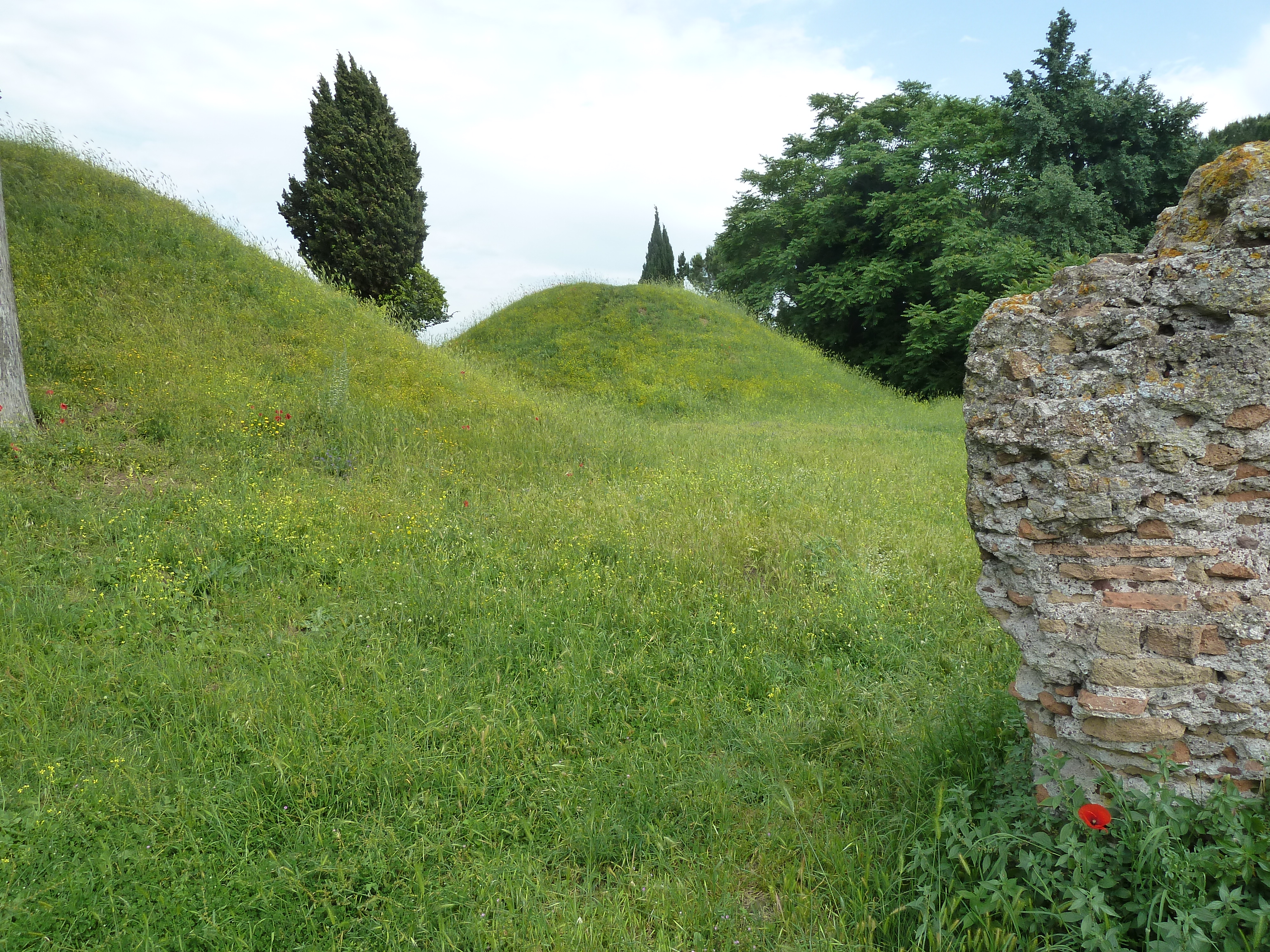
Habitat in Italy

== Biology ==
Adults are on wing from July to August and from September to October in Europe. There are two or more generations per year.

Larva green with dark dorsal line and paler subdorsal lines. The larvae feed on Parietaria and Urtica species.
