= Scoparia coecimaculalis =

Scientific classification
- Kingdom: Animalia
- Phylum: Arthropoda
- Class: Insecta
- Order: Lepidoptera
- Family: Crambidae
- Genus: Scoparia
- Species: S. coecimaculalis

Binomial name
- Scoparia coecimaculalis Warren, 1905

Species of moth

Scoparia coecimaculalis is a species of moth in the family Crambidae. It is found on the Azores.

The wingspan is about 10 mm. The forewings are brownish grey, with fuscous speckling and markings. The hindwings are hyaline whitish, tinged with grey at the apex.
