= Eudonia melanographa =

Scientific classification
- Kingdom: Animalia
- Phylum: Arthropoda
- Class: Insecta
- Order: Lepidoptera
- Family: Crambidae
- Genus: Eudonia
- Species: E. melanographa

Binomial name
- Eudonia melanographa (Hampson, 1907)

Synonyms
- Scoparia melanographa Hampson, 1907

Species of moth

Eudonia melanographa is a species of moth in the family Crambidae. It is found on the Azores.
