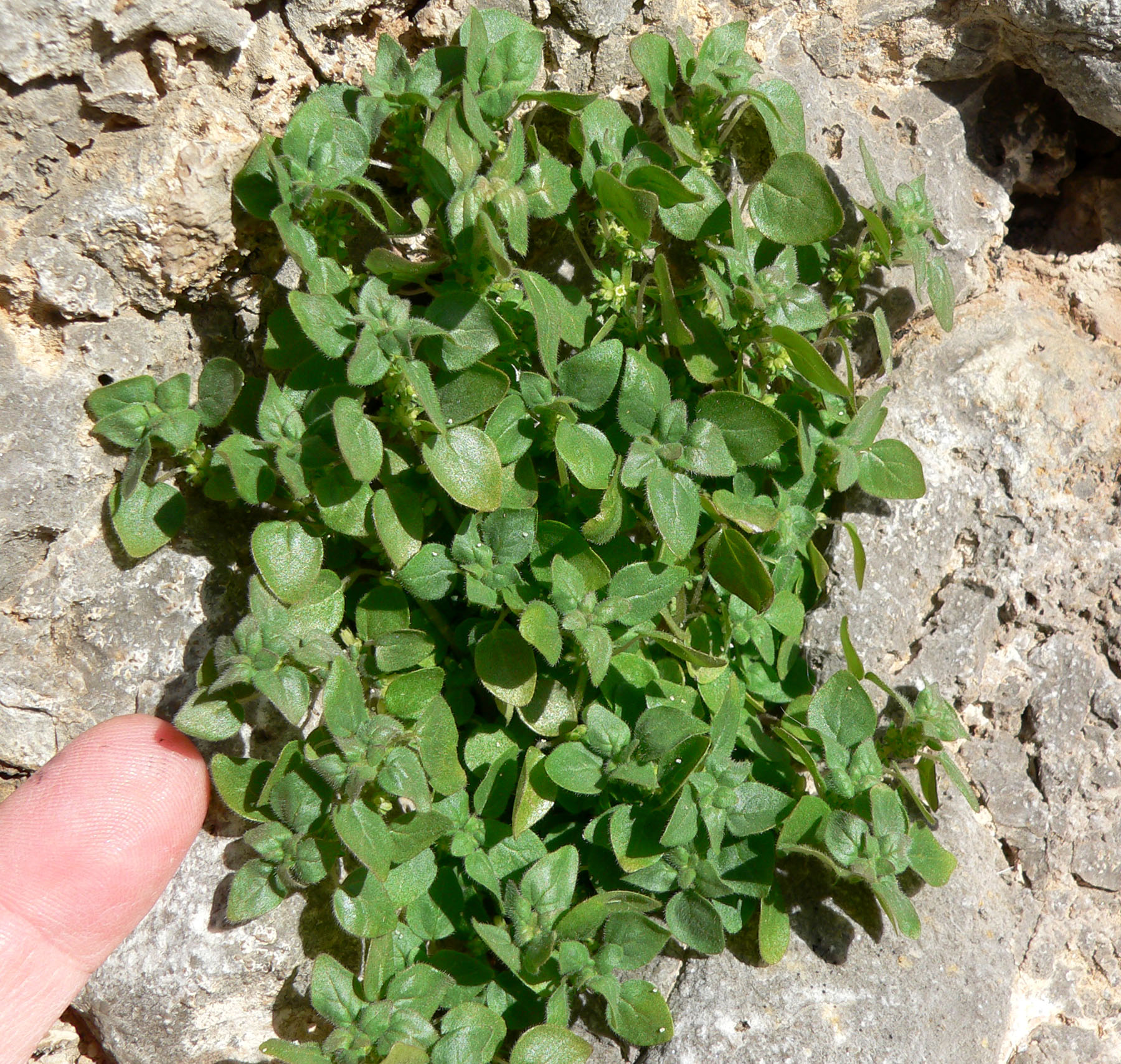
- var. hespera

Conservation status
- Secure (NatureServe)

Scientific classification
- Kingdom: Plantae
- Clade: Tracheophytes
- Clade: Angiosperms
- Clade: Eudicots
- Clade: Rosids
- Order: Rosales
- Family: Urticaceae
- Genus: Parietaria
- Species: P. hespera

Binomial name
- Parietaria hespera Hinton

= Parietaria hespera =

Species of flowering plant

Parietaria hespera is a species of flowering plant in the nettle family known by the common name rillita pellitory. It is native to the southwestern United States and northwestern Mexico, where it grows in many types of habitat, from coast to desert, dry to moist, and sometimes in disturbed areas. It is an annual herb taking an erect or spreading form up to half a meter long or forming a mat or dense tangle. The stems may branch or not. They are lined with alternately arranged leaves up to 2 centimeters long and varying in shape from oval to round or somewhat kidney-shaped. The inflorescence is a cluster of flowers emerging from the leaf axils. The flower has no petals but greenish sepals which may be tinged yellowish or reddish brown.

As of November 2013, The Plant List did not accept this species, regarding its status as unresolved.
