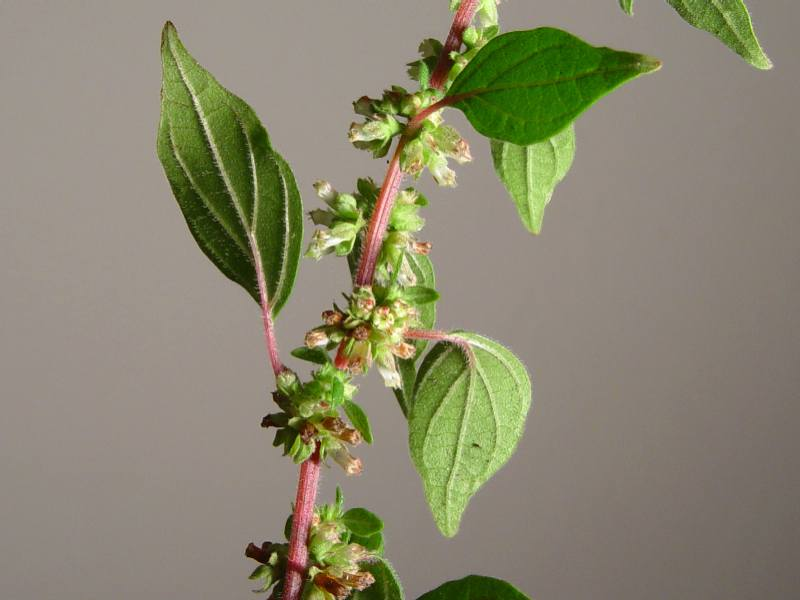

Conservation status
- Least Concern (IUCN 3.1)

Scientific classification
- Kingdom: Plantae
- Clade: Tracheophytes
- Clade: Angiosperms
- Clade: Eudicots
- Clade: Rosids
- Order: Rosales
- Family: Urticaceae
- Genus: Parietaria
- Species: P. judaica

Binomial name
- Parietaria judaica L.

Synonyms
- Parietaria diffusa Mert. & W.D.J.Koch

= Parietaria judaica =

Species of flowering plant

Parietaria judaica, spreading pellitory, is a species of herbaceous perennial flowering plant in the family Urticaceae. It is native to the eastern Mediterranean and Middle East, and is widely established worldwide as an urban weed. Its pollen is a significant cause of asthma and other allergies in warmer countries, but it is also valued as a contributor to biodiversity in polluted cities and it has been used as a medicinal herb.

== Description ==
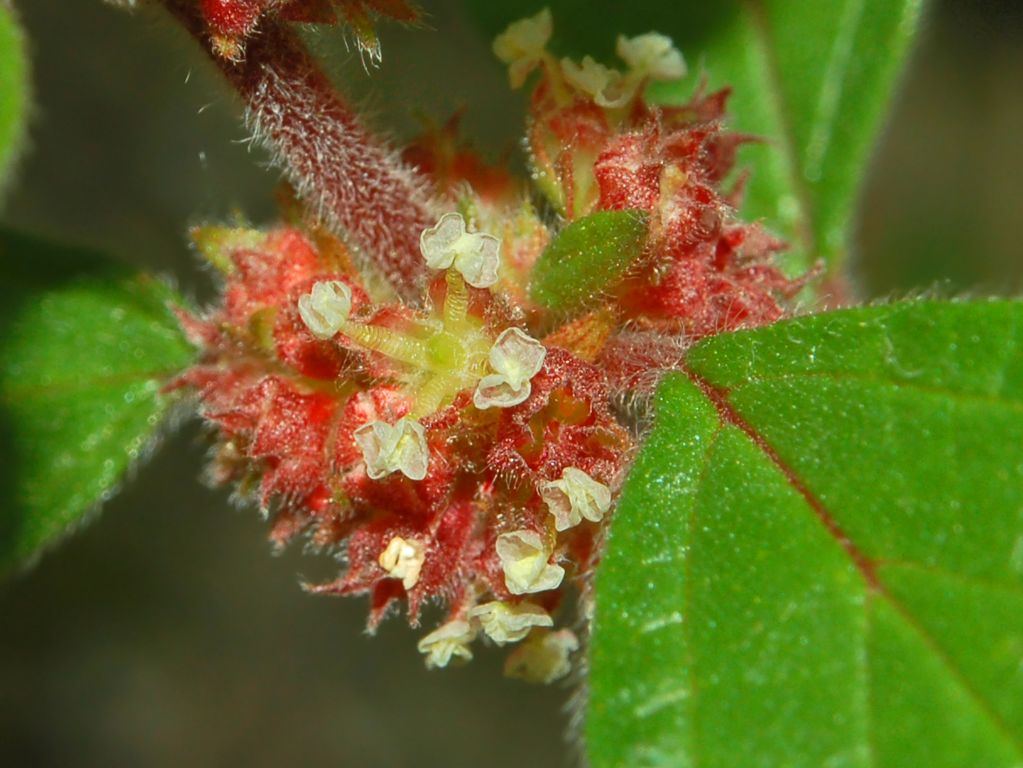
Close-up of a hermaphroditic flower before the stigma develops, showing the discharged anthers

Spreading pellitory is a perennial herb about 50 cm (up to 110 cm) tall with an upright to sprawling untidy habit. Plants can have many branched stems, which are pink or red and slightly woody and brittle at the base.

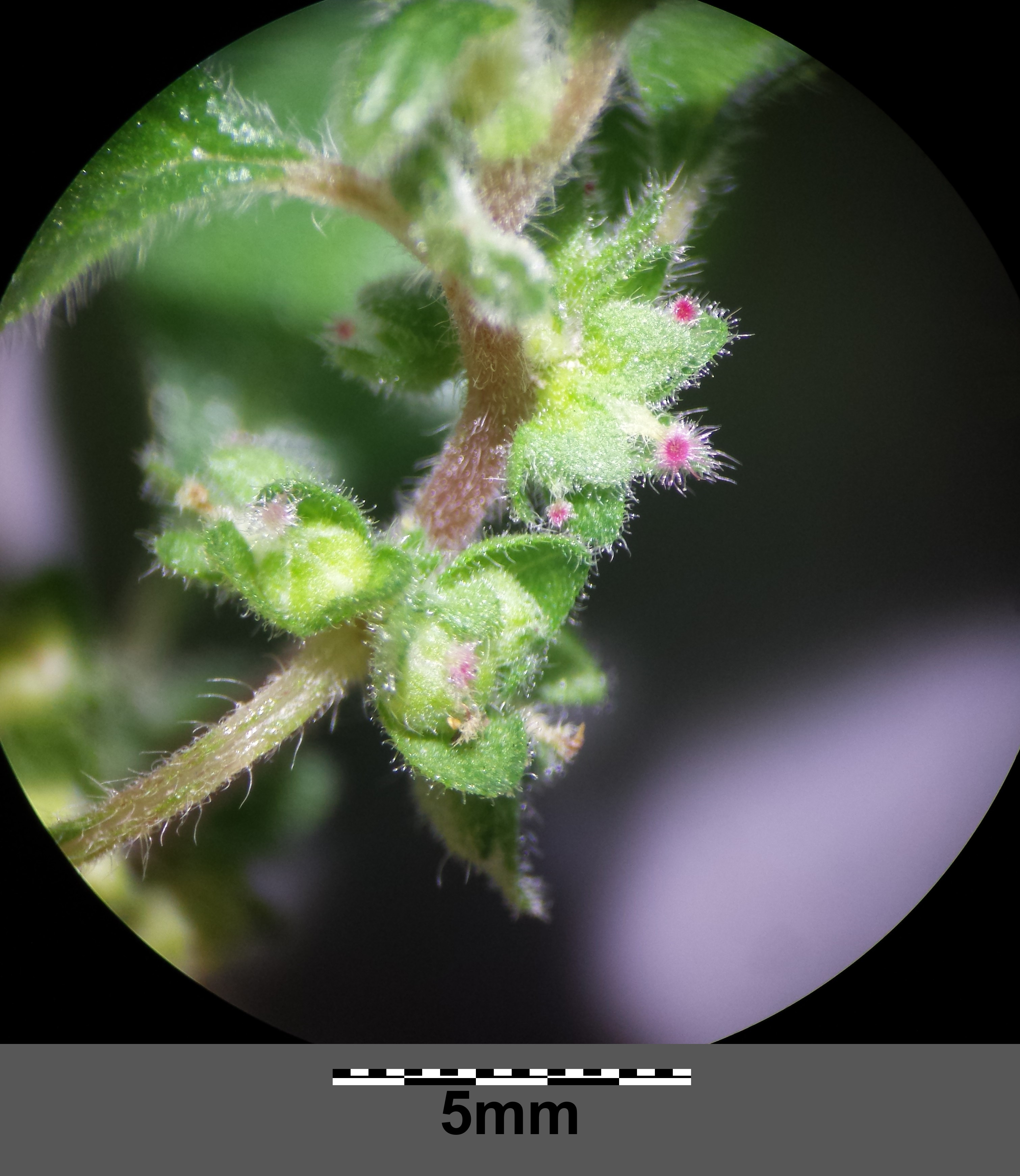
After pollination, the fruit begins to develop; here the red feathery stigmas can still be seen

The leaves are alternate, oval lanceolate, typically 3 cm long x 1.5 cm wide (exceptionally up to 6 cm x 3 cm) with a petiole about half as long as the blade. The veins on the lower side of the leaf are softly hairy, as are the leaf margins and the petiole. The upper surface is often glossy and either glabrous or with scattered hairs, and with sunken veins.

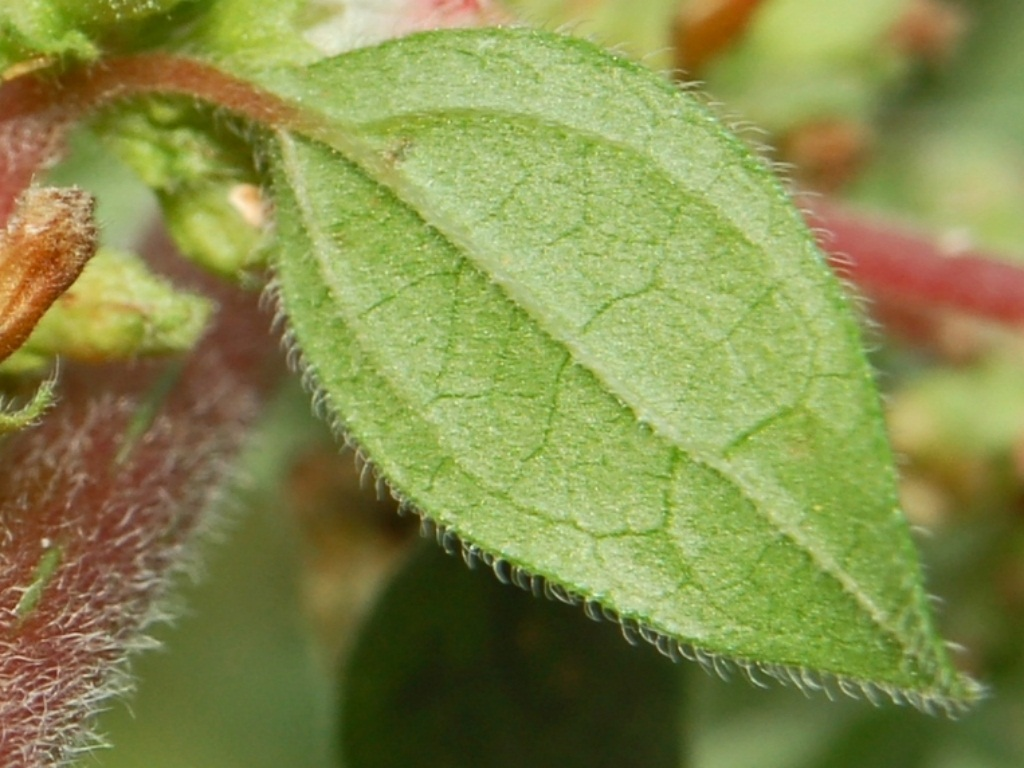
Close-up of a leaf, showing venation and hairiness

Flowering can occur all year in suitable conditions in Europe. The inflorescence consists of clusters in the leaf axils. Each cluster comprises 3-8 white or pink flowers, subtended by tiny bracts, of which typically one is female-only and the other 2-7 are hermaphroditic (although towards the eastern part of its range, the presence of female flowers is less common.) The female flower has 4 perianth segments (petals) and is 2 mm diameter (in fruit). The hermaphroditic flowers are tubular and up to 3 mm across (in fruit), with 4-5 stamens, which mature first, and one stigma, which develops later. When a hermaphroditic flower first opens, the stamen's filaments are so elastic that they spring suddenly outward, dispersing the pollen ballistically from the anthers.

The fruits are blackish achenes and often fall with the perianth, which has a proportion of minutely hooked hairs that produce the "stickiness" for which the plant is well-known.

== Identification ==
Spreading pellitory is quite a distinctive plant. The species it is most likely to be confused with, where their ranges meet (e.g. in the eastern Mediterranean), is upright pellitory, Parietaria officinalis. Under normal circumstances they should be fairly easy to separate, as upright pellitory has erect stems and large leaves (up to 12 cm, compared to less than 6 cm) but in intermediate plants the flower anatomy needs to be examined. Upright pellitory has a larger female flower (2.75 mm or more) than spreading pellitory (2.25 mm or less), and it is much longer than the bracts rather than about the same length.

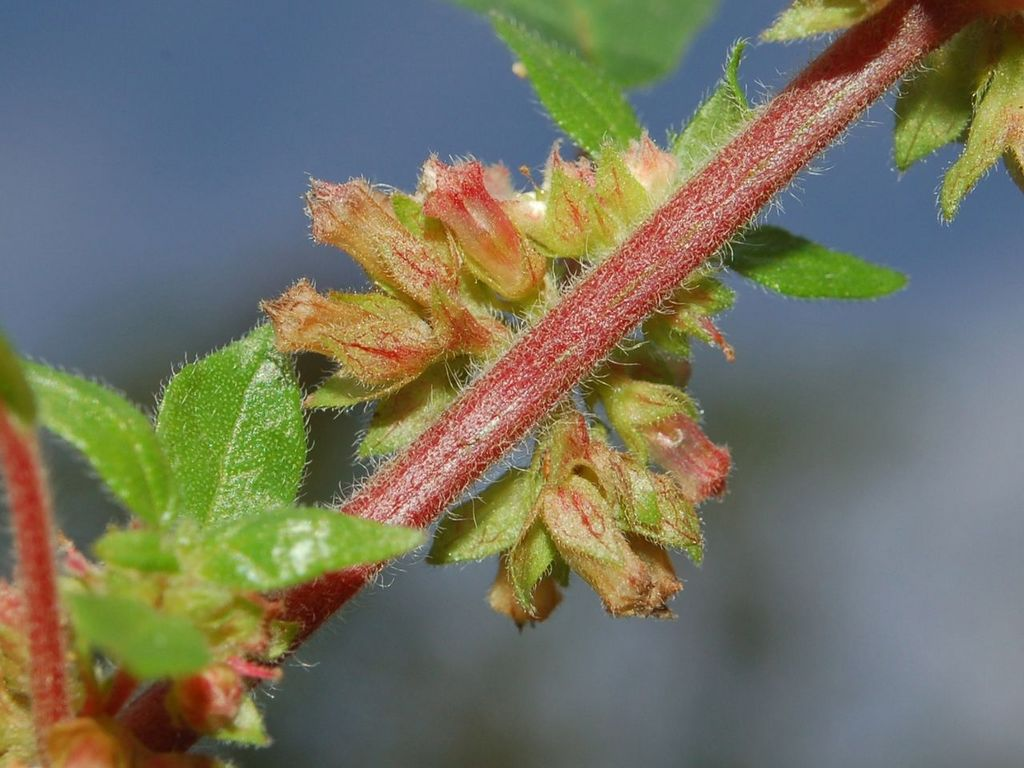
A length of stem with a cluster of flowers

== Taxonomy ==
The scientific name for spreading pellitory was coined by Linnaeus in the second edition of Species Plantarum in 1763, based on his description of a specimen collected in Palestine by Fredrik Hasselqvist (hence the specific epithet judaica (Latin): of Judaea, Jewish). This is the name that is widely used now, although for a long time British plants were known as Parietaria diffusa Mertens & Koch. The generic name Parietaria is derived from the Latin for "wall", paries, via the adjective parietalis ("borne on the wall"). The common name pellitory is most likely an Old French corruption of Parietaria.

In Species Plantarum Linnaeus assigned it the planet symbol for Jupiter (♃); This is simply a code to show that the plant is a perennial.

There are no accepted subspecies or varieties of spreading pellitory; nor does it hybridise with any other species.

Its chromosome number is 2n = 26.

In England it is usually called "Pellitory-of-the-wall" (with the capital P and the hyphens) but elsewhere the less idiosyncratic name "spreading pellitory" is generally used, which contrasts well with "upright pellitory" for Parietaria officinalis. Some popular sources give alternative nicknames "asthma weed" and '"sticky-weed" but it is, of course, not the only plant with these properties.

== Distribution and status ==
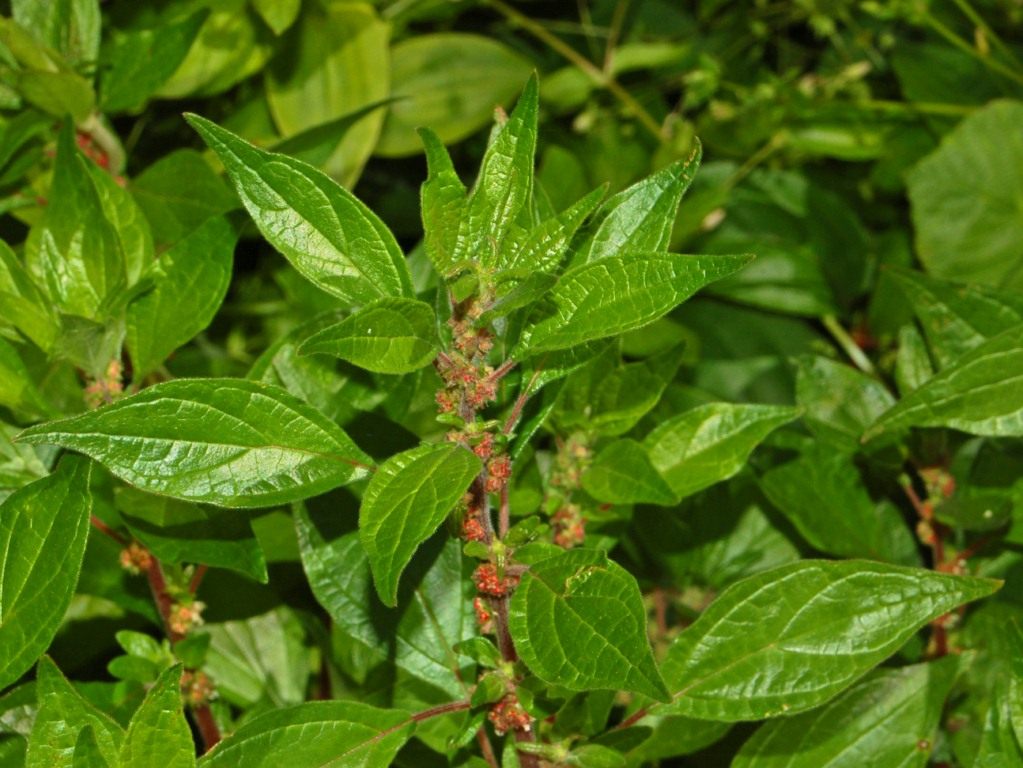
A typical patch of spreading pellitory in flower

Spreading pellitory is a native of Macaronesia, N. Africa, Europe to Central Asia and Central Himalaya but has been introduced to parts of north and south Americas, Scandinavia and Australia.

The IUCN has not yet evaluated the global status of spreading pellitory, but in France, Britain and elsewhere it is considered unthreatened ("Least Concern", or LC), although in some regions it is rarer; for example, in Lorraine it is classified as endangered (EN) and it is absent from Alsace altogether.

It is a lowland plant, being recorded from sea level up to about 125 m in California and no higher than 200 m anywhere in the United States. Altitudinal data for it is not collected in Britain, but analysis of the regions where it grows shows no land above 500 m and very little over 300 m.

== Habitat and ecology ==
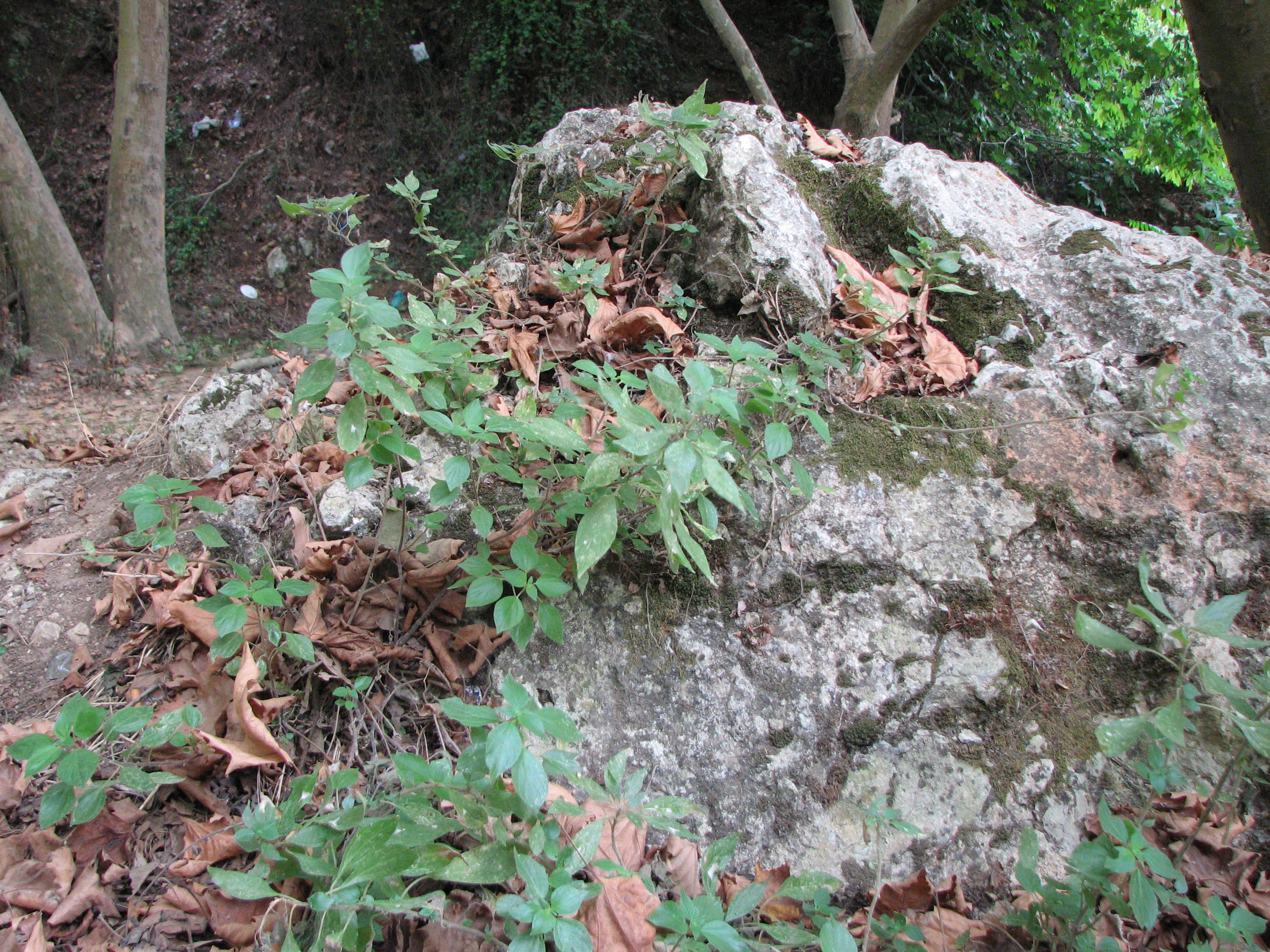
A patch of spreading pellitory in its native habitat in Lebanon

In its native habitat, spreading pellitory grows on rocks and bare ground in slightly damp and sheltered places such as seasonal river valleys in limestone areas of the Eastern Mediterranean. It is, however, well adapted to synanthropic habitats in towns, where it can exploit the urban heat island effect to thrive in colder climates. It has also become common in other continents, where it can benefit by competitive release from its pests and predators.

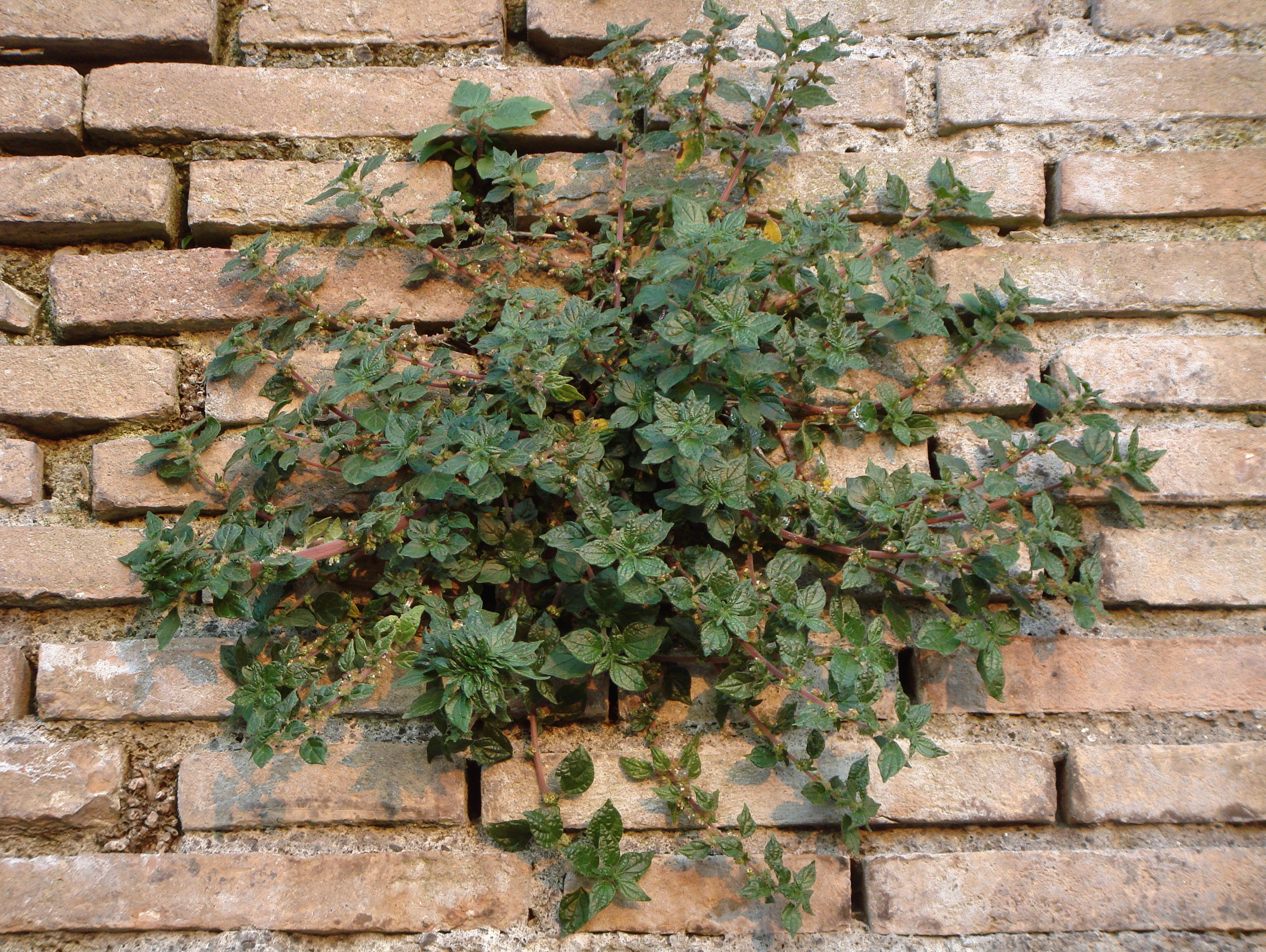
Spreading pellitory often grows from the gaps between bricks in a wall

In an urban landscape its main habitat is at the base of walls, where there is increased dampness, light shade and protection from trampling. It grows on bare soil or in the gap at the edge of the pavement and it is tolerant of light salinity, so it can occur in coastal towns and beside roads that are treated with salt. Plants are also found in gaps in the mortar between bricks or stones of older or damp walls, on shingle, and at the bottom of hedges. Plant density is highest in old town centres, thinning out in the suburbs until it becomes virtually absent from the open countryside. This is presumably because it is highly palatable to livestock. It grows in conditions that few other plants can tolerate and, as a consequence, it is found in very species-poor communities, often with no other associates whatsoever.

In sheltered places, spreading pellitory is an evergreen plant which typically produces smaller leaves to survive the winter (in the north) or the summer months (in warmer countries), or it dies back to a dense tangle of woody stems in less hospitable spots. It can be found in flower at any time of year, but the main flowering seasons are the autumn and spring in the Mediterranean region, or summer in northern Europe. Flowering is strongly influenced by aspect (south-facing walls in the northern hemisphere), temperature (best in warmer countries) and climate change (increased flowering in a warming environment).

The British National Vegetation Classification gives Parietaria diffusa (i.e. P. judaica) its own phytosociological community, OV41, which occurs on walls or coastal cliffs. The OV41a wall community is rather species-poor, with typically only about 7 other plants present in a sample, most commonly the mosses Homalothecium sericeum and Tortula muralis. The OV41b coastal community, however, has an average of 17 species per sample, including red fescue and wild carrot. It can also contain several rare species such as wild cabbage.

In continental Europe, the Parietanetalia community of old city walls is considered an important refuge for endangered species.

Spreading pellitory is tolerant of the high levels of heavy metal pollution caused by traffic in the urban environment. Metals such as lead, cadmium, copper and zinc accumulate within its tissues, and have been shown to cause increased pollen production.

Its Ellenberg values in central Europe are L = 6, F = 7, R = 8, N = 7, and S = 1, which show that it favours damp, reasonably sunny places on slightly alkaline soils and rich fertility, and that it can occur in slightly brackish situations.

This species is wind pollinated. Seeds are adhesive and transported by insects as well as other animals, people and machines.

The larvae of the red admiral butterfly (Vanessa atalanta) and the Bloxworth snout moth (Hypena obsitalis) feed on pellitories, including spreading pelltiory, as do several species of aphid, most notably Aphis parietariae.

== Uses and effects ==
The pollen of spreading pellitory is one of the leading causes of respiratory allergies (asthma and rhinitis) in the Mediterranean region, particularly at peak flowering times in the spring and autumn. One study estimated that the huge population of pellitory in a city in Greece could produce as many as 5.4 billion pollen grains per square metre during the spring months, causing many medical problems.

It has been established in Australia since 1902 or earlier, especially in Sydney, Melbourne and Fremantle, where it is considered a noxious weed. Control is effected by the application of glyphosate, although it can grow back quickly from the persistent soil seed bank.

In herbal medicine it was supposed to be efficacious against kidney and bladder stones, presumably because its roots appear to be splitting stone walls. The celebrated herbalist of the early 20th century Maud Grieve considered that its "action upon the urinary calculus is perhaps more marked than any other simple agent at present employed". Some Romani people apparently use it to treat sores, ulcers and piles.

Some authors consider that the plant listed by the Ancient Greek herbalist Dioscorides as Helxine is spreading pellitory. The description seems quite apt: "helxine grows in mounds and walls. It has thin little stalks, somewhat red, rough leaves similar to mercury; and around the stalks (as it were) sharp little seeds, catching hold of cloths." He considered it to be useful against all type of inflammation, oedema, and for many other purposes. Fifteen hundred years later the English herbalist Nicholas Culpeper gave a similar description but with the introduction of some errors such as opposite leaves, and considered it a useful antidiuretic and general cure-all.
