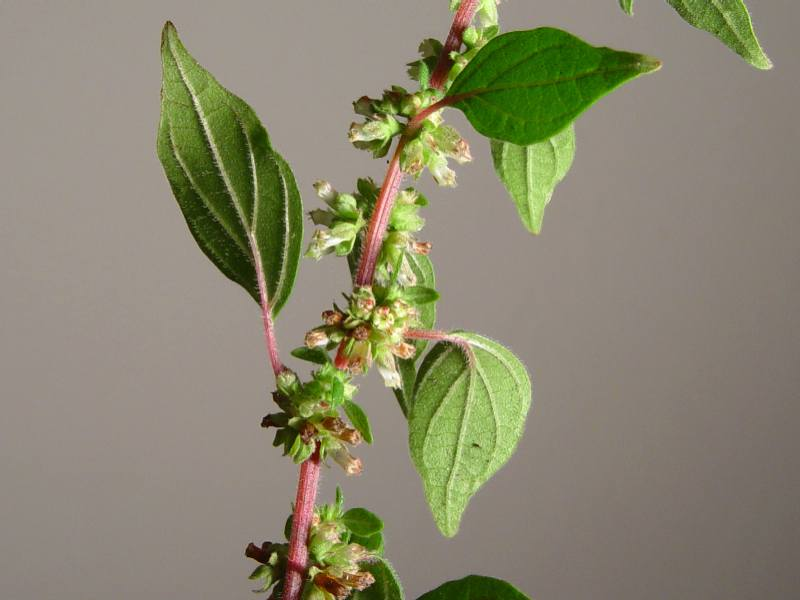
- Parietaria judaica

Scientific classification
- Kingdom: Plantae
- Clade: Embryophytes
- Clade: Tracheophytes
- Clade: Spermatophytes
- Clade: Angiosperms
- Clade: Eudicots
- Clade: Rosids
- Order: Rosales
- Family: Urticaceae
- Genus: Parietaria; L.

Species
- See text

= Parietaria =

Genus of flowering plants

Parietaria is a genus of flowering plants in the family Urticaceae, native to temperate and tropical regions across the world.

They are annual or perennial herbaceous plants growing to 20–80 cm tall, with green or pink stems. The leaves are alternate, simple, entire, often with a cluster of small leaves in their axils. Individual flowers are bisexual or unisexual, produced in clusters of three to many together in the leaf axils. Plants have either bisexual flowers or both staminate ("male") and carpellate ("female") flowers. The fruit is a small dry achene.

== Species ==
As of November 2013, The Plant List accepted only 10 species:

- Parietaria cretica L.
- Parietaria debilis G.Forst. (syn. Parietaria micrantha Ledeb.)
- Parietaria floridana Nutt.
- Parietaria judaica L. (syn. Parietaria diffusa Mert. & W.D.J.Koch)
- Parietaria lusitanica L.
- Parietaria macrophylla B.L. Rob. & Greenm.
- Parietaria mauritanica Durieu
- Parietaria officinalis L.
- Parietaria pensylvanica Muhl. ex Willd.
- Parietaria praetermissa B.D. Hinton

Names which The Plant List did not accept but regarded as unresolved as of November 2013 include:

- Parietaria australis (Nees) Blume
- Parietaria cardiostegia Greuter
- Parietaria filamentosa Webb & Berthel.
- Parietaria hespera B.D.Hinton
- Parietaria laxiflora Engl.
- Parietaria ruwenzoriensis Cortesi

Other species have been moved to different genera:

- Parietaria alsinifolia Delile = Freirea alsinaefolia (Delile) Gaudich.

Several species can be weeds; the Mediterranean species P. judaica is widely naturalised in the Americas, while the American P. pensylvanica is conversely naturalised in Europe.
