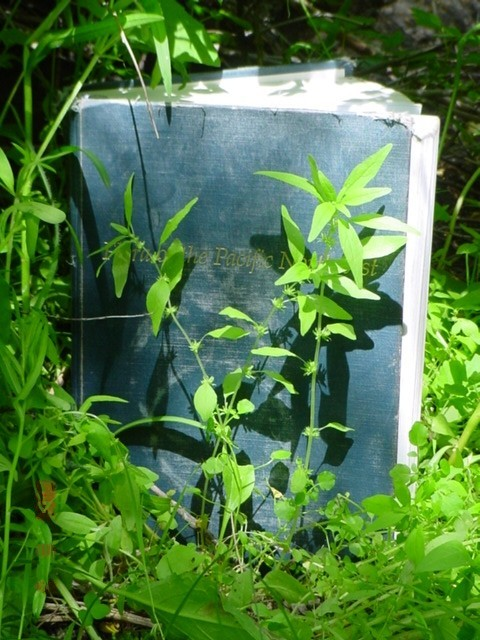

Scientific classification
- Kingdom: Plantae
- Clade: Embryophytes
- Clade: Tracheophytes
- Clade: Spermatophytes
- Clade: Angiosperms
- Clade: Eudicots
- Clade: Rosids
- Order: Rosales
- Family: Urticaceae
- Genus: Parietaria
- Species: P. pensylvanica

Binomial name
- Parietaria pensylvanica Willd.

= Parietaria pensylvanica =

Species of flowering plant

Parietaria pensylvanica, commonly called Pennsylvania pellitory, is a species of flowering plant in the nettle family. It is native to much of North America including every province in Canada except the Maritimes and Newfoundland and Labrador, Yukon Territory, every state in the United States except Alaska and Hawaii, plus northern Mexico. It is typically found in circumneutral or basic soils, in natural habitats such as calcareous cliffs and barrens, and in rich floodplains. It is also found disturbed areas.

It is an annual herb growing decumbent or erect to a maximum height near 0.5 m (1 ft 8 in). The alternately arranged leaves are lance-shaped or oval with a pointed tip and measure up to 3 cm (1.2 in) in length. The inflorescence is a cluster of flowers emerging from the leaf axils. The flower lacks petals but it has tiny pointed reddish brown sepals.

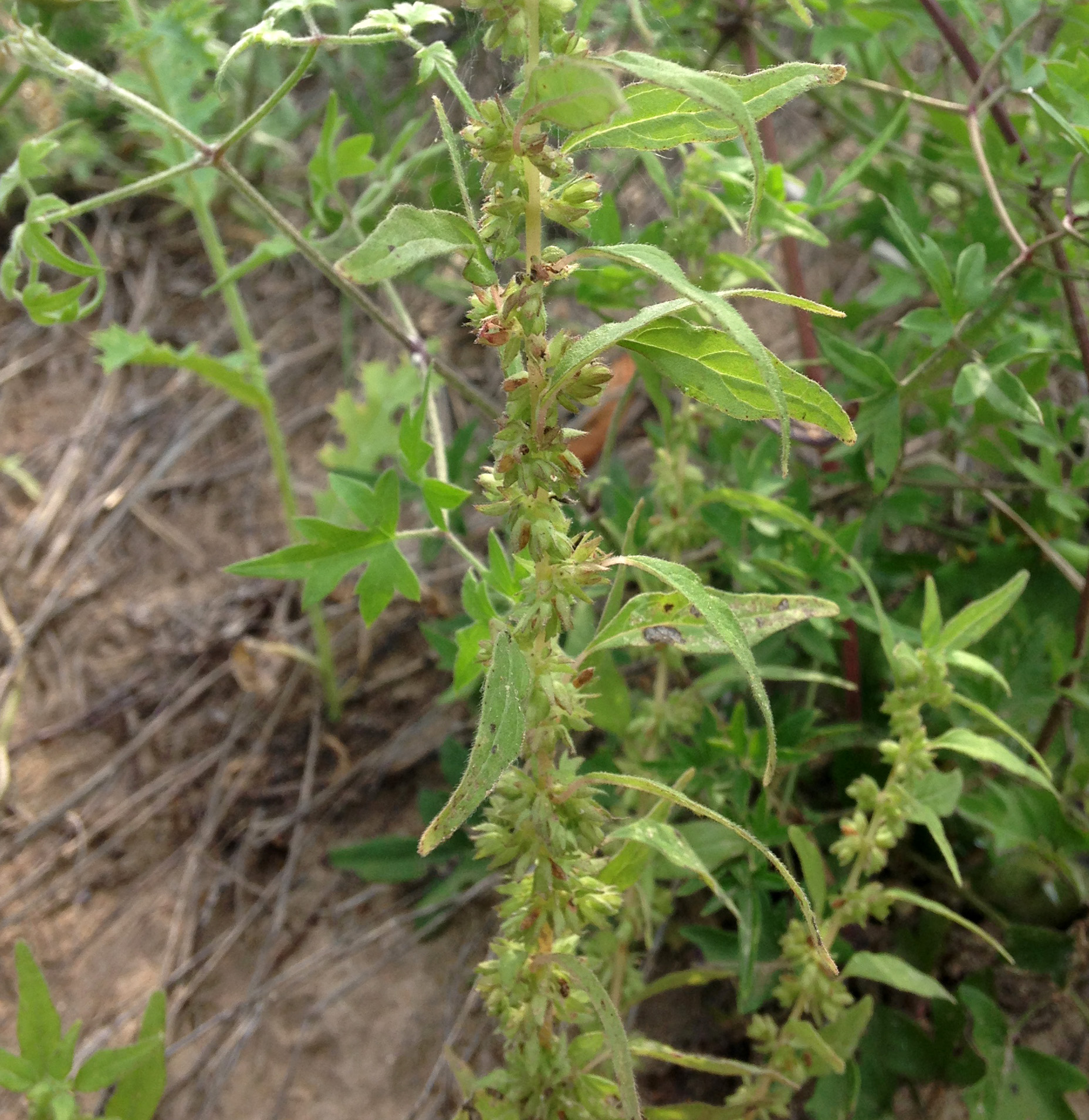
Detail of inflorescence
