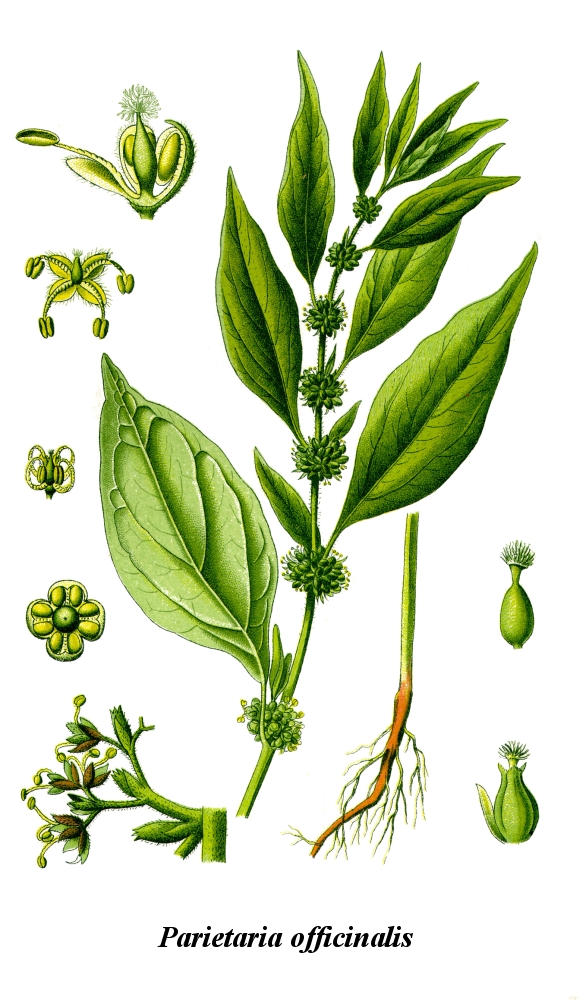

Scientific classification
- Kingdom: Plantae
- Clade: Embryophytes
- Clade: Tracheophytes
- Clade: Angiosperms
- Clade: Eudicots
- Clade: Rosids
- Order: Rosales
- Family: Urticaceae
- Genus: Parietaria
- Species: P. officinalis

Binomial name
- Parietaria officinalis L.

= Parietaria officinalis =

Species of flowering plant

Parietaria officinalis, the eastern pellitory-of-the-wall, also known as upright pellitory and lichwort, is a plant of the nettle family. Its leaves, however, are non-stinging. The plant grows on rubbish and on walls, hence the name.

The pollen is a cause of allergy.

== Uses ==
It was once used in the making of certain metheglins.

== Chemistry ==
The leaves and flowers of P. officinalis contain the flavonoids kaempferol-3-bioside, the 3-glucosides and 3-rutinosides of quercetin, kaempferol and isorhamnetin, 3-sophorosides of quercetin and kaempferol and 3-neohesperosides of kaempferol and isorhamnetin. They also contain caffeoylmalic and two pyrrole acids.

== See also ==
It is in a different family from Anacyclus pyrethrum, also called pellitory.
