= Hans Rebel =

Austrian entomologist (1861–1940)

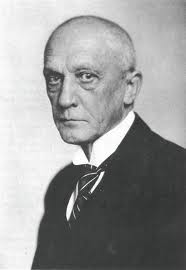
- Born: 2 September 1861; Hietzing, Austrian Empire
- Died: 19 May 1940 (aged 78); Vienna, Austria
- Citizenship: Austrian
- Scientific career
- Fields: Entomology (Lepidoptera)

Hans Rebel (2 September 1861 – 19 May 1940) was an Austrian entomologist who specialised in Lepidoptera.

Rebel, who had an early interest in natural history and butterflies, first became a lawyer. He devoted his spare time to studying Lepidoptera and established the entomological section of the Botanical and Zoological Society of Vienna. He succeeded Alois Friedrich Rogenhofer (1831–1897) as keeper of the Lepidoptera collection of the Naturhistorisches Museum in Vienna, a post he held from 1897 to 1932. Rebel enriched the collections and as a grand voyageur, made many collecting trips in Austro-Hungary and five trips in the Balkans. He directed the Department of Zoology in 1923 and was the museum's director general in 1925.

He published more than 300 publications on Lepidoptera and a catalogue of Palearctic butterflies Otto Staudinger (1830–1900) - Catalog Lepidopteren des palaearctischen Faunengebietes. Friedlander. Berlin. 1901–1903. 1. Theil, S. I-XXXII, 1–411.

Hans Rebel described the African butterflies collected by Rudolf Grauer.

Vladimir Nabokov (1899–1977) included Rebel as a character in his short story "The Aurelian".

== Sources ==
- Nonveiller, G. (2001). Pioneers of the Research on the Insects of Dalmatia. Zagreb: Croatian Natural History Museum : p 390. ISBN 978-953-6645-04-6
- Johnson, Coates (1999). Nabokov's Blues: The Scientific Odyssey of a Literary Genius. New York: McGraw-Hill. : xii + p372 . ISBN 978-0-07-137330-2
- (in English) Muséum d’histoire naturelle de Vienne
