= List of moths of Australia (Epermeniidae) =

Partial list of Australian moths

This is a list of the Australian moth species of the family Epermeniidae. It also acts as an index to the species articles and forms part of the full List of moths of Australia.

== Epermeniinae ==
- Agiton idioptila Turner, 1926
- Epermenia commonella Gaedike, 1968
- Epermenia exilis Meyrick, 1897
- Epermenia tasmanica Gaedike, 1968
- Epermenia trileucota Meyrick, 1921
- Paraepermenia santaliella Gaedike, 1968

== Ochromolopinae ==
- Gnathifera acacivorella (Gaedike, 1968)
- Gnathifera aphronesa (Meyrick, 1897)
- Gnathifera australica (Gaedike, 1968)
- Gnathifera bidentata (Gaedike, 1968)
- Gnathifera bipunctata (Gaedike, 1968)
- Gnathifera eurybias (Meyrick, 1897)
- Gnathifera opsias (Meyrick, 1897)
- Gnathifera paraphronesa (Gaedike, 1968)
- Gnathifera paropsias (Gaedike, 1972)
- Gnathifera pseudaphronesa (Gaedike, 1972)
- Gnathifera queenslandi (Gaedike, 1968)
- Gnathifera uptonella (Gaedike, 1968)
- Ochromolopis cornutifera (Gaedike, 1968)

The following species belongs to the subfamily Ochromolopinae, but has not been assigned to a genus yet. Given here is the original name given to the species when it was first described:

- Epermenia epispora Meyrick, 1897
- Epermenia xeranta Meyrick, 1917
