= Epermenia sinica =

Scientific classification
- Kingdom: Animalia
- Phylum: Arthropoda
- Clade: Pancrustacea
- Class: Insecta
- Order: Lepidoptera
- Family: Epermeniidae
- Genus: Epermenia
- Species: E. sinica

Binomial name
- Epermenia sinica Gaedike, 1996

Species of moth

Epermenia sinica is a moth in the family Epermeniidae. It was described by Reinhard Gaedike in 1996. It is found in Yunnan, China.

The wingspan is about 22 mm. Adults are similar to Epermenia nepalica but can be distinguished by the genitalia.
