= Epermenia petrusellus =

Scientific classification
- Kingdom: Animalia
- Phylum: Arthropoda
- Clade: Pancrustacea
- Class: Insecta
- Order: Lepidoptera
- Family: Epermeniidae
- Genus: Epermenia
- Species: E. petrusellus

Binomial name
- Epermenia petrusellus (Heylaerts, 1883)

Synonyms
- Chauliodus petrusellus Heylaerts, 1883; Epermenia petrusella; Epermenia kroneella Rebel 1903; Epermenia notodoxa Gozmány 1952

Species of moth

Epermenia petrusellus is a moth of the family Epermeniidae. It is found in France, Austria, the Czech Republic, Slovakia, Croatia, Hungary, Romania and Greece. There are also records from the Kaluga Oblast, Russia, and from western Ukraine, but these records are doubtful and may be a misidentifications of Epermenia falciformis.

The wingspan is about 15 mm.

The larvae feed on Peucedanum alsaticum and Peucedanum montanum.
