= O. bidentata =

O. bidentata may refer to:

- Ochromolopis bidentata, two different species of fringe tufted moth now known respectively as Epermenia bidentata (Diakonoff, 1955) and Gnathifera bidentella. The name was preoccupied by Diakonoff, 1955 when the species now-known as G. bidentella was first described by Gaedike, 1981, as Ochromolopis bidentata.
- Odontopera bidentata, a geometer moth
- Olethreutes bidentata, a tortrix moth
- Osmia bidentata, a mason bee
