= Epermenia infracta =

Scientific classification
- Kingdom: Animalia
- Phylum: Arthropoda
- Clade: Pancrustacea
- Class: Insecta
- Order: Lepidoptera
- Family: Epermeniidae
- Genus: Epermenia
- Species: E. infracta

Binomial name
- Epermenia infracta Braun, 1926

Synonyms
- Epermenia strictelloides Gaedike, 1977

Species of moth

Epermenia infracta is a moth in the family Epermeniidae. It was described by Annette Frances Braun in 1926. It is found in North America, where it has been recorded from Alberta, Colorado, Oregon and California.

== Taxonomy ==
The species was previously treated as a synonym of Epermenia strictella.
