= Epermenia cicutaella =

Scientific classification
- Kingdom: Animalia
- Phylum: Arthropoda
- Clade: Pancrustacea
- Class: Insecta
- Order: Lepidoptera
- Family: Epermeniidae
- Genus: Epermenia
- Species: E. cicutaella

Binomial name
- Epermenia cicutaella Kearfott, 1903

Synonyms
- Epermenia alameda Braun, 1923

Species of moth

Epermenia cicutaella is a moth in the family Epermeniidae. It was described by William D. Kearfott in 1903. It is found in North America, where it has been recorded from California, Delaware, Kentucky, Michigan, New Brunswick, New Hampshire, New Jersey, New York, Nova Scotia, Oregon, Quebec, and Wyoming.

The larvae feed on the flowers and fruits of Cicuta maculata. The species overwinters as an adult.
