= Epermenia symmorias =

Scientific classification
- Kingdom: Animalia
- Phylum: Arthropoda
- Clade: Pancrustacea
- Class: Insecta
- Order: Lepidoptera
- Family: Epermeniidae
- Genus: Epermenia
- Species: E. symmorias

Binomial name
- Epermenia symmorias Meyrick, 1923

Species of moth

Epermenia symmorias is a moth in the family Epermeniidae. It was described by Edward Meyrick in 1923. It is found in Fiji.

The wingspan is about 10 mm. The forewings are grey whitish speckled with grey and with a black dot beneath the fold at one-fifth. There is a narrow rather dark brown antemedian fascia rather inwards-oblique from the costa, dark fuscous towards the costa, beyond this, the costal third of the wing is dark fuscous and the median third rather dark brown. The dorsal third is irrorated (sprinkled) with dark grey with a projection into the brown area at three-fourths, including a black dot. A fine oblique whitish strigula runs from the costa towards the apex and there is a fine blackish dash before the apex. The hindwings are grey.
