= Epermenia farreni =

Scarce lance-wing

Scientific classification
- Kingdom: Animalia
- Phylum: Arthropoda
- Clade: Pancrustacea
- Class: Insecta
- Order: Lepidoptera
- Family: Epermeniidae
- Genus: Epermenia
- Species: E. farreni

Binomial name
- Epermenia farreni (Walsingham, 1894)

Synonyms
- Cataplectica farreni Walsingham, 1894

Species of moth

Epermenia farreni, the scarce lance-wing, is a moth of the family Epermeniidae found in Asia and Europe. It was first described by Thomas de Grey, 6th Baron Walsingham in 1894 from a specimen found in Cambridge, England.

== Description ==
The wingspan is 9–10 mm and can be found in June and July.

Ova are laid, probably on the seeds, of wild parsnip (Pastinaca sativa) in June and July. The larvae feed within individual seed capsules in August and September. The deep yellow pupa can be found on the ground within a flimsy cocoon in September, overwintering until the summer.

== Distribution ==
It is found in Great Britain, Sweden, Slovakia, northern Russia, Kazakhstan and Kyrgyzstan.
