= Epermenia uedai =

Scientific classification
- Kingdom: Animalia
- Phylum: Arthropoda
- Clade: Pancrustacea
- Class: Insecta
- Order: Lepidoptera
- Family: Epermeniidae
- Genus: Epermenia
- Species: E. uedai

Binomial name
- Epermenia uedai Kuroko & Gaedike, 2006

Species of moth

Epermenia uedai is a moth of the family Epermeniidae. It is found in Japan (Kyushu).

The length of the forewings is about 5.7 millimetres (0.22 in).

== Etymology ==
The species is named in honour of Dr. Tatsuya Ueda, who collected the holotype.
