= Epermenia leucomantis =

Scientific classification
- Kingdom: Animalia
- Phylum: Arthropoda
- Clade: Pancrustacea
- Class: Insecta
- Order: Lepidoptera
- Family: Epermeniidae
- Genus: Epermenia
- Species: E. leucomantis

Binomial name
- Epermenia leucomantis Meyrick, 1917

Species of moth

Epermenia leucomantis is a moth in the family Epermeniidae. It was described by Edward Meyrick in 1917. It is found in Assam, India.

The wingspan is about 8 mm. The forewings are grey whitish irrorated (sprinkled) with blackish and suffused with elongate white spots on the costa at one-fourth and the middle, and smaller spots on the dorsum at one-fourth and beyond the middle. The costa is suffused with blackish towards the base, and a spot of blackish suffusion between the white spots. The apical two-fifths of the wing is grey irrorated with black, with some scattered whitish scales. The hindwings are dark fuscous with a white spot on the costa at two-thirds.
