= Epermenia parasitica =

Scientific classification
- Kingdom: Animalia
- Phylum: Arthropoda
- Clade: Pancrustacea
- Class: Insecta
- Order: Lepidoptera
- Family: Epermeniidae
- Genus: Epermenia
- Species: E. parasitica

Binomial name
- Epermenia parasitica Meyrick, 1930

Species of moth

Epermenia parasitica is a moth in the family Epermeniidae. It was described by Edward Meyrick in 1930. It is found on Java in Indonesia.

Its wingspan is 8–9 mm.
