= Epermenia ozodes =

Scientific classification
- Kingdom: Animalia
- Phylum: Arthropoda
- Clade: Pancrustacea
- Class: Insecta
- Order: Lepidoptera
- Family: Epermeniidae
- Genus: Epermenia
- Species: E. ozodes

Binomial name
- Epermenia ozodes Meyrick, 1917

Species of moth

Epermenia ozodes is a moth in the family Epermeniidae. It was described by Edward Meyrick in 1917. It is found in Sri Lanka.

The wingspan is about 12 mm. The forewings are fuscous, suffusedly irrorated (sprinkled) with dark fuscous and without defined markings. There are three dorsal projections of dark fuscous scales. The hindwings are dark grey, with a brush of scales beneath the costa before the middle.
