= Epermenia imperialella =

Scientific classification
- Kingdom: Animalia
- Phylum: Arthropoda
- Clade: Pancrustacea
- Class: Insecta
- Order: Lepidoptera
- Family: Epermeniidae
- Genus: Epermenia
- Species: E. imperialella

Binomial name
- Epermenia imperialella Busck, 1906

Species of moth

Epermenia imperialella is a moth in the family Epermeniidae. It was described by August Busck in 1906. It is found in North America, where it has been recorded from Manitoba, Alberta, Iowa and Pennsylvania.

The wingspan is 13–18 mm. The forewings are light yellow, overlaid with reddish ochreous on the costal and apical part. On the middle of the wing is an ill-defined broad oblique darker greyish-ochreous fascia, widest at the costal edge, gradually narrowing to the dorsal edge, which it reaches at the basal third. It is there continued into a dark ochreous dorsal scale tuft. The reddish colouration increases in intensity towards the apex. The hindwings are dark bronzy fuscous.

The larvae probably feed on Apiaceae species.
