= Parochromolopis syncrata =

Scientific classification
- Kingdom: Animalia
- Phylum: Arthropoda
- Class: Insecta
- Order: Lepidoptera
- Family: Epermeniidae
- Genus: Parochromolopis
- Species: P. syncrata

Binomial name
- Parochromolopis syncrata (Meyrick, 1921)

Synonyms
- Epermenia syncrata Meyrick, 1921

Species of moth

Parochromolopis syncrata is a moth in the family Epermeniidae. It was described by Edward Meyrick in 1921. It is found in Brazil and Peru.

The wingspan is 10–11 mm. The forewings are pale brownish ochreous, more or less suffusedly irrorated (sprinkled) with dark grey, and the apical three-fifths irregularly suffused with dark brown. There are spots of blackish irroration in the disc beyond the middle and at two-fifths, as well as a small blackish apical spot, edged anteriorly with whitish suffusion. The hindwings are dark grey.
