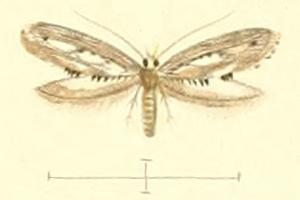

Scientific classification
- Kingdom: Animalia
- Phylum: Arthropoda
- Clade: Pancrustacea
- Class: Insecta
- Order: Lepidoptera
- Family: Epermeniidae
- Genus: Epermenia
- Species: E. ochreomaculellus

Binomial name
- Epermenia ochreomaculellus (Millière, 1854)

Synonyms
- Chauliodus ochreomaculellus Millière, 1854; Epermenia ochreomaculella; Epermenia prohaskaella Schawerda, 1921

= Epermenia ochreomaculellus =

Species of moth

Epermenia ochreomaculellus is a moth of the family Epermeniidae. It is found from the Iberian Peninsula to Bulgaria and the Caucasus, as well as from Lebanon to Mongolia.

== Subspecies ==
- Epermenia ochreomaculellus ochreomaculellus (Iberian Peninsula to Bulgaria and the Caucasus)
- Epermenia ochreomaculellus asiatica Gaedike, 1979 (Near East: Lebanon to Mongolia)
