= Epermenia sinjovi =

Scientific classification
- Kingdom: Animalia
- Phylum: Arthropoda
- Clade: Pancrustacea
- Class: Insecta
- Order: Lepidoptera
- Family: Epermeniidae
- Genus: Epermenia
- Species: E. sinjovi

Binomial name
- Epermenia sinjovi Gaedike, 1993

Synonyms
- Epermenia (Calotripis) sinjovi

Species of moth

Epermenia sinjovi is a moth of the family Epermeniidae. It is found in the Russian Far East (southern Primor’je, Kamchatka), south-eastern Siberia, the southern Kuril Islands, the Baikal region (Burjatija) and Japan (Hokkaido, Honshu).

The length of the forewings is 5–6 mm. Adults are variable, with four described colour forms.

The larvae feed on Angelica species, including Angelica pubescens and Angelica ursina.
