= Sinicaepermenia sauropophaga =

Scientific classification
- Kingdom: Animalia
- Phylum: Arthropoda
- Clade: Pancrustacea
- Class: Insecta
- Order: Lepidoptera
- Family: Epermeniidae
- Genus: Sinicaepermenia
- Species: S. sauropophaga

Binomial name
- Sinicaepermenia sauropophaga Gaedike, Kuroko & Funahashi, 2008

Species of moth

Sinicaepermenia sauropophaga is a moth in the family Epermeniidae. It was described by Reinhard Gaedike, Hiroshi Kuroko and Katsuyuki Funahashi in 2008. It is found in Thailand.

The length of the forewings is 4-4.5 mm for males and 4.8–5 mm for females.
