= Epermenia trifilata =

Scientific classification
- Kingdom: Animalia
- Phylum: Arthropoda
- Clade: Pancrustacea
- Class: Insecta
- Order: Lepidoptera
- Family: Epermeniidae
- Genus: Epermenia
- Species: E. trifilata

Binomial name
- Epermenia trifilata Meyrick, 1932

Species of moth

Epermenia trifilata is a moth in the family Epermeniidae. It was described by Edward Meyrick in 1932. It is found on Java in Indonesia.
