= Epermenia ellochistis =

Scientific classification
- Kingdom: Animalia
- Phylum: Arthropoda
- Clade: Pancrustacea
- Class: Insecta
- Order: Lepidoptera
- Family: Epermeniidae
- Genus: Epermenia
- Species: E. ellochistis

Binomial name
- Epermenia ellochistis Meyrick, 1917

Species of moth

Epermenia ellochistis is a moth in the family Epermeniidae. It was first described by Edward Meyrick in 1917. It is found in Assam, India.

== Description ==
The wingspan is approximately 13 mm. The forewings are pale brownish, sprinkled with dark grey and with an oblique brown spot irrorated (sprinkled) with blackish from the dorsum before the middle, as well as an elongate blotch of blackish irroration extending along the costa from before the middle to two-thirds. There is some ochreous-brown longitudinal suffusion between the posterior portion of this and the dorsum. A second discal stigma is rather large, black and pale-circled. There is some brown suffusion towards the middle of the termen, as well as a patch of blackish irroration towards the apex, and a blackish dot at the apex. A strong triangular projection of blackish-tipped scales is found at one-third of the dorsum and three smaller projections between this and the tornus, as well as some scales at the tornus. The hindwings are grey, but paler anteriorly.
