= Epermenia falcata =

Scientific classification
- Kingdom: Animalia
- Phylum: Arthropoda
- Clade: Pancrustacea
- Class: Insecta
- Order: Lepidoptera
- Family: Epermeniidae
- Genus: Epermenia
- Species: E. falcata

Binomial name
- Epermenia falcata Gaedike, 2008

Species of moth

Epermenia falcata is a moth in the family Epermeniidae. It was described by Reinhard Gaedike in 2008. It is found in North America, where it has been recorded from the state of Washington.
