= Epermenia oriplanta =

Scientific classification
- Kingdom: Animalia
- Phylum: Arthropoda
- Clade: Pancrustacea
- Class: Insecta
- Order: Lepidoptera
- Family: Epermeniidae
- Genus: Epermenia
- Species: E. oriplanta

Binomial name
- Epermenia oriplanta Bradley, 1965

Species of moth

Epermenia oriplanta is a moth in the family Epermeniidae. It was described by John David Bradley in 1965. It is found in Uganda.
