= Epermenia shimekii =

Scientific classification
- Kingdom: Animalia
- Phylum: Arthropoda
- Clade: Pancrustacea
- Class: Insecta
- Order: Lepidoptera
- Family: Epermeniidae
- Genus: Epermenia
- Species: E. shimekii

Binomial name
- Epermenia shimekii Kuroko & Gaedike, 2006

Species of moth

Epermenia shimekii is a moth of the family Epermeniidae. It is endemic to Japan with records from Honshu (Gunma and Nagano Prefectures) and Yakushima.

The length of the forewings is 7–7.5 millimetres (0.28–0.30 in).

== Etymology ==
The species is named in honour of Mr. Shinji Shimeki, who collected the holotype.
