= Epermenia pulchokicola =

Scientific classification
- Kingdom: Animalia
- Phylum: Arthropoda
- Clade: Pancrustacea
- Class: Insecta
- Order: Lepidoptera
- Family: Epermeniidae
- Genus: Epermenia
- Species: E. pulchokicola

Binomial name
- Epermenia pulchokicola Gaedike, 2010

Species of moth

Epermenia pulchokicola is a moth in the family Epermeniidae. It was described by Reinhard Gaedike in 2010. It is found in Nepal.
