= Epermenia fuscomaculata =

Scientific classification
- Kingdom: Animalia
- Phylum: Arthropoda
- Clade: Pancrustacea
- Class: Insecta
- Order: Lepidoptera
- Family: Epermeniidae
- Genus: Epermenia
- Species: E. fuscomaculata

Binomial name
- Epermenia fuscomaculata Kuroko & Gaedike, 2006

Species of moth

Epermenia fuscomaculata is a moth of the family Epermeniidae. It is found in Japan (Ryukyu Islands: Yakushima, Amami, Okinawa) and Taiwan.

The length of the forewings is 4–5.5 millimetres (0.16–0.22 in).
