= Epermenia hamata =

Scientific classification
- Kingdom: Animalia
- Phylum: Arthropoda
- Clade: Pancrustacea
- Class: Insecta
- Order: Lepidoptera
- Family: Epermeniidae
- Genus: Epermenia
- Species: E. hamata

Binomial name
- Epermenia hamata Gaedike, 2013

Species of moth

Epermenia hamata is a moth in the family Epermeniidae. It was described by Reinhard Gaedike in 2013. It lives in South Africa, and was recorded from KwaZulu-Natal.
