= Epermenia ergastica =

Scientific classification
- Kingdom: Animalia
- Phylum: Arthropoda
- Clade: Pancrustacea
- Class: Insecta
- Order: Lepidoptera
- Family: Epermeniidae
- Genus: Epermenia
- Species: E. ergastica

Binomial name
- Epermenia ergastica Meyrick, 1917

Species of moth

Epermenia ergastica is a moth in the family Epermeniidae. It was described by Edward Meyrick in 1917. It is found in Indonesia, where it has been recorded from the Tenimbar Islands.

The wingspan is about 10 mm. The forewings are pale grey irrorated (sprinkled) with dark fuscous. The discal stigmata is blackish, remote and the second is beyond two-thirds. There is a dark fuscous apical dot, edged anteriorly by a cloudy pale mark preceded by some dark fuscous suffusion. The hindwings are grey, but paler anteriorly.
