= Epermenia canadensis =

Scientific classification
- Kingdom: Animalia
- Phylum: Arthropoda
- Clade: Pancrustacea
- Class: Insecta
- Order: Lepidoptera
- Family: Epermeniidae
- Genus: Epermenia
- Species: E. canadensis

Binomial name
- Epermenia canadensis Gaedike, 2008

Species of moth

Epermenia canadensis is a moth in the family Epermeniidae. It was described by Reinhard Gaedike in 2008. It is found in North America, where it has been recorded from Alberta.
