= Epermenia pseudofuscomaculata =

Scientific classification
- Kingdom: Animalia
- Phylum: Arthropoda
- Clade: Pancrustacea
- Class: Insecta
- Order: Lepidoptera
- Family: Epermeniidae
- Genus: Epermenia
- Species: E. pseudofuscomaculata

Binomial name
- Epermenia pseudofuscomaculata Kuroko & Gaedike, 2006

Species of moth

Epermenia pseudofuscomaculata is a moth of the family Epermeniidae. It is endemic to the Ryukyu Islands, Japan, with records from Okinawa Island and Iriomote Island.

The length of the forewings is 4–5 millimetres (0.16–0.20 in).
