= Epermenia macescens =

Scientific classification
- Kingdom: Animalia
- Phylum: Arthropoda
- Clade: Pancrustacea
- Class: Insecta
- Order: Lepidoptera
- Family: Epermeniidae
- Genus: Epermenia
- Species: E. macescens

Binomial name
- Epermenia macescens Meyrick, 1917

Species of moth

Epermenia macescens is a moth in the family Epermeniidae. It was described by Edward Meyrick in 1917. It is found in India.

The wingspan is about 10 mm. The forewings are brownish grey, irregularly irrorated (sprinkled) with dark grey. The discal stigmata are small, black and widely remote, with some longitudinal ochreous-brownish suffusion between these. The hindwings are light grey.
