= Epermenia devotella =

Scientific classification
- Kingdom: Animalia
- Phylum: Arthropoda
- Clade: Pancrustacea
- Class: Insecta
- Order: Lepidoptera
- Family: Epermeniidae
- Genus: Epermenia
- Species: E. devotella

Binomial name
- Epermenia devotella (Heyden, 1863)

Synonyms
- Oecophora devotella Heyden, 1863

Species of moth

Epermenia devotella is a moth of the family Epermeniidae. It is found in France, Germany, Austria, Italy, Slovenia, Switzerland and southern Russia.

The larvae feed on the seeds of Angelica (including Angelica sylvestris) and Heracleum species.
