= Parochromolopis gielisi =

Scientific classification
- Kingdom: Animalia
- Phylum: Arthropoda
- Clade: Pancrustacea
- Class: Insecta
- Order: Lepidoptera
- Family: Epermeniidae
- Genus: Parochromolopis
- Species: P. gielisi

Binomial name
- Parochromolopis gielisi Gaedike, 2010

Species of moth

Parochromolopis gielisi is a moth in the family Epermeniidae. It was described by Reinhard Gaedike in 2010. It is found in Argentina.
