= Epermenia theimeri =

Scientific classification
- Kingdom: Animalia
- Phylum: Arthropoda
- Clade: Pancrustacea
- Class: Insecta
- Order: Lepidoptera
- Family: Epermeniidae
- Genus: Epermenia
- Species: E. theimeri

Binomial name
- Epermenia theimeri Gaedike, 2001

Species of moth

Epermenia theimeri is a moth of the family Epermeniidae. It is found in Italy.
