= Parochromolopis psittacanthus =

Scientific classification
- Kingdom: Animalia
- Phylum: Arthropoda
- Clade: Pancrustacea
- Class: Insecta
- Order: Lepidoptera
- Family: Epermeniidae
- Genus: Parochromolopis
- Species: P. psittacanthus

Binomial name
- Parochromolopis psittacanthus Heppner, 1980

Species of moth

Parochromolopis psittacanthus is a moth in the family Epermeniidae. It was described by John B. Heppner in 1980. It is found in Costa Rica.

The larvae feed on Psittacanthus calyculatus. They bore in the fruits of their host plant.
