= Epermenia stolidota =

Scientific classification
- Kingdom: Animalia
- Phylum: Arthropoda
- Clade: Pancrustacea
- Class: Insecta
- Order: Lepidoptera
- Family: Epermeniidae
- Genus: Epermenia
- Species: E. stolidota

Binomial name
- Epermenia stolidota (Meyrick, 1917)

Synonyms
- Acanthedra stolidota Meyrick, 1917

Species of moth

Epermenia stolidota is a moth in the family Epermeniidae. It was described by Edward Meyrick in 1917. It is found in North America, where it has been recorded from Wyoming, Colorado, Utah and Arizona.

The wingspan is 20–22 mm. The forewings are whitish ocherous, between the veins more ocherous and irrorated (speckled) with light gray and a few blackish scales. The stigmata are small and black and the plical elongate, very obliquely beyond the first discal. The hindwings are light gray.
