= Epermenia ruwenzorica =

Scientific classification
- Kingdom: Animalia
- Phylum: Arthropoda
- Clade: Pancrustacea
- Class: Insecta
- Order: Lepidoptera
- Family: Epermeniidae
- Genus: Epermenia
- Species: E. ruwenzorica

Binomial name
- Epermenia ruwenzorica Gaedike, 2013

Species of moth

Epermenia ruwenzorica is a moth in the family Epermeniidae. It was described by Reinhard Gaedike in 2013. It is found in Orientale Province of the Democratic Republic of the Congo.
