= Epermenia iniquellus =

Scientific classification
- Kingdom: Animalia
- Phylum: Arthropoda
- Clade: Pancrustacea
- Class: Insecta
- Order: Lepidoptera
- Family: Epermeniidae
- Genus: Epermenia
- Species: E. iniquellus

Binomial name
- Epermenia iniquellus (Wocke, 1867)

Synonyms
- Chauliodus iniquellus Wocke, 1867; Epermenia iniquella; Cataplectica kruegeriella Schawerda, 1921; Epermenia ochrodesma Meyrick, 1913

Species of moth

Epermenia iniquellus is a moth of the family Epermeniidae. It is found in Europe (from southern France to Greece, Poland and Ukraine) and from Turkey to Iran, Kazakhstan and Tajikistan.

The wingspan is 9.5–10 mm.

The larvae feed on Peucedanum officinale and Ferula caspica.
