= Epermenia dracontias =

Scientific classification
- Kingdom: Animalia
- Phylum: Arthropoda
- Clade: Pancrustacea
- Class: Insecta
- Order: Lepidoptera
- Family: Epermeniidae
- Genus: Epermenia
- Species: E. dracontias

Binomial name
- Epermenia dracontias Meyrick, 1917

Species of moth

Epermenia dracontias is a moth in the family Epermeniidae. It was described by Edward Meyrick in 1917. It is found in southern India.

The wingspan is about 14 mm. The forewings are grey, somewhat sprinkled with blackish and with a black streak along the basal fourth of the dorsum. There are several small spots of black irroration (sprinkles) along the costa and three small black spots circled with white placed in a longitudinal row in the disc from two-fifths to three-fourths. There is also a thick blackish longitudinal streak extending between and beyond these to near the apex between the first two, extended as a fascia to the costa and dorsum, this followed on the dorsum by a semioval white spot containing two black dots. There are strong dorsal projections of grey scales tipped with black before middle, at two-thirds and before the tornus. The hindwings are light grey.
