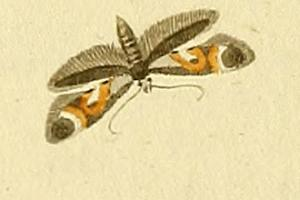

Scientific classification
- Kingdom: Animalia
- Phylum: Arthropoda
- Clade: Pancrustacea
- Class: Insecta
- Order: Lepidoptera
- Family: Epermeniidae
- Genus: Epermenia
- Species: E. pontificella

Binomial name
- Epermenia pontificella (Hübner, 1796)

Synonyms
- Tinea pontificella Hübner, 1796; Epermenia pontificellus

= Epermenia pontificella =

Species of moth

Epermenia pontificella is a moth of the family Epermeniidae. It is found in most of Europe and Asia Minor.

The larvae feed on Thesium montanum.
