= Epermenia bicornis =

Scientific classification
- Kingdom: Animalia
- Phylum: Arthropoda
- Clade: Pancrustacea
- Class: Insecta
- Order: Lepidoptera
- Family: Epermeniidae
- Genus: Epermenia
- Species: E. bicornis

Binomial name
- Epermenia bicornis Gaedike, 2004

Species of moth

Epermenia bicornis is a moth in the family Epermeniidae. It was described by Reinhard Gaedike in 2004. It is found in South Africa.
