= Epermenia conioptila =

Scientific classification
- Kingdom: Animalia
- Phylum: Arthropoda
- Clade: Pancrustacea
- Class: Insecta
- Order: Lepidoptera
- Family: Epermeniidae
- Genus: Epermenia
- Species: E. conioptila

Binomial name
- Epermenia conioptila Meyrick, 1921

Species of moth

Epermenia conioptila is a moth in the family Epermeniidae. It was described by Edward Meyrick in 1921. It is found in Kenya and South Africa.
