= Epermenia afghanistanella =

Scientific classification
- Kingdom: Animalia
- Phylum: Arthropoda
- Clade: Pancrustacea
- Class: Insecta
- Order: Lepidoptera
- Family: Epermeniidae
- Genus: Epermenia
- Species: E. afghanistanella

Binomial name
- Epermenia afghanistanella (Gaedike, 1971)

Synonyms
- Cataplectica afghanistanella Gaedike, 1971

Species of moth

Epermenia afghanistanella is a moth in the family Epermeniidae. It was described by Reinhard Gaedike in 1971. It is found in Afghanistan.
