= Epermenia californica =

Scientific classification
- Kingdom: Animalia
- Phylum: Arthropoda
- Clade: Pancrustacea
- Class: Insecta
- Order: Lepidoptera
- Family: Epermeniidae
- Genus: Epermenia
- Species: E. californica

Binomial name
- Epermenia californica Gaedike, 1977

Species of moth

Epermenia californica is a moth in the family Epermeniidae. It was described by Reinhard Gaedike in 1977. It is found in North America, where it has been recorded from California.
