= Epermenia griveaudi =

Scientific classification
- Kingdom: Animalia
- Phylum: Arthropoda
- Clade: Pancrustacea
- Class: Insecta
- Order: Lepidoptera
- Family: Epermeniidae
- Genus: Epermenia
- Species: E. griveaudi

Binomial name
- Epermenia griveaudi Gaedike, 2004

Species of moth

Epermenia griveaudi is a moth in the family Epermeniidae. It was described by Reinhard Gaedike in 2004. It is found on Madagascar.
