= Epermenia insularis =

Scientific classification
- Kingdom: Animalia
- Phylum: Arthropoda
- Clade: Pancrustacea
- Class: Insecta
- Order: Lepidoptera
- Family: Epermeniidae
- Genus: Epermenia
- Species: E. insularis

Binomial name
- Epermenia insularis Gaedike, 1979

Species of moth

Epermenia insularis is a moth in the family Epermeniidae. It was described by Reinhard Gaedike in 1979. It is found on Norfolk Island between Australia and New Zealand.
