= Epermenia orientalis =

Scientific classification
- Kingdom: Animalia
- Phylum: Arthropoda
- Clade: Pancrustacea
- Class: Insecta
- Order: Lepidoptera
- Family: Epermeniidae
- Genus: Epermenia
- Species: E. orientalis

Binomial name
- Epermenia orientalis Gaedike, 1966

Species of moth

Epermenia orientalis is a moth in the family Epermeniidae. It was described by Reinhard Gaedike in 1966. It is found in Arabia, Iraq, Afghanistan and Pakistan.
