= Epermenia gaedikei =

Scientific classification
- Kingdom: Animalia
- Phylum: Arthropoda
- Clade: Pancrustacea
- Class: Insecta
- Order: Lepidoptera
- Family: Epermeniidae
- Genus: Epermenia
- Species: E. gaedikei

Binomial name
- Epermenia gaedikei Budashkin, 2003

Synonyms
- Epermenia (Calotripis) gaedikei

Species of moth

Epermenia gaedikei is a moth of the family Epermeniidae. It is found in Uzbekistan and the area around Dekhanobad and Derbent.
