= Parochromolopis mexicana =

Scientific classification
- Kingdom: Animalia
- Phylum: Arthropoda
- Clade: Pancrustacea
- Class: Insecta
- Order: Lepidoptera
- Family: Epermeniidae
- Genus: Parochromolopis
- Species: P. mexicana

Binomial name
- Parochromolopis mexicana Gaedike & Becker, 1989

Species of moth

Parochromolopis mexicana is a moth in the family Epermeniidae. It was described by Reinhard Gaedike and Vitor Osmar Becker in 1989. It is found in Chiapas, Mexico.
