= Gnathifera hollowayi =

Scientific classification
- Kingdom: Animalia
- Phylum: Arthropoda
- Clade: Pancrustacea
- Class: Insecta
- Order: Lepidoptera
- Family: Epermeniidae
- Genus: Gnathifera
- Species: G. hollowayi

Binomial name
- Gnathifera hollowayi Gaedike, 1981

Species of moth

Gnathifera hollowayi is a moth in the family Epermeniidae. It was described by Reinhard Gaedike in 1981. It is found in New Caledonia, east of Australia.
