= Sinicaepermenia taiwanella =

Scientific classification
- Kingdom: Animalia
- Phylum: Arthropoda
- Clade: Pancrustacea
- Class: Insecta
- Order: Lepidoptera
- Family: Epermeniidae
- Genus: Sinicaepermenia
- Species: S. taiwanella

Binomial name
- Sinicaepermenia taiwanella Heppner, 1990

Species of moth

Sinicaepermenia taiwanella is a moth in the family Epermeniidae. It was described by John B. Heppner in 1990. It is found in Taiwan.
