= Epermenia phorticopa =

Scientific classification
- Kingdom: Animalia
- Phylum: Arthropoda
- Clade: Pancrustacea
- Class: Insecta
- Order: Lepidoptera
- Family: Epermeniidae
- Genus: Epermenia
- Species: E. phorticopa

Binomial name
- Epermenia phorticopa Meyrick, 1921

Species of moth

Epermenia phorticopa is a moth in the family Epermeniidae. It was described by Edward Meyrick in 1921. It is found in India.

The wingspan is about 7 mm. The forewings are dark purplish fuscous, grey speckled and with an obscure grey spot above the tornus. The hindwings are grey.
