= Epermenia anacantha =

Scientific classification
- Kingdom: Animalia
- Phylum: Arthropoda
- Clade: Pancrustacea
- Class: Insecta
- Order: Lepidoptera
- Family: Epermeniidae
- Genus: Epermenia
- Species: E. anacantha

Binomial name
- Epermenia anacantha Meyrick, 1917

Species of moth

Epermenia anacantha is a moth in the family Epermeniidae. It was described by Edward Meyrick in 1917. It is found in Sri Lanka.

The wingspan is about 12 mm. The forewings are light fuscous or greyish ochreous, the base suffused with fine dark fuscous irroration (sprinkling) and the margins with a faint coarse strigulation of dark fuscous specks. The hindwings are grey.
