= Epermenia scurella =

Scientific classification
- Kingdom: Animalia
- Phylum: Arthropoda
- Clade: Pancrustacea
- Class: Insecta
- Order: Lepidoptera
- Family: Epermeniidae
- Genus: Epermenia
- Species: E. scurella

Binomial name
- Epermenia scurella (Stainton, 1851)

Synonyms
- Elachista scurella Stainton, 1851

Species of moth

Epermenia scurella is a moth of the family Epermeniidae. It is found in the mountains of central and southern Europe.

The larvae feed on Thesium species.
