= Epermenia insecurella =

Chalk-hill lance-wing

Scientific classification
- Kingdom: Animalia
- Phylum: Arthropoda
- Clade: Pancrustacea
- Class: Insecta
- Order: Lepidoptera
- Family: Epermeniidae
- Genus: Epermenia
- Species: E. insecurella

Binomial name
- Epermenia insecurella (Stainton, 1854)

Synonyms
- List: Elachista insecurella Stainton, 1854; Epermenia insecurellus; Elachista dentosella Herrich-Schäffer, 1854; Epermenia dentosella; Epermenia plumbeella Rebel, 1915

Species of moth

Epermenia insecurella, the chalk-hill lance-wing, is a moth of the family Epermeniidae. It is found in most of Europe, Asia Minor, the Near East and Mongolia.

The wingspan is 9–11 mm. The moths fly during the day and can be found on the wing in two generations, between May and August

The larvae feed on bastard-toadflax (Thesium humifusum) and Thesium inophyllon. They initially mine the leaves of their host plant.
