= Epermenia muraseae =

Scientific classification
- Kingdom: Animalia
- Phylum: Arthropoda
- Clade: Pancrustacea
- Class: Insecta
- Order: Lepidoptera
- Family: Epermeniidae
- Genus: Epermenia
- Species: E. muraseae

Binomial name
- Epermenia muraseae Gaedike & Kuroko, 2000

Species of moth

Epermenia muraseae is a moth of the family Epermeniidae. It is found in the islands of Honshu and Kyushu of Japan.

The larvae feed on Pittosporum tobira.
