= Epermenia isolexa =

Scientific classification
- Kingdom: Animalia
- Phylum: Arthropoda
- Clade: Pancrustacea
- Class: Insecta
- Order: Lepidoptera
- Family: Epermeniidae
- Genus: Epermenia
- Species: E. isolexa

Binomial name
- Epermenia isolexa (Meyrick, 1931)

Synonyms
- Epimarptis isolexa Meyrick, 1931

Species of moth

Epermenia isolexa is a moth in the family Epermeniidae. It was described by Edward Meyrick in 1931. It is found in India.
