= Epermenia nepalica =

Scientific classification
- Kingdom: Animalia
- Phylum: Arthropoda
- Clade: Pancrustacea
- Class: Insecta
- Order: Lepidoptera
- Family: Epermeniidae
- Genus: Epermenia
- Species: E. nepalica

Binomial name
- Epermenia nepalica Gaedike, 1996

Species of moth

Epermenia nepalica is a moth in the family Epermeniidae. It was described by Reinhard Gaedike in 1996. It is found in Nepal.

The wingspan is about 18 mm. Adults are similar to Epermenia vartianae but can be distinguished by the genitalia.
