= Gnathifera punctata =

Scientific classification
- Kingdom: Animalia
- Phylum: Arthropoda
- Clade: Pancrustacea
- Class: Insecta
- Order: Lepidoptera
- Family: Epermeniidae
- Genus: Gnathifera
- Species: G. punctata

Binomial name
- Gnathifera punctata Gaedike, 2013

Species of moth

Gnathifera punctata is a moth in the family Epermeniidae. It was described by Reinhard Gaedike in 2013. It is found in South Africa, where it has been recorded from the Northern Cape.
