= Epermenia pimpinella =

Scientific classification
- Kingdom: Animalia
- Phylum: Arthropoda
- Clade: Pancrustacea
- Class: Insecta
- Order: Lepidoptera
- Family: Epermeniidae
- Genus: Epermenia
- Species: E. pimpinella

Binomial name
- Epermenia pimpinella Murtfeldt, 1900

Species of moth

Epermenia pimpinella is a moth in the family Epermeniidae. It was described by Mary Murtfeldt in 1900. It is found in North America, where it has been recorded from South Carolina, Ohio, Illinois, Arkansas and Oklahoma.

The wingspan is 12–14 mm. The forewings range from dark slate grey to brownish, with an intermingling of dingy-white scales and with a generally smudged appearance with purplish reflections. There are three rounded dorsal tufts overlying a fine paler fringe. The hindwings are narrowly lanceolate, with long fine silky fringes.
