= Epermenia thailandica =

Scientific classification
- Kingdom: Animalia
- Phylum: Arthropoda
- Clade: Pancrustacea
- Class: Insecta
- Order: Lepidoptera
- Family: Epermeniidae
- Genus: Epermenia
- Species: E. thailandica

Binomial name
- Epermenia thailandica Gaedike, 1987

Synonyms
- Epermenia (Epermeniola) thailandica

Species of moth

Epermenia thailandica is a moth of the family Epermeniidae. It is found in Thailand, the Russian Far East and the islands of Honshu and Kyushu in Japan.

The length of the forewings is 5.5–7 mm.

The larvae feed on the fruit of Eleutherococcus senticosus. The species overwinters in the pupal stage.
