= Epermenia pithanopis =

Scientific classification
- Kingdom: Animalia
- Phylum: Arthropoda
- Clade: Pancrustacea
- Class: Insecta
- Order: Lepidoptera
- Family: Epermeniidae
- Genus: Epermenia
- Species: E. pithanopis

Binomial name
- Epermenia pithanopis Meyrick, 1921

Species of moth

Epermenia pithanopis is a moth in the family Epermeniidae. It was described by Edward Meyrick in 1921. It is found in India.

The wingspan is about 11 mm. The forewings are whitish, the costal half suffused with pale ferruginous brownish except for undefined spaces at about one-third and two-thirds. There is a streak of pale ferruginous-brownish suffusion along the fold and the discal stigmata is very small and black. There are three groups of projecting black scales from the dorsal margin. The hindwings are grey.
