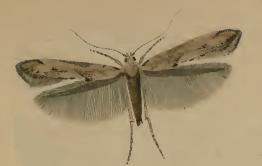

Scientific classification
- Kingdom: Animalia
- Phylum: Arthropoda
- Clade: Pancrustacea
- Class: Insecta
- Order: Lepidoptera
- Family: Epermeniidae
- Genus: Epermenia
- Species: E. aequidentellus

Binomial name
- Epermenia aequidentellus (E. Hofmann, 1867)

Synonyms
- Chauliodus aequidentellus E. Hofmann, 1867; Calotripis aequidentellus; Chauliodus daucellus Peyerimhoff, 1870; Epermenia daucellus

= Epermenia aequidentellus =

Species of moth

Epermenia aequidentellus, also known as the carrot lance-wing, is a moth of the family Epermeniidae found in Europe, Madeira and the Canary Islands. It was first described by Ernest Hofmann in 1867, from a specimen found in Vorderer Kaiser, near Kufstein, Austria.

== Description ==
The wingspan is 9–12 mm. Closely resembles Epermenia chaerophyllella see that species for differences.

Adults are on wing from June to July and again from September to October in two generations per year.

The larvae feed on bur-chervil (Anthriscus caucalis), Athamanta cretensis, wild carrot (Daucus carota), baldmoney (Meum athamanticum), Peucedanum species, burnet-saxifrage (Pimpinella saxifraga), villous deadly carrot (Thapsia villosa) and spreading hedgeparsley (Torilis arvensis neglecta). They initially mine the leaves of their host plant. Larvae can be found from May to June and again from August to September. They are translucent yellowish green with a darker dorsal line and black or brown spots and a black head.

== Distribution ==
It is found from Norway to the Iberian Peninsula, Italy and Greece and from Great Britain and Ireland to Estonia and Romania. It has also been recorded from the Canary Islands and Madeira.
