= Epermenia epirrhicna =

Scientific classification
- Kingdom: Animalia
- Phylum: Arthropoda
- Clade: Pancrustacea
- Class: Insecta
- Order: Lepidoptera
- Family: Epermeniidae
- Genus: Epermenia
- Species: E. epirrhicna

Binomial name
- Epermenia epirrhicna Meyrick, 1938

Species of moth

Epermenia epirrhicna is a moth in the family Epermeniidae. It was described by Edward Meyrick in 1938. It is found in the former Orientale Province of the Democratic Republic of the Congo.
