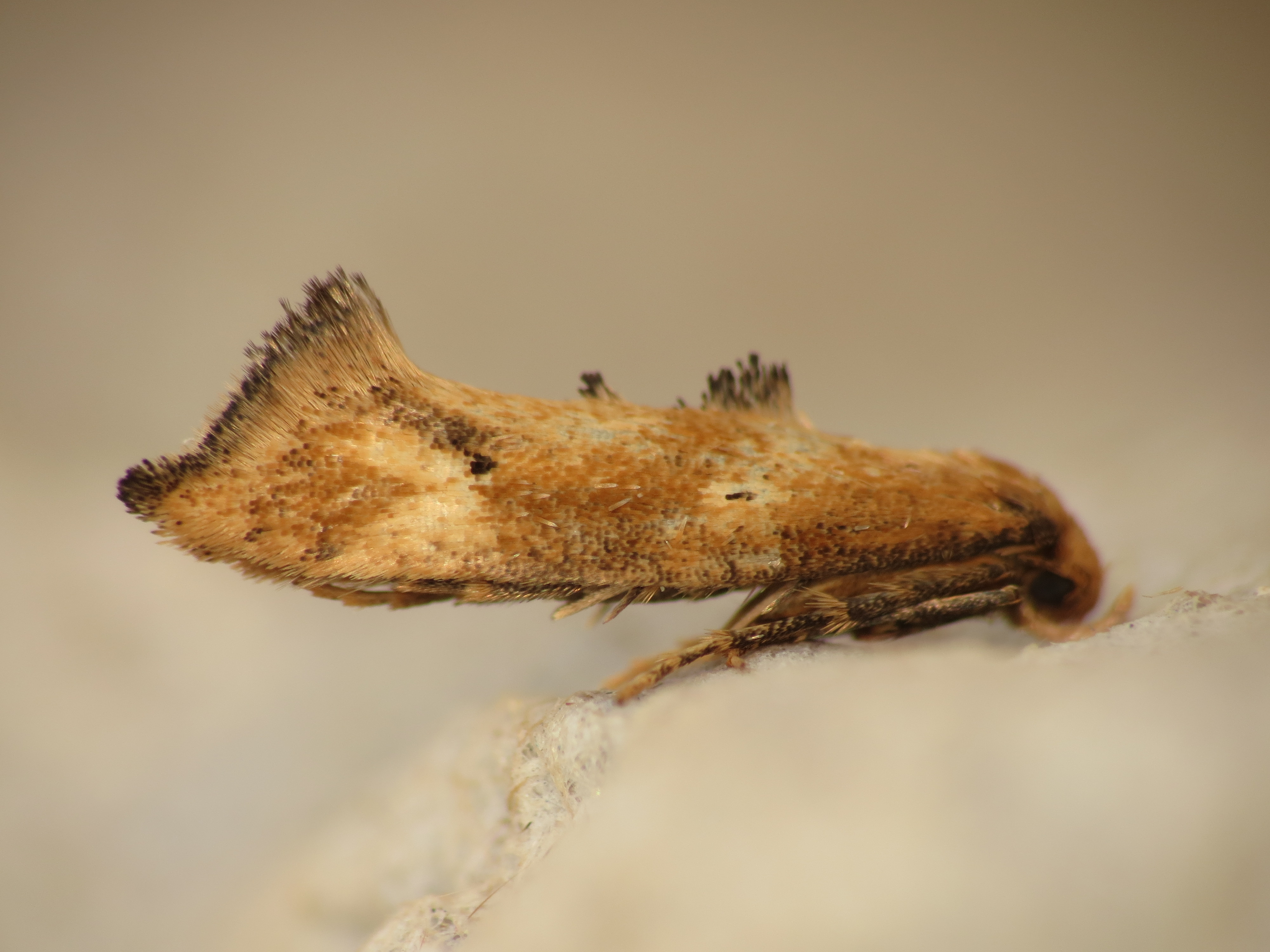
- Epermenia illigerella

Scientific classification
- Kingdom: Animalia
- Phylum: Arthropoda
- Clade: Pancrustacea
- Class: Insecta
- Order: Lepidoptera
- Family: Epermeniidae
- Genus: Epermenia; Hübner, [1825]

Synonyms
- Epermenia Hübner, [1825]; Calotripis Hübner, [1825]; Trichotrips Hübner, [1825]; Chaudiodus Treitschke, 1833 (preocc. Schneider, 1810); Lophonotus Stephens, 1834; Chauliomorpha Blanchard, 1840; Heydenia Hofmann, 1868 (preocc. Foerster, 1856); Cataplectica Walsingham, 1894; Acanthedra Meyrick, 1917; Epermeniola Gaedike, 1968

= Epermenia =

Genus of moths

Epermenia is a genus of moths in the family Epermeniidae. The genus was first described by Jacob Hübner in 1825.

== Species ==
- Subgenus Calotripis Hübner, 1825
  - Epermenia aarviki Gaedike, 2013
  - Epermenia aequidentellus (Hofmann, 1867) (originally in Chauliodus)
  - Epermenia albapunctella Busck, 1908
  - Epermenia bicornis Gaedike, 2004
  - Epermenia boliviana Gaedike, 2010
  - Epermenia brasiliana Gaedike & Becker, 1989
  - Epermenia brevilineolata Gaedike, 2004
  - Epermenia bulbosa Krüger, 2004
  - Epermenia californica Gaedike, 1977
  - Epermenia canadensis Gaedike, 2008
  - Epermenia chaerophyllella Goeze
  - Epermenia cicutaella Kearfott, 1903
  - Epermenia conioptila Meyrick, 1921
  - Epermenia costomaculata Gaedike, 2013
  - Epermenia criticodes Meyrick, 1913
  - Epermenia dallastai Gaedike, 2013
  - Epermenia exilis Meyrick, 1897 (Australia)
  - Epermenia falcata Gaedike, 2008
  - Epermenia falciformis Haworth, 1828
  - Epermenia formosa Gaedike, 2013
  - Epermenia gaedikei Budashkin, 2003
  - Epermenia griveaudi Gaedike, 2004
  - Epermenia hamata Gaedike, 2013
  - Epermenia ijimai Kuroko & Gaedike, 2006
  - Epermenia illigerella (Hübner, 1813) (originally in Tinea)
  - Epermenia imperialella Busck, 1906
  - Epermenia infracta Braun, 1926
  - Epermenia insecurella Stainton, 1849 (originally in Elachista)
  - Epermenia insularis Gaedike, 1979
  - Epermenia karurucola Gaedike, 2013
  - Epermenia lomatii Gaedike, 1977
  - Epermenia maculata Gaedike, 2004
  - Epermenia malawica Gaedike, 2004
  - Epermenia meyi Gaedike, 2004
  - Epermenia minuta Gaedike, 2004
  - Epermenia muraseae Kuroko & Gaedike, 2006
  - Epermenia orientalis Geadike, 1966
  - Epermenia paramalawica Gaedike, 2013
  - Epermenia parastolidota Gaedike, 2010
  - Epermenia petrusella Heylaerts, 1889
  - Epermenia pimpinella Murtfeldt, 1900
  - Epermenia ruwenzorica Gaedike, 2013
  - Epermenia shimekii Kuroko & Gaedike, 2006
  - Epermenia sinjovi Gaedike, 1993
  - Epermenia stolidota (Meyrick, 1917) (originally in Acanthedra)
  - Epermenia strictellus (Wocke, 1867) (originally in Chauliodus)
  - Epermenia tasmanica Gaedike, 1968 (Australia: Tasmania)
  - Epermenia tenuipennella Gaedike, 2013
  - Epermenia turicola Gaedike, 2013
  - Epermenia uedai Kuroko & Gaedike, 2006
- Subgenus Cataplectica Walsingham, 1894
  - Epermenia afghanistanella (Gaedike, 1971)
  - Epermenia devotella (Heyden, 1863)
  - Epermenia farreni (Walsingham, 1894)
  - Epermenia iniquella (Wocke, 1867) (originally in Chauliodus)
  - Epermenia kenyacola Gaedike, 2013
  - Epermenia mineti Gaedike, 2004
  - Epermenia nepalica Gaedike, 1996
  - Epermenia pulchokicola Gaedike, 2010
  - Epermenia sinica Gaedike, 1996
  - Epermenia sugisimai Kuroko & Gaedike, 2006
  - Epermenia theimeri Gaedike, 2001
  - Epermenia triacuta Gaedike, 2013
  - Epermenia vartianae (Gaedike, 1971)
  - Epermenia wockeella (Staudinger, 1880)
- Subgenus Epermenia
  - Epermenia agassizi Gaedike, 2013
  - Epermenia dalianicola Gaedike, 2007
  - Epermenia ochreomaculella Millière, 1854
  - Epermenia pontificella (Hübner, 1796) (originally in Tinea)
  - Epermenia scurella (Stainton, 1851)
- Subgenus Epermeniola Gaedike, 1968
  - Epermenia bicuspis Gaedike, 2010
  - Epermenia bidentata (Diakonoff, 1955) (originally in Ochromolopis)
  - Epermenia caledonica Gaedike, 1981
  - Epermenia commonella Gaedike, 1968 (Australia)
  - Epermenia davisi Gaedike, 2010
  - Epermenia ergastica Meyrick, 1917
  - Epermenia fuscomaculata Kuroko & Gaedike, 2006
  - Epermenia oculigera (Diakonoff, 1955) (originally in Ochromolopis)
  - Epermenia pseudofuscomaculata Kuroko & Gaedike, 2006
  - Epermenia thailandica Gaedike, 1987
  - Epermenia trifilata Meyrick, 1932
  - Epermenia trileucota Meyrick, 1921 (Australia)
- Subgenus unknown
  - Epermenia anacantha Meyrick, 1917
  - Epermenia dracontias Meyrick, 1917
  - Epermenia ellochistis Meyrick, 1917
  - Epermenia epirrhicna Meyrick, 1938
  - Epermenia epispora Meyrick, 1897 (Australia)
  - Epermenia isolexa Meyrick, 1931
  - Epermenia leucomantis Meyrick, 1917
  - Epermenia macescens Meyrick, 1917
  - Epermenia oriplanta Bradley, 1965
  - Epermenia ozodes Meyrick, 1917
  - Epermenia parasitica Meyrick, 1930
  - Epermenia philorites (Bradley, 1965)
  - Epermenia phorticopa Meyrick, 1921
  - Epermenia pithanopis Meyrick, 1921
  - Epermenia profugella (Stainton, 1856)
  - Epermenia symmorias Meyrick, 1923
  - Epermenia xeranta Meyrick, 1917 (Australia)

== Former species ==
- Epermenia alameda Braun, 1923
- Epermenia anthracoptila Meyrick, 1931
- Epermenia asiatica Gaedike, 1979
- Epermenia canicinctella (Clemens, 1863) (originally in Chauliodus)
- Epermenia daucellus (Peyerimhoff, 1870) (originally in Chauliodus)
- Epermenia dentosella Herrich-Schäffer, 1854
- Epermenia fasciculellus (Stephens, 1834) (originally in Lophonotus)
- Epermenia ithycentra Meyrick, 1926
- Epermenia kroneella Rebel, 1903
- Epermenia nigrostriatellus (Heylaerts, 1883) (originally in Chauliodus)
- Epermenia notodoxa Gozmany, 1952
- Epermenia ochrodesma Meyrick, 1913
- Epermenia plumbeella Rebel, 1916
- Epermenia praefumata Meyrick, 1911
- Epermenia prohaskaella Schawerda, 1921
- Epermenia proserga Meyrick, 1913
- Epermenia schurellus Herrich-Schäffer, 1855
- Epermenia strictelloides Gaedike, 1977
- Epermenia sublimicola Meyrick, 1930
- Epermenia testaceella (Hübner, 1813) (originally in Tinea)
- Epermenia turatiella Costantini, 1923

See also:

- "Epermenia philocoma" (possibly a spurious database only recombination) for Epimarptis philocoma Meyrick, 1914
- "Epermenia septicodes" (possibly a spurious database only recombination) for Epimarptis septicodes Meyrick, 1917
