= Parochromolopis parishi =

Scientific classification
- Kingdom: Animalia
- Phylum: Arthropoda
- Clade: Pancrustacea
- Class: Insecta
- Order: Lepidoptera
- Family: Epermeniidae
- Genus: Parochromolopis
- Species: P. parishi

Binomial name
- Parochromolopis parishi Gaedike, 1977

Species of moth

Parochromolopis parishi is a moth in the family Epermeniidae. It was described by Reinhard Gaedike in 1977. It is found in Peru.
