= Epermenia albapunctella =

Scientific classification
- Kingdom: Animalia
- Phylum: Arthropoda
- Clade: Pancrustacea
- Class: Insecta
- Order: Lepidoptera
- Family: Epermeniidae
- Genus: Epermenia
- Species: E. albapunctella

Binomial name
- Epermenia albapunctella Busck, 1908

Species of moth

Epermenia albapunctella is a moth in the family Epermeniidae. It was described by August Busck in 1908. It is found in North America, where it has been recorded from Illinois, Indiana, Maine, Minnesota, New Brunswick, North Carolina, Northwest Territories, Nova Scotia, Ohio, Ontario, Pennsylvania and Quebec.

The wingspan is about 13 mm. The forewings are dark fuscous, mottled with lighter fuscous and with black and brown scales. There is an ill-defined, broad, blackish fascia across the middle of the wing, preceded and followed by lighter patches. There is a round white dot at the end of the cell, preceded and followed by a black longitudinal dash. The hindwings are dark fuscous.

The larvae feed on Osmorhiza occidentalis, Ligusticum scoticum and Heracleum species.
