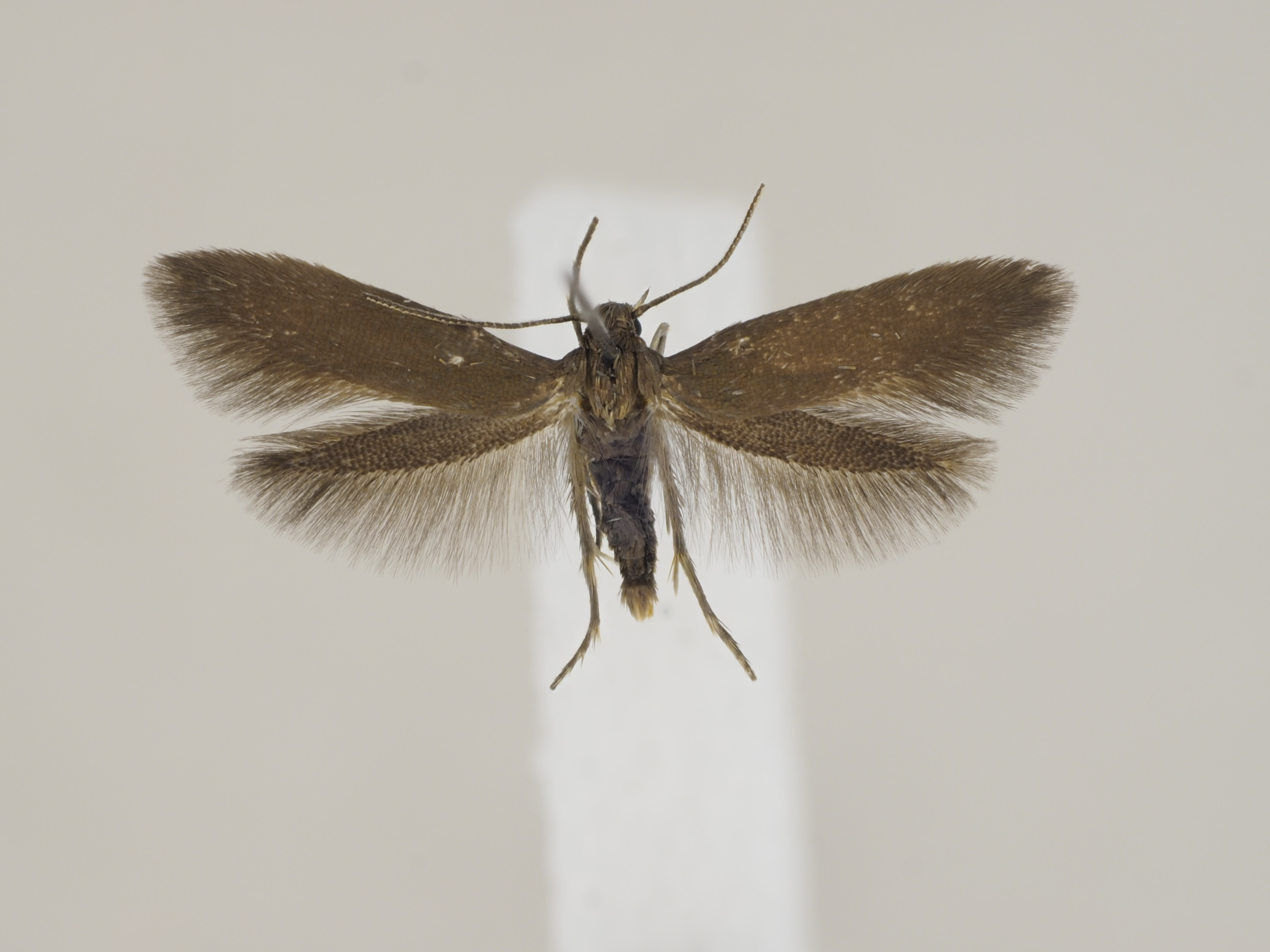

Scientific classification
- Kingdom: Animalia
- Phylum: Arthropoda
- Clade: Pancrustacea
- Class: Insecta
- Order: Lepidoptera
- Family: Epermeniidae
- Genus: Epermenia
- Species: E. profugella

Binomial name
- Epermenia profugella (Stainton, 1856)

Synonyms
- Asychna profugella Stainton, 1856

= Epermenia profugella =

Species of moth

Epermenia profugella, also known as the little lance-wing, is a moth of the family Epermeniidae found in northern, central and eastern Europe. The moth was first described by Henry Tibbats Stainton in 1856, from a specimen found in Kemsing, Kent, England.

== Description ==
The wingspan is 8–10 mm. The forewings are dull greyish bronze, tinged with fuscous and the hindwings are dark grey.

Ova, are probably laid on the seeds of ground-elder (Aegopodium podagraria), angelica (Angelica sylvestris), wild carrot (Daucus carota) and burnet-saxifrage (Pimpinella saxifraga). The larvae feed within the seeds, spinning two or three together during September and October. Feeding is inconspicuous, but larvae can sometimes be seen on the outside of seeds. The species overwinters in the pupal stage within a flimsy cocoon on the ground.
