= Epermenia philorites =

Scientific classification
- Kingdom: Animalia
- Phylum: Arthropoda
- Clade: Pancrustacea
- Class: Insecta
- Order: Lepidoptera
- Family: Epermeniidae
- Genus: Epermenia
- Species: E. philorites

Binomial name
- Epermenia philorites (Bradley, 1965)

Synonyms
- Scythris philorites Bradley, 1965

Species of moth

Epermenia philorites is a moth in the family Epermeniidae. It was described by John David Bradley in 1965. It is found in Uganda.
