= Epermenia criticodes =

Scientific classification
- Kingdom: Animalia
- Phylum: Arthropoda
- Clade: Pancrustacea
- Class: Insecta
- Order: Lepidoptera
- Family: Epermeniidae
- Genus: Epermenia
- Species: E. criticodes

Binomial name
- Epermenia criticodes Meyrick, 1913

Species of moth

Epermenia criticodes is a moth in the family Epermeniidae. It was described by Edward Meyrick in 1913. It is found in Kenya and the South African provinces of Western Cape and Mpumalanga.
