= Epermenia wockeella =

Scientific classification
- Kingdom: Animalia
- Phylum: Arthropoda
- Clade: Pancrustacea
- Class: Insecta
- Order: Lepidoptera
- Family: Epermeniidae
- Genus: Epermenia
- Species: E. wockeella

Binomial name
- Epermenia wockeella (Staudinger, 1880)

Synonyms
- Chauliodus wockeella Staudinger, 1880

Species of moth

Epermenia wockeella is a moth of the family Epermeniidae. It is found in Turkey and Turkmenistan.
