= Epermenia dalianicola =

Scientific classification
- Kingdom: Animalia
- Phylum: Arthropoda
- Clade: Pancrustacea
- Class: Insecta
- Order: Lepidoptera
- Family: Epermeniidae
- Genus: Epermenia
- Species: E. dalianicola

Binomial name
- Epermenia dalianicola Gaedike, 2007

Species of moth

Epermenia dalianicola is a moth in the family Epermeniidae. It was described by Reinhard Gaedike in 2007. The species is found in Liaoning, China.
