= Epermenia ijimai =

Scientific classification
- Kingdom: Animalia
- Phylum: Arthropoda
- Clade: Pancrustacea
- Class: Insecta
- Order: Lepidoptera
- Family: Epermeniidae
- Genus: Epermenia
- Species: E. ijimai

Binomial name
- Epermenia ijimai Kuroko & Gaedike, 2006

Species of moth

Epermenia ijimai is a moth of the family Epermeniidae. It is endemic to Hokkaido, Japan.

The length of the forewings is about 6.2 millimetres (0.24 in).

== Etymology ==
The species is named in honour of Mr. Kazuo Ijima, who collected the holotype.
