= Epermenia dallastai =

Scientific classification
- Kingdom: Animalia
- Phylum: Arthropoda
- Clade: Pancrustacea
- Class: Insecta
- Order: Lepidoptera
- Family: Epermeniidae
- Genus: Epermenia
- Species: E. dallastai

Binomial name
- Epermenia dallastai Gaedike, 2013

Species of moth

Epermenia dallastai is a moth in the family Epermeniidae. It was described by Reinhard Gaedike in 2013. It is found in Kenya.
