= Epermenia caledonica =

Scientific classification
- Kingdom: Animalia
- Phylum: Arthropoda
- Clade: Pancrustacea
- Class: Insecta
- Order: Lepidoptera
- Family: Epermeniidae
- Genus: Epermenia
- Species: E. caledonica

Binomial name
- Epermenia caledonica Gaedike, 1981

Species of moth

Epermenia caledonica is a moth in the family Epermeniidae. It was described by Reinhard Gaedike in 1981. It is found in New Caledonia.
