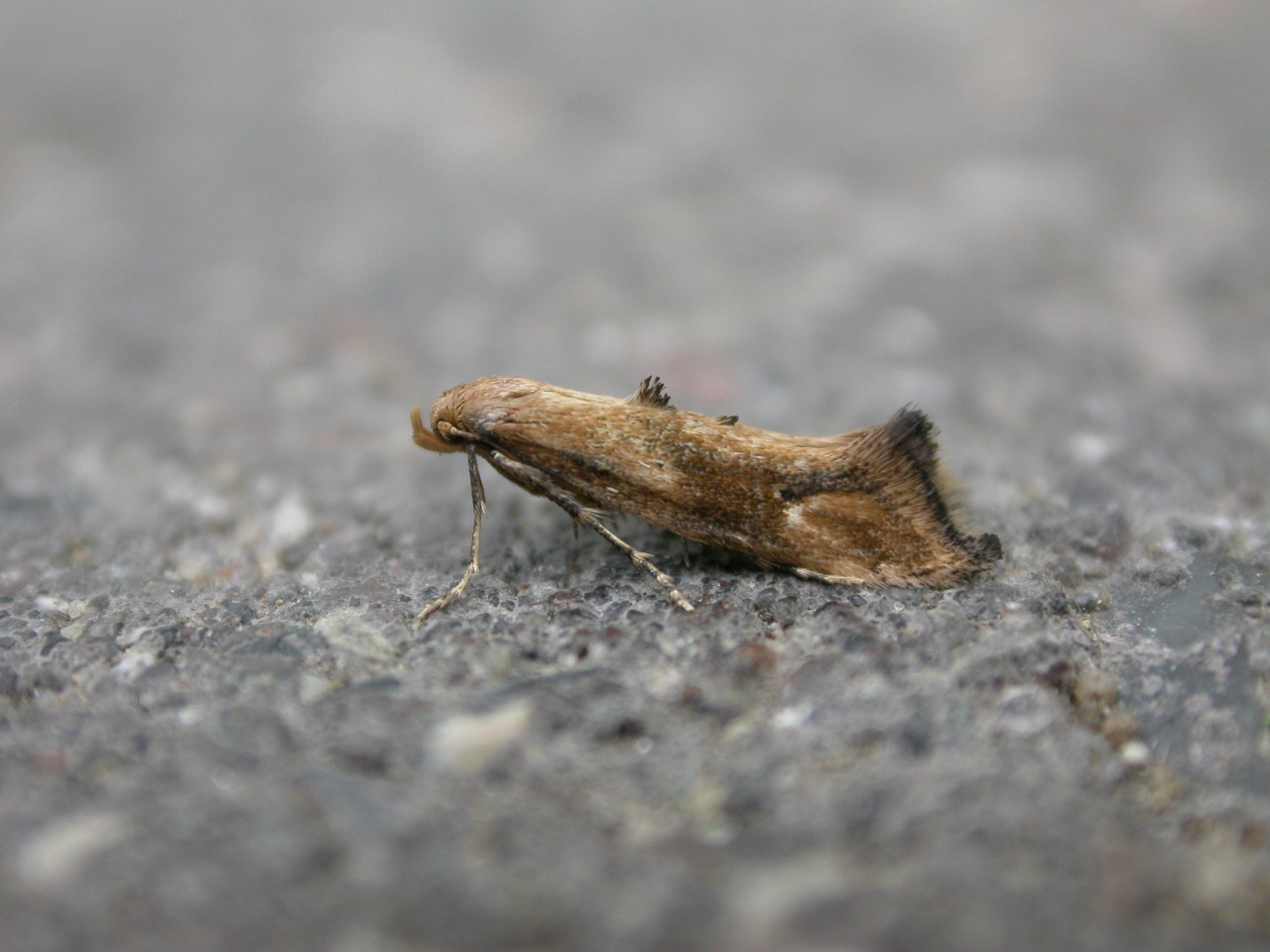

Scientific classification
- Kingdom: Animalia
- Phylum: Arthropoda
- Clade: Pancrustacea
- Class: Insecta
- Order: Lepidoptera
- Family: Epermeniidae
- Genus: Epermenia
- Species: E. illigerella

Binomial name
- Epermenia illigerella (Hübner, 1813)

Synonyms
- Tinea illigerella Hübner, 1813

= Epermenia illigerella =

Species of moth

Epermenia illigerella is a moth of the family Epermeniidae. It is known from most of Europe (except the Iberian Peninsula and the western and southern part of the Balkan Peninsula), as well as western Siberia and the Altai region.

The wingspan is 12–13 mm.

The larvae feed on the leaves of Aegopodium podagrariae.
