= Gnathifera pseudaphronesa =

Scientific classification
- Kingdom: Animalia
- Phylum: Arthropoda
- Clade: Pancrustacea
- Class: Insecta
- Order: Lepidoptera
- Family: Epermeniidae
- Genus: Gnathifera
- Species: G. pseudaphronesa

Binomial name
- Gnathifera pseudaphronesa (Gaedike, 1972)

Synonyms
- Ochromolopis pseudaphronesa Gaedike, 1972

Species of moth

Gnathifera pseudaphronesa is a moth in the family Epermeniidae. It was described by Reinhard Gaedike in 1972. It is found in Australia, where it has been recorded from New South Wales.
