= Gnathifera bipunctata =

Scientific classification
- Kingdom: Animalia
- Phylum: Arthropoda
- Clade: Pancrustacea
- Class: Insecta
- Order: Lepidoptera
- Family: Epermeniidae
- Genus: Gnathifera
- Species: G. bipunctata

Binomial name
- Gnathifera bipunctata (Gaedike, 1968)

Synonyms
- Ochromolopis bipunctata Gaedike, 1968

Species of moth

Gnathifera bipunctata is a moth in the family Epermeniidae. It was described by Reinhard Gaedike in 1968. It is found in Australia, where it has been recorded from New South Wales.
