= Epermenia trileucota =

Scientific classification
- Kingdom: Animalia
- Phylum: Arthropoda
- Clade: Pancrustacea
- Class: Insecta
- Order: Lepidoptera
- Family: Epermeniidae
- Genus: Epermenia
- Species: E. trileucota

Binomial name
- Epermenia trileucota Meyrick, 1921

Species of moth

Epermenia trileucota is a moth in the family Epermeniidae. It was described by Edward Meyrick in 1921. It is found in Australia, where it has been recorded from South Australia.

The wingspan is about 11 mm. The forewings are grey with a cloudy-blackish dot towards the costa at one-fifth and three white rhomboidal spots on the dorsum from the base to the middle. Between these are blackish spots obliquely surmounted by ochreous-brown spots, between these and the costa some undefined dark fuscous irroration (sprinkles). There is a small black dot in the disc above the second white spot, and a larger one at two-thirds, beyond this some slight ochreous-brown suffusion. There are also two small dark fuscous spots on the costa towards the apex and there are scattered short projecting scales from the dark dorsal spots. The hindwings are light grey.
