= Sinicaepermenia =

Scientific classification
- Kingdom: Animalia
- Phylum: Arthropoda
- Clade: Pancrustacea
- Class: Insecta
- Order: Lepidoptera
- Family: Epermeniidae
- Genus: Sinicaepermenia; Heppner, 1990

Genus of moths

Sinicaepermenia is a genus of moths in the family Epermeniidae.

== Species ==
- Sinicaepermenia sauropophaga Gaedike, Kuroko & Funahashi, 2008
- Sinicaepermenia taiwanella Heppner, 1990
