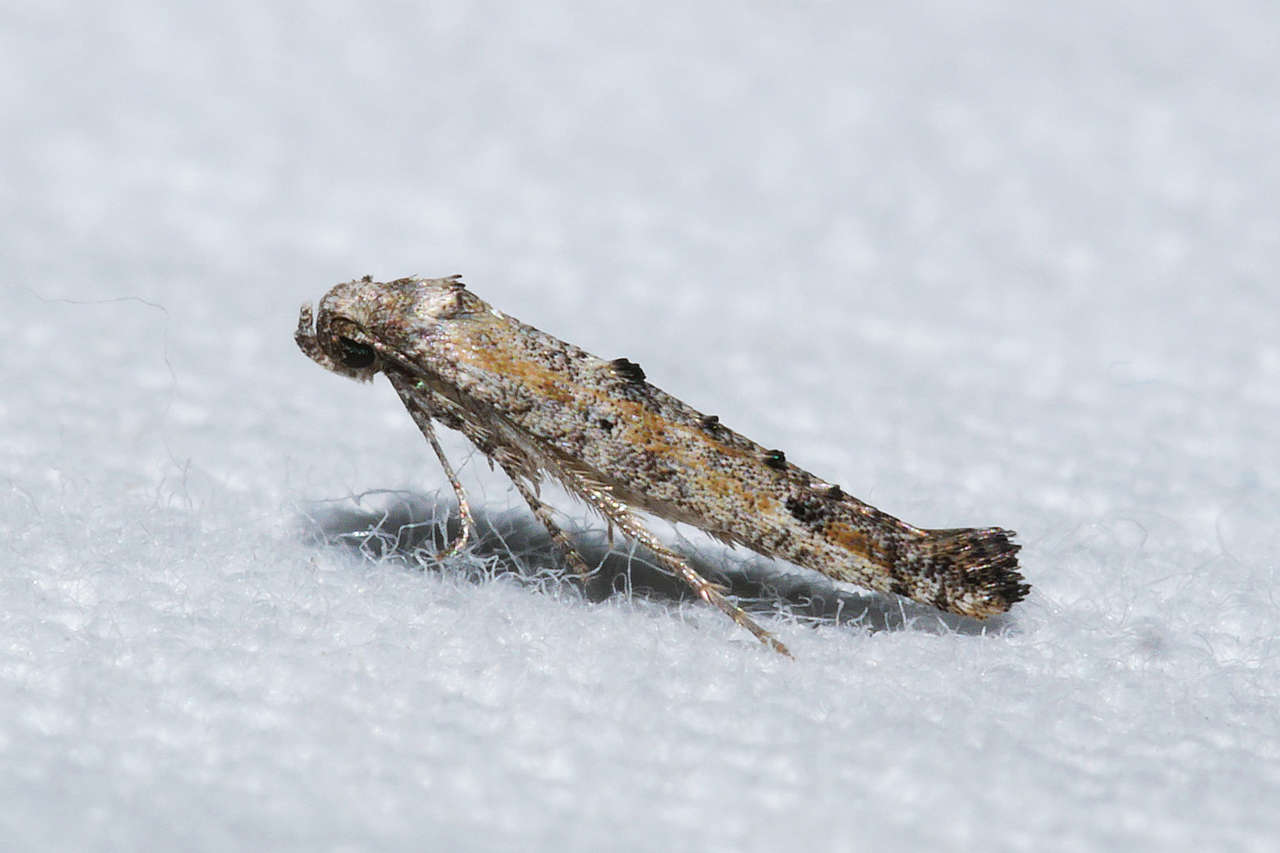

Scientific classification
- Kingdom: Animalia
- Phylum: Arthropoda
- Clade: Pancrustacea
- Class: Insecta
- Order: Lepidoptera
- Family: Epermeniidae
- Genus: Epermenia
- Species: E. exilis

Binomial name
- Epermenia exilis Meyrick, 1897

= Epermenia exilis =

Species of moth

Epermenia exilis is a moth in the family Epermeniidae. It was described by Edward Meyrick in 1897. It is found in Australia, where it has been recorded from South Australia and New South Wales.

The wingspan is 10–13 mm. The forewings are fuscous, mixed with whitish and irregularly irrorated or strigulated with dark fuscous. There is a narrow indistinct dark fuscous inwardly oblique fascia before the middle and a black dot in the disc before this, and another at three-fourths, beyond which is an indistinct ochreous spot. There are four small equidistant black dorsal scale-teeth, the first at one-third and the fourth at the tornus, as well as a black costal dot towards the apex. The hindwings are light grey.
