= Epermenia bidentata =

Scientific classification
- Kingdom: Animalia
- Phylum: Arthropoda
- Clade: Pancrustacea
- Class: Insecta
- Order: Lepidoptera
- Family: Epermeniidae
- Genus: Epermenia
- Species: E. bidentata

Binomial name
- Epermenia bidentata (Diakonoff, 1955)

Synonyms
- Ochromolopis bidentata Diakonoff, 1955

Species of moth

Epermenia bidentata is a moth in the family Epermeniidae. It was described by Alexey Diakonoff in 1955. It is found in New Guinea.
