= Epermenia epispora =

Scientific classification
- Kingdom: Animalia
- Phylum: Arthropoda
- Clade: Pancrustacea
- Class: Insecta
- Order: Lepidoptera
- Family: Epermeniidae
- Genus: Epermenia
- Species: E. epispora

Binomial name
- Epermenia epispora Meyrick, 1897

Species of moth

Epermenia epispora is a moth in the family Epermeniidae. It was described by Edward Meyrick in 1897. It is found in Australia, where it has been recorded from Queensland and New South Wales.

The wingspan is 9–11 mm. The forewings are fuscous, finely whitish sprinkled and with scattered strigulae of dark fuscous scales. There is a slender indistinct dark fuscous inwardly oblique fasciae at one-fourth and halfway, the latter terminating in a large dark fuscous dorsal scale-tooth at one-third, and is followed by a triangular dorsal white suffusion. There is a moderately broad ill-defined dark fuscous vertical fascia at two-thirds, marked with an ochreous spot in the disc, and terminating in a dark fuscous tornal scale-tooth. There is also a black discal dot at three-fourths, partly white edged. The costa is posteriorly spotted with dark fuscous. The hindwings are fuscous.
