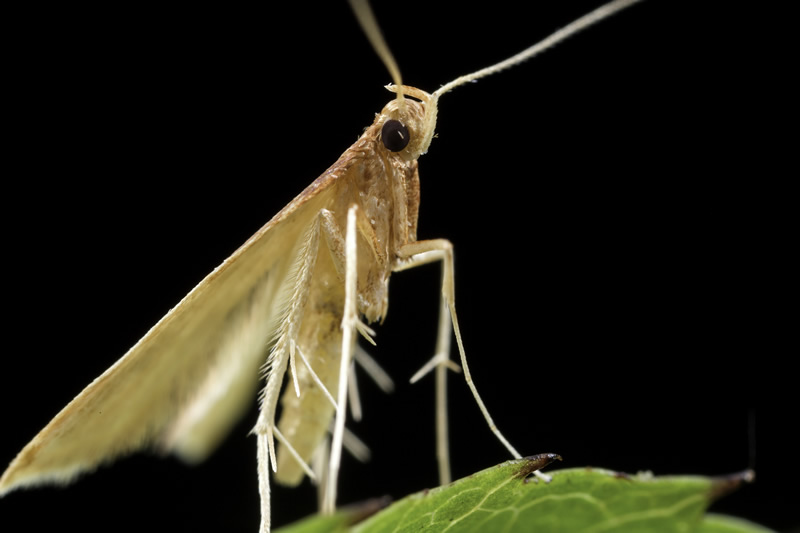

Scientific classification
- Kingdom: Animalia
- Phylum: Arthropoda
- Clade: Pancrustacea
- Class: Insecta
- Order: Lepidoptera
- Family: Epermeniidae
- Genus: Thambotricha; Meyrick, 1922
- Species: T. vates

Binomial name
- Thambotricha vates Meyrick, 1922

= Thambotricha =

Genus of moths

Thambotricha is a monotypic genus of moths in the family Epermeniidae. Its sole known species, Thambotricha vates, is also known by the vernacular name wonder-haired prophet. It is endemic to New Zealand. This species is classified as "At Risk, Naturally Uncommon" by the Department of Conservation.

== Taxonomy and etymology ==
T. vates was first described by Edward Meyrick in 1922 from a specimen collected in Wellington in March by Charles Edwin Clarke. George Hudson discussed and illustrated the species in his 1928 book The Butterflies and Moths of New Zealand. The holotype specimen is held at the Natural History Museum, London. The vernacular name of this species, "wonder-haired prophet", comes from a translation of its Latin name. The name is as a result of the male having very long hairs on its antenna. The male holotype specimen of T. vates is held at the Natural History Museum, London.

== Description ==
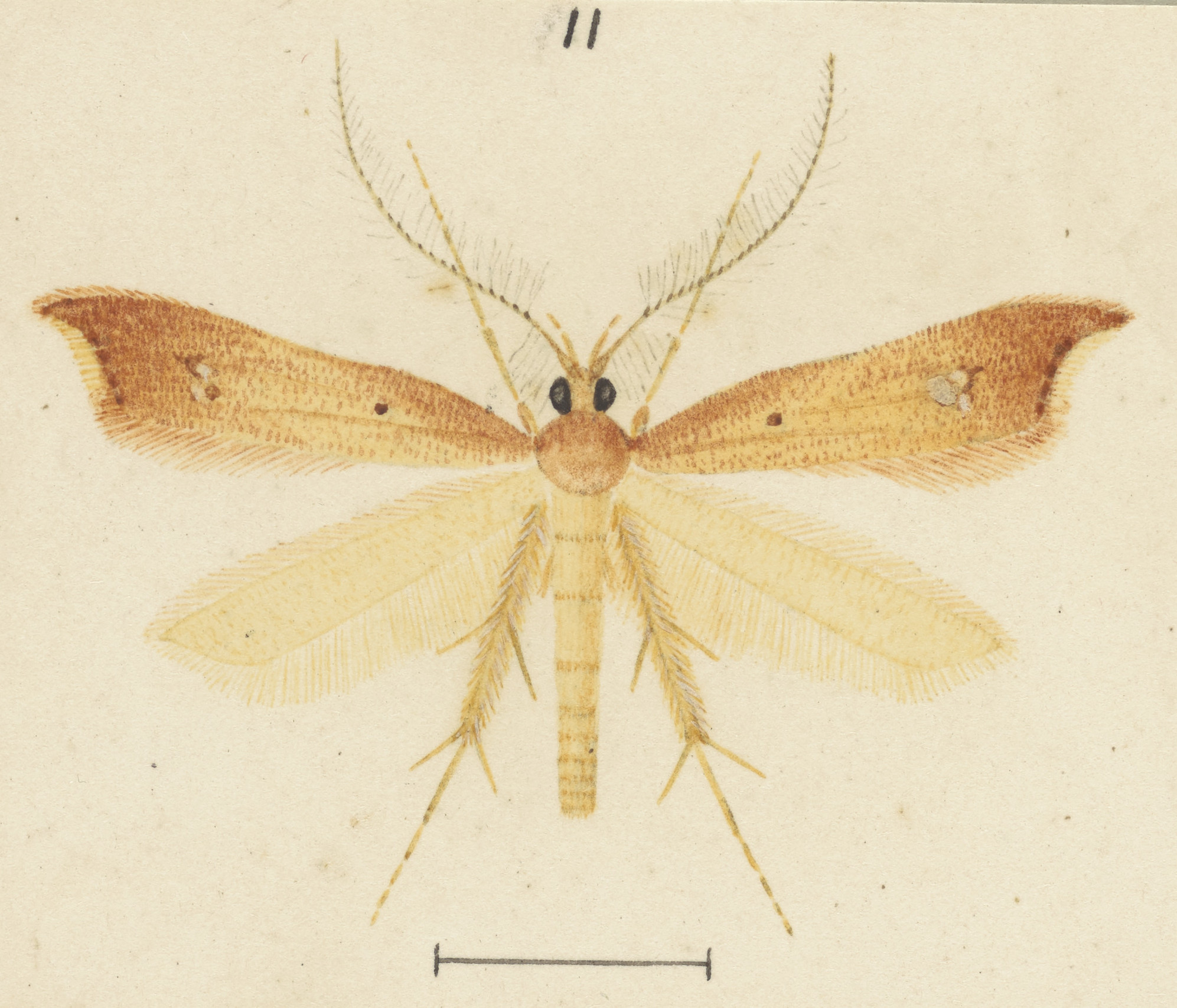
Illustration of T. vates by George Hudson.

Meyrick described the genus as follows:

Head with appressed seales; ocelli posterior; tongue developed. Antenne 5/6 in ♂ slender, joints elongate, with spreading whorls of extremely long fine ciliations, basal joint moderate, rather stout, with rather small pecten. Labial palpi long, recurved, second joint thickened with scales forming a very short apical tuft beneath, terminal joint somewhat shorter than second, rather thickened with scales, pointed. Maxillary palpi very short, drooping, filiform. Posterior tibiae with series of rough projecting bristly scales above. Fore wings with 1b fureate, 2 from 5/6, 7 to termen, 11 from middle. Hind wings 4, elongate-trapezoidal, cilia 13; 2 remote, 3 and 4 approximated at base, 5-7 somewhat approximated towards base.

Meyrick described the species as follows:

♂︎ 14mm. Head pale ochreous, side-tufts bronzv. Palpi bronzy-fuscous. Antennal ciliations 8. Thorax purple-bronzy-ochreous. Abdomen whitish-ochreous. Fore wings elongate, narrowed towards base, costa sinuate, apex pointed, termen faintly sinuate, oblique; pale yellow overlaid with purple-bronzy-ochreous, costal edge pale yellow from 2/5 to 4/5; discal stigmata remote, rather dark fuscous, an additional dot beneath and rather before second, these two partially surrounded with pale yellowish; a slender terminal streak of purple-fuscous suffusion; cilia whitish-yellowish, on costa suffused purple-ochreous, darkest above apex, on dorsum pale ochreous tinged purple, cilia extending to before middle of dorsum. Hind wings and cilia ochreous-whitish.

== Distribution ==
This species is endemic to New Zealand. Along with its type locality of Gollan's Valley in Wellington, this moth has also been collected at the Waipoua State Forest in Northland, in the Hakarimata Range near Ngāruawāhia in the Waikato, in Taranaki, at Katikati in the Bay of Plenty, and near Aorere River in Nelson.

== Biology and life cycle ==
Little is known of the biology of this species. T. vates are on the wing in March. This species appears not to be attracted to light and has been caught by sweeping during daytime. Males of the species have been however been collected at night with the use of a pressure lamp.

== Host species and habitat ==
The host species of the larvae of this moth is unknown. This species prefers native forest habitat.

== Conservation status ==
This species has been classified as having the "At Risk, Naturally Uncommon" conservation status under the New Zealand Threat Classification System.
