= Epermenia xeranta =

Scientific classification
- Kingdom: Animalia
- Phylum: Arthropoda
- Clade: Pancrustacea
- Class: Insecta
- Order: Lepidoptera
- Family: Epermeniidae
- Genus: Epermenia
- Species: E. xeranta

Binomial name
- Epermenia xeranta Meyrick, 1917

Species of moth

Epermenia xeranta is a moth in the family Epermeniidae. It was described by Edward Meyrick in 1917. It is found in Australia, where it has been recorded from Queensland.

The wingspan is about 10 mm. The forewings are pale greyish, irregularly sprinkled with dark fuscous and blackish, forming fine strigulae along the costa. The discal stigmata is small, black and rather approximated, while the second is hardly beyond the middle. There is a blotch of dark grey suffusion on the costa at two-thirds and a blackish apical dot, edged anteriorly by a slight indistinct whitish mark. The hindwings are grey, but paler towards the base.
