= Epermenia tasmanica =

Scientific classification
- Kingdom: Animalia
- Phylum: Arthropoda
- Clade: Pancrustacea
- Class: Insecta
- Order: Lepidoptera
- Family: Epermeniidae
- Genus: Epermenia
- Species: E. tasmanica

Binomial name
- Epermenia tasmanica Gaedike, 1968

Species of moth

Epermenia tasmanica is a moth in the family Epermeniidae. It was described by Reinhard Gaedike in 1968. It is found in Australia, where it has been recorded from Tasmania.
