= Gnathifera aphronesa =

Scientific classification
- Kingdom: Animalia
- Phylum: Arthropoda
- Class: Insecta
- Order: Lepidoptera
- Family: Epermeniidae
- Genus: Gnathifera
- Species: G. aphronesa

Binomial name
- Gnathifera aphronesa (Meyrick, 1897)

Synonyms
- Epermenia aphronesa Meyrick, 1897

Species of moth

Gnathifera aphronesa is a moth in the family Epermeniidae. It was described by Edward Meyrick in 1897. It is found in Australia, where it has been recorded from Tasmania.

The wingspan is about 14 mm. The forewings are light brown, reddish tinged and sprinkled with whitish and dark fuscous. There is a broad undefined white subcostal streak from beneath the costa near the base to the costa at four-fifths and an oblique irregular blackish bar from the costa at one-fifth, reaching to the fold. There is also a black dot beneath the costa at two-fifths, one in the disc close beyond the bar, one on the fold before the middle followed by a ferruginous spot, one in the disc beyond the middle, one at three-fourths edged with white and one on the costa beyond four-fifths. There are also blackish dorsal scale-teeth before and beyond the middle, as well as a round blackish apical spot, preceded by a white costal spot. The hindwings are pale grey.
