= Mesepermenia =

Scientific classification
- Kingdom: Animalia
- Phylum: Arthropoda
- Clade: Pancrustacea
- Class: Insecta
- Order: Lepidoptera
- Family: Epermeniidae
- Genus: Mesepermenia; Gaedike, 2004
- Species: M. malgachica

Binomial name
- Mesepermenia malgachica Gaedike, 2004

Genus of moths

Mesepermenia is a monotypic moth genus in the family Epermeniidae described by Reinhard Gaedike in 2004. Its only species, Mesepermenia malgachica, was described by the same author in the same year. It is found on Madagascar.
