= Parochromolopis =

Scientific classification
- Kingdom: Animalia
- Phylum: Arthropoda
- Clade: Pancrustacea
- Class: Insecta
- Order: Lepidoptera
- Family: Epermeniidae
- Genus: Parochromolopis; Gaedike, 1977

Genus of moths

Parochromolopis is a genus of moths in the family Epermeniidae.

== Species ==
- Parochromolopis bicolor Gaedike & Becker, 1989
- Parochromolopis floridana Gaedike, 1977
- Parochromolopis fuscocostata Gaedike & Becker, 1989
- Parochromolopis gielisi Gaedike, 2010
- Parochromolopis mexicana Gaedike & Becker, 1989
- Parochromolopis parishi Gaedike, 1977
- Parochromolopis parva Gaedike & Becker, 1989
- Parochromolopis psittacanthus Heppner, 1980
- Parochromolopis syncrata (Meyrick, 1921) (originally in Epermenia)
