= Gnathifera proserga =

Scientific classification
- Kingdom: Animalia
- Phylum: Arthropoda
- Class: Insecta
- Order: Lepidoptera
- Family: Epermeniidae
- Genus: Gnathifera
- Species: G. proserga

Binomial name
- Gnathifera proserga (Meyrick, 1913)

Synonyms
- Epermenia proserga Meyrick, 1913

Species of moth

Gnathifera proserga is a moth in the family Epermeniidae. It was described by Edward Meyrick in 1913. It is found in South Africa.
