= Africepermenia =

Scientific classification
- Kingdom: Animalia
- Phylum: Arthropoda
- Clade: Pancrustacea
- Class: Insecta
- Order: Lepidoptera
- Family: Epermeniidae
- Genus: Africepermenia; Gaedike, 2004
- Species: A. tanzanica

Binomial name
- Africepermenia tanzanica Gaedike, 2004

Genus of moths

Africepermenia is a monotypic genus of moths in the family Epermeniidae. Its sole species, Africepermenia tanzanica, was described by Reinhard Gaedike in 2004. It is found in Kenya and Tanzania.
