= Inuncus =

Scientific classification
- Kingdom: Animalia
- Phylum: Arthropoda
- Clade: Pancrustacea
- Class: Insecta
- Order: Lepidoptera
- Family: Epermeniidae
- Genus: Inuncus; Gaedike, 2013
- Species: I. juratae

Binomial name
- Inuncus juratae Gaedike, 2013

Genus of moths

Inuncus is a monotypic moth genus in the family Epermeniidae described by Reinhard Gaedike in 2013. Its sole species, Inuncus juratae, was described by the same author in the same year. It is found in Kenya and Tanzania.
