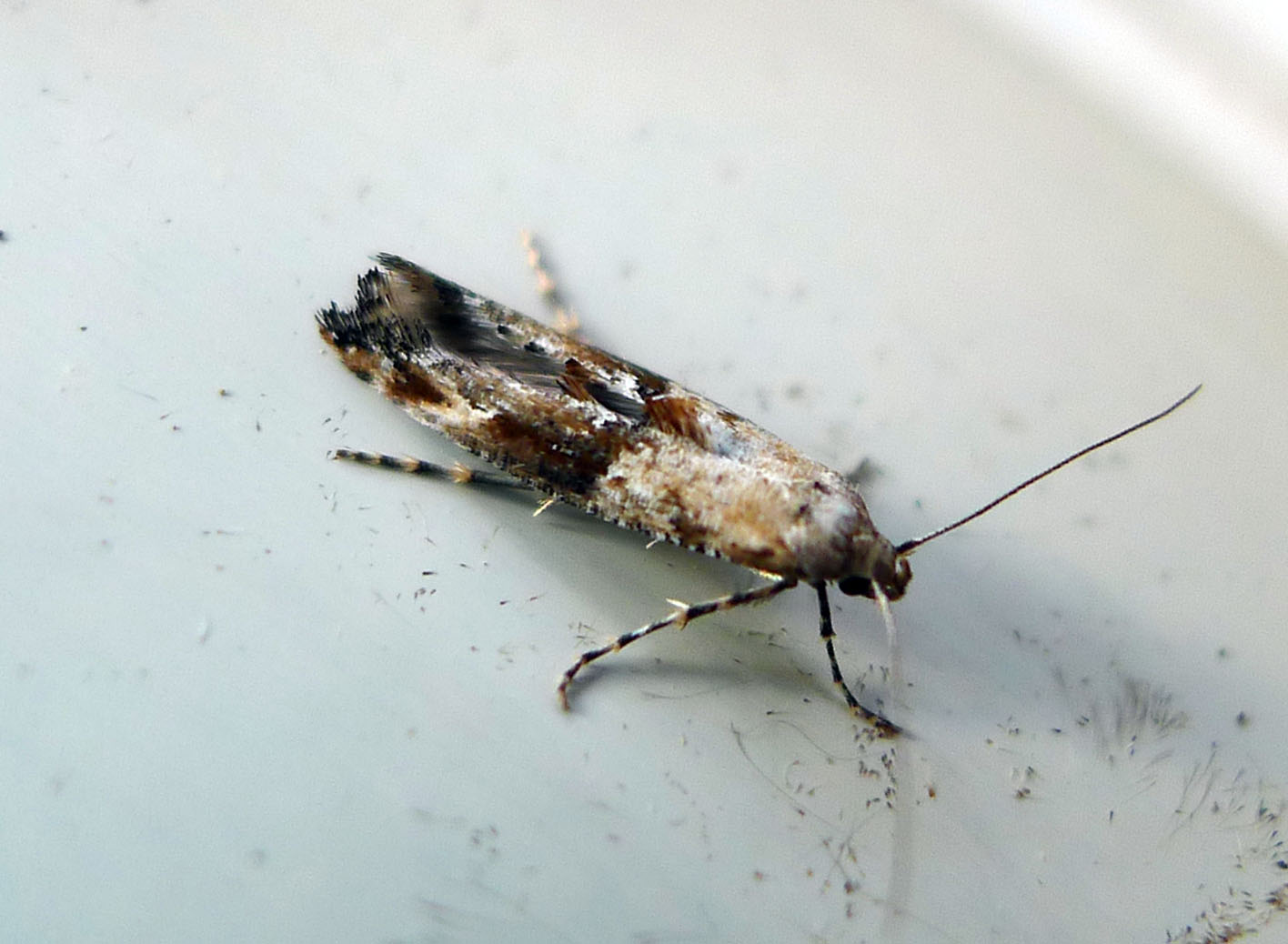

Scientific classification
- Kingdom: Animalia
- Phylum: Arthropoda
- Clade: Pancrustacea
- Class: Insecta
- Order: Lepidoptera
- Family: Epermeniidae
- Genus: Epermenia
- Species: E. chaerophyllella

Binomial name
- Epermenia chaerophyllella (Goeze, 1783)

Synonyms
- Phalaena chaerophyllella Goeze, 1783; Tinea testaceella Hübner, [1313]; Lophonotus fasciculellus Stephens, 1834; Chauliodus nigrostriatellus Heylaerts, 1883; Epermenia turatiella Costantini, 1923

= Epermenia chaerophyllella =

Species of moth

Epermenia chaerophyllella, also known as the garden lance-wing, is a moth of the family Epermeniidae first described by Johann August Ephraim Goeze in 1783. It is found in all of Europe and Asia Minor.

== Description ==
The wingspan is 12–14 mm. Adults are blackish, chestnut and whitish. There are two to three generations per year with the last generation of adults overwintering. Meyrick- Forewings brown, mixed with whitish and more or less sprinkled with black, on costa strigulated with black; a black inwardly oblique fascia from costa before middle, followed by a darker brown suffusion; beyond this two white dots placed longitudinally in disc, sometimes connected by a black spot; an irregular black spot on costa towards apex; four dorsal scale-teeth, first two ochreous brown, others black; dark line of cilia subfalcate at apex. Hindwings grey. Larva yellow-whitish or green-whitish; dorsal line whiter; spots brownish; head pale brown.Epermenia aequidentellus looks similar, but has narrower forewings without a hooked apex.

Ova

Eggs are laid between April and September on the underside of a mature leaf of a plant from the Umbelliferae family, often near the edge.

Larvae can be found from May to June and again from August to September. The body sometimes appear translucent and can be glossy white, yellow or greenish, with black or brown spots and a whitish dorsal line. The head is pale brown. There are five instars. Larva of Epermenia aequidentellus found on wild carrot (Daucus carota) have a dark dorsal line and a black head.

Moths can be found in all months of the year. They are most abundant from October to May and in July and August.

The larvae feed on various Apiaceae species, including ground elder (Aegopodium podagraria), garden angelica (Angelica archangelica litoralis), angelica (Angelica sylvestris), bur-chervil (Anthriscus caucalis), chervil (Anthriscus cerefolium), cow parsley (Anthriscus sylvestris), celery (Apium graveolens), lesser water-parsnip (Berula erecta), caraway (Carum carvi), Chaerophyllum hirsutum, rough chervil (Chaerophyllum temulum), cowbane (Cicuta virosa), hemlock (Conium maculatum), wild carrot (Daucus carota), giant hogweed (Heracleum mantegazzianum), hogweed (Heracleum sphondylium), lovage (Levisticum officinale), water dropwort (Oenanthe species), parsnip (Pastinaca sativa), Peucedanum species, burnet-saxifrage (Pimpinella saxifraga), moon carrot (Seseli libanotis), Silaum species, stone parsley (Sison amomum), great water-parsnip (Sium latifolium) and hedge parsleys (Torilis species).

Pupa

The light brown pupa is in an open network cocoon and is normally found in detritus on the ground or occasionally on the leaf, or in a petiole groove.

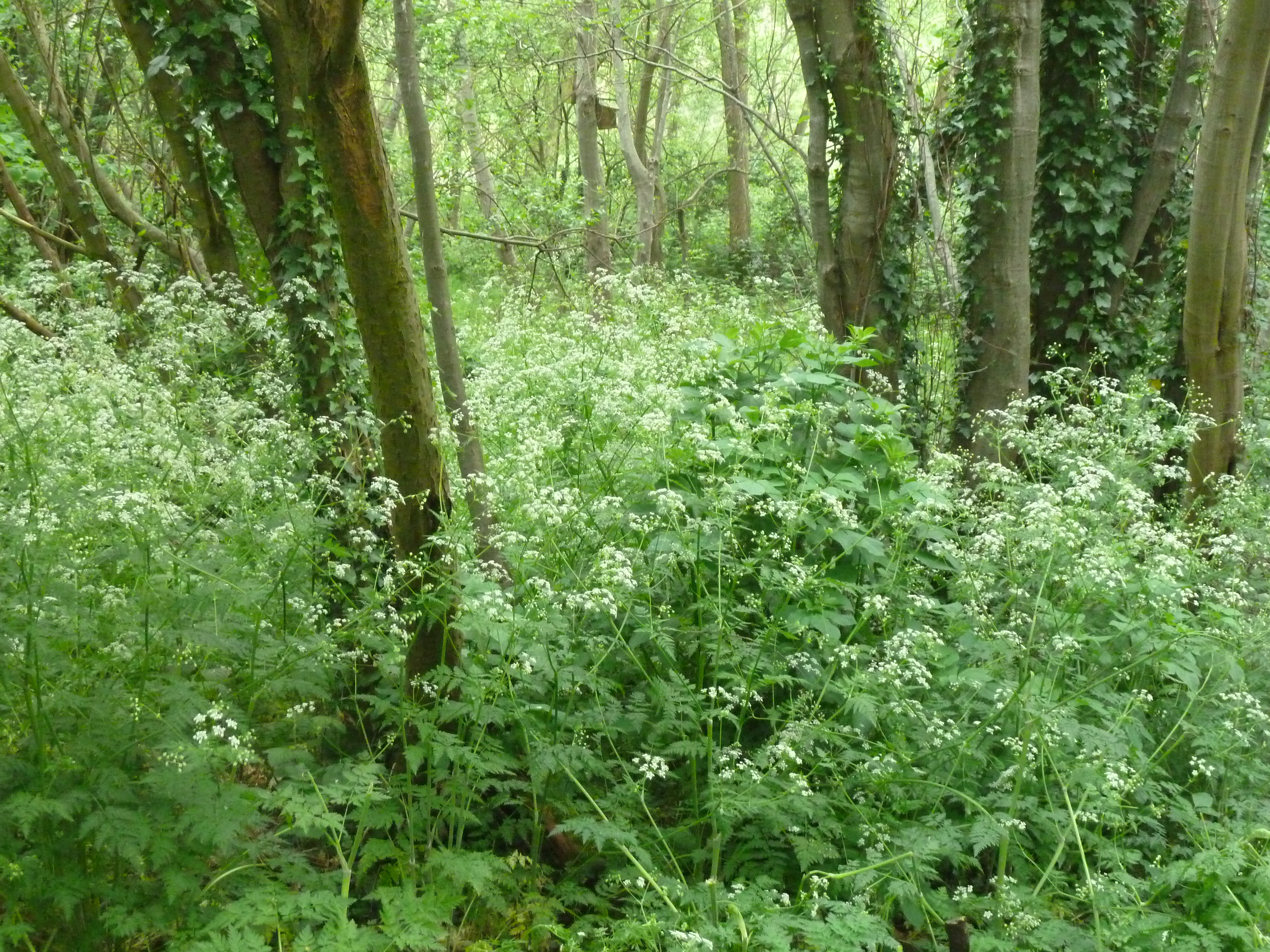
Habitat, Ireland

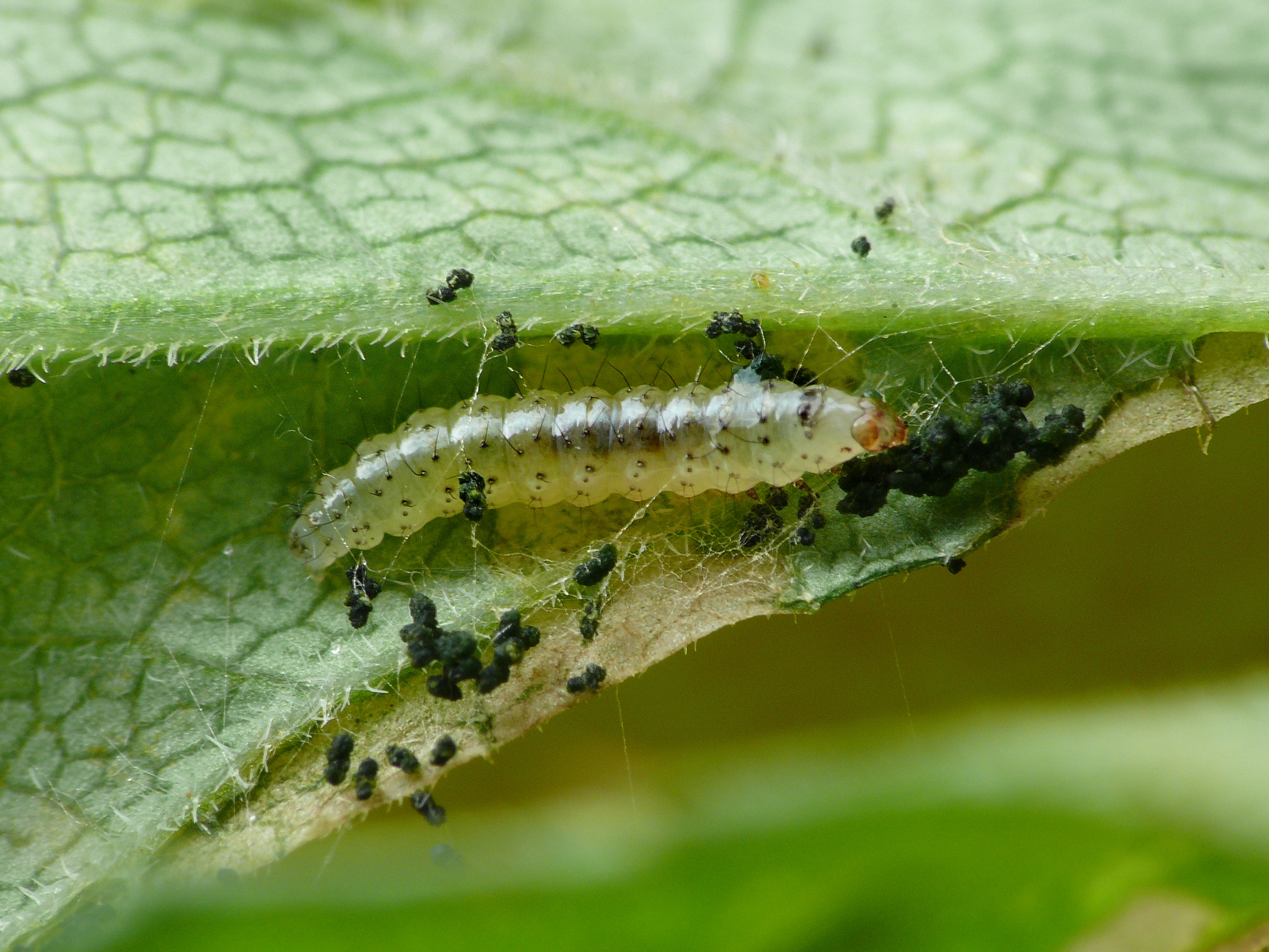
Larva (with frass)

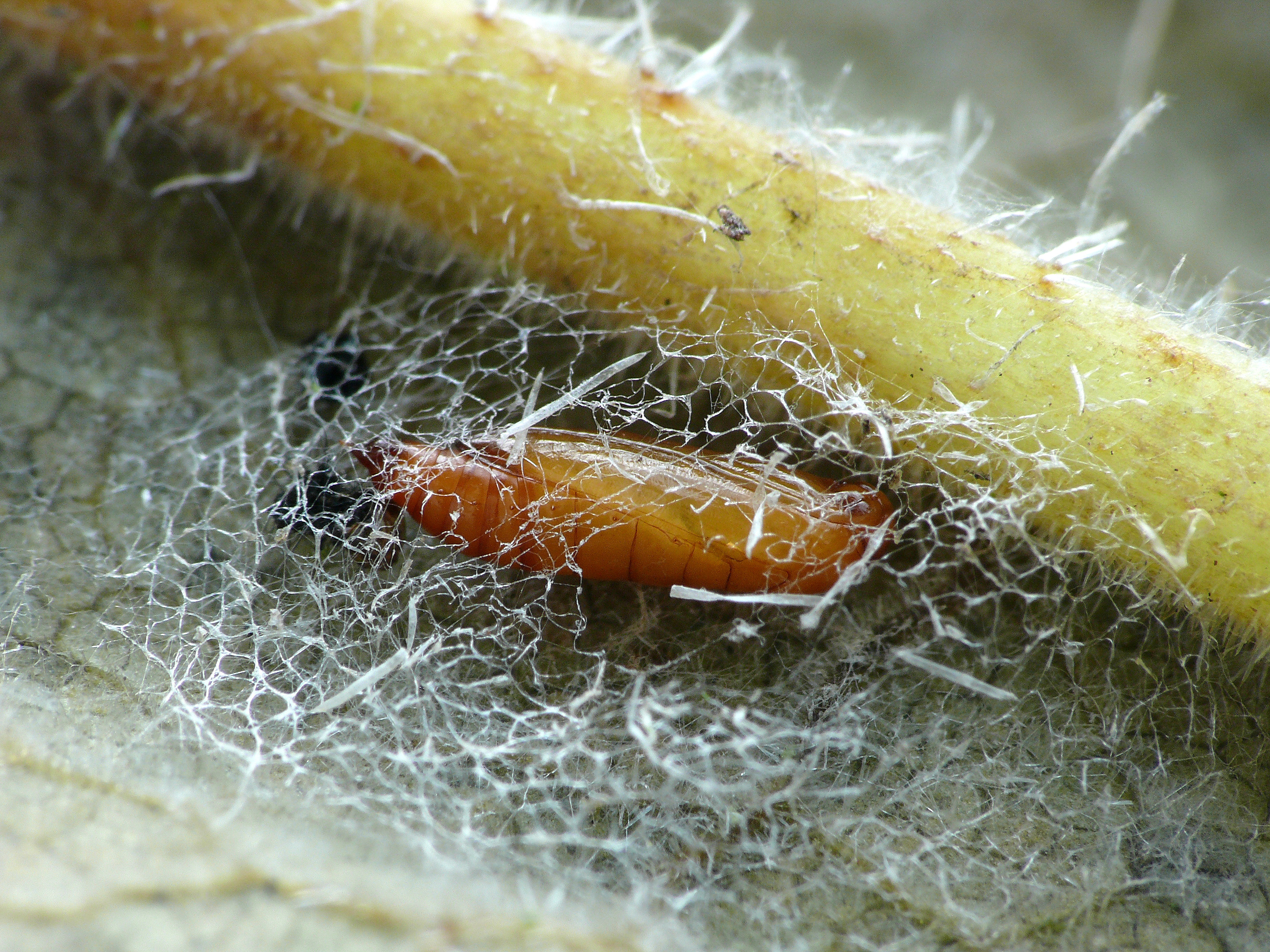
Pupa in an open network cocoon
