= Gnathifera eurybias =

Scientific classification
- Kingdom: Animalia
- Phylum: Arthropoda
- Class: Insecta
- Order: Lepidoptera
- Family: Epermeniidae
- Genus: Gnathifera
- Species: G. eurybias

Binomial name
- Gnathifera eurybias (Meyrick, 1897)

Synonyms
- Epermenia eurybias Meyrick, 1897

Species of moth

Gnathifera eurybias is a moth in the family Epermeniidae. It was described by Edward Meyrick in 1897. It is found in Australia, where it has been recorded from New South Wales, Queensland, Victoria, Tasmania and South Australia.

The wingspan is 11–15 mm. The forewings are light fuscous, irregularly strigulated with dark fuscous irroration (sprinkles) and partially finely whitish-sprinkled. There is a black dot beneath the costa near the base, and one in the disc at one-third, as well as an undefined patch of dark fuscous suffusion on the dorsum at one-fourth and a narrow indistinct dark fuscous inwardly oblique median fascia, marked with a small ochreous spot in the disc, and terminating in a large blackish dorsal scale-tooth. There is also a black dot in the disc at three-fourths, followed by a small ochreous spot. The posterior half of the costa is indistinctly spotted with dark fuscous and there is a small ochreous apical spot. The hindwings are fuscous.
