= Epermenia vartianae =

Scientific classification
- Kingdom: Animalia
- Phylum: Arthropoda
- Clade: Pancrustacea
- Class: Insecta
- Order: Lepidoptera
- Family: Epermeniidae
- Genus: Epermenia
- Species: E. vartianae

Binomial name
- Epermenia vartianae (Gaedike, 1971)

Synonyms
- Cataplectica vartianae Gaedike, 1971

Species of moth

Epermenia vartianae is a moth of the family Epermeniidae. It is found in south-eastern Afghanistan and Tajikistan.
