= Lasiostega =

Scientific classification
- Kingdom: Animalia
- Phylum: Arthropoda
- Class: Insecta
- Order: Lepidoptera
- Family: Epermeniidae
- Genus: Lasiostega; Meyrick, 1932
- Species: L. siderina

Binomial name
- Lasiostega siderina Meyrick, 1932

Genus of moths

Lasiostega is a monotypic genus of moths in the family Epermeniidae. Its only species, Lasiostega siderina, was described by Edward Meyrick in 1932. It is found in India.
