= Gnathifera (moth) =

Scientific classification
- Kingdom: Animalia
- Phylum: Arthropoda
- Clade: Pancrustacea
- Class: Insecta
- Order: Lepidoptera
- Family: Epermeniidae
- Genus: Gnathifera; Gaedike, 1978

Genus of moths

Gnathifera is a genus of moths in the family Epermeniidae.

== Species ==
- Gnathifera acacivorella Gaedike, 1968 (originally in Ochromolopis) (Australia)
- Gnathifera aphronesa (Meyrick, 1897) (originally in Epermenia) (Australia: Tasmania)
- Gnathifera australica (Gaedike, 1968) (originally in Ochromolopis) (Australia)
- Gnathifera bidentella (Australia)
- Gnathifera bipunctata (Gaedike, 1968) (originally in Ochromolopis) (Australia)
- Gnathifera queenslandi (Gaedike, 1968) (originally in Ochromolopis)
- Gnathifera eurybias (Meyrick, 1897) (originally in Epermenia) (Australia: Tasmania)
- Gnathifera hollowayi Gaedike, 1981
- Gnathifera opsias (Meyrick, 1897) (originally in Epermenia) (Australia: Tasmania)
- Gnathifera paraphronesa (Gaedike, 1968) (originally in Ochromolopis)
- Gnathifera paropsias (Gaedike, 1972) (originally in Ochromolopis) (Australia)
- Gnathifera proserga (Meyrick, 1913)
- Gnathifera pseudaphronesa (Gaedike, 1972) (originally in Ochromolopis) (Australia)
- Gnathifera punctata Gaedike, 2013
- Gnathifera uptonella (Gaedike, 1968) (originally in Ochromolopis) (Australia)
