= Gnathifera acacivorella =

Scientific classification
- Kingdom: Animalia
- Phylum: Arthropoda
- Clade: Pancrustacea
- Class: Insecta
- Order: Lepidoptera
- Family: Epermeniidae
- Genus: Gnathifera
- Species: G. acacivorella

Binomial name
- Gnathifera acacivorella (Gaedike, 1968)

Synonyms
- Ochromolopis acacivorella Gaedike, 1968

Species of moth

Gnathifera acacivorella is a moth in the family Epermeniidae. It was described by Reinhard Gaedike in 1968. It is found in Australia, where it has been recorded from Tasmania.

Larvae have been reported feeding in galls on Acacia species.
