= Epermenia strictellus =

Scientific classification
- Kingdom: Animalia
- Phylum: Arthropoda
- Clade: Pancrustacea
- Class: Insecta
- Order: Lepidoptera
- Family: Epermeniidae
- Genus: Epermenia
- Species: E. strictellus

Binomial name
- Epermenia strictellus (Wocke, 1867)

Synonyms
- Chauliodus strictellus Wocke, 1867; Epermenia (Calotripis) strictella; Epermenia sublimicola Meyrick, 1930; Epermenia anthracoptila Meyrick, 1931

Species of moth

Epermenia strictellus is a moth of the family Epermeniidae. It is found in Europe (from the Iberian Peninsula to Poland, Romania and the Balkan Peninsula), as well as in North Africa, from Turkey, through Kyrgyzstan and the Tuva Region to Japan.

The wingspan is 11–17 mm.
