= Picrodoxa =

Scientific classification
- Kingdom: Animalia
- Phylum: Arthropoda
- Class: Insecta
- Order: Lepidoptera
- Family: Epermeniidae
- Genus: Picrodoxa; Meyrick, 1923
- Species: P. harpodes

Binomial name
- Picrodoxa harpodes Meyrick, 1923

Genus of moths

Picrodoxa is a monotypic genus of moths in the family Epermeniidae. The only species in the genus, Picrodoxa harpodes, is found in India. Both the genus and species were first described by Edward Meyrick in 1923.

The wingspan is 16–18 mm. The forewings of the males are dark purple fuscous, while they are brownish suffusedly irrorated (sprinkled) with purple fuscous in females. There is a transverse bar of darker suffusion on the end of the cell. The hindwings are dark grey.
