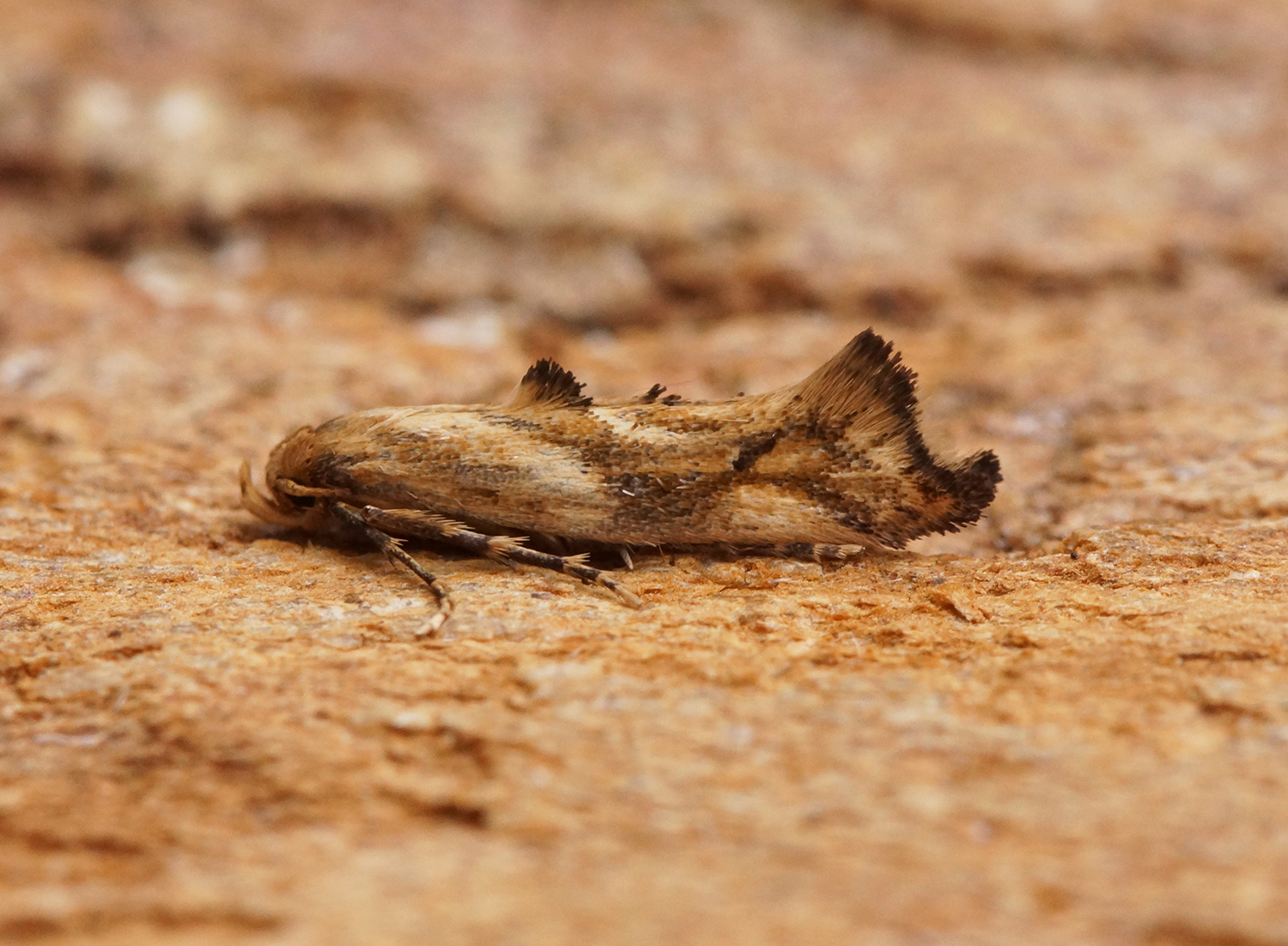

Scientific classification
- Kingdom: Animalia
- Phylum: Arthropoda
- Clade: Pancrustacea
- Class: Insecta
- Order: Lepidoptera
- Family: Epermeniidae
- Genus: Epermenia
- Species: E. falciformis

Binomial name
- Epermenia falciformis (Haworth, 1828)

Synonyms
- Recurvaria falciformis Haworth, 1828; Calotripis falciformis; Epermenia illigerella sensu auctt. nec (Hübner [1813])

= Epermenia falciformis =

Species of moth

Epermenia falciformis, also known as the large lance-wing, is a moth of the family Epermeniidae found in Europe. It was first described by Adrian Hardy Haworth in 1828.

== Description ==
The wingspan is 9–11 mm. Forewings pale ochreous; costa fuscous on anterior half; an indistinct fuscous streak from base of dorsum to beneath 1/3 of costa; a rather dark ochreous-fuscous fascia from middle of costa obliquely inwards, dilated on costa, emitting from dilation a streak to tornus; an inwardly oblique dark ochreous-fuscous spot on costa before apex; second discal stigma dark fuscous; two black dorsal scale-teeth; dark line of cilia subfalcate at apex. Hindwings dark grey. Larvae yellow-green; dorsal line darker head yellowish-brown.

Adults are on wing from June to July and again from August to September in two generations per year.

Ova are laid on angelica (Angelica sylvestris) and ground-elder (Aegopodium podagraria) in June and July, and in the Autumn. Larvae of the first generation feed in May and June in spun leaflets of their host plant, while larvae of the second generation mine a stem immediately below an umbel, causing it to droop and wither. When full grown, larvae leave via a small hole just before the junction above the main stem. Pupation takes place in an open network cocoon amongst detritus on the ground. The threads spun by the larvae are covered with minute drops of a sticky secretion.

== Distribution ==
It is found in Austria, Belgium, the Czech Republic, Denmark, France, Fennoscandia, Germany, Great Britain and Ireland, Latvia, the Netherlands and Slovakia.
