= Gnathifera opsias =

Scientific classification
- Kingdom: Animalia
- Phylum: Arthropoda
- Class: Insecta
- Order: Lepidoptera
- Family: Epermeniidae
- Genus: Gnathifera
- Species: G. opsias

Binomial name
- Gnathifera opsias (Meyrick, 1897)

Synonyms
- Epermenia opsias Meyrick, 1897

Species of moth

Gnathifera opsias is a moth in the family Epermeniidae. It was described by Edward Meyrick in 1897. It is found in Australia, where it has been recorded from Tasmania.

The wingspan is 10–14 mm. The forewings are fuscous, suffusedly irrorated (sprinkled) with white and with scattered black scales and sometimes with a small black spot beneath the fold at one-fifth. There are black dots beneath the costa at one-fifth and two-fifths, one in the disc between these, one on the fold before the middle, one in the middle of the disc often forming a short oblique transverse mark, one in the disc beyond the middle, and one at three-fourths. There are also minute black dorsal scale-teeth before and beyond the middle. The hindwings are grey.
