= Agiton =

Scientific classification
- Kingdom: Animalia
- Phylum: Arthropoda
- Class: Insecta
- Order: Lepidoptera
- Family: Epermeniidae
- Genus: Agiton; Turner, 1926
- Species: A. idioptila

Binomial name
- Agiton idioptila Turner, 1926

Genus of moths

Agiton is a monotypic moth genus in the family Epermeniidae. Its sole species, Agiton idioptila, is found in Australia, where it has been recorded from Queensland. Both the genus and species were first described by Alfred Jefferis Turner in 1926.

The wingspan is 12–14 mm. The forewings are ochreous fuscous with four, narrow, elongate ochreous-whitish costal spots, the first before the middle, the second beyond the middle, the third at three-fourths and the fourth midway between this and the apex. There is a blackish ante-apical dot in the disc, edged anteriorly with white. The hindwings are fuscous.
