= Paraepermenia =

Scientific classification
- Kingdom: Animalia
- Phylum: Arthropoda
- Clade: Pancrustacea
- Class: Insecta
- Order: Lepidoptera
- Family: Epermeniidae
- Genus: Paraepermenia; Gaedike, 1968
- Species: P. santaliella

Binomial name
- Paraepermenia santaliella Gaedike, 1968

Monotypic moth genus found in Australia

Paraepermenia is a monotypic moth genus in the family Epermeniidae described by Reinhard Gaedike in 1968. Its only species, Paraepermenia santaliella, the quandong moth, was described by the same author in the same year. It is found in Australia, where it has been recorded from Victoria.

The larvae feed on the flowers of Santalum acuminatum (quandong).
