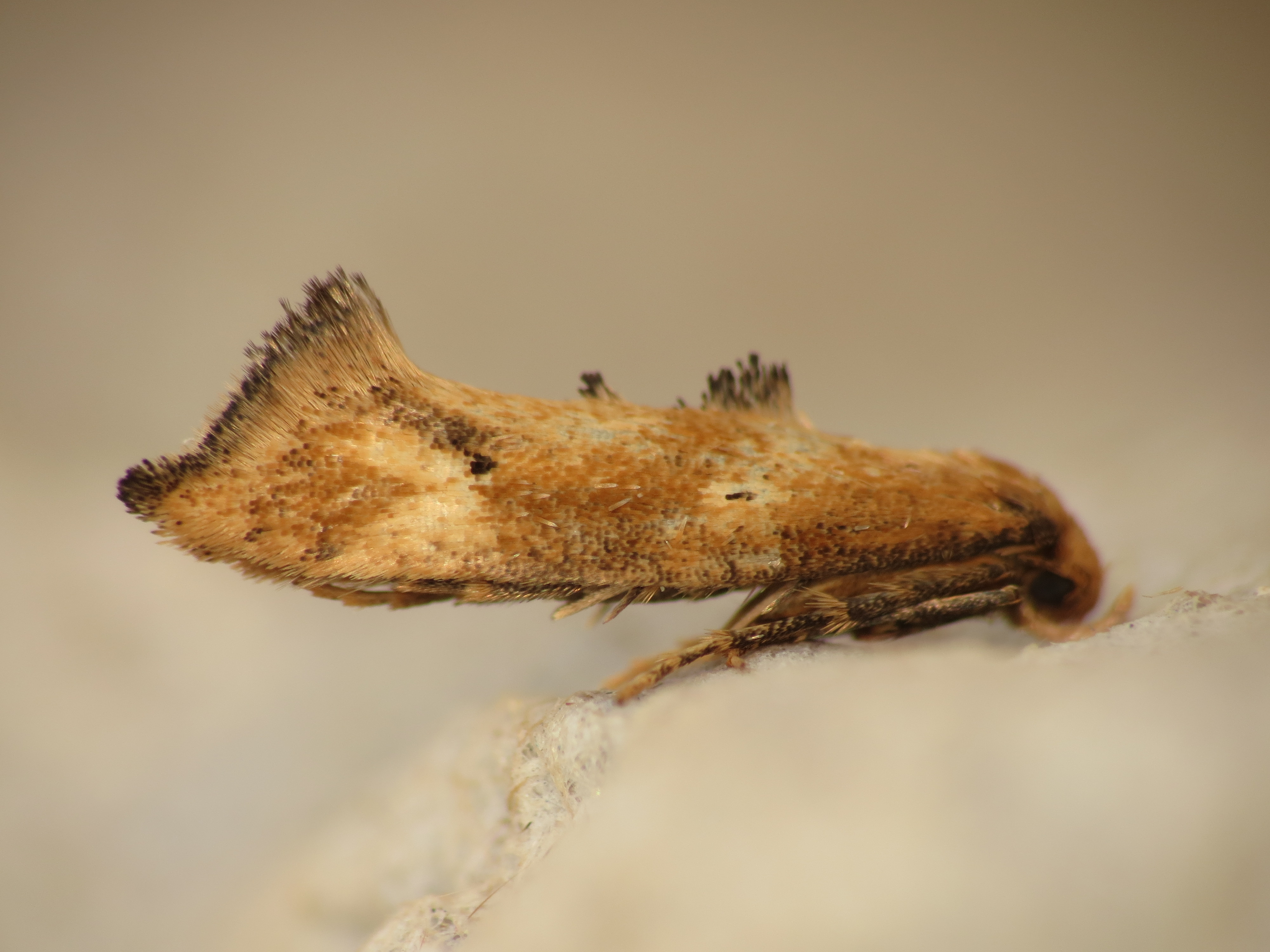
- Epermenia illigerella

Scientific classification
- Kingdom: Animalia
- Phylum: Arthropoda
- Clade: Pancrustacea
- Class: Insecta
- Order: Lepidoptera
- Infraorder: Heteroneura
- Clade: Eulepidoptera
- Clade: Ditrysia
- Clade: Apoditrysia
- Superfamily: Epermenioidea; Minet, 1983
- Family: Epermeniidae; Spuler, 1910

Diversity
- About 83 species

= Epermeniidae =

Family of moths

Epermeniidae or the fringe-tufted moths is a family of insects in the lepidopteran order with about 14 genera. Previously they have been divided in two subfamilies Epermeniinae and Ochromolopinae (e.g. Common, 1990: 321) but this is no longer maintained since the last group is probably hierarchically nested within the first (Dugdale et al., 1999). They are presently placed in their own superfamily but have previously been placed among the Yponomeutoidea or Copromorphoidea with which they share some features. Their systematic placement among the apoditrysian group "Obtectomera" (having pupal segments I-IV immobile) is however uncertain. They show some morphological similarities to the "plume moths" (Alucitoidea and Pterophoroidea), for example the wing fringe has similar groups of scales (Dugdale et al., 1999). There are also some similarities to Schreckensteinioidea, for example spiny legs and at least in some species an open-network cocoon. The genus Thambotricha from New Zealand may be the sister group of all other extant members. The most important genera are Epermenia, Ochromolopis and Gnathifera. The group has been extensively revised and catalogued by Dr Reinhard Gaedike (e.g. Gaedike, 1977, 1979).

== Identification ==
Epermeniidae are small narrow-winged moths, having a span of 7–20 mm, with conspicuous whorls of bristles on their legs, lacking spines on the abdomen unlike some similar moths. The smoothly scaled head bears no ocelli or "chaetosemata". They are most easily confused with Stathmopodinae (Oecophoridae), which unlike epermeniids have the tarsi of the forelegs and midlegs without the whorls of spines, and whose proboscis is scaled at the base. The projecting scale tufts on the inner margin of the hindwing is the easiest field character (Common, 1990).

== Distribution ==
Epermeniidae occur worldwide in both temperate and tropical regions and especially in montane areas, but are sparsely known from the Afrotropics. Gnathifera occurs from Australia to New Caledonia; Epermenia ranges from the Palaearctic to Indo-Australia and the Pacific islands.

== Behaviour ==
Epermeniidae are nocturnal as adults and well-camouflaged. They rest parallel to the surface with their wings held over their back in a tent-like manner (Robinson et al., 1994).

== Biology ==
The caterpillars feed inside almost any plant parts (fruits, seeds, galls, leaves or flowers), sometimes in a mine or sometimes exposed or under silk on the leaf surface; unlike some Lepidoptera the pupa is not extruded from the cocoon, and may be found in its fine open-network cocoon on the plant or amongst debris on the ground.

== Host plants ==
Many species in Europe feed on umbels of Apiaceae, and Epermenia chaerophyllella is a pest of cultivated species. Other species feed on the parasitic plant families Santalaceae (e.g. the Australian quandong moth) and Loranthaceae, or on Pinaceae, Pittosporaceae and Leguminosae.

== Systematics ==
- Africepermenia Gaedike, 2004
- Agiton Turner, 1926
- Epermenia Hübner, 1825
  - =Acanthedra Meyrick, 1917
  - =Calotripis Hübner, 1825
  - =Chauliodus Treitschke, 1833
  - =Epermeniola Gaedike, 1968
  - =Lophonotus Stephens, 1829
  - =Tichotripis Hübner, 1825
  - =Epimarptis Meyrick, 1914
  - =Temeluchella T. B. Fletcher, 1940
  - =Temelucha Meyrick, 1909
  - =Cataplectica Walsingham, 1894
  - =Heydenia Hofmann, 1868
- Gnathifera Gaedike, 1978
- Inuncus Gaedike, 2013
- Lasiostega Meyrick, 1932
- Mesepermenia Gaedike, 2004
- Notodryas Meyrick, 1897
- Ochromolopis Hübner, 1825
- Parochromolopis Gaedike, 1977
- Paraepermenia Gaedike, 1968
- Phaulernis Meyrick, 1895
- Picrodoxa Meyrick, 1923
- Sinicaepermenia Heppner, 1990
- Thambotricha Meyrick, 1922

== Sources ==
- Firefly Encyclopedia of Insects and Spiders, edited by Christopher O'Toole, ISBN 1-55297-612-2, 2002
