= List of moths of India (Tineidae) =

This is a list of moths of the families Epermeniidae, Eriocottidae, Tineidae and Tischeriidae that are found in India. It also acts as an index to the species articles and forms part of the full List of moths of India.

== Family Epermeniidae ==
- Epermenia leucomantis Meyrick, 1917
- Epermenia macescens Meyrick, 1917
- Ochromolopis chelyodes (Meyrick, 1910)

== Eriocottidae ==
- Dacryphanes cyanastra Meyrick, 1907

== Family Tineidae ==
- Amphixystis gyracma (Meyrick, 1915)
- Amphixystis oxymoris (Meyrick, 1916)
- Amphixystis protelesta (Meyrick, 1915)
- Amphixystis rotata (Meyrick, 1915)
- Amphixystis thapsonota (Meyrick, 1915)
- Cervaria xylinella Walker, 1866
- Cimitra seclusella Walker, 1864
- Cladarodes peloptera Meyrick, 1910
- Crypsithyris fissella
- Crypsithyris longicornis
- Crypsithyris mesodyas Meyrick, 1907
- Dasyses rugosella
- Drimylastis telamonia
- Edosa opsigona ( Meyrick, 1911)
- Epactris alcaea
- Erechthias dissimulans
- Erechthias heliotoxa
- Erechthias lampadacma
- Erechthias melanostropha
- Erechthias minuscula (Walsingham, 1897)
- Erechthias pachygramma
- Erechthias scorpiura
- Erechthias spodomicta
- Eucrotala nucleata
- Eudarcia celidopa
- Eudarcia cuniculata
- Eudarcia deferens
- Gaphara plana
- Gerontha captiosella
- Graphicoptila dissociata (Meyrick, 1922)
- Haplotinea insectella (Fabricius, 1794)
- Harmaclona tephrantha
- Hyladaula claviformis
- Hyladaula perniciosa
- Ippa inceptrix (Meyrick, 1916)
- Ippa lepras (Meyrick, 1917)
- Ippa megalopa (Meyrick, 1915)
- Ippa plana (Meyrick, 1920)
- Ippa sollicata (Meyrick, 1917)
- Ippa vacivella Walker, 1864
- Kangerosithyris kotomsarensis Skalski, 1992
- Machaeropteris encotopa Meyrick, 1922
- Machaeropteris synaphria Meyrick, 1922
- Machaeropteris turbata Meyrick, 1922
- Monopis crocicapitella (Clemens, 1859)
- Monopis dicycla Meyrick, 1910
- Monopis longella (Walker, 1863)
- Monopis monachella (Hübner, 1796)
- Monopis trimaculella
- Monopis sertifera Meyrick, 1910
- Morophaga sistrata
- Nemapogon asyntacta (Meyrick, 1917)
- Opogona aemula Meyrick, 1915
- Opogona anaclina Meyrick, 1915
- Opogona chalinota Meyrick, 1910
- Opogona choleropis Meyrick, 1920 (Andaman)
- Opogona citriseca Meyrick, 1928 (Andaman)
- Opogona clinomima (Meyrick, 1918)
- Opogona dramatica Meyrick, 1911
- Opogona elaitis Meyrick, 1911
- Opogona flavofasciata (Stainton, 1859)
- Opogona fumiceps
- Opogona hylarcha Meyrick, 1928
- Opogona iolychna (Meyrick, 1920)
- Opogona isoclina Meyrick, 1907
- Opogona isotalanta Meyrick, 1930
- Opogona lamprocrossa Meyrick, 1928 (Andaman)
- Opogona liparopis Meyrick, 1922
- Opogona loculata Meyrick, 1915
- Opogona lutigena Meyrick, 1915
- Opogona molybdis Meyrick, 1915
- Opogona monosticta (Meyrick, 1915)
- Opogona pandora Meyrick, 1911
- Opogona percnodes Meyrick, 1910
- Opogona praecincta Meyrick, 1916
- Opogona protographa Meyrick, 1911
- Opogona protomima (Meyrick, 1918)
- Opogona sacchari (Bojer, 1856)
- Opogona scabricoma Meyrick, 1934
- Opogona succulenta Meyrick, 1931 (Andaman)
- Opogona taochroa Meyrick, 1934
- Opogona tergemina Meyrick, 1915
- Opogona xanthocrita Meyrick, 1911
- Opogona zygodonta Meyrick, 1931
- Oxylychna euryzona Meyrick 1920
- Peristactis taraxias Meyrick, 1916
- Phaeoses chalinota (Meyrick, 1910)
- Phereoeca allutella Rebel, 1892
- Phereoeca spharagistis (Meyrick, 1911)
- Phereoeca uterella (Walsingham, 1897)
- Platysceptra corticina (T. B. Fletcher, 1921)
- Platysceptra tineoides (Walsingham, 1886)
- Proterospastis inquisitrix
- Pyloetis mimosae (Stainton, 1859)
- Rhinophyllis dasychiras Meyrick, 1936
- Scalmatica albofasciella (Stainton 1859)
- Scalmatica rhicnopa Meyrick, 1919
- Setomorpha rutella Zeller, 1852
- Tinea antricola Meyrick, 1924
- Tinea cherota
- Tinea nestoria Stainton
- Tinea pellionella (Linnaeus, 1758)
- Tinea pyrosoma Meyrick, 1924
- Tinea subalbidella
- Tineovertex antidroma
- Trachycentra elaeotropha
- Trachytyla xylophthora (Meyrick, 1922)
- Trichophaga robinsoni Gaedike & Karsholt, 2001
- Trichophaga mormopis Meyrick, 1935
- Trichophaga tapetzella (Linnaeus, 1758)
- Trissochyta acraspis
- Wegneria cerodelta (Meyrick, 1911)
- Wegneria encharacta (Meyrick, 1915)
- Wegneria impotens (Meyrick, 1915)
- Wegneria lachanitis (Meyrick, 1906)
- Wegneria oxydesma (Meyrick, 1918)
- Wegneria plasturga (Meyrick, 1911)
- Wegneria spherotoma (Meyrick, 1911)

== Tischeriidae ==
- Tischeria ptarmica Meyrick, 1908
