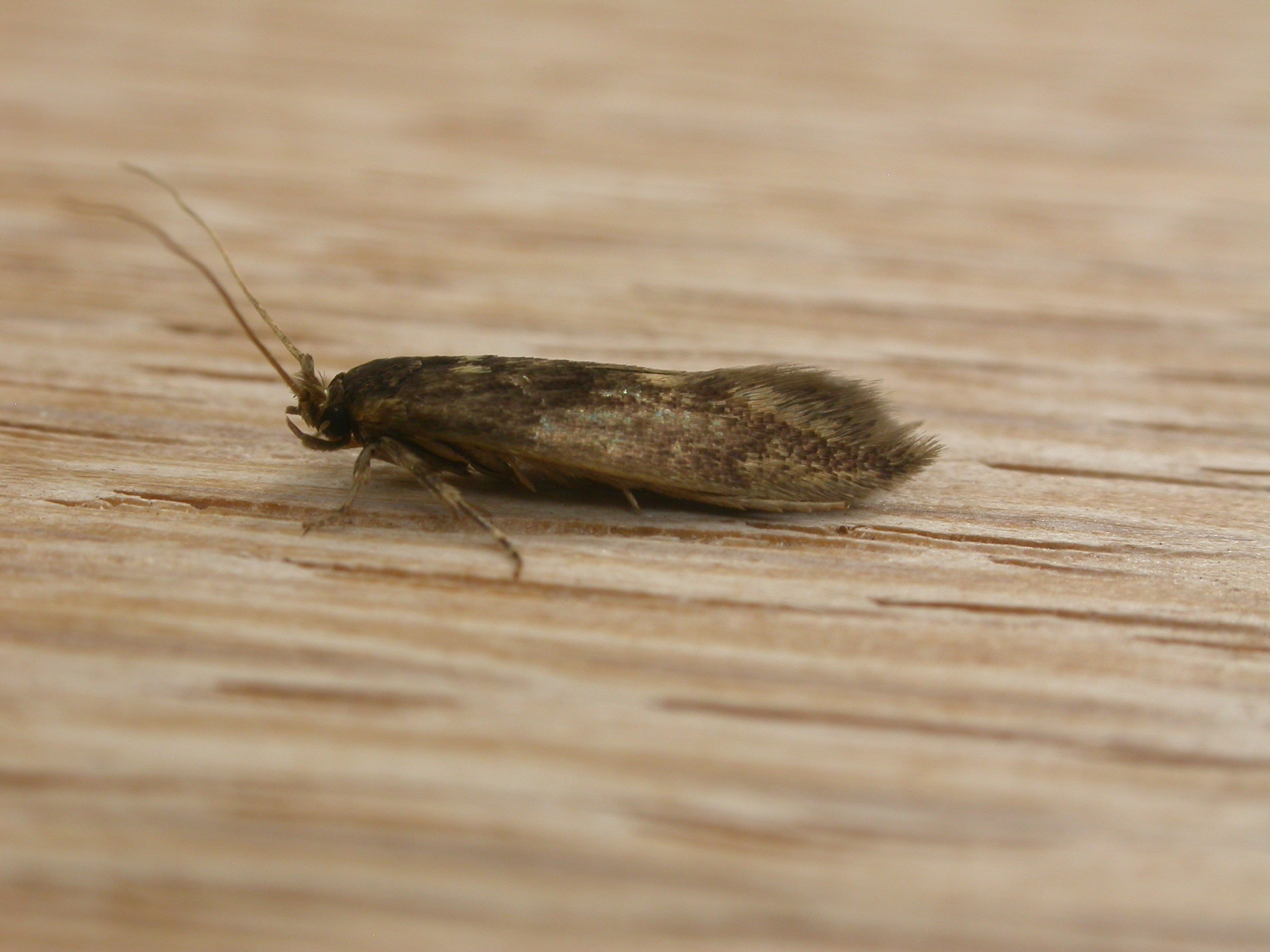
- Opogona omoscopa imago from Aranda, Australian Capital Territory

Scientific classification
- Kingdom: Animalia
- Phylum: Arthropoda
- Clade: Pancrustacea
- Class: Insecta
- Order: Lepidoptera
- Family: Tineidae
- Subfamily: Hieroxestinae
- Genus: Opogona; Zeller, 1853

Type species
- Opogona dimidiatella Zeller, 1853

Species
- Numerous, see text

Synonyms
- Numerous, see text

= Opogona =

Genus of moths

Opogona is a genus of the fungus moth family, Tineidae. Therein, it belongs to the subfamily Hieroxestinae. As it includes Opogona omoscopa, the type species of the now-abolished genus Hieroxestis, it is the type genus of its subfamily.

They are most common in the tropical parts of the world; for example, from Australia, almost thirty species are known. Two members of this genus – the banana moth (O. sacchari) and to a lesser extent O. omoscopa – have been introduced to Europe.

== Selected species ==
The numerous species of Opogona include:

- Opogona aemula Meyrick, 1915 (India)
- Opogona amphicausta Meyrick, 1907 (Sri Lanka)
- Opogona anaclina Meyrick, 1915 (India)
- Opogona antistacta Meyrick, 1937 (neotropical, Colombia, Cuba)
- Opogona arizonensis Davis, 1978
- Opogona asema (Turner, 1900) (Australia)
- Opogona aurisquamosa Butler, 1881 (from Pacific, Society islands, Marquesas, Fiji, Kermadec Islands, Hawaii)
- Opogona autogama (Meyrick, 1911) (Seychelles)
- Opogona basilissa (Turner, 1917) (Australia)
- Opogona bicolorella (Matsumura, 1931)
- Opogona calculata Meyrick, 1919 (Australia)
- Opogona caryospila Meyrick, 1920
- Opogona cataclasta Meyrick, 1915
- Opogona chalinota Meyrick, 1910 (India)
- Opogona choleropis Meyrick, 1920 (Andaman)
- Opogona chrysophanes Meyrick, 1915
- Opogona citrolopha Meyrick, 1932
- Opogona citriseca Meyrick, 1928 (Andaman)
- Opogona cleonyma (Meyrick, 1897)
- Opogona clinomima (Meyrick, 1918) (India)
- Opogona comptella (Walker, 1864) (Australia/New Zealand)
- Opogona confinis Turner, 1926 (Australia)
- Opogona conjurata (Meyrick, 1920)
- Opogona crypsipyra Turner, 1923 (Australia)
- Opogona dimidiatella Zeller, 1853
- Opogona discordia J.F.G.Clarke, 1986
- Opogona doxophanes Meyrick, 1915 (Sri Lanka)
- Opogona dramatica Meyrick, 1911 (India)
- Opogona elaitis Meyrick, 1911 (India)
- Opogona fascigera Meyrick, 1915
- Opogona fatima Meyrick, 1921 (Australia)
- Opogona flavofasciata (Stainton, 1859) (India to Philippines)
- Opogona floridensis Davis, 1978 (Florida)
- Opogona fumiceps (India, Sri Lanka)
- Opogona glycyphaga Meyrick, 1915 (Australia)
- Opogona hylarcha Meyrick, 1928 (India)
- Opogona icterica Meyrick, 1915 (Philippines)
- Opogona iolychna (Meyrick, 1920) (India)
- Opogona isoclina Meyrick, 1907 (India)
- Opogona isotalanta Meyrick, 1930
- Opogona lamprocrossa Meyrick, 1928 (Andaman)
- Opogona lamprophanes Meyrick, 1915 (Sri Lanka)
- Opogona liparopis Meyrick, 1922 (India)
- Opogona loculata Meyrick, 1915 (India)
- Opogona lutigena Meyrick, 1915 (India)
- Opogona micranthes (Meyrick, 1897) (Australia)
- Opogona molybdis Meyrick, 1915 (India)
- Opogona monosticta (Meyrick, 1915) (India)
- Opogona nebularis (Meyrick, 1897) (Australia)
- Opogona nipponica Stringer, 1930
- Opogona omoscopa Meyrick, 1893
- Opogona orchestris Meyrick, 1911 (Sri Lanka)
- Opogona orthotis (Meyrick, 1897)
- Opogona pandora Meyrick, 1911 (India)
- Opogona praecincta Meyrick, 1916 (India)
- Opogona promalacta Meyrick, 1915 (Australia)
- Opogona protographa Meyrick, 1911 (India)
- Opogona protomima (Meyrick, 1918) (India)
- Opogona papayae Turner, 1923 (Australia)
- Opogona percnodes Meyrick, 1910 (India)
- Opogona psola Bradley, 1956 (Norfolk Island)
- Opogona praestans (Walsingham, 1892) (St.Vincent)
- Opogona promalacta Meyrick, 1915 (Australia)
- Opogona protodoxa (Meyrick, 1897) (Australia)
- Opogona regressa Meyrick, 1916
- Opogona rhynchacma Meyrick, 1920 (Brazil)
- Opogona sacchari (Bojer, 1856) (Seychelles, Cape Verde, Réunion, Mauritius, Madagascar, St.Helena; introduced:Brazil, Central America, Europe, Florida, Bermuda, Japan, Portugal (Madeira); Spain (Canary Islands))
- Opogona sarophila Meyrick, 1915 (Australia)
- Opogona scabricoma Meyrick, 1934 (India)
- Opogona scalena (Meyrick, 1897) (Australia)
- Opogona simoniella (Wallengren, 1861) (Cocos Keeling)
- Opogona stathmota Meyrick, 1911 (Sri Lanka)
- Opogona stenocraspeda (Meyrick, 1897) (Australia)
- Opogona stereodyta (Meyrick, 1897) (Australia)
- Opogona succulenta Meyrick, 1931 (Andaman)
- Opogona taochroa Meyrick, 1934
- Opogona tanydora Meyrick, 1920 (Kenya)
- Opogona tetrasema (Turner, 1917) (Australia)
- Opogona tergemina Meyrick, 1915 (India)
- Opogona thiadelpha Meyrick, 1934
- Opogona trachyclina Meyrick, 1935
- Opogona transversata Bippus, 2016 (Reunion)
- Opogona trichoceros Meyrick, 1930
- Opogona trigonomis Meyrick, 1907 (Sri Lanka)
- Opogona trissostacta Meyrick, 1934
- Opogona tristicta (Meyrick, 1897) (Australia)
- Opogona trophis Meyrick, 1913 (South Africa)
- Opogona ursella (Walker, 1875) (St.Helena)
- Opogona vilis (Wollaston E., 1879) (St.Helena)
- Opogona xanthocrita Meyrick, 1911
- Opogona zygodonta Meyrick, 1931 (India)

Some species have been removed from the present genus. For example, O. panchalcella is now in Wegneria.

== Synonyms ==
Groups of these moths have been proposed for separation in distinct genera. Here however, the genus is considered to contain the core group of Hieroxestinae and is thus delimited sensu lato. Junior synonyms and other invalid scientific names of Opogona are:

- Cachura Walker, 1864
- Conchyliospila Wallengren, 1861
- Conchyliopsila (lapsus)
- Dendroneura Walsingham, 1892
- Exala Meyrick, 1912
- Hieroxestis Meyrick, 1893
- Lozostoma Stainton, 1859
- Loxostoma (lapsus nec Bivona-Bernardi 1838: preoccupied)
- Lissocarena Turner, 1923
