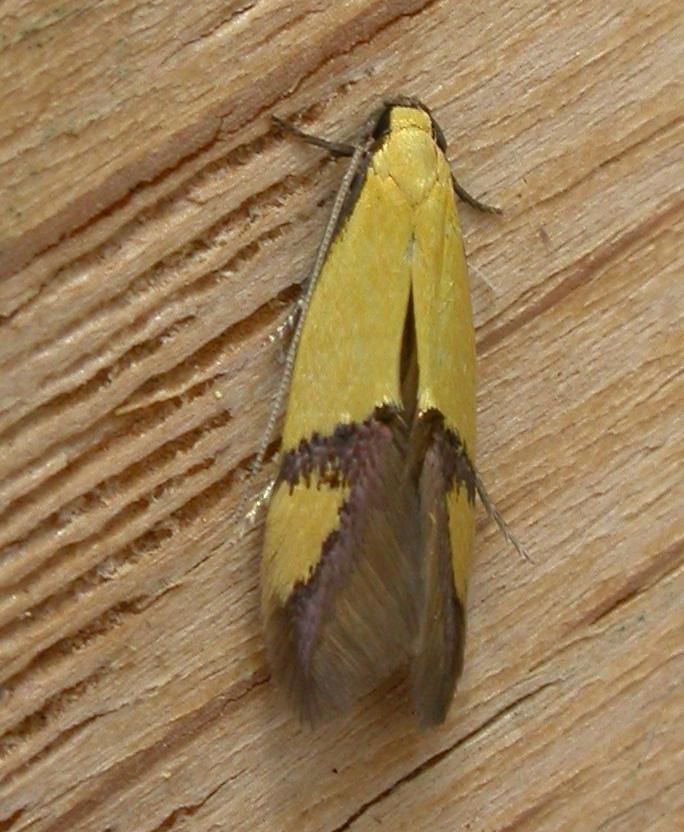
- Opogona stereodyta

Scientific classification
- Kingdom: Animalia
- Phylum: Arthropoda
- Clade: Pancrustacea
- Class: Insecta
- Order: Lepidoptera
- Family: Tineidae
- Subfamily: Hieroxestinae; Meyrick, 1893

Synonyms
- Dendroneurinae Walsingham, 1892; Oenophilidae Spuler, 1898

= Hieroxestinae =

Subfamily of moths

The Hieroxestinae are a subfamily of moths of the family Tineidae.

== Genera ==
- Amphixystis
- Archemitra
- Asymplecta
- Crobylophanes Meyrick, 1938
- Kermania
- Mitrogona Meyrick, 1920
- Oinophila
- Opogona
- Phaeoses
- Phruriastis
- Tineomigma Gozmány, 2004
- Wegneria
