= G. bidentata =

G. bidentata may refer to:

- Gnathifera bidentata, a fringe-tufted moth
- Gonomyia bidentata, a crane fly
- Gynoplistia bidentata, a crane fly
