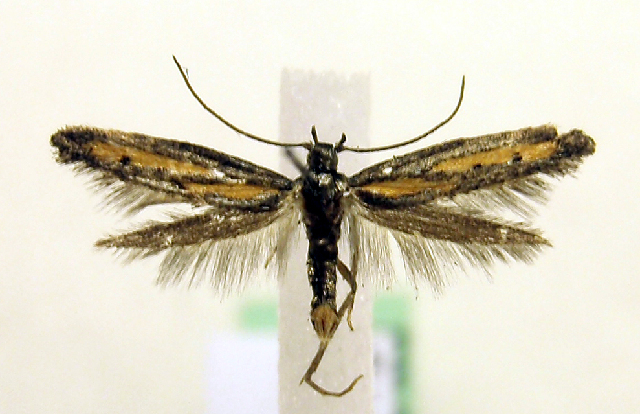
- Ochromolopis ictella

Scientific classification
- Kingdom: Animalia
- Phylum: Arthropoda
- Clade: Pancrustacea
- Class: Insecta
- Order: Lepidoptera
- Family: Epermeniidae
- Genus: Ochromolopis; Hübner, 1824

Synonyms
- Temelucha Meyrick, 1909; Temeluchella T. B. Fletcher, 1940

= Ochromolopis =

Genus of moths

Ochromolopis is a genus of moths in the family Epermeniidae described by Jacob Hübner in 1824.

== Species ==
- Ochromolopis cana Gaedike, 2013
- Ochromolopis chelyodes (Meyrick, 1910) (originally in Epermenia)
- Ochromolopis cornutifera Gaedike, 1968 (Australia)
- Ochromolopis ictella (Hübner, 1813) (originally in Tinea)
- Ochromolopis incrassa Clarke, 1971
- Ochromolopis ithycentra (Meyrick, 1926)
- Ochromolopis kaszabi Gaedike, 1973
- Ochromolopis namibica Gaedike, 2004
- Ochromolopis pallida Gaedike, 2004
- Ochromolopis ramapoella (Kearfott, 1903) (originally in Epermenia)
- Ochromolopis sagittella Gaedike, 2013
- Ochromolopis staintonellus (Millière, 1869)
- Ochromolopis xeropa (Meyrick, 1909)
- Ochromolopis zagulajevi Budashkin & Satshkov, 1991

== Former species ==
- Ochromolopis acacivorella Gaedike, 1968
- Ochromolopis aphronesa (Meyrick, 1897)
- Ochromolopis australica Gaedike, 1968
- Ochromolopis bidentata (Braun, 1926) (originally in Epermenia)
- Ochromolopis bidentata Gaedike, 1968
- Ochromolopis bidentella Gaedike, 1981
- Ochromolopis bipunctata Gaedike, 1968
- Ochromolopis eurybias (Meyrick, 1897)
- Ochromolopis metrothetis (Meyrick, 1921) (originally in Epermenia)
- Ochromolopis opsias (Meyrick, 1897)
- Ochromolopis paraphronesa Gaedike, 1968
- Ochromolopis paropsias Gaedike, 1972
- Ochromolopis pseudaphronesa Gaedike, 1972
- Ochromolopis queenslandi Gaedike, 1968
- Ochromolopis uptonella Gaedike, 1969

== Status unknown ==
- Ochromolopis sericella (Hübner, 1811/17) (originally in Tinea), described from Europe
