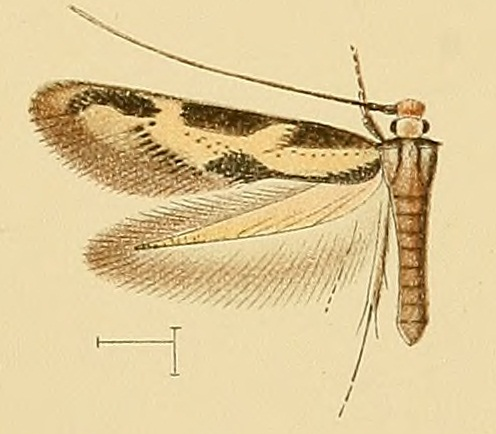
- Oinophila nesiotes

Scientific classification
- Kingdom: Animalia
- Phylum: Arthropoda
- Clade: Pancrustacea
- Class: Insecta
- Order: Lepidoptera
- Family: Tineidae
- Subfamily: Hieroxestinae
- Genus: Oinophila; Stephens, 1848

Type species
- Gracillaria v-flava Haworth, 1828

Diversity
- At least 2 species (see text)

Synonyms
- Oenophila Dunning & Pickard, 1859 (unjustified emendation)

= Oinophila =

Genus of moths

Oinophila is a small genus of the fungus moth family, Tineidae. Therein, it belongs to the subfamily Hieroxestinae.

O. v-flava, often misspelled "-flavum", is commonly known as the wine moth. Its caterpillars borrow into moist cork – such as of wine bottles stored in a damp cellar – in search of the mould which they primarily eat.

== Species ==
Oinophila is only a minor lineage in a small subfamily, but the notoriety of the well-known wine moth made it quite well known. In the past, it was thus used as a sort of "wastebin taxon" for miscellaneous Hieroxestinae. Four species remain in the genus at present, but two of these do not actually seem to belong here – they might not even be Hieroxestinae:

- Oinophila argyrospora Meyrick, 1931 (provisionally placed here)
- Oinophila nesiotes Walsingham, 1908
- Oinophila v-flava (Haworth, 1828)
- Oinophila xanthorrhabda Meyrick, 1915 (provisionally placed here)

== See also ==
- Cork moth (Nemapogon cloacella), another tineid moth occasionally feeding on cork of wine bottles.
