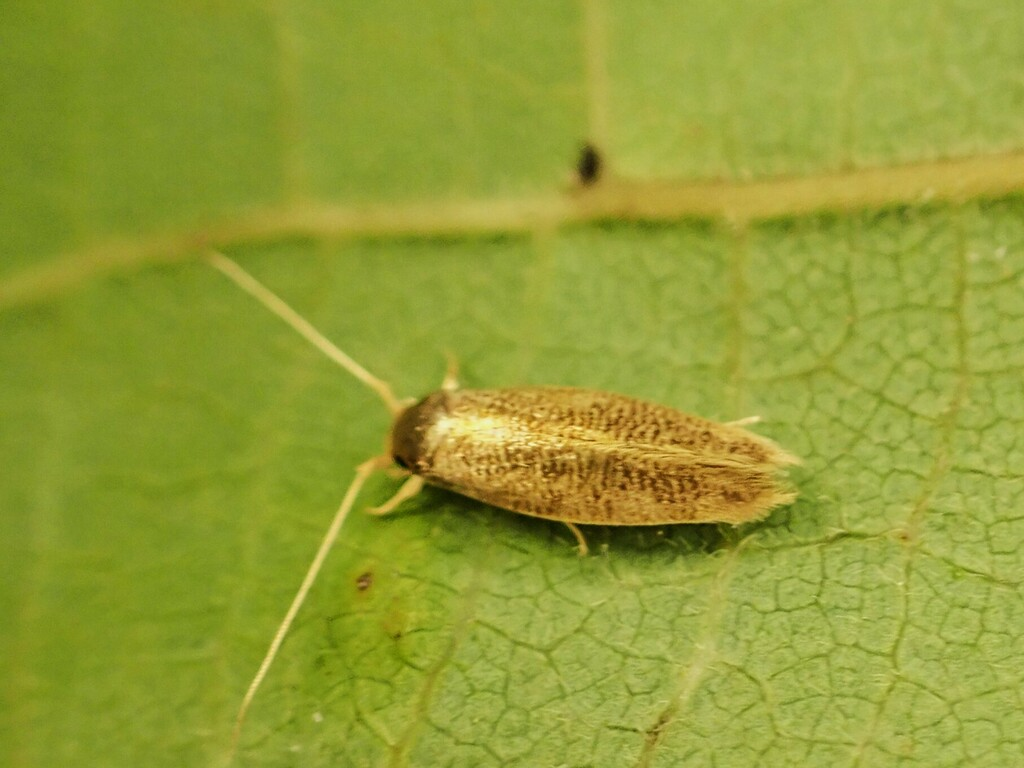

Scientific classification
- Kingdom: Animalia
- Phylum: Arthropoda
- Class: Insecta
- Order: Lepidoptera
- Family: Tineidae
- Genus: Opogona
- Species: O. aurisquamosa

Binomial name
- Opogona aurisquamosa (Butler, 1881)

Synonyms
- Argyresthia aurisquamosa Butler, 1881

= Opogona aurisquamosa =

Species of moth

Opogona aurisquamosa is a moth of the family Tineidae. It has been recorded from the Pacific, including Easter Island, the Marquesas, the Society Islands, Fiji, the Kermadec Islands and Hawaii. It may have been dispersed by the Polynesians as well as by Europeans.
