= Opogona trigonomis =

Scientific classification
- Kingdom: Animalia
- Phylum: Arthropoda
- Class: Insecta
- Order: Lepidoptera
- Family: Tineidae
- Genus: Opogona
- Species: O. trigonomis

Binomial name
- Opogona trigonomis Meyrick, 1907

Species of moth

Opogona trigonomis is a moth of the family Tineidae first described by Edward Meyrick in 1907. It is found in Sri Lanka.
