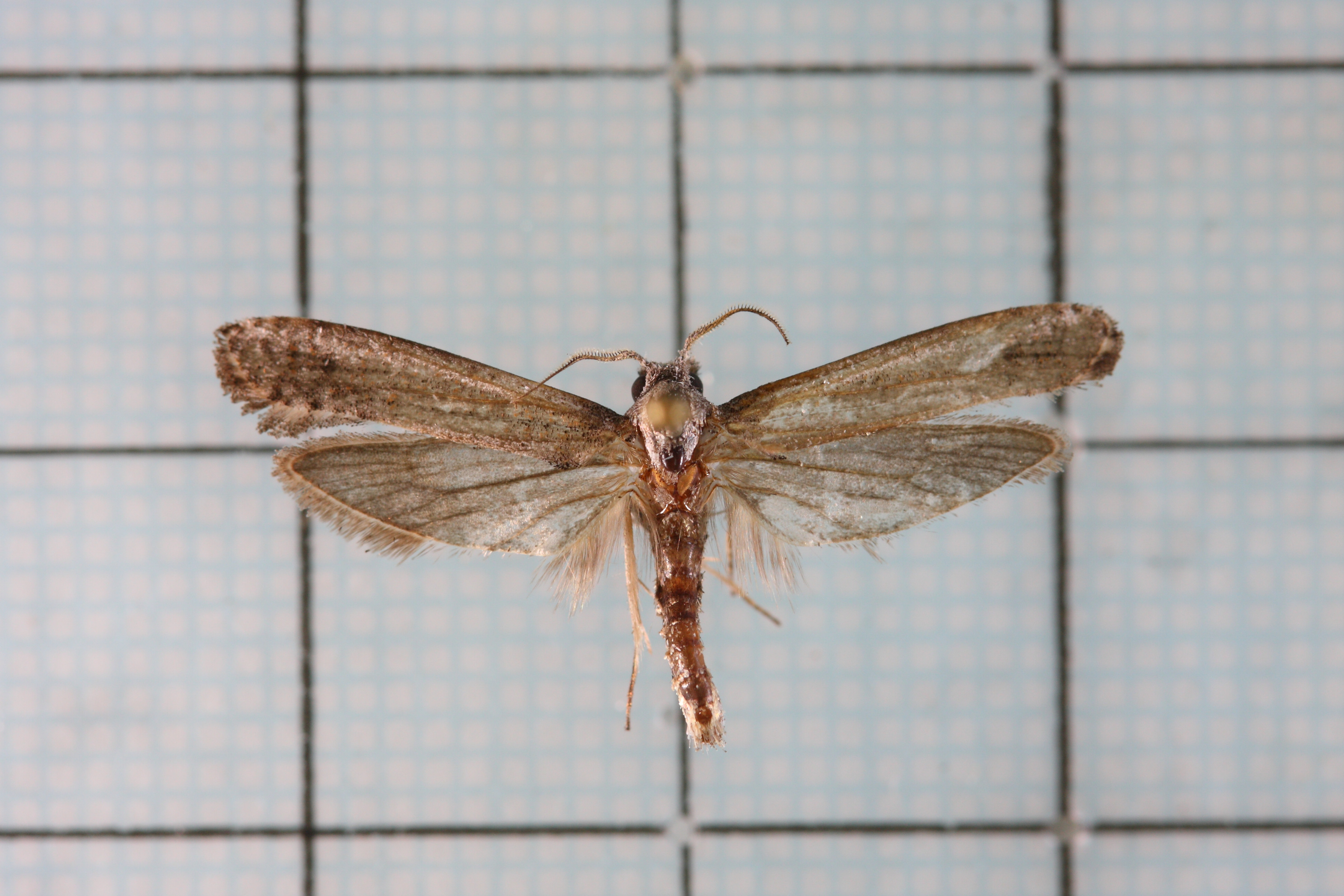
- unidentified ′′Harmaclona′′

Scientific classification
- Kingdom: Animalia
- Phylum: Arthropoda
- Clade: Pancrustacea
- Class: Insecta
- Order: Lepidoptera
- Family: Tineidae
- Subfamily: Harmacloninae; Davis, 1998

Type genus
- Harmaclona Busck, 1914

= Harmacloninae =

Subfamily of moths

The Harmacloninae are a subfamily of moth of the family Tineidae.

== Genera ==
- Harmaclona
- Micrerethista
