= Ochromolopis cornutifera =

Scientific classification
- Kingdom: Animalia
- Phylum: Arthropoda
- Clade: Pancrustacea
- Class: Insecta
- Order: Lepidoptera
- Family: Epermeniidae
- Genus: Ochromolopis
- Species: O. cornutifera

Binomial name
- Ochromolopis cornutifera Gaedike, 1968

Species of moth

Ochromolopis cornutifera is a moth in the family Epermeniidae. It was described by Reinhard Gaedike in 1968. It is found in Australia, where it has been recorded from New South Wales.
