= Ippa =

Scientific classification
- Kingdom: Animalia
- Phylum: Arthropoda
- Clade: Pancrustacea
- Class: Insecta
- Order: Lepidoptera
- Family: Tineidae
- Subfamily: Myrmecozelinae
- Genus: Ippa

Genus of moths

Ippa is a genus of moths belonging to the family Tineidae.

== Species ==
Some species are: Sri Lanka:

- Ippa polyscia (Meyrick, 1917)
- Ippa recitatella (Walker, 1864)
- Ippa taxiarcha (Meyrick, 1916)

India:

- Ippa inceptrix (Meyrick, 1916)
- Ippa lepras (Meyrick, 1917)
- Ippa megalopa (Meyrick, 1915)
- Ippa plana (Meyrick, 1920)
- Ippa sollicata (Meyrick, 1917)
- Ippa vacivella Walker, 1864
