= Opogona autogama =

Scientific classification
- Kingdom: Animalia
- Phylum: Arthropoda
- Class: Insecta
- Order: Lepidoptera
- Family: Tineidae
- Genus: Opogona
- Species: O. autogama

Binomial name
- Opogona autogama (Meyrick, 1911)

Synonyms
- Hieroxestis autogama Meyrick, 1911

Species of moth

Opogona autogama is a moth of the family Tineidae.

== Distribution ==
It is found in the Seychelles and Mauritius.

This species has a wingspan of 12–13 mm, head is purplish-fuscous, tuft brownish-ochreous, fillet and face shining greyish-ochreous. Forewings lanceolate, bronzy-grey or light purplish-fuscous,

In male: a long light grey subcostal hairpencil from base lying beneath forewings this character is quite distinctive.
