= Opogona antistacta =

Scientific classification
- Kingdom: Animalia
- Phylum: Arthropoda
- Class: Insecta
- Order: Lepidoptera
- Family: Tineidae
- Genus: Opogona
- Species: O. antistacta

Binomial name
- Opogona antistacta Meyrick, 1937

Species of moth

Opogona antistacta is a moth of the family Tineidae described from a specimen intercepted in the United Kingdom on banana imports.

It has a length of the forewings of 4-6.2 mm and some additional specimens were discovered in shipments originating from Colombia and Cuba, as well as another specimen that was reared from sugar cane. It is light brown dorsally.
