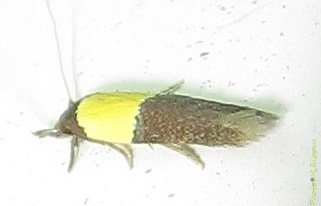

Scientific classification
- Kingdom: Animalia
- Phylum: Arthropoda
- Clade: Pancrustacea
- Class: Insecta
- Order: Lepidoptera
- Family: Tineidae
- Genus: Opogona
- Species: O. dimidiatella

Binomial name
- Opogona dimidiatella (Zeller, 1853)

Synonyms
- Glyphipteryx dimidiatella Walker 1864; Lozostoma semisulphurea Stainton 1859

= Opogona dimidiatella =

Species of moth

Opogona dimidiatella is a moth of the family Tineidae. It is found in southern South Africa, Kenya, Uganda, Réunion, India, Indonesia (Java), Sri Lanka and the Philippines.

They are known to attack sugarcane in the fields but also feeds on pods of Caesalpinia pulcherrima (L.) Sw. and dry vegetable refuse

It's the type species of the genus Opogona.
