= Ochromolopis xeropa =

Scientific classification
- Kingdom: Animalia
- Phylum: Arthropoda
- Class: Insecta
- Order: Lepidoptera
- Family: Epermeniidae
- Genus: Ochromolopis
- Species: O. xeropa

Binomial name
- Ochromolopis xeropa (Meyrick, 1911)

Synonyms
- Temelucha xeropa Meyrick, 1909; Epermenia praefumata Meyrick, 1911; Temeluchella xeropa Meyrick, 1909

Species of moth

Ochromolopis xeropa is a moth in the family Epermeniidae. It was described by Edward Meyrick in 1911. It is found in South Africa.
