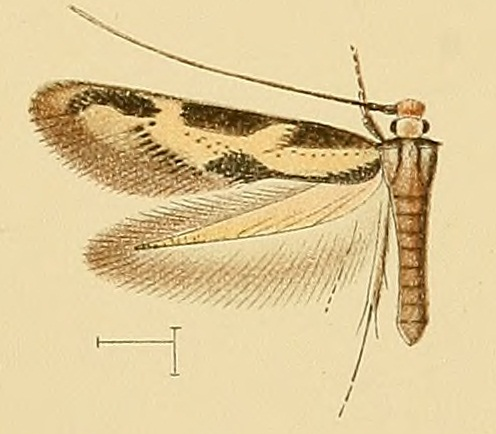

Scientific classification
- Kingdom: Animalia
- Phylum: Arthropoda
- Class: Insecta
- Order: Lepidoptera
- Family: Tineidae
- Genus: Oinophila
- Species: O. nesiotes

Binomial name
- Oinophila nesiotes Walsingham, 1908

= Oinophila nesiotes =

Species of moth

Oinophila nesiotes is a moth of the family Tineidae. It is found on the Canary Islands.

The wingspan is 8–9 mm. The forewings are dark olivaceous brown with two shining pale ochreous transverse fasciae. The hindwings are bronzy brownish with a few iridescent metallic scales.

The larvae possibly feed on dead leaves.
