= Ochromolopis kaszabi =

Scientific classification
- Kingdom: Animalia
- Phylum: Arthropoda
- Clade: Pancrustacea
- Class: Insecta
- Order: Lepidoptera
- Family: Epermeniidae
- Genus: Ochromolopis
- Species: O. kaszabi

Binomial name
- Ochromolopis kaszabi Gaedike, 1973

Species of moth

Ochromolopis kaszabi is a moth of the family Epermeniidae. It is found in Mongolia, the Russian Far East, southern Siberia and China.

== Subspecies ==
- Ochromolopis kaszabi kaszabi
- Ochromolopis kaszabi minima Budashkin & Satshkov, 1991 (southern Primorje)
