= Mitrogona =

Scientific classification
- Kingdom: Animalia
- Phylum: Arthropoda
- Clade: Pancrustacea
- Class: Insecta
- Order: Lepidoptera
- Family: Tineidae
- Subfamily: Hieroxestinae
- Genus: Mitrogona; Meyrick, 1920

Genus of moths

Mitrogona is a genus of moths belonging to the family Tineidae.

== Species ==
- Mitrogona laevis Meyrick, 1920 (from Kenya)
