= Ochromolopis zagulajevi =

Scientific classification
- Domain: Eukaryota
- Kingdom: Animalia
- Phylum: Arthropoda
- Class: Insecta
- Order: Lepidoptera
- Family: Epermeniidae
- Genus: Ochromolopis
- Species: O. zagulajevi

Binomial name
- Ochromolopis zagulajevi Budashkin & Satshkov, 1991

Species of moth

Ochromolopis zagulajevi is a moth of the family Epermeniidae. It is found in the central part of Povolzh’je, northern Ukraine, the Crimea, the Caucasus Mountains, Transcaucasia and western Kazakhstan.
