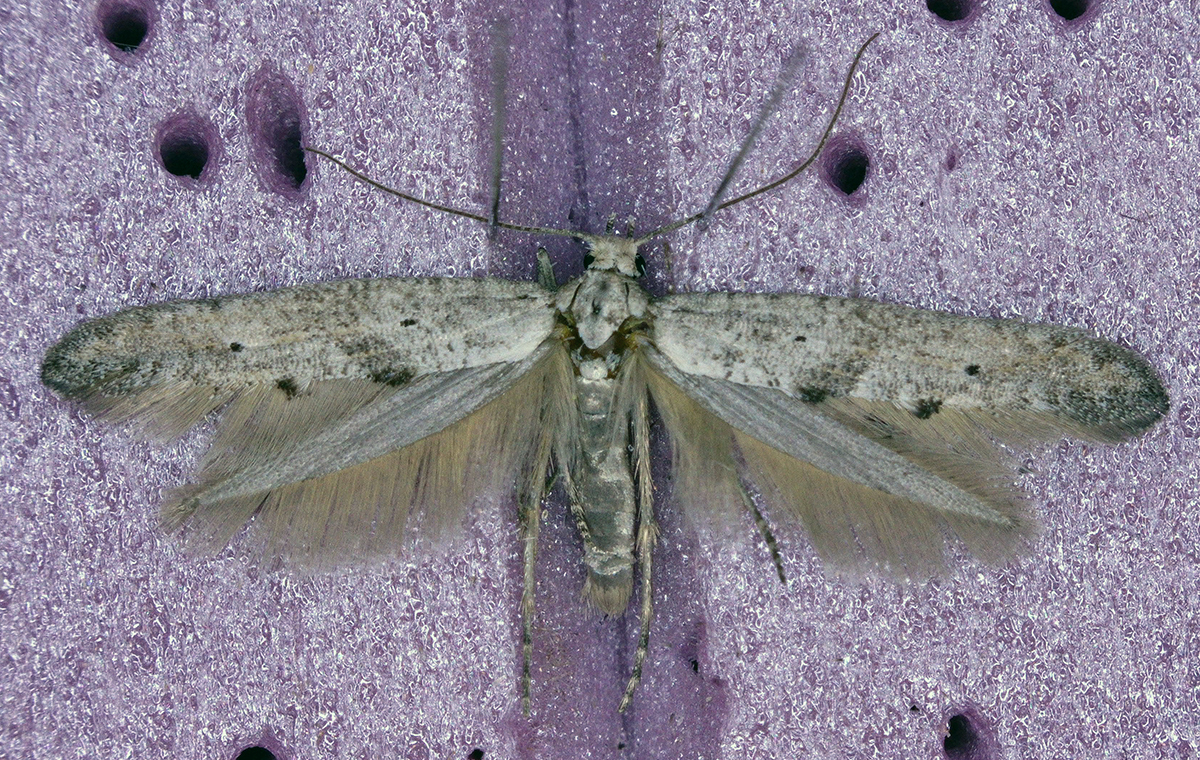

Scientific classification
- Kingdom: Animalia
- Phylum: Arthropoda
- Clade: Pancrustacea
- Class: Insecta
- Order: Lepidoptera
- Family: Epermeniidae
- Genus: Ochromolopis
- Species: O. ramapoella

Binomial name
- Ochromolopis ramapoella (Kearfott, 1903)

Synonyms
- Epimenia ramapoella Kearfott, 1903; Epermenia ramapoella Kearfott, 1903; Epermenia bidentata Braun, 1926; Epermenia metrothetis Meyrick, 1921

= Ochromolopis ramapoella =

Species of moth

Ochromolopis ramapoella is a species of moth in the family Epermeniidae. It was first described by William D. Kearfott in 1903. It is found in North America, where it has been recorded from Alberta, Illinois, Indiana, Kentucky, Manitoba, Michigan, New York, Ohio and Quebec.

The wingspan is about 15 mm. The forewings are light gray irrorated (speckled) with white and slightly sprinkled with dark fuscous. There are some slight dots of blackish irroration along the costa and black dots in the disc at one-third, two-thirds and three-fourths, the last larger. The apical fourth has clouded purplish-gray suffusion and scattered dark fuscous scales. The hindwings are gray. Adults are on wing from May to July.

The larvae feed on the fruit of Comandra umbellata.
