= Ochromolopis cana =

Scientific classification
- Kingdom: Animalia
- Phylum: Arthropoda
- Clade: Pancrustacea
- Class: Insecta
- Order: Lepidoptera
- Family: Epermeniidae
- Genus: Ochromolopis
- Species: O. cana

Binomial name
- Ochromolopis cana Gaedike, 2013

Species of moth

Ochromolopis cana is a moth in the family Epermeniidae. It was described by Reinhard Gaedike in 2013. It is found in South Africa, where it has been recorded from the Western Cape.
