= Ochromolopis sagittella =

Scientific classification
- Kingdom: Animalia
- Phylum: Arthropoda
- Clade: Pancrustacea
- Class: Insecta
- Order: Lepidoptera
- Family: Epermeniidae
- Genus: Ochromolopis
- Species: O. sagittella

Binomial name
- Ochromolopis sagittella Gaedike, 2013

Species of moth

Ochromolopis sagittella is a moth in the family Epermeniidae. It was described by Reinhard Gaedike in 2013. It is found in Kenya.
