= Ippa taxiarcha =

Scientific classification
- Kingdom: Animalia
- Phylum: Arthropoda
- Class: Insecta
- Order: Lepidoptera
- Family: Tineidae
- Genus: Ippa
- Species: I. taxiarcha

Binomial name
- Ippa taxiarcha (Meyrick, 1916)

Synonyms
- Pachypsaltis taxiarcha Meyrick, 1916

Species of moth

Ippa taxiarcha is a moth of the family Tineidae first described by Edward Meyrick in 1916. It is found in Sri Lanka.
