= Opogona bicolorella =

Scientific classification
- Domain: Eukaryota
- Kingdom: Animalia
- Phylum: Arthropoda
- Class: Insecta
- Order: Lepidoptera
- Family: Tineidae
- Genus: Opogona
- Species: O. bicolorella

Binomial name
- Opogona bicolorella (Matsumura, 1931)

Synonyms
- Chrysoclista bicolorella Matsumura, 1931

Species of moth

Opogona bicolorella is a moth of the family Tineidae. It was described by Shōnen Matsumura in 1931. It is found in Japan and Taiwan.
