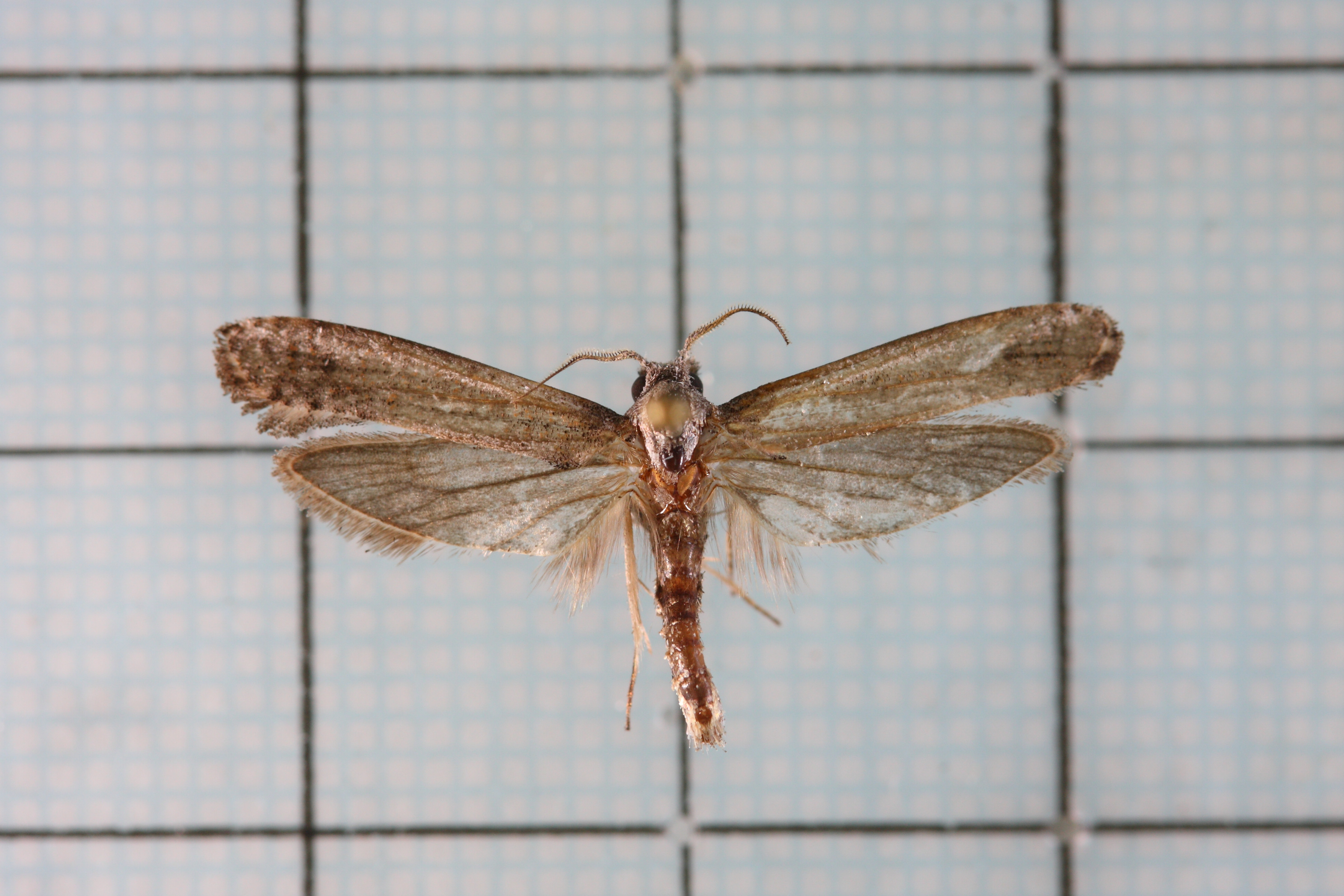
- Unidentified Harmaclona

Scientific classification
- Kingdom: Animalia
- Phylum: Arthropoda
- Clade: Pancrustacea
- Class: Insecta
- Order: Lepidoptera
- Family: Tineidae
- Subfamily: Harmacloninae
- Genus: Harmaclona; Busck, 1914

Type species
- Harmaclona cossidella Busck, 1914

Synonyms
- Lophosetia T. B. Fletcher, 1939; Micrerethista Meyrick, 1938; Ptychoxena Meyrick, 1916; Syncopacma Meyrick, 1938 (unavailable name)

= Harmaclona =

Genus of moths

Harmaclona are a genus of moths, belonging to the family Tineidae. The genus was described by August Busck in 1914.

== Species ==
- Harmaclona afrotephrantha Davis, 1998
- Harmaclona berberea Bradley, 1956
- Harmaclona cossidella Busck, 1914
- Harmaclona hexacantha Davis, 1998
- Harmaclona hilethera Bradley, 1953
- Harmaclona malgassica Bradley, 1956
- Harmaclona natalensis Bradley, 1953
- Harmaclona robinsoni Davis, 1998
- Harmaclona tephrantha (Meyrick, 1916)
- Harmaclona triacantha Davis, 1998
