= Ippa recitatella =

Scientific classification
- Kingdom: Animalia
- Phylum: Arthropoda
- Class: Insecta
- Order: Lepidoptera
- Family: Tineidae
- Genus: Ippa
- Species: I. recitatella

Binomial name
- Ippa recitatella (Walker, 1864)

Synonyms
- Gaphara recitatella Walker, 1864

Species of moth

Ippa recitatella is a moth of the family Tineidae first described by Francis Walker in 1864. It is found in Sri Lanka.
