= Opogona doxophanes =

Scientific classification
- Kingdom: Animalia
- Phylum: Arthropoda
- Class: Insecta
- Order: Lepidoptera
- Family: Tineidae
- Genus: Opogona
- Species: O. doxophanes

Binomial name
- Opogona doxophanes Meyrick, 1915

Species of moth

Opogona doxophanes is a moth of the family Tineidae first described by Edward Meyrick in 1915. It is found in Sri Lanka.
