= Opogona rhynchacma =

Scientific classification
- Kingdom: Animalia
- Phylum: Arthropoda
- Class: Insecta
- Order: Lepidoptera
- Family: Tineidae
- Genus: Opogona
- Species: O. rhynchacma

Binomial name
- Opogona rhynchacma Meyrick, 1920

Species of moth

Opogona rhynchacma is a moth of the family Tineidae from Brazil.
