= Archemitra =

Scientific classification
- Kingdom: Animalia
- Phylum: Arthropoda
- Clade: Pancrustacea
- Class: Insecta
- Order: Lepidoptera
- Family: Tineidae
- Subfamily: Hieroxestinae
- Genus: Archemitra; Meyrick, 1920

Type species
- Archemitra iorrhoa Meyrick, 1920

Genus of moths

Archemitra is a genus of moths belonging to the family Tineidae.
