= Ippa polyscia =

Scientific classification
- Kingdom: Animalia
- Phylum: Arthropoda
- Class: Insecta
- Order: Lepidoptera
- Family: Tineidae
- Genus: Ippa
- Species: I. polyscia

Binomial name
- Ippa polyscia (Meyrick, 1917)

Synonyms
- Hypophrictis polyscia Meyrick, 1917

Species of moth

Ippa polyscia is a moth of the family Tineidae first described by Edward Meyrick in 1917. It is found in Sri Lanka.
