= Trichophaga scandinaviella =

Scientific classification
- Kingdom: Animalia
- Phylum: Arthropoda
- Class: Insecta
- Order: Lepidoptera
- Family: Tineidae
- Genus: Trichophaga
- Species: T. scandinaviella

Binomial name
- Trichophaga scandinaviella Zagulajev, 1960

Species of moth

Trichophaga scandinaviella is a moth belonging to the family Tineidae. The species was first described by Zagulajev in 1960.

It is native to Northern Europe.
