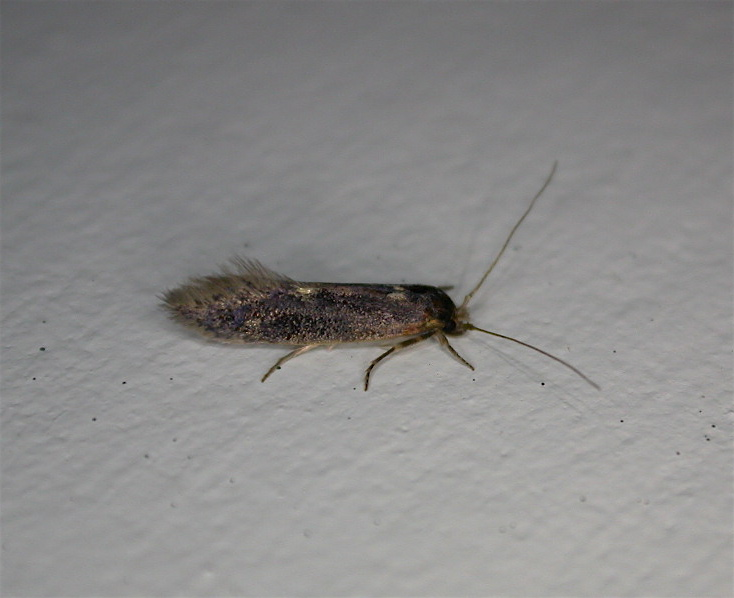

Scientific classification
- Kingdom: Animalia
- Phylum: Arthropoda
- Clade: Pancrustacea
- Class: Insecta
- Order: Lepidoptera
- Family: Tineidae
- Genus: Opogona
- Species: O. omoscopa

Binomial name
- Opogona omoscopa (Meyrick, 1893)

Synonyms
- Hieroxestis omoscopa Meyrick, 1893; Gracilaria strassenella Enderleinm, 1903; Hieroxestis praematura Meyrick, 1909; Opogona apicalis Swezey, 1909

= Opogona omoscopa =

Species of moth

Opogona omoscopa is a moth of the family Tineidae.

== Distribution ==
It is found in western Australia, New Zealand, south-east Asia, in Africa from Ethiopia to South Africa and several islands of the Indian Ocean. It is also one of the few species that had been recorded on the remote island of Île Amsterdam of the French Southern and Antarctic Territories. It is an introduced species in the United States, Europe and the United Kingdom.

== Biology ==
The wingspan is about 18-22 mm.

The larvae feed on various types of decaying vegetation including rotting wood, cork, compost, rhubarb, gladioli corms and pineapple roots. Host-plants include: Persea sp. (Lauraceae), Limonium sp. (Plumbaginaceae), Cyclamen sp. (Myrsinaceae), Thuja sp. (Cupressaceae), Fuchsia sp. (Onagraceae), Saccharum sp. (Poaceae) and Quercus suber (Fagaceae).
