= Kermania =

Scientific classification
- Kingdom: Animalia
- Phylum: Arthropoda
- Clade: Pancrustacea
- Class: Insecta
- Order: Lepidoptera
- Family: Tineidae
- Subfamily: Hieroxestinae
- Genus: Kermania; Amsel, 1964

Genus of moths

Kermania is a genus of moths belonging to the family Tineidae.

== Species ==
- Kermania pistaciella Amsel, 1964 (from Iran and Turkey)
