= Phaeoses argoceros =

Scientific classification
- Kingdom: Animalia
- Phylum: Arthropoda
- Class: Insecta
- Order: Lepidoptera
- Family: Tineidae
- Genus: Phaeoses
- Species: P. argoceros

Binomial name
- Phaeoses argoceros (Meyrick, 1937)

Synonyms
- Calamograptis argoceros Meyrick, 1937

Species of moth

Phaeoses argoceros is a moth in the family Tineidae. It was described by Edward Meyrick in 1937. It is found in Singapore.
