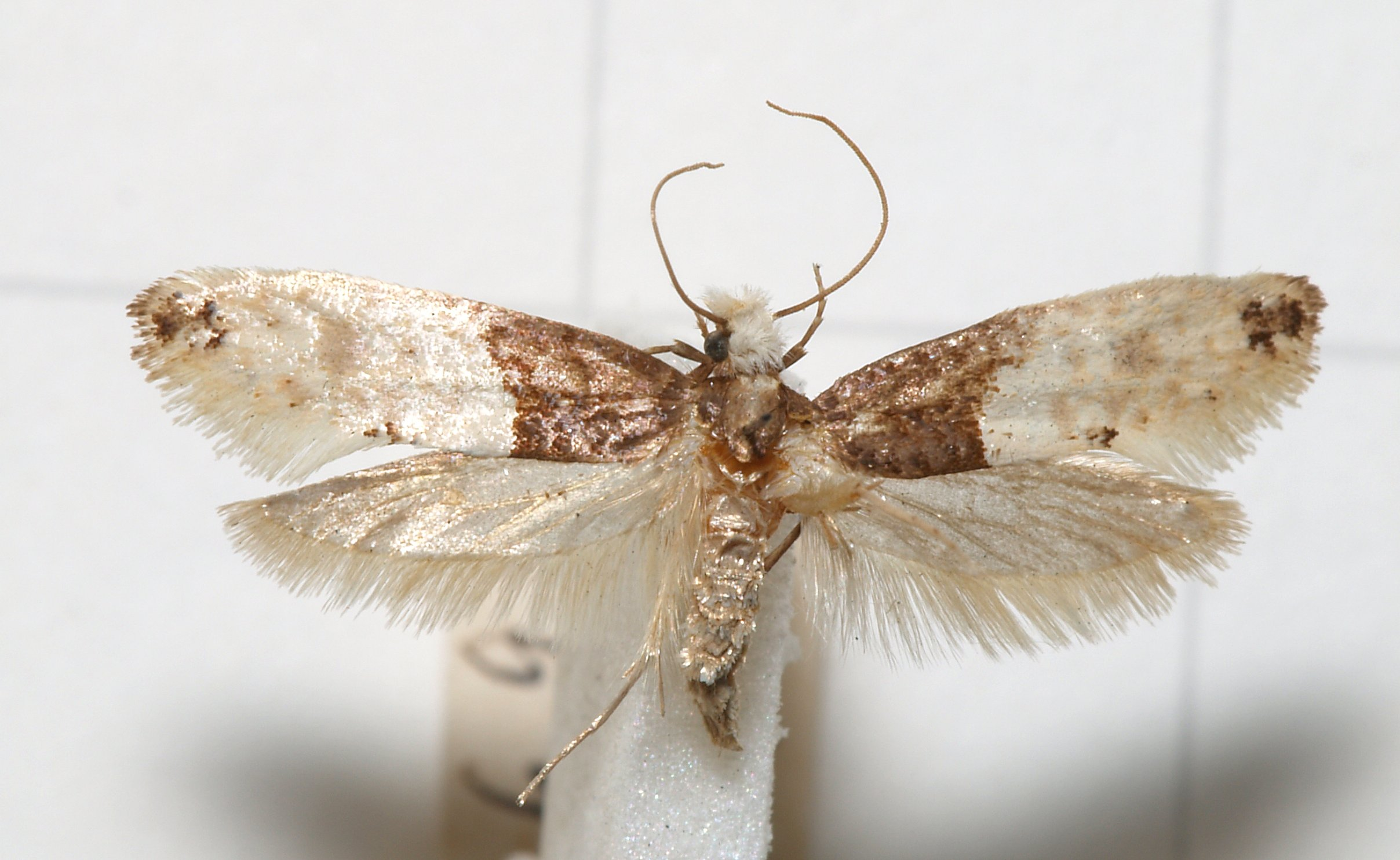
- Adult tapestry moth (T. tapetzella) specimen

Scientific classification
- Kingdom: Animalia
- Phylum: Arthropoda
- Clade: Pancrustacea
- Class: Insecta
- Order: Lepidoptera
- Family: Tineidae
- Subfamily: Tineinae
- Genus: Trichophaga; Ragonot, 1894

= Trichophaga =

Genus of moths

Trichophaga is a genus of the fungus moth family, Tineidae. Therein, it belongs to the moninate subfamily Tineinae.

== Species ==
Species of Trichophaga are:

- Trichophaga abruptella (Wollaston T. V., 1858)
- Trichophaga atripunctella Gaedike, 2014
- Trichophaga bipartitella (Ragonot 1892) (=Trichophaga amina Meyrick, 1925, Trichophaga desertella Mabille, 1907)
- Trichophaga cuspidata Gozmány, 1967
- Trichophaga mormopis Meyrick, 1935
- Trichophaga robinsoni Gaedike & Karsholt 2001 (=Tinea abruptella Wollaston, 1858)
- Trichophaga scandinaviella Zagulajev 1960 (=Trichophaga rjabovi Zagulajev, 1960)
- Trichophaga swinhoei (Butler, 1884) (=Trichophaga coprobiella Ragonot, 1894)
- Trichophaga tapetzella – tapestry moth, carpet moth
- Trichophaga ziniella Zagulajev, 1960

== Footnotes ==
afromoths.net
