= Asymplecta =

Scientific classification
- Kingdom: Animalia
- Phylum: Arthropoda
- Clade: Pancrustacea
- Class: Insecta
- Order: Lepidoptera
- Family: Tineidae
- Subfamily: Hieroxestinae
- Genus: Asymplecta; Meyrick, 1921

Species
- Asymplecta aplectodes (Turner, 1923); Asymplecta circumflua Meyrick, 1921; Asymplecta phorbiophora Diakonoff, 1955

Genus of moths

Asymplecta is a genus of moths belonging to the family Tineidae.
