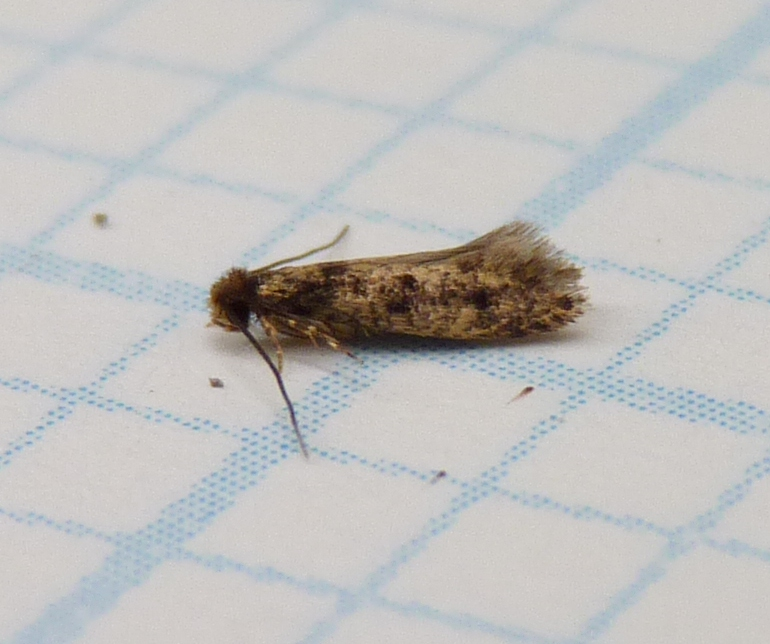
- Phereoeca uterella

Scientific classification
- Kingdom: Animalia
- Phylum: Arthropoda
- Class: Insecta
- Order: Lepidoptera
- Family: Tineidae
- Genus: Phereoeca; Hinton & Bradley, 1956

Species include
- P. allutella P. barysticta P. fallax P. lodli P. oblitescens P. pachyspila P. praecox P. spharagistis P. uterella P. verna

= Phereoeca =

Genus of moths

Phereoeca is a genus of moths belonging to the family Tineidae. The larvae of these moths build protective silk cases and some are moderate household pests.
