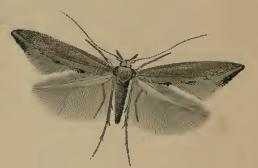

Scientific classification
- Domain: Eukaryota
- Kingdom: Animalia
- Phylum: Arthropoda
- Class: Insecta
- Order: Lepidoptera
- Family: Epermeniidae
- Genus: Ochromolopis
- Species: O. staintonellus

Binomial name
- Ochromolopis staintonellus (Millière, 1869)

Synonyms
- Chauliodus staintonellus Millière, 1869

= Ochromolopis staintonellus =

Species of moth

Ochromolopis staintonellus is a moth of the family Epermeniidae. It is found in southern Europe.

The larvae feed on Osyris alba.

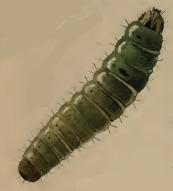
Larva

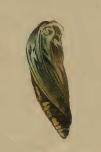
Pupa

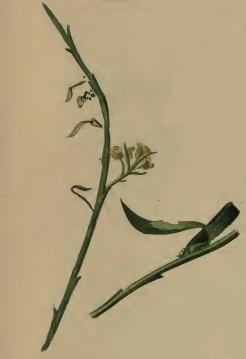
Sprigs of Osyris alba attacked by larva
