= Opogona stathmota =

Scientific classification
- Kingdom: Animalia
- Phylum: Arthropoda
- Class: Insecta
- Order: Lepidoptera
- Family: Tineidae
- Genus: Opogona
- Species: O. stathmota

Binomial name
- Opogona stathmota Meyrick, 1911

Species of moth

Opogona stathmota is a moth of the family Tineidae first described by Edward Meyrick in 1911. It is found in Sri Lanka.
