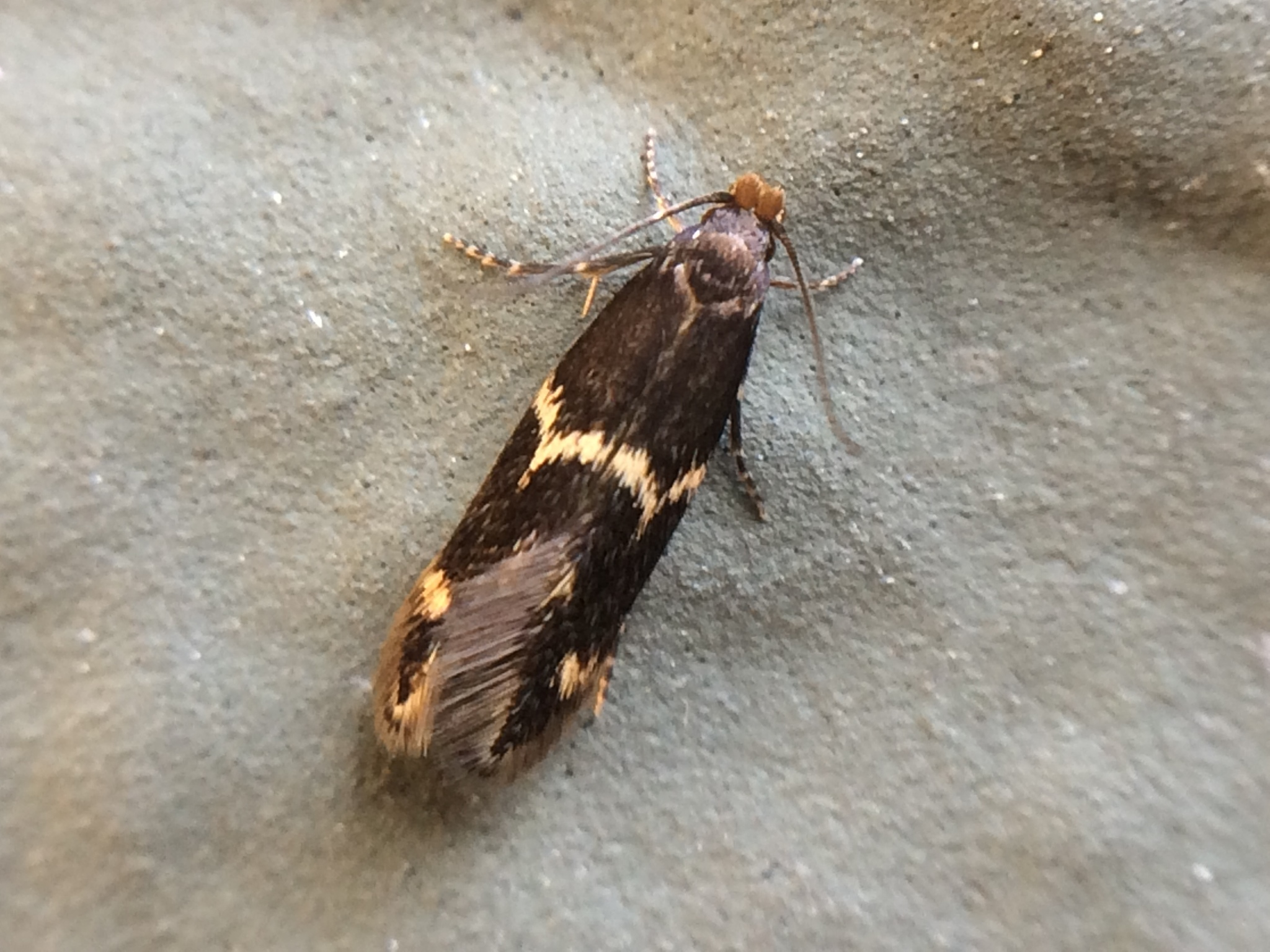

Scientific classification
- Kingdom: Animalia
- Phylum: Arthropoda
- Class: Insecta
- Order: Lepidoptera
- Family: Tineidae
- Genus: Oinophila
- Species: O. v-flava

Binomial name
- Oinophila v-flava (Haworth, 1828)

Synonyms
- Gracillaria v-flava Haworth, 1828; Elachista flavofasciella Duponchel, 1844; Oinophila v-flavum

= Oinophila v-flava =

Yellow v moth

Species of moth

Oinophila v-flava (yellow v moth) is a moth of the family Tineidae. It is widespread in temperate zones from Europe to South Africa, North America but also Hawaii. This species has also been recorded in New Zealand in 2001 and is regarded as having established itself in that country.

The wingspan is about 10 mm. In western Europe, adults are active from July to September and generally fly in the evening.

The larvae feed on a range of dry vegetable matter and on the bark of shrubs. It often occurs commonly in homes and particularly cellars, where the larvae have been reported to damage dried foods and wine corks.
