= Ochromolopis incrassa =

Scientific classification
- Domain: Eukaryota
- Kingdom: Animalia
- Phylum: Arthropoda
- Class: Insecta
- Order: Lepidoptera
- Family: Epermeniidae
- Genus: Ochromolopis
- Species: O. incrassa

Binomial name
- Ochromolopis incrassa Clarke, 1971

Species of moth

Ochromolopis incrassa is a moth in the family Epermeniidae. It was described by Clarke in 1971. It is found on the Austral Islands of French Polynesia.
