= Phaeoses =

Scientific classification
- Kingdom: Animalia
- Phylum: Arthropoda
- Clade: Pancrustacea
- Class: Insecta
- Order: Lepidoptera
- Family: Tineidae
- Subfamily: Hieroxestinae
- Genus: Phaeoses; Forbes, 1922

Synonyms
- Calamograptis Meyrick, 1937

Genus of moths

Phaeoses is a genus of moths belonging to the family Tineidae.

== Species ==
- Phaeoses amblyxena (Meyrick, 1920)
- Phaeoses argoceros (Meyrick, 1937) (from Singapore)
- Phaeoses caenologa (Meyrick, 1915)
- Phaeoses chalinota (Meyrick, 1910) (from India/Sri Lanka)
- Phaeoses chloracma (Meyrick, 1907)
- Phaeoses flabilis (Turner, 1923)
- Phaeoses guppyi (Bradley, 1961)
- Phaeoses horolyca (Meyrick, 1915)
- Phaeoses leucodeta (Meyrick, 1914)
- Phaeoses leucoprosopa (Turner, 1923)
- Phaeoses lithacma (Meyrick, 1921) (from Zimbabwe)
- Phaeoses meeki (Bradley, 1961)
- Phaeoses pileigera (Meyrick, 1913) (from South Africa)
- Phaeoses sabinella Forbes, 1922
