= Opogona amphicausta =

Scientific classification
- Kingdom: Animalia
- Phylum: Arthropoda
- Clade: Pancrustacea
- Class: Insecta
- Order: Lepidoptera
- Family: Tineidae
- Genus: Opogona
- Species: O. amphicausta

Binomial name
- Opogona amphicausta Meyrick, 1907

Species of moth

Opogona amphicausta is a moth of the family Tineidae first described by Edward Meyrick in 1907. It is found in Sri Lanka.

It's forewings are brassy-yellow, base and apex rather narowly dark purplish-fuscous; a small bronzy-fuscous dorsals port before tornus.
