= Ochromolopis pallida =

Scientific classification
- Kingdom: Animalia
- Phylum: Arthropoda
- Clade: Pancrustacea
- Class: Insecta
- Order: Lepidoptera
- Family: Epermeniidae
- Genus: Ochromolopis
- Species: O. pallida

Binomial name
- Ochromolopis pallida Gaedike, 2004

Species of moth

Ochromolopis pallida is a moth in the family Epermeniidae. It was described by Reinhard Gaedike in 2004. It is found on Madagascar.
