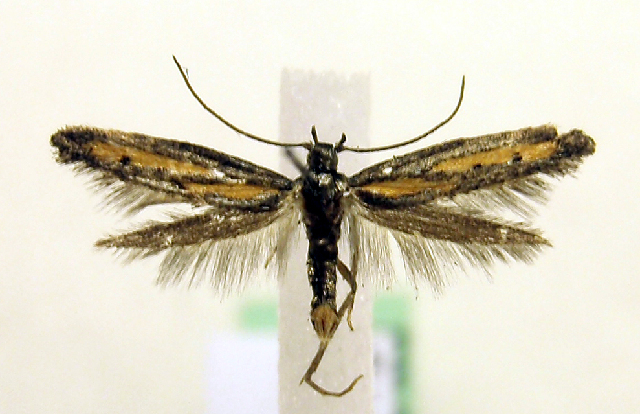

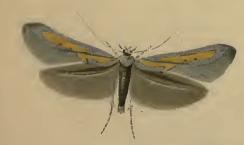

Scientific classification
- Kingdom: Animalia
- Phylum: Arthropoda
- Clade: Pancrustacea
- Class: Insecta
- Order: Lepidoptera
- Family: Epermeniidae
- Genus: Ochromolopis
- Species: O. ictella

Binomial name
- Ochromolopis ictella (Hübner, 1813)

Synonyms
- Tinea ictella Hübner, 1813; Epermenia ictella; Ornix ictipennella Treitschke, 1833

= Ochromolopis ictella =

Species of moth

Ochromolopis ictella is a moth of the family Epermeniidae. It is found from Finland to the Iberian Peninsula, Italy and Greece and from France to Ukraine. It is also found in North Africa.

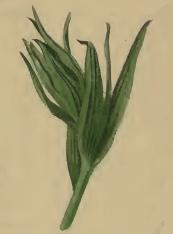
A shoot of Thesium montanum drawn together by larva

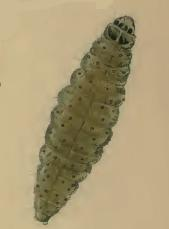
Larva

The wingspan is 11–13 mm.

The larvae feed on Thesium species, including Thesium bavarum. They initially mine the leaves of their host plant. Larvae are greenish with a pale brown head.
