= Ochromolopis ithycentra =

Scientific classification
- Kingdom: Animalia
- Phylum: Arthropoda
- Class: Insecta
- Order: Lepidoptera
- Family: Epermeniidae
- Genus: Ochromolopis
- Species: O. ithycentra

Binomial name
- Ochromolopis ithycentra (Meyrick, 1926)

Synonyms
- Epermenia ithycentra Meyrick, 1926

Species of moth

Ochromolopis ithycentra is a moth in the family Epermeniidae. It was described by Edward Meyrick in 1926. It is found in South Africa.
