= Ippa inceptrix =

Scientific classification
- Kingdom: Animalia
- Phylum: Arthropoda
- Class: Insecta
- Order: Lepidoptera
- Family: Tineidae
- Genus: Ippa
- Species: I. inceptrix

Binomial name
- Ippa inceptrix (Meyrick, 1916)

Synonyms
- Hypophrictis inceptrix Meyrick, 1916

Species of moth

Ippa inceptrix is a moth of the family Tineidae first described by Edward Meyrick in 1916. It is found in Sri Lanka and probably India.
