= Opogona flavofasciata =

Scientific classification
- Kingdom: Animalia
- Phylum: Arthropoda
- Clade: Pancrustacea
- Class: Insecta
- Order: Lepidoptera
- Family: Tineidae
- Genus: Opogona
- Species: O. flavofasciata

Binomial name
- Opogona flavofasciata (Stainton, 1859)

Synonyms
- Lozostoma flavofasciata Stainton, 1859; Cachura objectella Walker, 1864

Species of moth

Opogona flavofasciata is a moth of the family Tineidae. It is found in the India (Calcutta), Sri Lanka and the Philippines.

The forewings are dark purple, more greyish at the base, with a broad dark yellow fascia nearly in the middle, very nearly straight, but rather nearer the base on the inner margin than on the costa. The hindwings are coppery-brown, but paler at the base.
