= Trichophaga mormopis =

Scientific classification
- Kingdom: Animalia
- Phylum: Arthropoda
- Class: Insecta
- Order: Lepidoptera
- Family: Tineidae
- Genus: Trichophaga
- Species: T. mormopis

Binomial name
- Trichophaga mormopis Meyrick, 1935

Synonyms
- Trichophaga percna Corbet & Tams, 1943

Species of moth

Trichophaga mormopis is a moth of the family Tineidae. It was first described by Edward Meyrick in 1935. It is widely distributed from Africa to India, Sri Lanka, Malaya, Taiwan and Fiji. It was first recorded from Hawaii in 1944.

The wingspan is 6–8 mm.

The larvae feed on a variety of dead materials, including fur, skin, woolen materials and feathers.
