= Opogona percnodes =

Scientific classification
- Kingdom: Animalia
- Phylum: Arthropoda
- Class: Insecta
- Order: Lepidoptera
- Family: Tineidae
- Genus: Opogona
- Species: O. percnodes

Binomial name
- Opogona percnodes Meyrick, 1910

Species of moth

Opogona percnodes is a moth of the family Tineidae. It is found in India and Sri Lanka.

The wingspan is 12–15 mm. The forewings are dark fuscous, with purplish-bronzy reflections. The hindwings are dark fuscous, faintly purplish-tinged.
