= Cimitra seclusella =

Scientific classification
- Kingdom: Animalia
- Phylum: Arthropoda
- Class: Insecta
- Order: Lepidoptera
- Family: Tineidae
- Genus: Cimitra
- Species: C. seclusella

Binomial name
- Cimitra seclusella Walker, 1864

Synonyms
- Hapsifera affabilis Meyrick, 1931; Hapsifera contexta Meyrick, 1916; Scalidomia hoenei Petersen, 1991; Tinea inconcisella Walker, 1864; Tinea spernatella Walker, 1864

Species of moth

Cimitra seclusella is a moth of the family Tineidae first described by Francis Walker in 1864. It is found in India, Sri Lanka, Taiwan, Myanmar, Vietnam, Malaysia and Java.

Adult wingspan is 21 mm. Head, thorax and abdomen grayish brown. Semi erect scales found on the top of the head and on the face. Forewings rough scaled with four-five erect scaled ill-defined tufts. Frenulum single short and a stumpy bristle.
