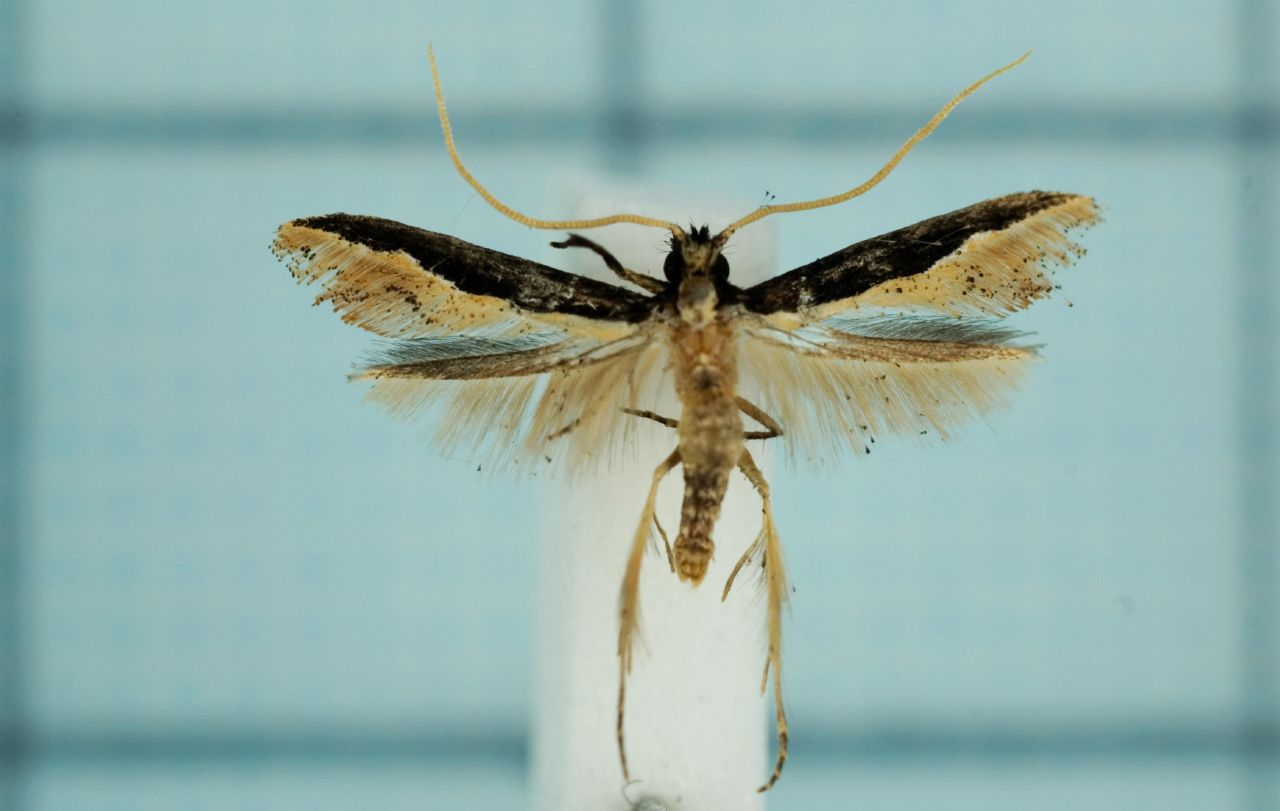

Scientific classification
- Kingdom: Animalia
- Phylum: Arthropoda
- Clade: Pancrustacea
- Class: Insecta
- Order: Lepidoptera
- Family: Tineidae
- Subfamily: Myrmecozelinae
- Genus: Pyloetis; Meyrick, 1907
- Species: P. mimosae

Binomial name
- Pyloetis mimosae (Stainton, 1859)

Synonyms
- Genus: Spatularia W. van Deventer, 1904; Species: Laverna mimosae Stainton, 1859; Pyloetis ophionota Meyrick, 1907; Ereunetis seminivora Walsingham, 1899; Spatularia fuligineella Deventer, 1904

= Pyloetis =

Genus of moths

Pyloetis is a moth genus, belonging to the family Tineidae. It consists of only one species, Pyloetis mimosae, which is found in Asia, including Japan and Taiwan.

The wingspan is about 15 mm.

The larvae feed within seed pods of Leucaena leucocephala and Acacia nilotica.
