= Cervaria =

Scientific classification
- Kingdom: Animalia
- Phylum: Arthropoda
- Clade: Pancrustacea
- Class: Insecta
- Order: Lepidoptera
- Family: Tineidae
- Genus: Cervaria; Walker, 1866
- Species: C. xylinella

Binomial name
- Cervaria xylinella Walker, 1866

Genus of moths

Cervaria is a monotypic moth genus belonging to the family Tineidae. It contains only one species, Cervaria xylinella, which is found in India. Both the genus and species were described by Francis Walker in 1866.
