= Opogona fumiceps =

Scientific classification
- Kingdom: Animalia
- Phylum: Arthropoda
- Class: Insecta
- Order: Lepidoptera
- Family: Tineidae
- Genus: Opogona
- Species: O. fumiceps

Binomial name
- Opogona fumiceps Felder, 1875

Species of moth

Opogona fumiceps is a moth of the family Tineidae first described by Felder in 1875. It is found in Sri Lanka and India.
