= Wegneria lachanitis =

Scientific classification
- Kingdom: Animalia
- Phylum: Arthropoda
- Class: Insecta
- Order: Lepidoptera
- Family: Tineidae
- Genus: Wegneria
- Species: W. lachanitis

Binomial name
- Wegneria lachanitis (Meyrick, 1906)

Synonyms
- Opogona lachanitis Meyrick, 1906

Species of moth

Wegneria lachanitis is a moth of the family Tineidae first described by Edward Meyrick in 1906. It is found in Sri Lanka and India.

The caterpillars use fungi as their host plants.
