= Trichophaga robinsoni =

Scientific classification
- Kingdom: Animalia
- Phylum: Arthropoda
- Clade: Pancrustacea
- Class: Insecta
- Order: Lepidoptera
- Family: Tineidae
- Genus: Trichophaga
- Species: T. robinsoni

Binomial name
- Trichophaga robinsoni Gaedike & Karsholt, 2001

Synonyms
- Tinea abruptella Wollaston, 1858 (preocc. Tinea abruptella Thunberg, 1794); Trichophaga abruptella (Wollaston, 1858); ?Trichophaga desertella Mabille, 1907; ?Trichophaga amina Meyrick, 1925

Species of moth

Trichophaga robinsoni is a moth of the family Tineidae. It is found on the Canary Islands, the Selvagens Islands and Madeira. It has also been recorded from Asia minor, Saudi Arabia, Yemen, Tunisia, Egypt, Sudan, Somalia, the Central African Republic and the Democratic Republic of Congo. There is also a record for Fiji.

The larvae feed on decaying animal matter, including regurgitated pellets of Falco eleonorae.

== Taxonomy ==
The species was described as Tinea abruptella by Thomas Vernon Wollaston in 1858. This name is preoccupied and the new name Trichophaga robinsoni was proposed by Reinhard Gaedike and Ole Karsholt in 2001. Trichophaga amina and Trichophaga desertella are alternatively listed as synonyms of Trichophaga bipartitella.
