= Wegneria =

Scientific classification
- Kingdom: Animalia
- Phylum: Arthropoda
- Clade: Pancrustacea
- Class: Insecta
- Order: Lepidoptera
- Family: Tineidae
- Subfamily: Hieroxestinae
- Genus: Wegneria; Diakonoff, 1951

Type species
- *Wegneria cavernicola Diakonoff, 1951

Genus of moths

Wegneria is a genus of moths belonging to the family Tineidae.

== Species ==
Some species of this genus are:

- Wegneria acervalis (Meyrick, 1914) (from Malawi)
- Wegneria astragalodes (Meyrick, 1922) (from Uganda)
- Wegneria cavernicola Diakonoff, 1951
- Wegneria cerodelta (Meyrick, 1911) (from India, Japan, Malaysia, Korea, Taiwan, Thailand)
- Wegneria chrysophthalma (Meyrick, 1934) (from Uganda)
- Wegneria encharacta (Meyrick, 1915) (from India)
- Wegneria impotens (Meyrick, 1915) (from India)
- Wegneria lachanitis (Meyrick, 1906) (from India, Sri Lanka)
- Wegneria oxydesma (Meyrick, 1918) (from India)
- Wegneria plasturga (Meyrick, 1911) (from India)
- Wegneria panchalcella (Staudinger 1871) (from Algeria, Canaries, Greece, Hungary and Ukraine)
- Wegneria scaeozona (Meyrick, 1920) (from Kenya)
- Wegneria speciosa (Meyrick, 1914) (from Nigeria)
- Wegneria spherotoma (Meyrick, 1911) (from India)
- Wegneria subtilis (Diankonoff, 1955) (from New Guinea)
- Wegneria villiersi (Viette, 1955) (from Guinea)
