= Opogona isotalanta =

Scientific classification
- Kingdom: Animalia
- Phylum: Arthropoda
- Class: Insecta
- Order: Lepidoptera
- Family: Tineidae
- Genus: Opogona
- Species: O. isotalanta

Binomial name
- Opogona isotalanta Meyrick, 1930

Species of moth

Opogona isotalanta is a moth of the family Tineidae. It is found in Sri Lanka.
