= Trachytyla =

Scientific classification
- Kingdom: Animalia
- Phylum: Arthropoda
- Clade: Pancrustacea
- Class: Insecta
- Order: Lepidoptera
- Family: Tineidae
- Genus: Trachytyla; Meyrick, 1931
- Species: T. xylophthora

Binomial name
- Trachytyla xylophthora (Meyrick, 1922)

Synonyms
- Epicnaptis xylophthora Meyrick, 1922; Trachytyla rhizophaga Meyrick, 1931

Genus of moths

Trachytyla is a genus of moths belonging to the family Tineidae. It contains only one species, Trachytyla xylophthora, which is found in India.
