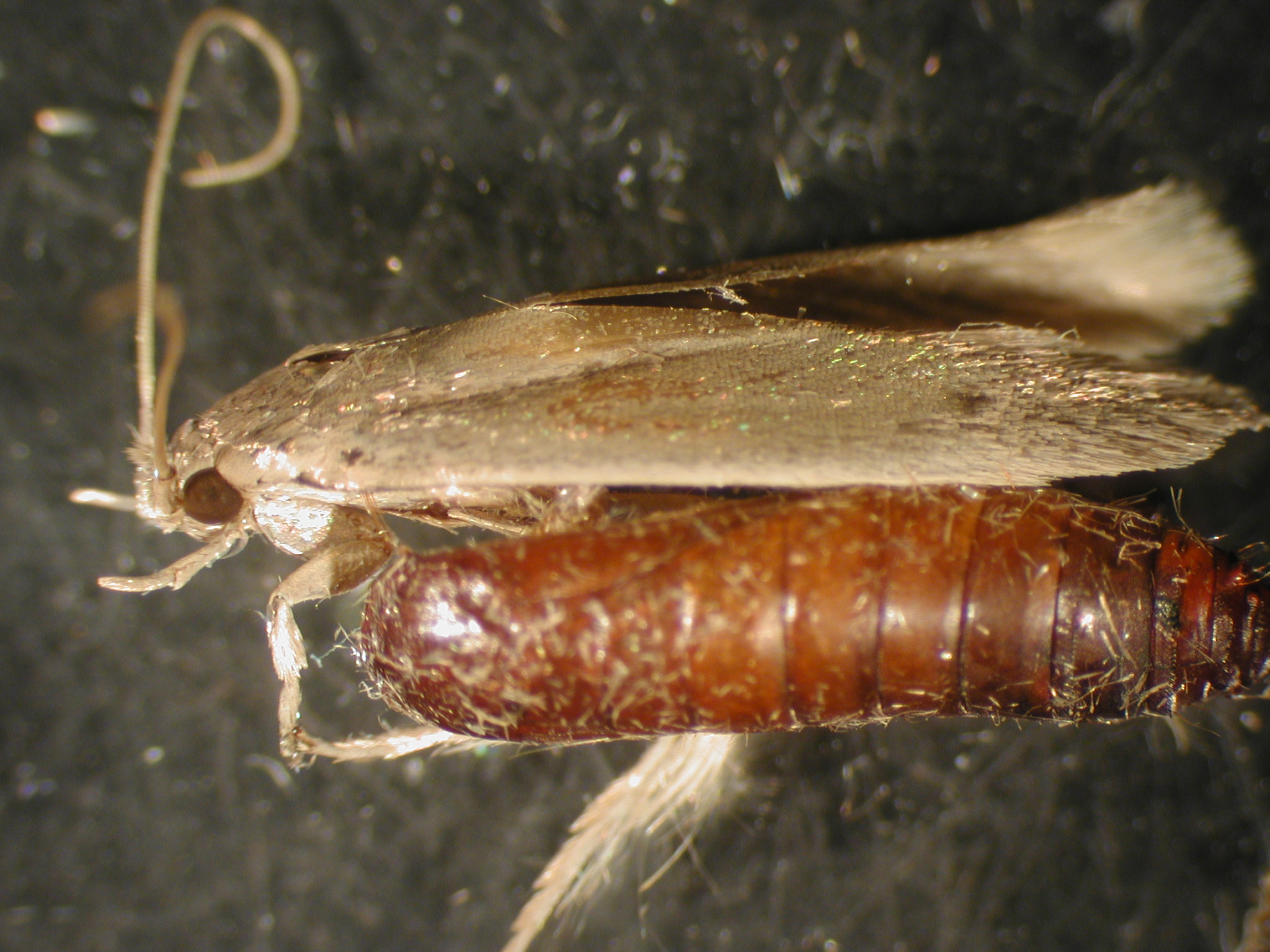
- Adult and larval case

Scientific classification
- Domain: Eukaryota
- Kingdom: Animalia
- Phylum: Arthropoda
- Class: Insecta
- Order: Lepidoptera
- Family: Tineidae
- Genus: Opogona
- Species: O. sacchari

Binomial name
- Opogona sacchari (Bojer, 1856)

Synonyms
- Alucita sacchari Bojer, 1856; Gelechia ligniferella Walker, 1875; Laverna plumipes Butler, 1876; Gelechia sanctaehelenae Walker, 1875; Tinea subcervinella Walker, 1863

= Opogona sacchari =

Species of moth

Opogona sacchari, the banana moth, is a moth of the family Tineidae. The species was first described by Wenceslas Bojer in 1856. It is native to the humid tropical and subtropical regions of sub-Saharan Africa, where it is also found in Madagascar, Mauritius, Réunion, Rodrigues Island, the Seychelles and St. Helena. It was first reported from the Canary Islands in the 1920s. In the 1970s, it was introduced into Brazil and Central America, and also appeared in Europe. It has been reported from Florida since 1986.

The wingspan is 18–25 mm. Adults are bright yellowish brown.

The larvae feed on a wide range of plants, including bananas, pineapples, bamboo, maize and sugarcane. In glasshouses in European countries, it has been found infesting various tropical or subtropical ornamentals, including Cactaceae, Dracaena, Strelitzia and Yucca, but also occasionally Alpinia, Begonia, Bougainvillea, Bromeliaceae, Chamaedorea and other palms, Cordyline, Dieffenbachia, Euphorbia pulcherrima, Ficus, Gloxinia, Heliconia, Hippeastrum, Maranta, Philodendron, Sansevieria, Streptocarpus sect. Saintpaulia, Capsicum and aubergines.

The pupae are shorter than 10 mm, brown and formed in a cocoon of 15 mm.

At 15 °C it has a life cycle of about three months: eggs hatch in 12 days, larval development 50 days, pupal stage 20 days and adult life 6 days.
