= Ochromolopis chelyodes =

Scientific classification
- Kingdom: Animalia
- Phylum: Arthropoda
- Class: Insecta
- Order: Lepidoptera
- Family: Epermeniidae
- Genus: Ochromolopis
- Species: O. chelyodes

Binomial name
- Ochromolopis chelyodes (Meyrick, 1910)

Synonyms
- Epermenia chelyodes Meyrick, 1910

Species of moth

Ochromolopis chelyodes is a moth in the family Epermeniidae. It was described by Edward Meyrick in 1910. It is found in India, where it has been recorded from Assam and the Himalayas.

The wingspan is 8–11 mm. The forewings are white, with scattered blackish scales and with two undefined oblique patches of pale ochreous suffusion from the dorsum near the base and before the middle, marked with black scales on the dorsum and with more or less irregular pale ochreous suffusion towards the middle of the disc, sometimes forming a defined patch beyond the middle. There is a small blackish spot on the middle of the costa and the apical third is variably more or less suffused with blackish irroration (sprinkles), including a roundish pale ochreous patch anteriorly. The hindwings are dark grey.
