= Harmaclona tephrantha =

Scientific classification
- Kingdom: Animalia
- Phylum: Arthropoda
- Class: Insecta
- Order: Lepidoptera
- Family: Tineidae
- Genus: Harmaclona
- Species: H. tephrantha

Binomial name
- Harmaclona tephrantha (Meyrick, 1916)

Synonyms
- Ptychoxena tephrantha Meyrick, 1916

Species of moth

Harmaclona tephrantha is a moth of the family Tineidae first described by Edward Meyrick in 1916.

== Distribution ==
It is found from India, Sri Lanka, to Bhutan, through Thailand and Indonesia as far as Brunei. It is also recently found from South China.

== Description ==
It is a gynandromorphic species with imperfect division. Like in most Lepidoptera, the female is larger than the male. The gynandromorph is almost equally divided into a male right side and a female left side. Its right forewing is 10 mm (0.39 in) and 2.0 mm (0.079 in) broad. A single large frenulum is present on the right side and two smaller frenula on the left side. Antennae are also dimorphic, where shortly bipectinate on the male side and filiform on the female side. Abdominal sclerites show dimorphism, where the female side has a large mat of fine hairs, whereas in the male side, it is unmodified and quadrate.

Host plants are Dipterocarpus turbinatus and Buchanania latifolia.
