= Peristactis =

Scientific classification
- Kingdom: Animalia
- Phylum: Arthropoda
- Clade: Pancrustacea
- Class: Insecta
- Order: Lepidoptera
- Family: Tineidae
- Genus: Peristactis; Meyrick, 1916
- Species: P. taraxias

Binomial name
- Peristactis taraxias Meyrick, 1916

Genus of moths

Peristactis is a genus of moths belonging to the family Tineidae. It contains only one species, Peristactis taraxias, which is found in Sri Lanka.
