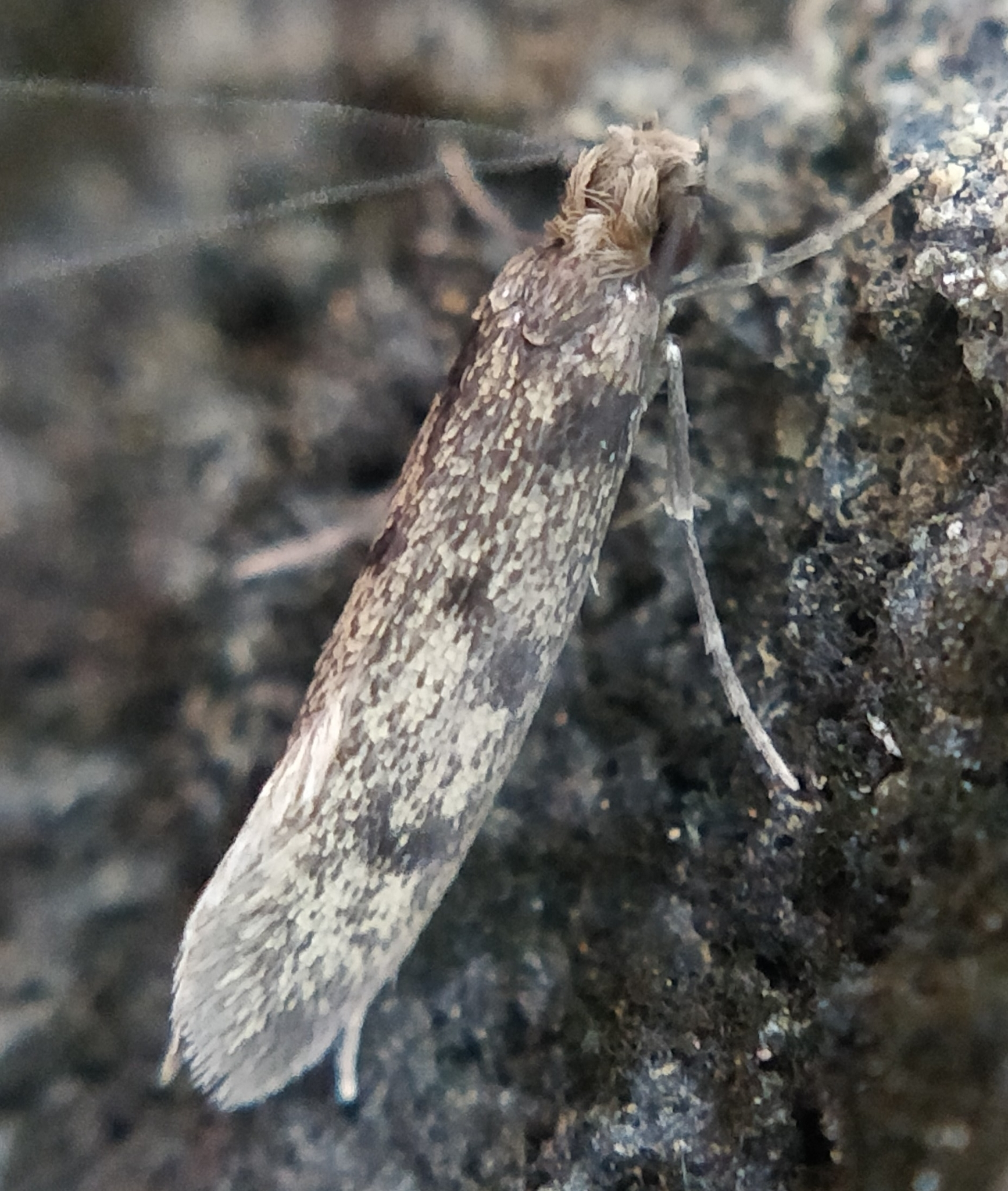

Scientific classification
- Kingdom: Animalia
- Phylum: Arthropoda
- Clade: Pancrustacea
- Class: Insecta
- Order: Lepidoptera
- Family: Tineidae
- Genus: Phereoeca
- Species: P. allutella

Binomial name
- Phereoeca allutella (Rebel, 1892)

Synonyms
- Tinea allutella (Rebel, 1892); Tinea verna Meyrick, 1924; Tineola allutella Rebel, 1892; and see text

= Phereoeca allutella =

Household case-bearing moth

Species of moth

Phereoeca allutella, the household case-bearing moth, belongs to the subfamily Tineinae of the fungus moth family (Tineidae). It was first described by Hans Rebel in 1892. It is an occasional pest of furs, flannel and similar materials, and has been inadvertently introduced to many places it is not originally native to.

== Description ==
The wingspan is 10–13 mm for females and 7–9 mm for males.

In the male genitals, the clasper's harpe tapers from the base, but is generally slender, with a conspicuous swelling on the basal third of the costal part which distinguishes this species. The gnathos is formed by two slim and curved parts; the uncus is likewise long and slim; it abruptly truncates at the end. The vinculum is broad, with a large slender saccus; the tegumen is elongated. The anellus is generally not sclerotized (hardened), and the aedeagus is somewhat more robust than the other organs, though not large, curves slightly, and is somewhat expanded near the tip. In the female genitals, the ostium is long and situated above two sclerotized horn-like swellings. The antrum is strongly sclerotized, with the ductus seminalis attaching slightly before it. The ductus bursae is delicate, with no conspicuous ornaments or structures, as is the bursa copulatrix; a signum is lacking.

== Distribution and ecology ==
It has been recorded from Panama, the Canary Islands and Madeira, Sierra Leone and perhaps elsewhere in Africa, the Seychelles, India, Java, and the Hawaiian Islands, Samoa and the Marquesas Islands (at least on Hiva Oa) in the Pacific. A record from Sri Lanka is more dubious; these individuals were described as a distinct species (Tinea pachyspila), but seem to be either P. allutella or the closely related and very similar plaster bagworm (P. uterella), which is sometimes also referred as "household casebearer".
