= Erechthias pachygramma =

Scientific classification
- Kingdom: Animalia
- Phylum: Arthropoda
- Clade: Pancrustacea
- Class: Insecta
- Order: Lepidoptera
- Family: Tineidae
- Genus: Erechthias
- Species: E. pachygramma

Binomial name
- Erechthias pachygramma (Meyrick, 1921)

Synonyms
- Decadarchis pachygramma Meyrick, 1921

Species of moth

Erechthias pachygramma is a moth of the family Tineidae first described by Edward Meyrick in 1921. It is found in Sri Lanka.
