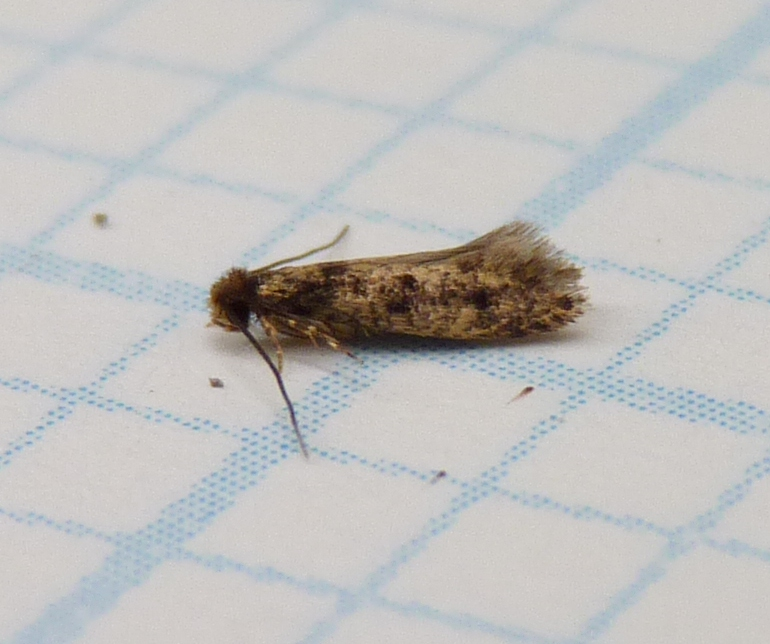

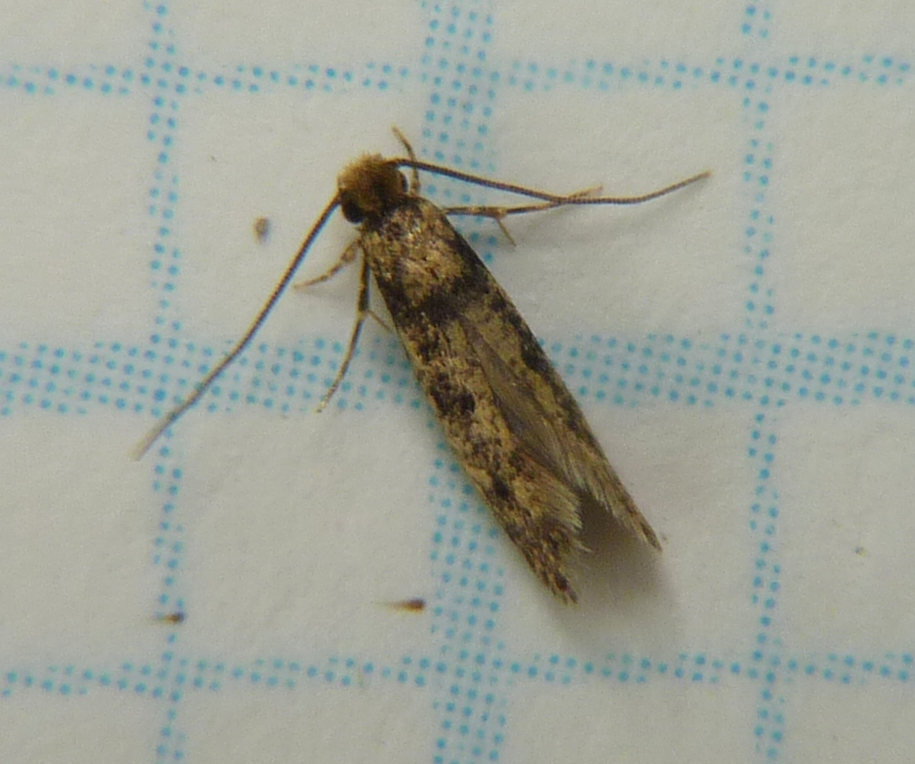

Scientific classification
- Kingdom: Animalia
- Phylum: Arthropoda
- Clade: Pancrustacea
- Class: Insecta
- Order: Lepidoptera
- Family: Tineidae
- Genus: Phereoeca
- Species: P. uterella

Binomial name
- Phereoeca uterella (Walsingham, 1897)

Synonyms
- Phereoeca dubitatrix; Phereoeca walsinghami; Tineola uterella Walsingham, 1897; Tinea barysticta Meyrick, 1927 (but see text); Tinea dubitatrix Meyrick, 1932; Tineola oblitescens Meyrick, 1924; Tinea pachyspila Meyrick, 1905 (but see text); Phereoeca postulata Gozmány, 1967; Tineola walsinghami Busck, 1934

= Phereoeca uterella =

Species of moth

Phereoeca uterella, known by the vernacular names plaster bagworm (Note: the term "bagworm" more properly refers to moths of family Psychidae, of which this species is not part) and household casebearer (Note: a name also used to refer to the closely related Phereoeca allutella), is a moth species in family Tineidae. It occurs in tropical climates, where it is common in houses, and is presumed native to the Neotropical realm. In the Americas, it has been recorded from Brazil, Guyana, and the southern United States as well as the Virgin Islands and Trinidad, and tentatively identified from Tobago.

As with other species of its genus, Phereoeca uterella has been the subject of taxonomical confusion, some of which is not yet fully resolved. The Sri Lankan case-bearing moth described as Tinea pachyspila and subsequently transferred to genus Phereoeca may either be considered to be this species, or to instead be Phereoeca allutella. Similarly, the Ugandan case-bearing moth originally described as Tinea barysticta may either be considered Phereoeca uterella or a valid species (as Phereoeca barysticta).

== Description ==
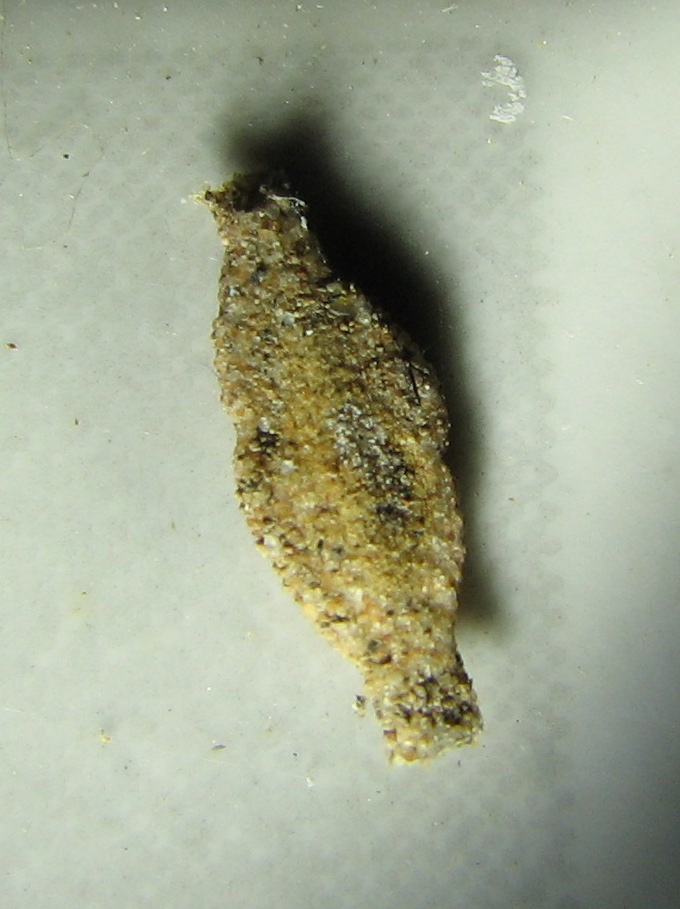
Larval case of Phereoeca uterella

The adult female has a wingspan of up to 13 mm. The forewings are gray with distinct dark spots and the plain hindwings are fringed with long gray hairs. The male is smaller (wingspan up to 9 mm) and more slender with less distinct markings. The reduced mouthparts suggest this species does not feed as an adult. The female lays up to 200 tiny pale blue eggs in sheltered places.

The larva constructs a protective case from silk and camouflages it with other materials such as soil, sand and insect droppings. When the larva is fully grown, this case is up to 14 mm long (twice the length of the animal) and is noticeably thickened in the middle so that it rather resembles a pumpkin seed. This shape allows the animal to turn around inside the case (the case has openings at both ends, both used by the head of the animal). Pupation occurs within the case.

The main food source for this species appears to be silk, especially spider webs, but also silk produced by other arthropods including discarded cases from the same species. Larvae also feed on dander and fallen human hair. Wool (but not cotton) is also a favoured food and the species can be a household pest.
