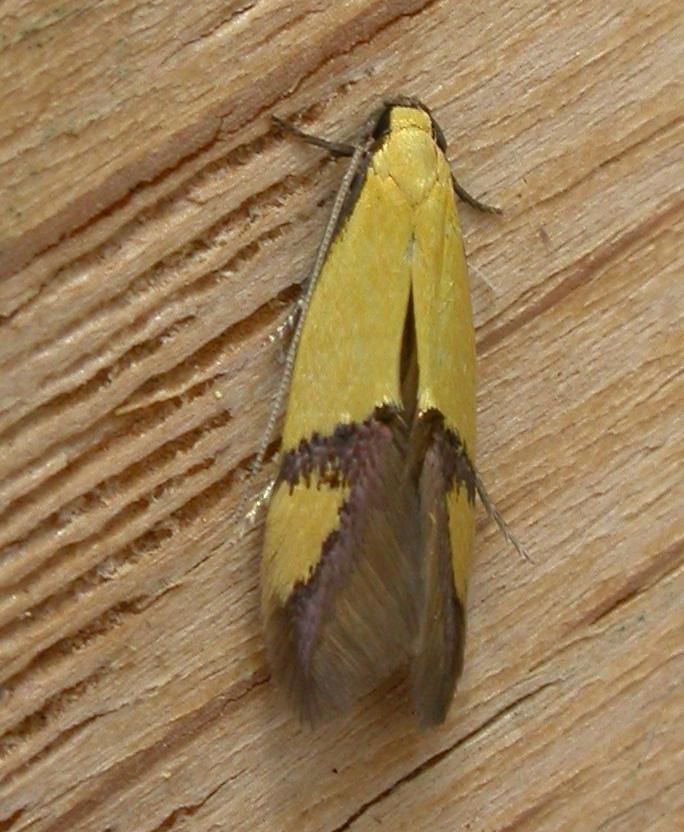

Scientific classification
- Kingdom: Animalia
- Phylum: Arthropoda
- Clade: Pancrustacea
- Class: Insecta
- Order: Lepidoptera
- Family: Tineidae
- Genus: Opogona
- Species: O. stereodyta

Binomial name
- Opogona stereodyta (Meyrick, 1897)

Synonyms
- Lozostoma stereodyta Meyrick, 1897

= Opogona stereodyta =

Species of moth

Opogona stereodyta (previously known as Lozostoma stereodyta) is a moth of the family Tineidae. It is found in southern Australia.

The adult moth of this species has yellow forewings each with a brown patch by the tornus and a transverse brown bar. The wingspan is about 1.3 cms.
