= Phruriastis =

Scientific classification
- Kingdom: Animalia
- Phylum: Arthropoda
- Clade: Pancrustacea
- Class: Insecta
- Order: Lepidoptera
- Family: Tineidae
- Genus: Phruriastis = Meyrick, 1923

Genus of moths

Phruriastis is a genus of moths belonging to the family Tineidae.

== Species ==
- Phruriastis meliphaga Meyrick, 1923 (from Fiji)
