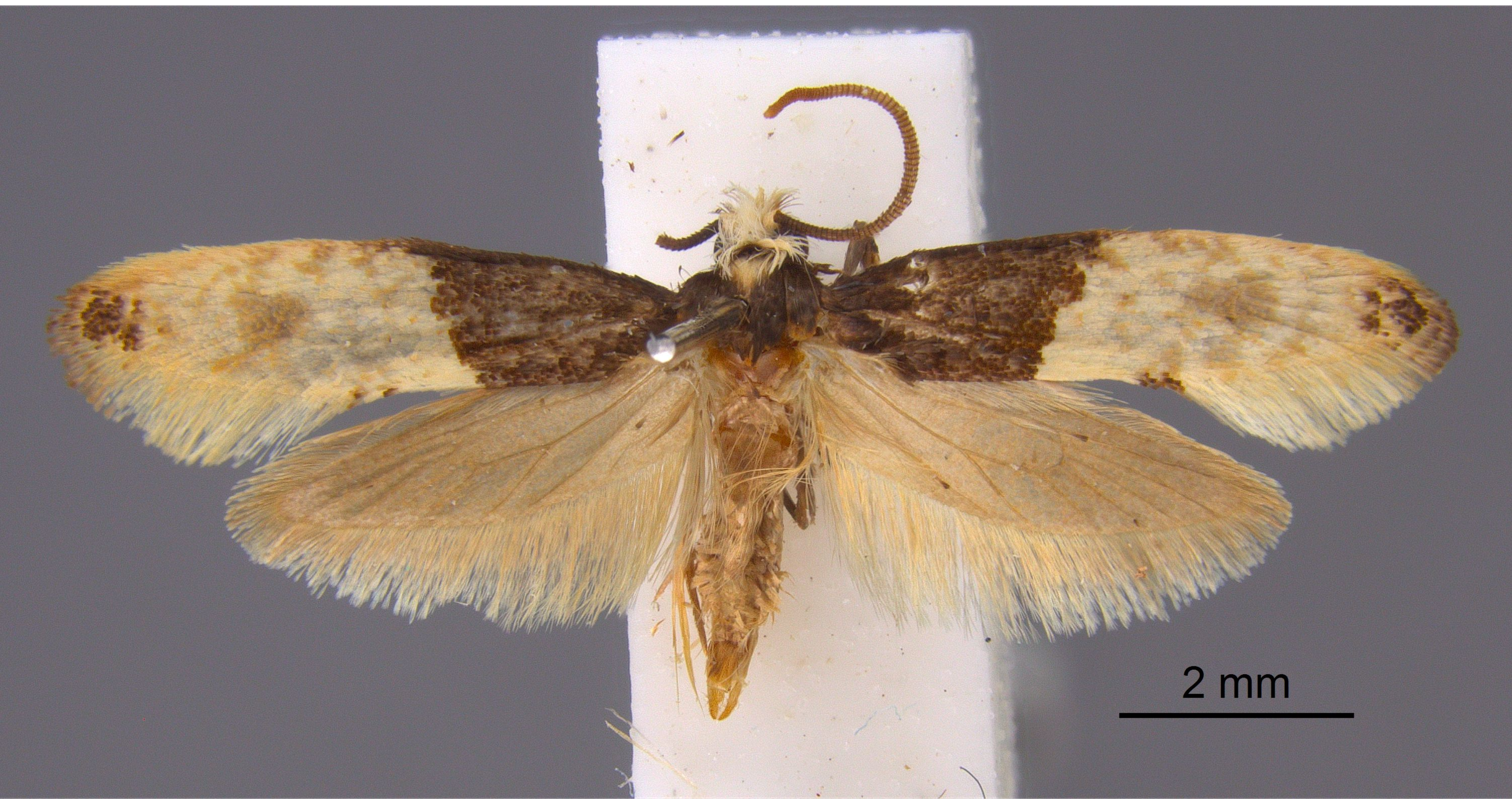
- Adult specimen

Scientific classification
- Kingdom: Animalia
- Phylum: Arthropoda
- Class: Insecta
- Order: Lepidoptera
- Family: Tineidae
- Genus: Trichophaga
- Species: T. tapetzella

Binomial name
- Trichophaga tapetzella (Linnaeus, 1758)

Synonyms
- Tinea tapetzella Linnaeus, 1758; Trichophaga palaestrica Butler, 1877; Trichophaga tapetiella (lapsus); Tinea pulchella Fabricius, 1794

= Carpet moth =

Species of moth

Trichophaga tapetzella, the tapestry moth or carpet moth, is a moth of the family Tineidae, commonly referred to as fungus moths. It is found worldwide.

The wingspan is 14–18 mm. The head is white, the forewings ochreous-white, thinly strigulated with grey; basal 2/5 dark purplish-fuscous; a roundish grey posterior discal spot; some small black spots about apex. Hindwings light brassy-grey.

The moth flies from June to September depending on the location.

The larvae feed on animal skin, bird nests, pellets, fur, clothing and floor and furniture covering made of animal skin. They can cause significant damage to carpets, clothes, and other household fabrics.

Tapestry moths complete their cycles within a year and are more like webbing clothes moths in that they spin webbing in areas where they like to reside. Their speed of development depends entirely upon local temperature, humidity and food supplies.
