= Gnathifera bidentella =

Scientific classification
- Kingdom: Animalia
- Phylum: Arthropoda
- Clade: Pancrustacea
- Class: Insecta
- Order: Lepidoptera
- Family: Epermeniidae
- Genus: Gnathifera
- Species: G. bidentella

Binomial name
- Gnathifera bidentella (Gaedike, 1981)

Synonyms
- Ochromolopis bidentata Gaedike, 1968 (preocc. Diakonoff, 1955); Ochromolopis bidentella Gaedike, 1981

Species of moth

Gnathifera bidentella is a fringe-tufted moth species. It was described by Reinhard Gaedike in 1981. It is found in Queensland, Australia.
