= Phaeoses chalinota =

Scientific classification
- Kingdom: Animalia
- Phylum: Arthropoda
- Class: Insecta
- Order: Lepidoptera
- Family: Tineidae
- Genus: Phaeoses
- Species: P. chalinota

Binomial name
- Phaeoses chalinota (Meyrick, 1910)

Synonyms
- Opogona chalinota Meyrick, 1910

Species of moth

Phaeoses chalinota is a moth of the family Tineidae described by Edward Meyrick in 1910. It is found in the India and Sri Lanka.

The wingspan is 7–10 mm. The forewings are dark fuscous bronze with a white line crossing the wing and a whitish-ochreous apical spot. The hindwings are dark grey.

The larvae feed on dry stems of Polypodium quercifolium.
