= Pseudopostega plicatella =

Scientific classification
- Kingdom: Animalia
- Phylum: Arthropoda
- Clade: Pancrustacea
- Class: Insecta
- Order: Lepidoptera
- Family: Opostegidae
- Genus: Pseudopostega
- Species: P. plicatella

Binomial name
- Pseudopostega plicatella Davis & Stonis, 2007

Species of moth

Pseudopostega plicatella is a moth of the family Opostegidae. It was described by Donald R. Davis and Jonas R. Stonis, 2007. It is known from Pará in north-eastern Brazil and east-central Ecuador.

The length of the forewings is 2.5–3.2 mm. Adults have been recorded in January.
