= Pseudopostega diskusi =

Scientific classification
- Kingdom: Animalia
- Phylum: Arthropoda
- Clade: Pancrustacea
- Class: Insecta
- Order: Lepidoptera
- Family: Opostegidae
- Genus: Pseudopostega
- Species: P. diskusi

Binomial name
- Pseudopostega diskusi Davis & Stonis, 2007

Species of moth

Pseudopostega diskusi is a moth of the family Opostegidae. It was described by Donald R. Davis and Jonas R. Stonis, 2007. It is only known from the Cayo District of central Belize.

The length of the forewings is 2.8–3.1 mm. Adults are mostly white. Adults have been collected in April.
