= Pseudopostega conicula =

Scientific classification
- Kingdom: Animalia
- Phylum: Arthropoda
- Clade: Pancrustacea
- Class: Insecta
- Order: Lepidoptera
- Family: Opostegidae
- Genus: Pseudopostega
- Species: P. conicula

Binomial name
- Pseudopostega conicula Davis & Stonis, 2007

Species of moth

Pseudopostega conicula is a moth of the family Opostegidae. It was described by Donald R. Davis and Jonas R. Stonis, 2007. It known only from the Guanacaste Province in north-western Costa Rica in lowland, seasonal dry forests.

The length of the forewings is 2.3–2.6 mm. Adults are on wing in July and August.
