= Pseudopostega divaricata =

Scientific classification
- Kingdom: Animalia
- Phylum: Arthropoda
- Clade: Pancrustacea
- Class: Insecta
- Order: Lepidoptera
- Family: Opostegidae
- Genus: Pseudopostega
- Species: P. divaricata

Binomial name
- Pseudopostega divaricata Davis & Stonis, 2007

Species of moth

Pseudopostega divaricata is a moth of the family Opostegidae. It was described by Donald R. Davis and Jonas R. Stonis, 2007. It is known from northern Argentina.

The length of the forewings is 3.5–4.8 mm. Adults have been recorded in January and November.

== Etymology ==
The species name is derived from the Latin divaricatus (meaning spread apart) in reference to the greatly divergent, furcate apex of the male gnathos.
