= Pseudopostega latisaccula =

Scientific classification
- Kingdom: Animalia
- Phylum: Arthropoda
- Clade: Pancrustacea
- Class: Insecta
- Order: Lepidoptera
- Family: Opostegidae
- Genus: Pseudopostega
- Species: P. latisaccula

Binomial name
- Pseudopostega latisaccula Davis & Stonis, 2007

Species of moth

Pseudopostega latisaccula is a moth of the family Opostegidae. It was described by Donald R. Davis and Jonas R. Stonis, 2007. It is probably widespread in the Greater Antilles but currently known only from Dominica (where it is common) and Puerto Rico.

The length of the forewings is 2–2.4 mm.
