= Pseudopostega ecuadoriana =

Scientific classification
- Kingdom: Animalia
- Phylum: Arthropoda
- Clade: Pancrustacea
- Class: Insecta
- Order: Lepidoptera
- Family: Opostegidae
- Genus: Pseudopostega
- Species: P. ecuadoriana

Binomial name
- Pseudopostega ecuadoriana Davis & Stonis, 2007

Species of moth

Pseudopostega ecuadoriana is a moth of the family Opostegidae. It was described by Donald R. Davis and Jonas R. Stonis, 2007. It is known from an Amazonian premontane rainforest in east-central Ecuador.

The length of the forewings is about 3.3 mm. Adults have been recorded in January.

== Etymology ==
The species name is derived from the country of origin, Ecuador.
