= Pseudopostega obtusa =

Scientific classification
- Kingdom: Animalia
- Phylum: Arthropoda
- Clade: Pancrustacea
- Class: Insecta
- Order: Lepidoptera
- Family: Opostegidae
- Genus: Pseudopostega
- Species: P. obtusa

Binomial name
- Pseudopostega obtusa Davis & Stonis, 2007

Species of moth

Pseudopostega obtusa is a moth of the family Opostegidae. It was described by Donald R. Davis and Jonas R. Stonis, 2007. It is known from northern Ecuador.

The length of the forewings is about 3.4 mm. Adults have been recorded in January.

== Etymology ==
The species name is derived from the Latin obtusus (meaning blunt, dull), in reference to the short, blunt apex of the male gnathos.
