= Pseudopostega tenuifurcata =

Scientific classification
- Kingdom: Animalia
- Phylum: Arthropoda
- Clade: Pancrustacea
- Class: Insecta
- Order: Lepidoptera
- Family: Opostegidae
- Genus: Pseudopostega
- Species: P. tenuifurcata

Binomial name
- Pseudopostega tenuifurcata Davis & Stonis, 2007

Species of moth

Pseudopostega tenuifurcata is a moth of the family Opostegidae. It was described by Donald R. Davis and Jonas R. Stonis, 2007. It is known from a lowland rainforest area in north-eastern Costa Rica

The length of the forewings is 2.3–2.5 mm. Adults have been recorded from January to May.
