= Neopostega falcata =

Scientific classification
- Kingdom: Animalia
- Phylum: Arthropoda
- Clade: Pancrustacea
- Class: Insecta
- Order: Lepidoptera
- Family: Opostegidae
- Genus: Neopostega
- Species: N. falcata

Binomial name
- Neopostega falcata Davis & Stonis, 2007

Species of moth

Neopostega falcata is a moth of the family Opostegidae. It is known only from a lowland rainforest in north-eastern Costa Rica.

The length of the forewings is about 2.1 mm. Adults are almost entirely white. Adults are on wing from March to April.
