= Pseudopostega duplicata =

Scientific classification
- Kingdom: Animalia
- Phylum: Arthropoda
- Clade: Pancrustacea
- Class: Insecta
- Order: Lepidoptera
- Family: Opostegidae
- Genus: Pseudopostega
- Species: P. duplicata

Binomial name
- Pseudopostega duplicata Davis & Stonis, 2007

Species of moth

Pseudopostega duplicata is a moth of the family Opostegidae. It was described by Donald R. Davis and Jonas R. Stonis, 2007. It is known from Costa Rica and Tortola in the British Virgin Islands.

The length of the forewings is 2–2.8 mm. Adults have been recorded almost throughout the year in Costa Rica and in April and July in the British Virgin Islands.
