= Pseudopostega dorsalis =

Scientific classification
- Kingdom: Animalia
- Phylum: Arthropoda
- Clade: Pancrustacea
- Class: Insecta
- Order: Lepidoptera
- Family: Opostegidae
- Genus: Pseudopostega
- Species: P. dorsalis

Binomial name
- Pseudopostega dorsalis Davis & Stonis, 2007

Species of moth

Pseudopostega dorsalis is a moth of the family Opostegidae. It was described by Donald R. Davis and Jonas R. Stonis, 2007. It is known from Costa Rica.

The length of the forewings for ssp. dorsalis is 2.2–3.3 mm.

== Subspecies ==
- Pseudopostega dorsalis dorsalis (Costa Rica)
- Pseudopostega dorsalis fasciata (Costa Rica)
