= Pseudopostega microacris =

Scientific classification
- Kingdom: Animalia
- Phylum: Arthropoda
- Clade: Pancrustacea
- Class: Insecta
- Order: Lepidoptera
- Family: Opostegidae
- Genus: Pseudopostega
- Species: P. microacris

Binomial name
- Pseudopostega microacris Davis & Stonis, 2007

Species of moth

Pseudopostega microacris is a moth of the family Opostegidae, identified in 2007 from north-eastern Costa Rica in lowland rainforest from 50 to 500 meters elevation. The forewing lengths range from 2.2 to 2.4 mm. Adults, mostly white, were collected in January and from October to November.
