= Pseudopostega caulifurcata =

Scientific classification
- Kingdom: Animalia
- Phylum: Arthropoda
- Clade: Pancrustacea
- Class: Insecta
- Order: Lepidoptera
- Family: Opostegidae
- Genus: Pseudopostega
- Species: P. caulifurcata

Binomial name
- Pseudopostega caulifurcata Davis & Stonis, 2007

Species of moth

Pseudopostega caulifurcata is a moth of the family Opostegidae. It was described by Donald R. Davis and Jonas R. Stonis, 2007. It is known from south-western Brazil.
