= Neopostega asymmetra =

Scientific classification
- Kingdom: Animalia
- Phylum: Arthropoda
- Clade: Pancrustacea
- Class: Insecta
- Order: Lepidoptera
- Family: Opostegidae
- Genus: Neopostega
- Species: N. asymmetra

Binomial name
- Neopostega asymmetra Davis & Stonis, 2007

Species of moth

Neopostega asymmetra is a moth of the family Opostegidae. It is known only from the type locality, in the Atlantic coastal forest in southern Brazil.

The length of the forewings is about 3 mm. Adults are almost entirely white. Adults are on wing in January

== Etymology ==
The species name is derived from the Greek asymmetros (without symmetry) in reference to the asymmetrical structure of the juxta in the male genitalia.
