= Pseudopostega gracilis =

Scientific classification
- Kingdom: Animalia
- Phylum: Arthropoda
- Clade: Pancrustacea
- Class: Insecta
- Order: Lepidoptera
- Family: Opostegidae
- Genus: Pseudopostega
- Species: P. gracilis

Binomial name
- Pseudopostega gracilis Davis & Stonis, 2007

Species of moth

Pseudopostega gracilis is a moth of the family Opostegidae. It was described by Donald R. Davis and Jonas R. Stonis, 2007. It is only known from primary rainforest in north-eastern French Guiana.

The length of the forewings is 2.3–2.5 mm. Adults have been collected in January.
