= Pseudopostega triangularis =

Scientific classification
- Kingdom: Animalia
- Phylum: Arthropoda
- Clade: Pancrustacea
- Class: Insecta
- Order: Lepidoptera
- Family: Opostegidae
- Genus: Pseudopostega
- Species: P. triangularis

Binomial name
- Pseudopostega triangularis Davis & Stonis, 2007

Species of moth

Pseudopostega triangularis is a moth of the family Opostegidae. It was described by Donald R. Davis and Jonas R. Stonis, 2007. It known only from the type locality, in the north-central forests of Argentina.

The length of the forewings is about 2.6 mm. Adults are on wing in November.
