= Neopostega distola =

Scientific classification
- Kingdom: Animalia
- Phylum: Arthropoda
- Clade: Pancrustacea
- Class: Insecta
- Order: Lepidoptera
- Family: Opostegidae
- Genus: Neopostega
- Species: N. distola

Binomial name
- Neopostega distola Davis & Stonis, 2007

Species of moth

Neopostega distola is a moth of the family Opostegidae. It is known only from south-western Brazil and northern Costa Rica.

The length of the forewings is 3.1–3.5 mm. Adults are almost entirely white. Adults are on wing in November.
