= Pseudopostega colognatha =

Scientific classification
- Kingdom: Animalia
- Phylum: Arthropoda
- Clade: Pancrustacea
- Class: Insecta
- Order: Lepidoptera
- Family: Opostegidae
- Genus: Pseudopostega
- Species: P. colognatha

Binomial name
- Pseudopostega colognatha Davis & Stonis, 2007

Species of moth

Pseudopostega colognatha is a moth of the family Opostegidae. It was described by Donald R. Davis and Jonas R. Stonis, 2007. It is known from Puerto Rico.

The length of the forewings is 1.8–2.1 mm. Adults have been recorded in August.

== Etymology ==
The species name is derived from the Greek kolos (meaning shortened, stunted) and gnathos (meaning jaw), in reference to the short, blunt apex of the gnathos as viewed ventrally.
