= Neopostega petila =

Scientific classification
- Kingdom: Animalia
- Phylum: Arthropoda
- Clade: Pancrustacea
- Class: Insecta
- Order: Lepidoptera
- Family: Opostegidae
- Genus: Neopostega
- Species: N. petila

Binomial name
- Neopostega petila Davis & Stonis, 2007

Species of moth

Neopostega petila is a moth of the family Opostegidae. It is known only from a lowland rainforest in north-eastern Costa Rica.

The length of the forewings is 2.3–2.6 mm. Adults are probably on wing year round and have been collected in February, April, July and October.
