= Pseudopostega rotunda =

Scientific classification
- Kingdom: Animalia
- Phylum: Arthropoda
- Clade: Pancrustacea
- Class: Insecta
- Order: Lepidoptera
- Family: Opostegidae
- Genus: Pseudopostega
- Species: P. rotunda

Binomial name
- Pseudopostega rotunda Davis & Stonis, 2007

Species of moth

Pseudopostega rotunda is a moth of the family Opostegidae. It was described by Donald R. Davis and Jonas R. Stonis, 2007. It is found known from the lowland forest of the La Selva Biological Reserve in north-eastern Costa Rica, the Guanacaste Province in north-western Costa Rica and the Napo Province in east-central Ecuador.

The length of the forewings is 1.9–2.1 mm. Adults are on wing from mid-February to mid-June in Costa Rica and in January in Ecuador.
