= Pseudopostega fumida =

Scientific classification
- Kingdom: Animalia
- Phylum: Arthropoda
- Clade: Pancrustacea
- Class: Insecta
- Order: Lepidoptera
- Family: Opostegidae
- Genus: Pseudopostega
- Species: P. fumida

Binomial name
- Pseudopostega fumida Davis & Stonis, 2007

Species of moth

Pseudopostega fumida is a moth of the family Opostegidae. It was described by Donald R. Davis and Jonas R. Stonis, 2007. It is only known from secondary, tropical forest in central Belize.

The length of the forewings is about 2.1 mm.
