= Pseudopostega denticulata =

Scientific classification
- Kingdom: Animalia
- Phylum: Arthropoda
- Clade: Pancrustacea
- Class: Insecta
- Order: Lepidoptera
- Family: Opostegidae
- Genus: Pseudopostega
- Species: P. denticulata

Binomial name
- Pseudopostega denticulata Davis & Stonis, 2007

Species of moth

Pseudopostega denticulata is a moth of the family Opostegidae. It was described by Donald R. Davis and Jonas R. Stonis, 2007. It is only known from eastern and western Ecuador.

The length of the forewings is about 2.3 mm. Adults are mostly white. Adults have been collected in January.

== Etymology ==
The specific name is derived from the Latin denticulata (covered with small denticles, pointed) as suggested by the laterally dentate gnathos diagnostic for this species.
