= Pseudopostega tanygnatha =

Scientific classification
- Kingdom: Animalia
- Phylum: Arthropoda
- Clade: Pancrustacea
- Class: Insecta
- Order: Lepidoptera
- Family: Opostegidae
- Genus: Pseudopostega
- Species: P. tanygnatha

Binomial name
- Pseudopostega tanygnatha Davis & Stonis, 2007

Species of moth

Pseudopostega tanygnatha is a moth of the family Opostegidae. It was described by Donald R. Davis and Jonas R. Stonis, 2007. It is known from north-western Costa Rica

The length of the forewings is about 2.3 mm. Adults have been recorded in June.

== Etymology ==
The species name is derived from the Greek tany (meaning long) and gnathos (meaning jaw) in reference to the slender, greatly elongated caudal lobe of the male gnathos.
