= Pseudopostega serrata =

Scientific classification
- Kingdom: Animalia
- Phylum: Arthropoda
- Clade: Pancrustacea
- Class: Insecta
- Order: Lepidoptera
- Family: Opostegidae
- Genus: Pseudopostega
- Species: P. serrata

Binomial name
- Pseudopostega serrata Davis & Stonis, 2007

Species of moth

Pseudopostega serrata is a moth of the family Opostegidae. It was described by Donald R. Davis and Jonas R. Stonis, 2007 . It is widespread in Costa Rica up to elevations of 1,520 meters. It has also been recorded from Ecuador and southern Panama.

The length of the forewings is 2.3–3.4 mm. Adults are mostly white. Adults are on wing through much of the year in Costa Rica, with known records from January, March, April, May and from July to September. There is one record for January in Ecuador and March in Panama.
