= Pseudopostega spatulata =

Scientific classification
- Kingdom: Animalia
- Phylum: Arthropoda
- Clade: Pancrustacea
- Class: Insecta
- Order: Lepidoptera
- Family: Opostegidae
- Genus: Pseudopostega
- Species: P. spatulata

Binomial name
- Pseudopostega spatulata Davis & Stonis, 2007

Species of moth

Pseudopostega spatulata is a moth of the family Opostegidae. It was described by Donald R. Davis and Jonas R. Stonis, 2007. It is known only from the La Selva Biological Station, a lowland rainforest area in north-eastern Costa Rica.

The length of the forewings is 2–2.4 mm. Adults are mostly white. Adults have been collected in February and September.
