= Pseudopostega turquinoensis =

Scientific classification
- Kingdom: Animalia
- Phylum: Arthropoda
- Clade: Pancrustacea
- Class: Insecta
- Order: Lepidoptera
- Family: Opostegidae
- Genus: Pseudopostega
- Species: P. turquinoensis

Binomial name
- Pseudopostega turquinoensis Davis & Stonis, 2007

Species of moth

Pseudopostega turquinoensis is a moth of the family Opostegidae. It was described by Donald R. Davis and Jonas R. Stonis, 2007. It is known from south-eastern Cuba.

The length of the forewings is 2.8–3.3 mm. Adults have been recorded in July.

== Etymology ==
The species name is in reference to the type locality, Turquino.
