= Pseudopostega ovatula =

Scientific classification
- Kingdom: Animalia
- Phylum: Arthropoda
- Clade: Pancrustacea
- Class: Insecta
- Order: Lepidoptera
- Family: Opostegidae
- Genus: Pseudopostega
- Species: P. ovatula

Binomial name
- Pseudopostega ovatula Davis & Stonis, 2007

Species of moth

Pseudopostega ovatula is a moth of the family Opostegidae. It was described by Donald R. Davis and Jonas R. Stonis, 2007. It is known only from lowland and pre-montane Amazonian rainforest in east-central Ecuador.

The length of the forewings is 2.1–2.3 mm. Adults are mostly white. Adults are on wing in January.
