= Pseudopostega floridensis =

Scientific classification
- Kingdom: Animalia
- Phylum: Arthropoda
- Clade: Pancrustacea
- Class: Insecta
- Order: Lepidoptera
- Family: Opostegidae
- Genus: Pseudopostega
- Species: P. floridensis

Binomial name
- Pseudopostega floridensis Davis & Stonis, 2007

Species of moth

Pseudopostega floridensis is a moth of the family Opostegidae. It was described by Donald R. Davis and Jonas R. Stonis, 2007. It is only known from southern Florida, United States.

The length of the forewings is about 2.4 mm.
