= Pseudopostega longipedicella =

Scientific classification
- Kingdom: Animalia
- Phylum: Arthropoda
- Clade: Pancrustacea
- Class: Insecta
- Order: Lepidoptera
- Family: Opostegidae
- Genus: Pseudopostega
- Species: P. longipedicella

Binomial name
- Pseudopostega longipedicella Davis & Stonis, 2007

Species of moth

Pseudopostega longipedicella is a moth of the family Opostegidae. It was described by Donald R. Davis and Jonas R. Stonis, 2007. It is known from Puntarenas in Costa Rica and the Canal Zone in Panama.

The length of the forewings is 2.3–3.7 mm. Adults have been recorded in April.
