= Pseudopostega acuminata =

Scientific classification
- Kingdom: Animalia
- Phylum: Arthropoda
- Clade: Pancrustacea
- Class: Insecta
- Order: Lepidoptera
- Family: Opostegidae
- Genus: Pseudopostega
- Species: P. acuminata

Binomial name
- Pseudopostega acuminata Davis & Stonis, 2007

Species of moth

Pseudopostega acuminata is a moth of the family Opostegidae. It was described by Donald R. Davis and Jonas R. Stonis, 2007. It is known from northern Argentina and north-western Venezuela.

The length of the forewings is 3.1–3.3 mm. Adults have been recorded in February (in Venezuela) and April (in Argentina).
