= Pseudopostega attenuata =

Scientific classification
- Kingdom: Animalia
- Phylum: Arthropoda
- Clade: Pancrustacea
- Class: Insecta
- Order: Lepidoptera
- Family: Opostegidae
- Genus: Pseudopostega
- Species: P. attenuata

Binomial name
- Pseudopostega attenuata Davis & Stonis, 2007

Species of moth

Pseudopostega attenuata is a moth of the family Opostegidae. It was described by Donald R. Davis and Jonas R. Stonis, 2007. It is probably a rather widespread species in the South American lowland tropics. The species is known from Costa Rica, north-western Brazil and south-western Ecuador.

The length of the forewings is 1.8–2.2 mm. Adults have been found from February to June in Costa Rica and Brazil and in January in Ecuador.
