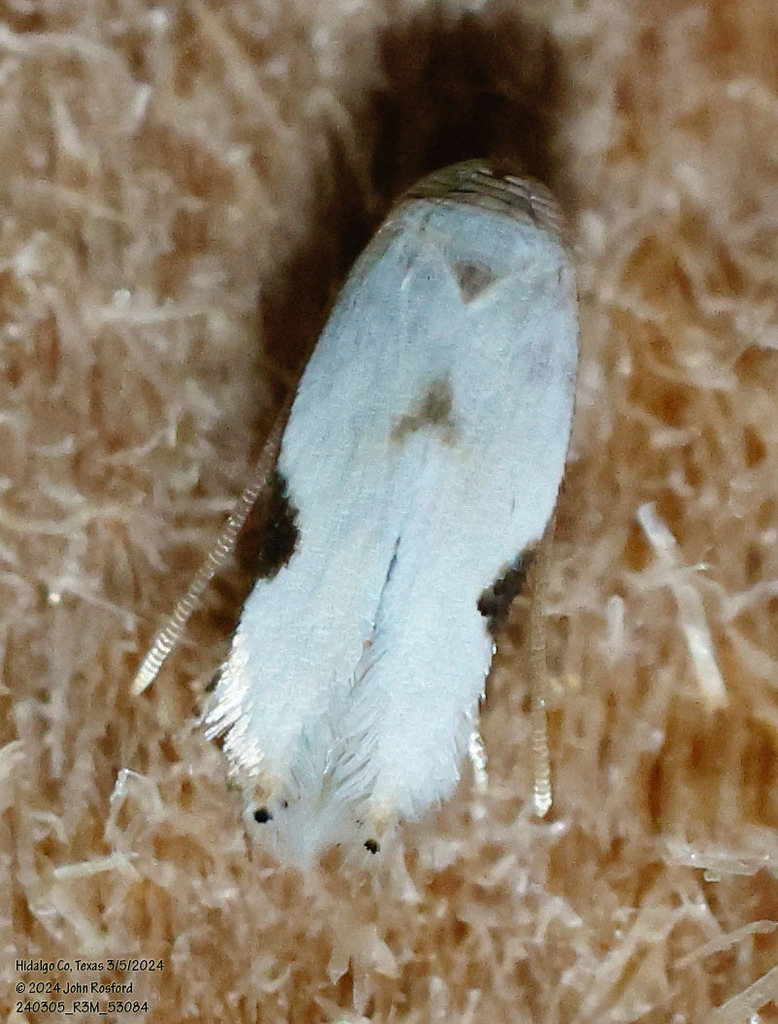

Scientific classification
- Kingdom: Animalia
- Phylum: Arthropoda
- Clade: Pancrustacea
- Class: Insecta
- Order: Lepidoptera
- Family: Opostegidae
- Genus: Pseudopostega
- Species: P. texana

Binomial name
- Pseudopostega texana Davis & Stonis, 2007

= Pseudopostega texana =

Species of moth

Pseudopostega texana is a moth of the family Opostegidae. It was described by Donald R. Davis and Jonas R. Stonis, 2007. It is known from the Rio Grande Valley of southern Texas, probably south into Mexico.

The length of the forewings is 2.5–3 mm. Adults have been recorded in April and from July to early October.

== Etymology ==
The species name is derived from the general type locality, Texas.
