= Pseudopostega apotoma =

Scientific classification
- Kingdom: Animalia
- Phylum: Arthropoda
- Clade: Pancrustacea
- Class: Insecta
- Order: Lepidoptera
- Family: Opostegidae
- Genus: Pseudopostega
- Species: P. apotoma

Binomial name
- Pseudopostega apotoma Davis & Stonis, 2007

Species of moth

Pseudopostega apotoma is a moth of the family Opostegidae. It was described by Donald R. Davis and Jonas R. Stonis, 2007. It is only known from Minas Gerais and Pará in south-eastern and north-eastern Brazil.

The length of the forewings is 3.4–3.7 mm. Adults are mostly white. Adults have been collected in January and November.
