= Pseudopostega paraplicatella =

Scientific classification
- Kingdom: Animalia
- Phylum: Arthropoda
- Clade: Pancrustacea
- Class: Insecta
- Order: Lepidoptera
- Family: Opostegidae
- Genus: Pseudopostega
- Species: P. paraplicatella

Binomial name
- Pseudopostega paraplicatella Davis & Stonis, 2007

Species of moth

Pseudopostega paraplicatella is a moth of the family Opostegidae. It was described by Donald R. Davis and Jonas R. Stonis, 2007. It is known from Amazonian rainforest of eastern Ecuador.

The length of the forewings is about 3 mm. Adults have been recorded in January.
