= Pseudopostega sectila =

Scientific classification
- Kingdom: Animalia
- Phylum: Arthropoda
- Clade: Pancrustacea
- Class: Insecta
- Order: Lepidoptera
- Family: Opostegidae
- Genus: Pseudopostega
- Species: P. sectila

Binomial name
- Pseudopostega sectila Davis & Stonis, 2007

Species of moth

Pseudopostega sectila is a moth of the family Opostegidae. It was described by Donald R. Davis and Jonas R. Stonis, 2007. It is known from Puerto Rico and Tortola in the British Virgin Islands.

The length of the forewings is 3–3.7 mm. Adults have been recorded in July.
