= Pseudopostega suffuscula =

Scientific classification
- Kingdom: Animalia
- Phylum: Arthropoda
- Clade: Pancrustacea
- Class: Insecta
- Order: Lepidoptera
- Family: Opostegidae
- Genus: Pseudopostega
- Species: P. suffuscula

Binomial name
- Pseudopostega suffuscula Davis & Stonis, 2007

Species of moth

Pseudopostega suffuscula is a moth of the family Opostegidae. It was described by Donald R. Davis and Jonas R. Stonis, 2007. It is known from the provinces of Salta and Tucumán in northern Argentina.

The length of the forewings is 2.4–3 mm. Adults have been recorded from November to January.
