= Pseudopostega crassifurcata =

Scientific classification
- Kingdom: Animalia
- Phylum: Arthropoda
- Clade: Pancrustacea
- Class: Insecta
- Order: Lepidoptera
- Family: Opostegidae
- Genus: Pseudopostega
- Species: P. crassifurcata

Binomial name
- Pseudopostega crassifurcata Davis & Stonis, 2007

Species of moth

Pseudopostega crassifurcata is a moth of the family Opostegidae. It was described by Donald R. Davis and Jonas R. Stonis, 2007. It is known from the Sierra Maestra of south-eastern Cuba.

The length of the forewings is about 2.5 mm. Adults have been recorded in July.
