= Pseudopostega brevivalva =

Scientific classification
- Kingdom: Animalia
- Phylum: Arthropoda
- Clade: Pancrustacea
- Class: Insecta
- Order: Lepidoptera
- Family: Opostegidae
- Genus: Pseudopostega
- Species: P. brevivalva

Binomial name
- Pseudopostega brevivalva Davis & Stonis, 2007

Species of moth

Pseudopostega brevivalva is a moth of the family Opostegidae. It was described by Donald R. Davis and Jonas R. Stonis, 2007. It is known from Costa Rica.

The length of the forewings is about 2–2.8 mm. Adults have been recorded in February, April and July.

== Etymology ==
The species name is derived from the Latin brevis (meaning short) and valva (meaning leaf of a folding door), in reference to the unusually short length of the male valvae.
