= Pseudopostega curtarama =

Scientific classification
- Kingdom: Animalia
- Phylum: Arthropoda
- Clade: Pancrustacea
- Class: Insecta
- Order: Lepidoptera
- Family: Opostegidae
- Genus: Pseudopostega
- Species: P. curtarama

Binomial name
- Pseudopostega curtarama Davis & Stonis, 2007

Species of moth

Pseudopostega curtarama is a moth of the family Opostegidae. It was described by Donald R. Davis and Jonas R. Stonis, 2007. It is known from the provinces of Goias and Minas Gerais in southern Brazil.
