= Eosopostega issikii =

Scientific classification
- Kingdom: Animalia
- Phylum: Arthropoda
- Clade: Pancrustacea
- Class: Insecta
- Order: Lepidoptera
- Family: Opostegidae
- Genus: Eosopostega
- Species: E. issikii

Binomial name
- Eosopostega issikii D.R. Davis, 1988

Species of moth

Eosopostega issikii is a species of moth of the family Opostegidae. It is known only from the Izu Peninsula in south-central Honshu and from Kagoshima at the south-western tip of Kyushu.

The length of the forewings is about 3.8 mm for males. Adults are on wing in June in one generation.
