= Pseudopostega resimafurcata =

Scientific classification
- Kingdom: Animalia
- Phylum: Arthropoda
- Clade: Pancrustacea
- Class: Insecta
- Order: Lepidoptera
- Family: Opostegidae
- Genus: Pseudopostega
- Species: P. resimafurcata

Binomial name
- Pseudopostega resimafurcata Davis & Stonis, 2007

Species of moth

Pseudopostega resimafurcata is a moth of the family Opostegidae. It was described by Donald R. Davis and Jonas R. Stonis, 2007. It is known from south-eastern Brazil.

The length of the forewings is about 4.1 mm. Adults have been recorded in October.

== Etymology ==
The species name is derived from the Latin resimus (meaning turned up, bent back) and furcatus (meaning forked) in reference to the dorsally curved, furcate apex of the male gnathos.
