= Pseudopostega acrodicra =

Scientific classification
- Kingdom: Animalia
- Phylum: Arthropoda
- Clade: Pancrustacea
- Class: Insecta
- Order: Lepidoptera
- Family: Opostegidae
- Genus: Pseudopostega
- Species: P. acrodicra

Binomial name
- Pseudopostega acrodicra D.R. Davis & J.R. Stonis, 2007

Species of moth

Pseudopostega acrodicra is a moth of the family Opostegidae. It was described by Donald R. Davis and Jonas R. Stonis, 2007. It is known from south-central Brazil.

The length of the forewings is 5-5.6 mm. Adults have been recorded from September to November.

== Etymology ==
The species name is derived from the Greek akron (meaning tip, end) and dikros (meaning forked, cloven) in reference to the small, apical furcation of the caudal lobe of the male gnathos.
