= Pseudopostega bicornuta =

Scientific classification
- Kingdom: Animalia
- Phylum: Arthropoda
- Clade: Pancrustacea
- Class: Insecta
- Order: Lepidoptera
- Family: Opostegidae
- Genus: Pseudopostega
- Species: P. bicornuta

Binomial name
- Pseudopostega bicornuta Davis & Stonis, 2007

Species of moth

Pseudopostega bicornuta is a moth of the family Opostegidae. It was described by Donald R. Davis and Jonas R. Stonis, 2007. It is known from southern Mexico.

The length of the forewings is about 4.6 mm. Adults have been recorded in June.

== Etymology ==
The species name is derived from the Latin bi (meaning two) and cornutus (meaning horn) in reference to the dorsally curved, furcate apex of the male gnathos.
