= Pseudopostega beckeri =

Scientific classification
- Kingdom: Animalia
- Phylum: Arthropoda
- Clade: Pancrustacea
- Class: Insecta
- Order: Lepidoptera
- Family: Opostegidae
- Genus: Pseudopostega
- Species: P. beckeri

Binomial name
- Pseudopostega beckeri Davis & Stonis, 2007

Species of moth

Pseudopostega beckeri is a moth of the family Opostegidae. It was described by Donald R. Davis and Jonas R. Stonis, 2007. It is known from the states of Goias, Minas Gerais and Parana in south-central Brazil.

The length of the forewings is 3.7–4.4 mm. Adults have been recorded in November.

== Etymology ==
It is named in honor of Dr. Vitor O. Becker.
