= Pseudopostega ferruginea =

Scientific classification
- Kingdom: Animalia
- Phylum: Arthropoda
- Clade: Pancrustacea
- Class: Insecta
- Order: Lepidoptera
- Family: Opostegidae
- Genus: Pseudopostega
- Species: P. ferruginea

Binomial name
- Pseudopostega ferruginea Davis & Stonis, 2007

Species of moth

Pseudopostega ferruginea is a moth of the family Opostegidae. It was described by Donald R. Davis and Jonas R. Stonis, 2007. It is endemic to the West Indies, where it has been found in Puerto Rico and St. Thomas.

The length of the forewings is 2.1–2.9 mm. Adults are mostly white. Adults have been collected in March and July.
