= Neopostega longispina =

Scientific classification
- Kingdom: Animalia
- Phylum: Arthropoda
- Clade: Pancrustacea
- Class: Insecta
- Order: Lepidoptera
- Family: Opostegidae
- Genus: Neopostega
- Species: N. longispina

Binomial name
- Neopostega longispina Davis & Stonis, 2007

Species of moth

Neopostega longispina is a moth of the family Opostegidae. It is known only from lowland Amazonian rainforest in southern Venezuela near the Brazilian border.

The length of the forewings is 2.8–3 mm. Adults are mostly white. Adults are on wing in February.
