= Pseudopostega tucumanae =

Scientific classification
- Kingdom: Animalia
- Phylum: Arthropoda
- Clade: Pancrustacea
- Class: Insecta
- Order: Lepidoptera
- Family: Opostegidae
- Genus: Pseudopostega
- Species: P. tucumanae

Binomial name
- Pseudopostega tucumanae Davis & Stonis, 2007

Species of moth

Pseudopostega tucumanae is a moth of the family Opostegidae. It was described by Donald R. Davis and Jonas R. Stonis, 2007. It is only known from the province of Tucuman, in northern Argentina at an elevation of 800 meters.

The length of the forewings is 3.1–4 mm. Adults are mostly white. Adults have been collected in December and February.

== Etymology ==
The specific epithet is derived from Tucuman, the province in Argentina from whence the type series was collected.
