= Pseudopostega contigua =

Scientific classification
- Kingdom: Animalia
- Phylum: Arthropoda
- Clade: Pancrustacea
- Class: Insecta
- Order: Lepidoptera
- Family: Opostegidae
- Genus: Pseudopostega
- Species: P. contigua

Binomial name
- Pseudopostega contigua Davis & Stonis, 2007

Species of moth

Pseudopostega contigua is a moth of the family Opostegidae. It was described by Donald R. Davis and Jonas R. Stonis, 2007. It is known from riparian forest along the Rio Negro of southern Venezuela.

The length of the forewings is about 2 mm (0.079 in). Adults have been recorded in December.

== Etymology ==
The species name is derived from the Latin contiguus (meaning near, adjacent) in reference to the paired, contiguous, apical lobes of the male gnathos.
