= Pseudopostega uncinata =

Scientific classification
- Kingdom: Animalia
- Phylum: Arthropoda
- Clade: Pancrustacea
- Class: Insecta
- Order: Lepidoptera
- Family: Opostegidae
- Genus: Pseudopostega
- Species: P. uncinata

Binomial name
- Pseudopostega uncinata Davis & Stonis, 2007

Species of moth

Pseudopostega uncinata is a moth of the family Opostegidae. It was described by Donald R. Davis and Jonas R. Stonis, 2007. It is only known from a general savanna habitat with some adjacent gallery forests in north-central Venezuela.

The length of the forewings is 2.5–3.1 mm.
