= Pseudopostega latifurcata =

Scientific classification
- Kingdom: Animalia
- Phylum: Arthropoda
- Clade: Pancrustacea
- Class: Insecta
- Order: Lepidoptera
- Family: Opostegidae
- Genus: Pseudopostega
- Species: P. latifurcata

Binomial name
- Pseudopostega latifurcata Davis & Stonis, 2007

Species of moth

Pseudopostega latifurcata is a moth of the family Opostegidae. It was described by Donald R. Davis and Jonas R. Stonis, 2007. It is known from Puerto Rico, the Virgin Islands, Dominica and Costa Rica.

The length of the forewings of ssp. latifurcata is 2.6–3 mm. Adults of this subspecies have been recorded from June to August. The length of the forewings of ssp. apoclina is 2.5–2.8 mm. Adults of this subspecies have been recorded in January, March, April, July and August.

== Subspecies ==
- Pseudopostega latifurcata latifurcata (Puerto Rico, the Virgin Islands and Dominica)
- Pseudopostega latifurcata apoclina (Costa Rica)
