= Pseudopostega subtila =

Scientific classification
- Kingdom: Animalia
- Phylum: Arthropoda
- Clade: Pancrustacea
- Class: Insecta
- Order: Lepidoptera
- Family: Opostegidae
- Genus: Pseudopostega
- Species: P. subtila

Binomial name
- Pseudopostega subtila Davis & Stonis, 2007

Species of moth

Pseudopostega subtila is a moth of the family Opostegidae. It was described by Donald R. Davis and Jonas R. Stonis, 2007. It is known from the state of Minas Gerais of south-eastern Brazil.

The length of the forewings is about 3.8 mm. Adults have been recorded in December.

== Etymology ==
The species name is derived from the Latin subtilis (meaning thin, slender, acute) in reference to the elongate, slender, caudal lobe of the male gnathos.
