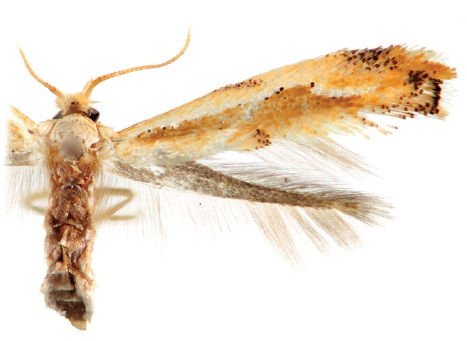

Scientific classification
- Kingdom: Animalia
- Phylum: Arthropoda
- Class: Insecta
- Order: Lepidoptera
- Family: Tineidae
- Genus: Philonome
- Species: P. penerivifera

Binomial name
- Philonome penerivifera Sohn & Davis, 2015

= Philonome penerivifera =

Species of moth

Philonome penerivifera is a species of moth of the family Tineidae. It is found in Brazil (Amazonas, Federal District, Pará).

The length of the forewings is 3.2–3.6 mm. The coloration and patterns of the forewings are similar to those of Philonome rivifera. The hindwings are dark brownish grey.

== Etymology ==
The species name refers to the overall similarity to Philonome rivifera and is derived from the name of that species plus the Latin prefix pene or paene (meaning almost).
