= Pseudopostega lateriplicata =

Scientific classification
- Kingdom: Animalia
- Phylum: Arthropoda
- Clade: Pancrustacea
- Class: Insecta
- Order: Lepidoptera
- Family: Opostegidae
- Genus: Pseudopostega
- Species: P. lateriplicata

Binomial name
- Pseudopostega lateriplicata Davis & Stonis, 2007

Species of moth

Pseudopostega lateriplicata is a moth of the family Opostegidae. It was described by Donald R. Davis and Jonas R. Stonis, 2007. It is only known from the La Selva Biological Reserve, a lowland rainforest area in north-eastern Costa Rica.

The length of the forewings is about 1.9 mm.
