= Pseudopostega sublobata =

Scientific classification
- Kingdom: Animalia
- Phylum: Arthropoda
- Clade: Pancrustacea
- Class: Insecta
- Order: Lepidoptera
- Family: Opostegidae
- Genus: Pseudopostega
- Species: P. sublobata

Binomial name
- Pseudopostega sublobata Davis & Stonis, 2007

Species of moth

Pseudopostega sublobata is a moth of the family Opostegidae. It was described by Donald R. Davis and Jonas R. Stonis, 2007. It is known from Costa Rica and Ecuador.

The length of the forewings is 2.1–2.5 mm. Adults have been recorded over much of the year, from February to October in Costa Rica and during January in Ecuador.
