= Pseudopostega clavata =

Scientific classification
- Kingdom: Animalia
- Phylum: Arthropoda
- Clade: Pancrustacea
- Class: Insecta
- Order: Lepidoptera
- Family: Opostegidae
- Genus: Pseudopostega
- Species: P. clavata

Binomial name
- Pseudopostega clavata Davis & Stonis, 2007

Species of moth

Pseudopostega clavata is a moth of the family Opostegidae. It was described by Donald R. Davis and Jonas R. Stonis, 2007. It is known from south-eastern Puerto Rico.

The length of the forewings is 2.2–2.6 mm. Adults have been recorded in August.

== Etymology ==
The species name is derived from the Latin clavatus (meaning clubbed), in reference to the diagnostic, clavate shape of the apex of the greatly enlarged basal fold of the male gnathos.
