= Pseudopostega constricta =

Scientific classification
- Kingdom: Animalia
- Phylum: Arthropoda
- Clade: Pancrustacea
- Class: Insecta
- Order: Lepidoptera
- Family: Opostegidae
- Genus: Pseudopostega
- Species: P. constricta

Binomial name
- Pseudopostega constricta Davis & Stonis, 2007

Species of moth

Pseudopostega constricta is a moth of the family Opostegidae. It was described by Donald R. Davis and Jonas R. Stonis, 2007. It is known from the state of Chiapas in southern Mexico.

The length of the forewings is 3.7–5 mm. Adults have been recorded in June.

== Etymology ==
The species name is derived from the Latin constrictus (meaning drawn together, contracted) in reference to the strongly constricted male gnathos.
