= Pseudopostega galapagosae =

Scientific classification
- Kingdom: Animalia
- Phylum: Arthropoda
- Clade: Pancrustacea
- Class: Insecta
- Order: Lepidoptera
- Family: Opostegidae
- Genus: Pseudopostega
- Species: P. galapagosae

Binomial name
- Pseudopostega galapagosae Davis & Stonis, 2007

Species of moth

Pseudopostega galapagosae is a moth of the family Opostegidae. It was described by Donald R. Davis and Jonas R. Stonis, 2007. It is probably endemic to the Galápagos Islands where it has been collected on the islands of Fernandina, Isabela, San Cristóbal, Santa Cruz and Santiago.

The length of the forewings is 2.3–3.4 mm. Adults have been recorded from January to May.
