= Pseudopostega monstruosa =

Scientific classification
- Kingdom: Animalia
- Phylum: Arthropoda
- Clade: Pancrustacea
- Class: Insecta
- Order: Lepidoptera
- Family: Opostegidae
- Genus: Pseudopostega
- Species: P. monstruosa

Binomial name
- Pseudopostega monstruosa Davis & Stonis, 2007

Species of moth

Pseudopostega monstruosa is a moth of the family Opostegidae. It was described by Donald R. Davis and Jonas R. Stonis, 2007. It is only known from Amazonian premontane rainforest in east-central Ecuador.

The length of the forewings is about 3 mm. Adults are mostly white. Adults have been collected in January.
