= Pseudopostega lobata =

Scientific classification
- Kingdom: Animalia
- Phylum: Arthropoda
- Clade: Pancrustacea
- Class: Insecta
- Order: Lepidoptera
- Family: Opostegidae
- Genus: Pseudopostega
- Species: P. lobata

Binomial name
- Pseudopostega lobata Davis & Stonis, 2007

Species of moth

Pseudopostega lobata is a moth of the family Opostegidae. It was described by Donald R. Davis and Jonas R. Stonis, 2007. It is probably a common, widespread neotropical species, now reported in Central America from Belize to Costa Rica, with two records from northern Argentina.

The length of the forewings is 2–2.4 mm. In Central America, adults have been recorded over much of the year from January to August and October, with only November reported for Argentina.
