= Pseudopostega truncata =

Scientific classification
- Kingdom: Animalia
- Phylum: Arthropoda
- Clade: Pancrustacea
- Class: Insecta
- Order: Lepidoptera
- Family: Opostegidae
- Genus: Pseudopostega
- Species: P. truncata

Binomial name
- Pseudopostega truncata Davis & Stonis, 2007

Species of moth

Pseudopostega truncata is a moth of the family Opostegidae. It was described by Donald R. Davis and Jonas R. Stonis, 2007. It is only known from central Brazil.

The length of the forewings is about 3.8 mm. Adults have been collected in December and January.
