= Pseudopostega latiapicula =

Scientific classification
- Kingdom: Animalia
- Phylum: Arthropoda
- Clade: Pancrustacea
- Class: Insecta
- Order: Lepidoptera
- Family: Opostegidae
- Genus: Pseudopostega
- Species: P. latiapicula

Binomial name
- Pseudopostega latiapicula Davis & Stonis, 2007

Species of moth

Pseudopostega latiapicula is a moth of the family Opostegidae. It was described by Donald R. Davis and Jonas R. Stonis, 2007. It is known from the La Selva Biological Station of north-eastern Costa Rica and the state of Paraná in north-eastern Brazil.

The length of the forewings is about 2.4 mm. Adults have been recorded in January, February and August.
