= Pseudopostega bidorsalis =

Scientific classification
- Kingdom: Animalia
- Phylum: Arthropoda
- Clade: Pancrustacea
- Class: Insecta
- Order: Lepidoptera
- Family: Opostegidae
- Genus: Pseudopostega
- Species: P. bidorsalis

Binomial name
- Pseudopostega bidorsalis Davis & Stonis, 2007

Species of moth

Pseudopostega bidorsalis is a moth of the family Opostegidae. It was described by Donald R. Davis and Jonas R. Stonis, 2007. It is known from northern Costa Rica.

The length of the forewings is 2.5–3 mm. Adults have been recorded from August to October and January.
