= Pseudopostega monosperma =

Scientific classification
- Kingdom: Animalia
- Phylum: Arthropoda
- Class: Insecta
- Order: Lepidoptera
- Family: Opostegidae
- Genus: Pseudopostega
- Species: P. monosperma

Binomial name
- Pseudopostega monosperma (Meyrick, 1931)

Synonyms
- Opostega monosperma Meyrick, 1931

Species of moth

Pseudopostega monosperma is a moth of the family Opostegidae. It was described by Edward Meyrick in 1931. It is known from Bahia, Brazil.

The length of the forewings is about 3.6 mm.
