= Paralopostega maculata =

Scientific classification
- Domain: Eukaryota
- Kingdom: Animalia
- Phylum: Arthropoda
- Class: Insecta
- Order: Lepidoptera
- Family: Opostegidae
- Genus: Paralopostega
- Species: P. maculata

Binomial name
- Paralopostega maculata (Walsingham, 1907)

Synonyms
- Opostega maculata Walsingham, 1907

Species of moth

Paralopostega maculata is a moth of the family Opostegidae. It was first described by Lord Walsingham in 1907. It is endemic to the Hawaiian islands of Oahu and Molokai.

The larvae feed on Melicope oblongifolia and Melicope rotundifolia. They mine the leaves of their host plant.
