= Pseudopostega acidata =

Scientific classification
- Kingdom: Animalia
- Phylum: Arthropoda
- Class: Insecta
- Order: Lepidoptera
- Family: Opostegidae
- Genus: Pseudopostega
- Species: P. acidata

Binomial name
- Pseudopostega acidata (Meyrick, 1915)

Synonyms
- Opostega acidata Meyrick, 1915

Species of moth

Pseudopostega acidata is a moth of the family Opostegidae. It was described by Edward Meyrick in 1915. It is known from the Rio Grand Valley of southern Texas and southern Ecuador.

The length of the forewings is 2.7–4.1 mm. Adults have been recorded in June (in Ecuador) and from September to November (in southern Texas).
