= Pseudopostega chalcopepla =

Scientific classification
- Kingdom: Animalia
- Phylum: Arthropoda
- Class: Insecta
- Order: Lepidoptera
- Family: Opostegidae
- Genus: Pseudopostega
- Species: P. chalcopepla

Binomial name
- Pseudopostega chalcopepla (Walsingham, 1908)

Synonyms
- Opostega chalcopepla Walsingham, 1908; Opostega rosmarinella (unavailable name)

Species of moth

Pseudopostega chalcopepla is a moth of the family Opostegidae. It is known from southern France, Monaco and the Iberian Peninsula, as well as Morocco and Tunisia. It is only found in the coastal region.

The wingspan is 10.5–14 mm. Adults are on wing from June to July.

The larvae possibly feed on Rosmarinus species.
