= Pseudopostega fungina =

Scientific classification
- Kingdom: Animalia
- Phylum: Arthropoda
- Class: Insecta
- Order: Lepidoptera
- Family: Opostegidae
- Genus: Pseudopostega
- Species: P. fungina

Binomial name
- Pseudopostega fungina Puplesis & Robinson, 1999

Species of moth

Pseudopostega fungina is a species of moth of the family Opostegidae. It was described by Puplesis and Robinson in 1999. It is known only from Bihar in India.
