= Pseudopostega myxodes =

Scientific classification
- Kingdom: Animalia
- Phylum: Arthropoda
- Class: Insecta
- Order: Lepidoptera
- Family: Opostegidae
- Genus: Pseudopostega
- Species: P. myxodes

Binomial name
- Pseudopostega myxodes Meyrick, 1916

Synonyms
- Opostega myxodes Meyrick, 1916

Species of moth

Pseudopostega myxodes is a moth of the family Opostegidae. It was described by Edward Meyrick in 1916. It is known from Bihar, India.
