= Pseudopostega spilodes =

Scientific classification
- Kingdom: Animalia
- Phylum: Arthropoda
- Class: Insecta
- Order: Lepidoptera
- Family: Opostegidae
- Genus: Pseudopostega
- Species: P. spilodes

Binomial name
- Pseudopostega spilodes Meyrick, 1915

Synonyms
- Opostega spilodes Meyrick, 1915

Species of moth

Pseudopostega spilodes is a moth of the family Opostegidae. It was described by Edward Meyrick in 1915. It is known from Mysore, India.
