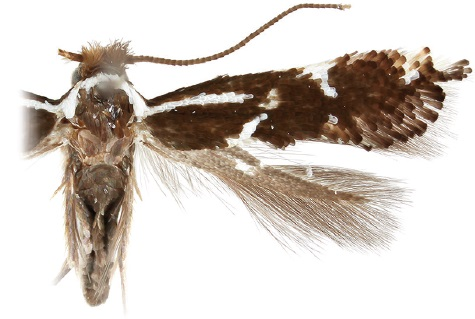

Scientific classification
- Kingdom: Animalia
- Phylum: Arthropoda
- Class: Insecta
- Order: Lepidoptera
- Family: Tineidae
- Genus: Philonome
- Species: P. nigrescens

Binomial name
- Philonome nigrescens Sohn & Davis, 2015

= Philonome nigrescens =

Species of moth

Philonome nigrescens is a species of moth of the family Tineidae. It is found in the south-western United States, where it has been recorded from Arizona and New Mexico.

The length of the forewings is 2.1–3.2 mm. The forewings are dark brown with a coppery luster. The longitudinal fascia is white and extends from the base to the basal one-third of the forewings. The costal fascia is white, straight and broadened at the costa and the dorsal bar is white. The subapical, apical and tornal spots are white. The hindwings are grey, but paler towards the base.

== Etymology ==
The species name refers to the black ground colour of the forewings and is derived from Latin nigrescere (meaning verging on black).
