= Dichomeris davisi =

Scientific classification
- Kingdom: Animalia
- Phylum: Arthropoda
- Class: Insecta
- Order: Lepidoptera
- Family: Gelechiidae
- Genus: Dichomeris
- Species: D. davisi

Binomial name
- Dichomeris davisi Park & Hodges, 1995

Species of moth

Dichomeris davisi is a moth in the family Gelechiidae. It was described by Kyu-Tek Park and Ronald W. Hodges in 1995. It is found in Taiwan, Sri Lanka, and Hong Kong (China).

The length of the forewings is 6.2–6.7 mm; the wingspan is 10–12 mm.

== Etymology ==
The species is named for Dr. Don R. Davis.
