= Pseudopostega robusta =

Scientific classification
- Kingdom: Animalia
- Phylum: Arthropoda
- Clade: Pancrustacea
- Class: Insecta
- Order: Lepidoptera
- Family: Opostegidae
- Genus: Pseudopostega
- Species: P. robusta

Binomial name
- Pseudopostega robusta A. Remeikis & J.R. Stonis, 2009

Species of moth

Pseudopostega robusta is a moth of the family Opostegidae. It was described by Andrius Remeikis and Jonas R. Stonis in 2009. It is known from the Pacific Coast of Costa Rica.

The wingspan is 5.9–6.2 mm for males. Adults have been recorded in March.

== Etymology ==
The species name is derived from the Latin robusta (meaning stout) in reference to the large and strongly thickened gnathos in the male genitalia.
