= Paralopostega peleana =

Scientific classification
- Domain: Eukaryota
- Kingdom: Animalia
- Phylum: Arthropoda
- Class: Insecta
- Order: Lepidoptera
- Family: Opostegidae
- Genus: Paralopostega
- Species: P. peleana

Binomial name
- Paralopostega peleana (Swezey, 1921)

Synonyms
- Opostega peleana Swezey, 1921

Species of moth

Paralopostega peleana is a moth of the family Opostegidae. It was first described by Otto Swezey in 1921. It is endemic to the Hawaiian islands of Oahu and possibly Kauai.

The larvae feed on Melicope species, including Melicope rotundifolia and Melicope sandwicensis. They mine the leaves of their host plant.
