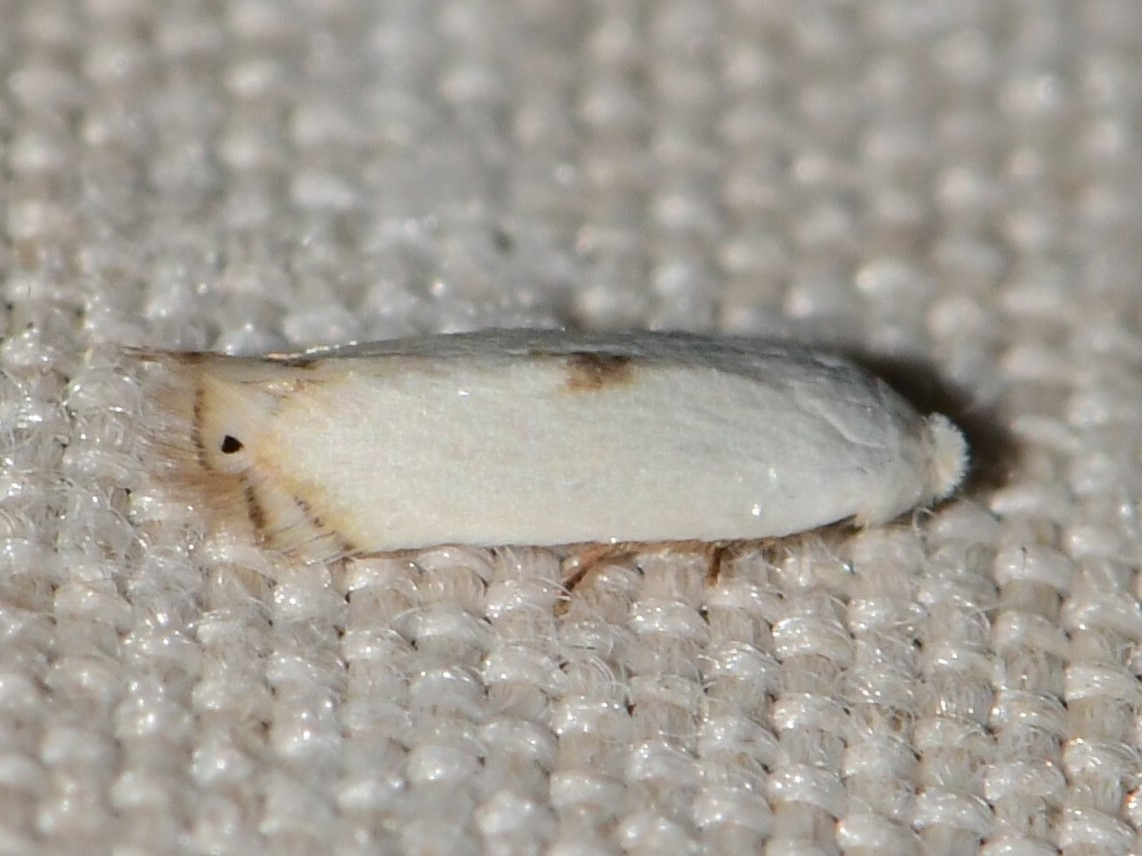

Scientific classification
- Kingdom: Animalia
- Phylum: Arthropoda
- Clade: Pancrustacea
- Class: Insecta
- Order: Lepidoptera
- Family: Opostegidae
- Genus: Pseudopostega
- Species: P. albogaleriella

Binomial name
- Pseudopostega albogaleriella (Clemens, 1862)

Synonyms
- List: Opostega albogaleriella Clemens, 1862; Opostega albogalleriella; Pseudopostega albogalleriella; Opostega napaeella Clemens, 1872; Opostega nonstrigella Chambers, 1881; Pseudopostega nonstrigella; Opostega bistrigulella Braun, 1918; Pseudopostega bistrigulella

= Pseudopostega albogaleriella =

Species of moth

Pseudopostega albogaleriella is a species of moth in the family Opostegidae. It is widely distributed through eastern North America from Nova Scotia to central Florida and south-eastern Texas and in the south-western United States through areas of California and Arizona.

The length of the forewings varies from 3 to 5.3 mm and occasionally even to 6 mm.
