= Eosopostega =

Scientific classification
- Kingdom: Animalia
- Phylum: Arthropoda
- Clade: Pancrustacea
- Class: Insecta
- Order: Lepidoptera
- Family: Opostegidae
- Subfamily: Opostegoidinae
- Genus: Eosopostega; D.R. Davis, 1988

Genus of moths

Eosopostega is a genus of moths of the family Opostegidae.

== Species ==
- Eosopostega armigera Puplesis & Robinson, 1999
- Eosopostega issikii D.R. Davis, 1988
