= Pseudopostega saltatrix =

Scientific classification
- Kingdom: Animalia
- Phylum: Arthropoda
- Class: Insecta
- Order: Lepidoptera
- Family: Opostegidae
- Genus: Pseudopostega
- Species: P. saltatrix

Binomial name
- Pseudopostega saltatrix (Walsingham, 1897)

Synonyms
- Opostega saltatrix Walsingham, 1897

Species of moth

Pseudopostega saltatrix is a moth of the family Opostegidae. It was described by Walsingham, Lord Thomas de Grey, in 1897. It was described from St. Thomas, in the Virgin Islands, but has an extremely wide range, from Cuba to Dominica in the West Indies, south from Belize to Ecuador, French Guiana and Paraguay.

The length of the forewings is 2.1–3.1 mm. In Costa Rica, adults have been collected throughout the year.
