= Pseudopostega pumila =

Scientific classification
- Kingdom: Animalia
- Phylum: Arthropoda
- Class: Insecta
- Order: Lepidoptera
- Family: Opostegidae
- Genus: Pseudopostega
- Species: P. pumila

Binomial name
- Pseudopostega pumila (Walsingham, 1914)

Synonyms
- Opostega pumila Walsingham, 1914

Species of moth

Pseudopostega pumila is a moth of the family Opostegidae. It was described by Walsingham, Lord Thomas de Grey, in 1914. It is known from Tabasco, Mexico.

The length of the forewings is about 3.2 mm. Adults have been recorded in March.
