= Pseudopostega velifera =

Scientific classification
- Kingdom: Animalia
- Phylum: Arthropoda
- Class: Insecta
- Order: Lepidoptera
- Family: Opostegidae
- Genus: Pseudopostega
- Species: P. velifera

Binomial name
- Pseudopostega velifera Meyrick, 1920

Synonyms
- Opostega velifera Meyrick, 1920

Species of moth

Pseudopostega velifera is a moth of the family Opostegidae. It was described by Edward Meyrick in 1920. It is known from Maharashtra, India.
