= Pseudopostega pontifex =

Scientific classification
- Kingdom: Animalia
- Phylum: Arthropoda
- Class: Insecta
- Order: Lepidoptera
- Family: Opostegidae
- Genus: Pseudopostega
- Species: P. pontifex

Binomial name
- Pseudopostega pontifex (Meyrick, 1915)

Synonyms
- Opostega pontifex Meyrick, 1915

Species of moth

Pseudopostega pontifex is a moth of the family Opostegidae. It was described by Edward Meyrick in 1915. It is known from Cali, Colombia.

The length of the forewings is about 2.7 mm. Adults have been recorded in May.
