= Pseudopostega subviolacea =

Scientific classification
- Kingdom: Animalia
- Phylum: Arthropoda
- Class: Insecta
- Order: Lepidoptera
- Family: Opostegidae
- Genus: Pseudopostega
- Species: P. subviolacea

Binomial name
- Pseudopostega subviolacea Meyrick, 1920

Synonyms
- Opostega subviolacea Meyrick, 1920

Species of moth

Pseudopostega subviolacea is a moth of the family Opostegidae. It was described by Edward Meyrick in 1920. It is known from Gujarat, India.
