= Pseudopostega protomochla =

Scientific classification
- Kingdom: Animalia
- Phylum: Arthropoda
- Class: Insecta
- Order: Lepidoptera
- Family: Opostegidae
- Genus: Pseudopostega
- Species: P. protomochla

Binomial name
- Pseudopostega protomochla (Meyrick, 1935)

Synonyms
- Opostega protomochla Meyrick, 1935

Species of moth

Pseudopostega protomochla is a moth of the family Opostegidae. It was described by Edward Meyrick in 1935. It is known from north-central Argentina and the state of Minas Gerais in southern Brazil.

The length of the forewings is 3.5–5 mm. Adults have been recorded from November to February in Argentina and in October in Brazil.
