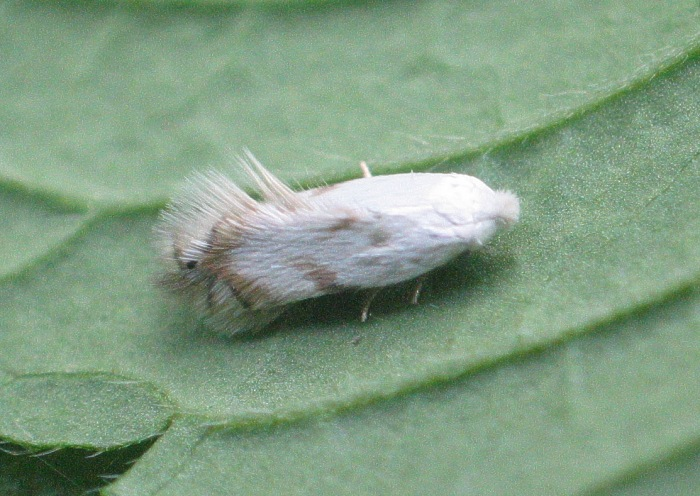

Scientific classification
- Kingdom: Animalia
- Phylum: Arthropoda
- Clade: Pancrustacea
- Class: Insecta
- Order: Lepidoptera
- Family: Opostegidae
- Genus: Pseudopostega
- Species: P. crepusculella

Binomial name
- Pseudopostega crepusculella (Zeller, 1839)

Synonyms
- Opostega crepusculella Zeller, 1839

= Pseudopostega crepusculella =

Species of moth

Pseudopostega crepusculella is a moth of the family Opostegidae. It is found in Europe.

The wingspan is 7–10.5 mm. A snow-white moth, the forewing has a V-shaped, light brown transverse band slightly outside the middle and two brown transverse bands at the tip, where there is also a small, black spot. The first joint of the antennae is greatly expanded and forms a white "eyelid" over the facets, otherwise the antennae are brownish and about 4/5 as long as the forewing. The head, forebody and forewing are white, the hind body greyish-brown, the hind wing light brown. Meyrick-The forewings are white with an oblique rather dark fuscous streak from middle of costa, and another from middle of dorsum. A fuscous ill-defined subapical fascia is followed by two darker costal strigulae and there is a minute black apical dot. Hindwings fuscous.

The moths fly from June to July depending on the location.

It is believed that the larvae feed on Mentha species.
