= Pseudopostega trinidadensis =

Scientific classification
- Kingdom: Animalia
- Phylum: Arthropoda
- Class: Insecta
- Order: Lepidoptera
- Family: Opostegidae
- Genus: Pseudopostega
- Species: P. trinidadensis

Binomial name
- Pseudopostega trinidadensis (Busck, 1910)

Synonyms
- Opostega trinidadensis Busck, 1910

Species of moth

Pseudopostega trinidadensis is a moth of the family Opostegidae. It was described by August Busck in 1910. As suggested by its specific epithet, it is known from Trinidad.

The length of the forewings is 4.3 to 4.8 millimetres (0.17 to 0.19 in). Adults have been recorded in June.
