= Neopostega =

Scientific classification
- Kingdom: Animalia
- Phylum: Arthropoda
- Clade: Pancrustacea
- Class: Insecta
- Order: Lepidoptera
- Family: Opostegidae
- Subfamily: Oposteginae
- Genus: Neopostega; D.R. Davis & J.R. Stonis, 2007

Type species
- Neopostega petila D.R. Davis & J.R. Stonis, 2007

Genus of moths

Neopostega is a genus of moths of the family Opostegidae.

== Species ==
- Neopostega asymmetra D.R. Davis & J.R. Stonis, 2007
- Neopostega distola D.R. Davis & J.R. Stonis, 2007
- Neopostega falcata D.R. Davis & J.R. Stonis, 2007
- Neopostega longispina D.R. Davis & J.R. Stonis, 2007
- Neopostega petila D.R. Davis & J.R. Stonis, 2007
