= Pseudopostega clastozona =

Scientific classification
- Kingdom: Animalia
- Phylum: Arthropoda
- Class: Insecta
- Order: Lepidoptera
- Family: Opostegidae
- Genus: Pseudopostega
- Species: P. clastozona

Binomial name
- Pseudopostega clastozona (Meyrick, 1913)

Synonyms
- Opostega clastozona Meyrick, 1913

Species of moth

Pseudopostega clastozona is a moth of the family Opostegidae. It was described by Edward Meyrick in 1913. It is known from the area of the former Transvaal Province, South Africa.

Adults have been recorded in December and January.
