= Pseudopostega pexa =

Scientific classification
- Kingdom: Animalia
- Phylum: Arthropoda
- Class: Insecta
- Order: Lepidoptera
- Family: Opostegidae
- Genus: Pseudopostega
- Species: P. pexa

Binomial name
- Pseudopostega pexa (Meyrick, 1920)

Synonyms
- Opostega pexa Meyrick, 1920

Species of moth

Pseudopostega pexa is a moth of the family Opostegidae. It is only known from north-eastern Brazil.

The length of the forewings is about 3.2 mm. Adults are mostly white. Adults have been collected in July.
