= Paralopostega =

Scientific classification
- Kingdom: Animalia
- Phylum: Arthropoda
- Clade: Pancrustacea
- Class: Insecta
- Order: Lepidoptera
- Family: Opostegidae
- Subfamily: Opostegoidinae
- Genus: Paralopostega; D.R. Davis, 1989

Type species
- Opostega callosa Swezey, 1921

Genus of moths

Paralopostega is a genus of moths of the family Opostegidae.

== Species ==
- Paralopostega callosa (Swezey, 1921)
- Paralopostega dives (Walsingham, 1907)
- Paralopostega filiforma (Swezey, 1921)
- Paralopostega maculata (Walsingham, 1907)
- Paralopostega peleana (Swezey, 1921)
- Paralopostega serpentina (Swezey, 1921)
