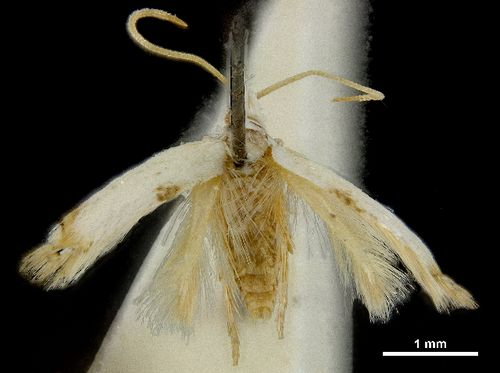

Scientific classification
- Kingdom: Animalia
- Phylum: Arthropoda
- Clade: Pancrustacea
- Class: Insecta
- Order: Lepidoptera
- Family: Opostegidae
- Genus: Pseudopostega
- Species: P. venticola

Binomial name
- Pseudopostega venticola (Walsingham, 1897)

Synonyms
- Opostega venticola Walsingham, 1897

= Pseudopostega venticola =

Species of moth

Pseudopostega venticola is a moth of the family Opostegidae. It was described by Walsingham, Lord Thomas de Grey, in 1897. It is known from much of the Neotropical Region from southern Florida and Texas, through much of the West Indies and Central America to southern Brazil.

The length of the forewings is 2.5–3.3 mm. Adults have been recorded in nearly every month.
