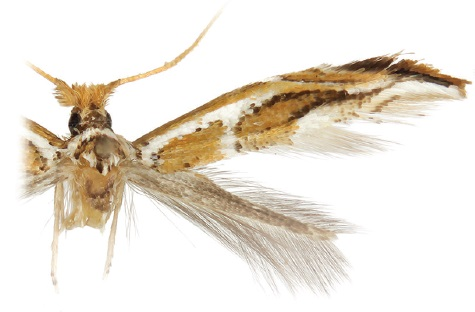

Scientific classification
- Kingdom: Animalia
- Phylum: Arthropoda
- Class: Insecta
- Order: Lepidoptera
- Family: Tineidae
- Genus: Philonome
- Species: P. lambdagrapha

Binomial name
- Philonome lambdagrapha Sohn, Davis & Lopez-Vaamonde, 2015

= Philonome lambdagrapha =

Species of moth

Philonome lambdagrapha is a species of moth of the family Tineidae. It is found in French Guiana.

The length of the forewings is about 3 mm. The forewings are reddish brown. The costa is black in the distal one-third, The longitudinal fascia extends to the apical streak. It is straight, white on the basal half and juxtaposed with a slender, intermittent black line along the lower border, which is sinuous and black on the distal half. The costal fasciae is slender and extends to the apex. The subapical streak is white and juxtaposed with a slender black line along the lower border and the apical streak is white and connected with the longitudinal fascia. The dorsal bar is white and juxtaposed with black along the outer border. The dorsal margin is sparsely irrorated with black scales on the basal one-sixths and at the middle. The tornal patch is elongate, white and juxtaposed with black along the upper border, irrorated with dark brown scales along the outer border. The marginal streak is dark brown. The hindwings are brownish grey.

== Etymology ==
The species name refers to the white fascia of the forewings (resembling a lambda) and is derived from the Greek letter lambda and a suffix derived from Greek graphein (meaning to write).
