= Paralopostega callosa =

Scientific classification
- Domain: Eukaryota
- Kingdom: Animalia
- Phylum: Arthropoda
- Class: Insecta
- Order: Lepidoptera
- Family: Opostegidae
- Genus: Paralopostega
- Species: P. callosa

Binomial name
- Paralopostega callosa (Swezey, 1921)

Synonyms
- Opostega callosa Swezey, 1921

Species of moth

Paralopostega callosa is a moth of the family Opostegidae. It was first described by Otto Swezey in 1921. It is endemic to the Hawaiian island of Oahu, where it is thought to be widespread in the Koʻolau Range.
