= Pseudopostega bellicosa =

Scientific classification
- Kingdom: Animalia
- Phylum: Arthropoda
- Class: Insecta
- Order: Lepidoptera
- Family: Opostegidae
- Genus: Pseudopostega
- Species: P. bellicosa

Binomial name
- Pseudopostega bellicosa (Meyrick, 1911)

Synonyms
- Opostega bellicosa Meyrick, 1911

Species of moth

Pseudopostega bellicosa is a moth of the family Opostegidae. It was described by Edward Meyrick in 1911. It is known from the area of the former Transvaal Province, South Africa.

Adults have been recorded in October.
