= Pseudopostega epactaea =

Scientific classification
- Kingdom: Animalia
- Phylum: Arthropoda
- Class: Insecta
- Order: Lepidoptera
- Family: Opostegidae
- Genus: Pseudopostega
- Species: P. epactaea

Binomial name
- Pseudopostega epactaea Meyrick, 1907

Synonyms
- Opostega epactaea Meyrick, 1907

Species of moth

Pseudopostega epactaea is a moth of the family Opostegidae. It was described by Edward Meyrick in 1907. It is known from Sri Lanka.

Adults have been recorded in February and March.
