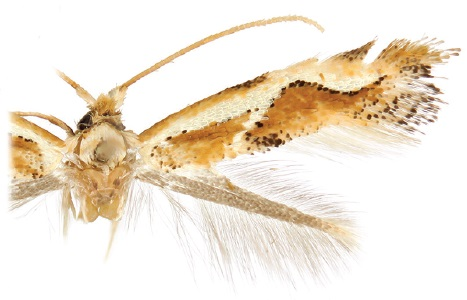

Scientific classification
- Kingdom: Animalia
- Phylum: Arthropoda
- Class: Insecta
- Order: Lepidoptera
- Family: Tineidae
- Genus: Philonome
- Species: P. curvilineata

Binomial name
- Philonome curvilineata Sohn, Davis & Lopez-Vaamonde, 2015

= Philonome curvilineata =

Species of moth

Philonome curvilineata is a species of moth of the family Tineidae. It is found in French Guiana.

The length of the forewings is about 2.8 mm. The forewings are reddish brown, slightly paler along the dorsal area. The costal area is yellowish brown on the basal half, brownish white above the curvature of longitudinal fascia, pale orange on the distal fourth, intermixed with black scales on the middle and distal fourth of the costa. The longitudinal fascia is continuous to near the apex and convex at the distal third where it is white and juxtaposed with a slender black line along the lower border. The dorsal bar is straight, white and juxtaposed with a slender, intermittent, black line along the outer border. There is black irroration at the middle of the dorsal margin and on the tornal area. The hindwings are brownish grey.

== Etymology ==
The species name refers to the curved longitudinal fascia on the forewings and is derived from Latin curvus (meaning curved) and lineatus (meaning line).
