= Paralopostega serpentina =

Scientific classification
- Domain: Eukaryota
- Kingdom: Animalia
- Phylum: Arthropoda
- Class: Insecta
- Order: Lepidoptera
- Family: Opostegidae
- Genus: Paralopostega
- Species: P. serpentina

Binomial name
- Paralopostega serpentina (Swezey, 1921)

Synonyms
- Opostega serpentina Swezey, 1921

Species of moth

Paralopostega serpentina is a moth of the family Opostegidae. It was first described by Otto Swezey in 1921. It is endemic to the Hawaiian islands of Oahu and possibly Kauai.

The larvae feed on Melicope species, including Melicope elliptica, Melicope clusiaefolia and Melicope sapotaefolia. They mine the leaves of their host plant.
