= Pseudopostega brevicaudata =

Scientific classification
- Kingdom: Animalia
- Phylum: Arthropoda
- Clade: Pancrustacea
- Class: Insecta
- Order: Lepidoptera
- Family: Opostegidae
- Genus: Pseudopostega
- Species: P. brevicaudata

Binomial name
- Pseudopostega brevicaudata Stonis, Remeikis and Sruoga, 2013

Species of moth

Pseudopostega brevicaudata is a moth of the family Opostegidae. It is found in the Himalayas.
