= Pseudopostega frigida =

Scientific classification
- Kingdom: Animalia
- Phylum: Arthropoda
- Class: Insecta
- Order: Lepidoptera
- Family: Opostegidae
- Genus: Pseudopostega
- Species: P. frigida

Binomial name
- Pseudopostega frigida Meyrick, 1906

Synonyms
- Opostega frigida Meyrick, 1906

Species of moth

Pseudopostega frigida is a moth of the family Opostegidae. It was described by Edward Meyrick in 1906. It is known from Sri Lanka.

Adults have been recorded in February.
