= Pseudopostega similantis =

Scientific classification
- Kingdom: Animalia
- Phylum: Arthropoda
- Class: Insecta
- Order: Lepidoptera
- Family: Opostegidae
- Genus: Pseudopostega
- Species: P. similantis

Binomial name
- Pseudopostega similantis Puplesis & Robinson, 1999

Species of moth

Pseudopostega similantis is a species of moth of the family Opostegidae. It was described by Puplesis and Robinson in 1999. It is known only from central Sumba in Indonesia.
