= Pseudopostega abrupta =

Scientific classification
- Kingdom: Animalia
- Phylum: Arthropoda
- Class: Insecta
- Order: Lepidoptera
- Family: Opostegidae
- Genus: Pseudopostega
- Species: P. abrupta

Binomial name
- Pseudopostega abrupta (Walsingham, 1897)

Synonyms
- Opostega abrupta Walsingham, 1897

Species of moth

Pseudopostega abrupta is a moth of the family Opostegidae. It is endemic to the West Indies, where it has been found on Guana Island and St. Thomas.

The length of the forewings is 2.5–3 mm. Adults are mostly white. Adults have been collected in March, July, October and November.
