= Pseudopostega elachista =

Scientific classification
- Kingdom: Animalia
- Phylum: Arthropoda
- Class: Insecta
- Order: Lepidoptera
- Family: Opostegidae
- Genus: Pseudopostega
- Species: P. elachista

Binomial name
- Pseudopostega elachista (Walsingham, 1914)

Synonyms
- Opostega elachista Walsingham, 1914

Species of moth

Pseudopostega elachista is a moth of the family Opostegidae. It was described by Walsingham, Lord Thomas de Grey, in 1914. It is known from Guerrero, Mexico.

The length of the forewings is about 4.4 mm (0.17 in). Adults have been recorded in September.
