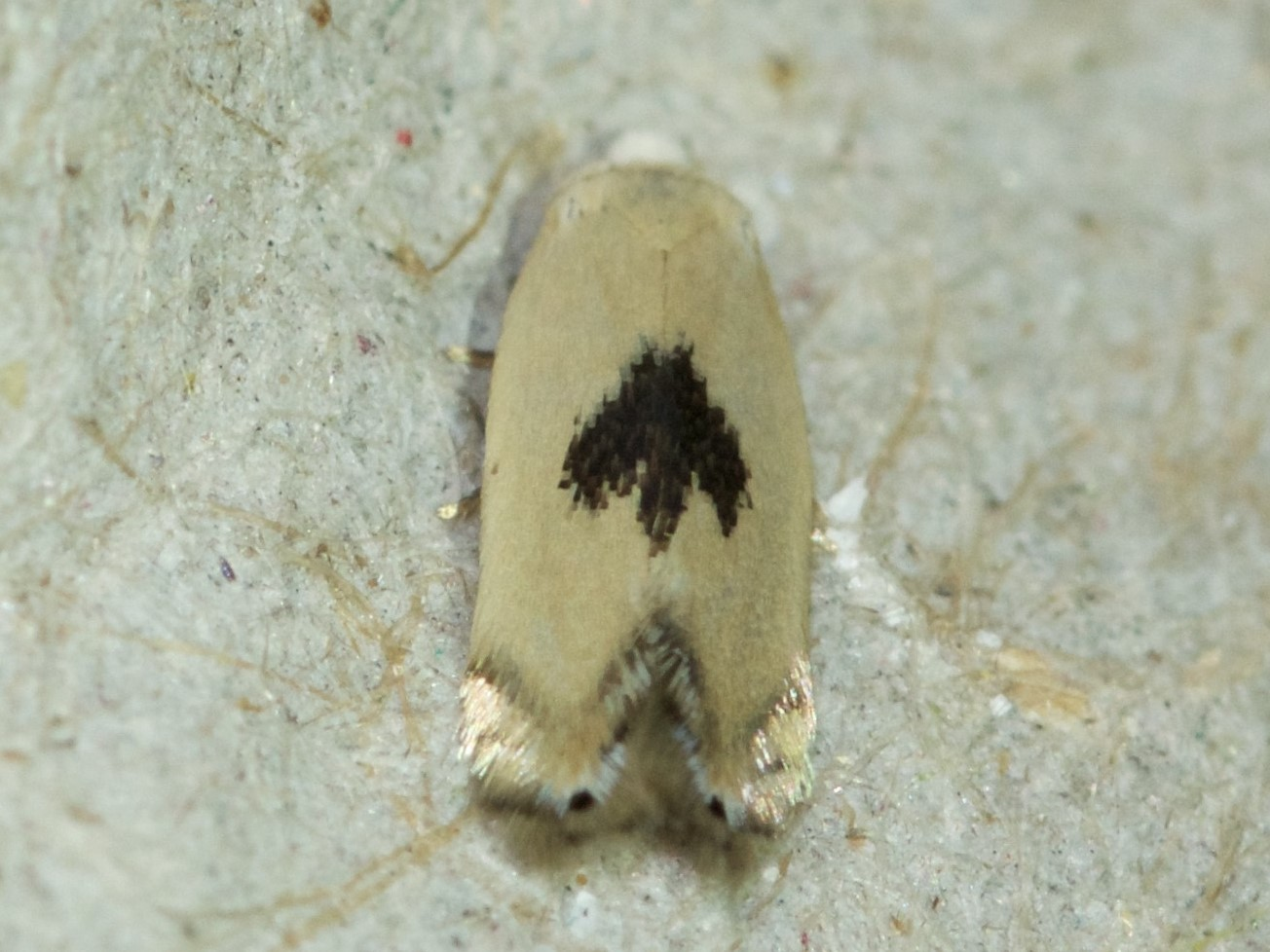

Scientific classification
- Kingdom: Animalia
- Phylum: Arthropoda
- Class: Insecta
- Order: Lepidoptera
- Family: Opostegidae
- Genus: Pseudopostega
- Species: P. cretea

Binomial name
- Pseudopostega cretea (Meyrick, 1920)

Synonyms
- Opostega cretea Meyrick, 1920

= Pseudopostega cretea =

Species of moth

Pseudopostega cretea is a species of moth in the family Opostegidae. It was first described by Edward Meyrick in 1920. It is known from the eastern half of North America from southern Canada (including Ontario) south to northern Florida, west to south-eastern British Columbia and Texas.

The length of the forewings is 3.9–4.6 mm. Adults have been recorded from May to July (with one early August record) in the southern United States and from June to August across the northern part of its broad range.

The Moth has been observed in a variety of habitats from deciduous forest to open sand savanna.
