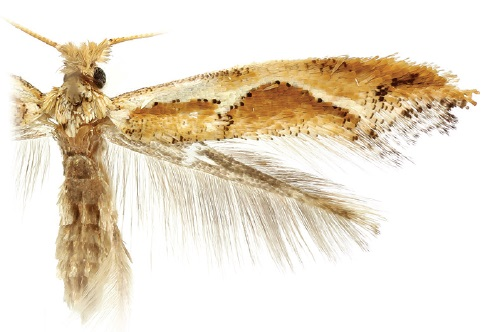

Scientific classification
- Kingdom: Animalia
- Phylum: Arthropoda
- Class: Insecta
- Order: Lepidoptera
- Family: Tineidae
- Genus: Philonome
- Species: P. kawakitai

Binomial name
- Philonome kawakitai Sohn, Davis & Lopez-Vaamonde, 2015

= Philonome kawakitai =

Species of moth

Philonome kawakitai is a species of moth of the family Tineidae first described by Jae-Cheon Sohn, Donald Davis and Carlos Lopez-Vaamonde in 2015. It is found in French Guiana.

The length of the forewings is about 3.8 mm. The forewings are reddish brown, but paler along the dorsal area and the costal area is pale orange, intermixed with dark brown scales, densely on the basal third and sparsely on the distal third. The longitudinal fascia is continuous to near the termen, convex and narrowed at the distal third, white and juxtaposed with a slender black line along the lower border. The dorsal bar has the form of a triangular patch on the anterior half, combined to a longitudinal fascia and as a slender, intermittent, black line on the posterior half. The subterminal line is connected to the distal one-eighths of the costa and tornus. The hindwings are dark brownish grey.

== Etymology ==
The species is named for Atsushi Kawakita, who collected the holotype.
