= Pseudopostega congruens =

Scientific classification
- Kingdom: Animalia
- Phylum: Arthropoda
- Class: Insecta
- Order: Lepidoptera
- Family: Opostegidae
- Genus: Pseudopostega
- Species: P. congruens

Binomial name
- Pseudopostega congruens (Walsingham, 1914)

Synonyms
- Opostega congruens Walsingham, 1914

Species of moth

Pseudopostega congruens is a moth of the family Opostegidae. It was described by Walsingham, Lord Thomas de Grey, in 1914. It is known from Guerrero, Mexico.

The length of the forewings is about 4.4 mm. Adults have been recorded in August.
