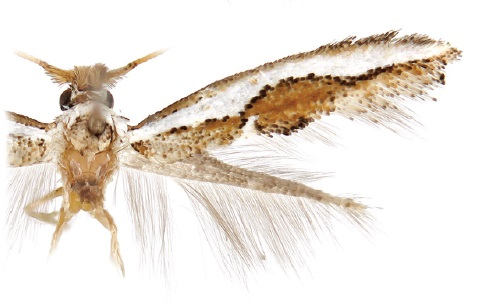

Scientific classification
- Kingdom: Animalia
- Phylum: Arthropoda
- Class: Insecta
- Order: Lepidoptera
- Family: Tineidae
- Genus: Philonome
- Species: P. albivittata

Binomial name
- Philonome albivittata Sohn, Davis & Lopez-Vaamonde, 2015

= Philonome albivittata =

Species of moth

Philonome albivittata is a species of moth from the Tineidae family found in French Guiana.

The length of the forewings is 2.8–3.1 mm. The forewings are reddish brown with a brown costa. The longitudinal fascia is white, spanning the entire costal area except the costa. It has a sinuous lower margin and is accompanied with a narrow, dark brown line. The dorsal bar is white and found at the basal third of the dorsum. It is dentiform and accompanied with a dark brown bar along the upper margin. The marginal area is dark brown. The hindwings are brownish grey.

== Etymology ==
The species name refers to the white longitudinal band on the forewings and is derived from Latin albus (meaning white) and vittatus (meaning banded).
