= Pseudopostega kempella =

Scientific classification
- Kingdom: Animalia
- Phylum: Arthropoda
- Class: Insecta
- Order: Lepidoptera
- Family: Opostegidae
- Genus: Pseudopostega
- Species: P. kempella

Binomial name
- Pseudopostega kempella (Eyer, 1967)

Synonyms
- Opostega kempella Eyer, 1967

Species of moth

Pseudopostega kempella is a small, white moth of the family Opostegidae. The top of its forewings are each marked with a small, brown spot. It known only from the type locality of Key Largo in southern Florida.

The length of the forewings is 1.8–2.5 mm. Adults are on wing in October and November.
