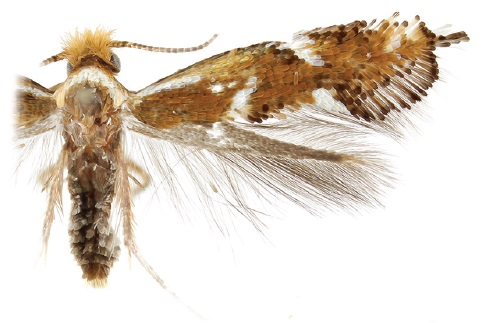

Scientific classification
- Kingdom: Animalia
- Phylum: Arthropoda
- Class: Insecta
- Order: Lepidoptera
- Family: Tineidae
- Genus: Philonome
- Species: P. wielgusi

Binomial name
- Philonome wielgusi Sohn & Davis, 2015

= Philonome wielgusi =

Species of moth

Philonome wielgusi is a species of moth of the family Tineidae. It is found in the south-western United States, where it has been recorded from Arizona.

The length of the forewings is 2.3–3 mm. The forewings are brown, the dorsum dark brownish grey basally. The longitudinal fascia is white, extending from the base to the basal one-third of the forewing. The costal fascia is white and found at the distal two-fifths of the costa. It is oblique and adjacent to a slender dark brown line on the anterior side. The subapical and apical spots are white and the tornal patch is white and triangular. The dorsal bar is white and oblique. The hindwings are grey.

== Etymology ==
The species is named in honour of Mr. Ronald S. Wielgus, who collected nearly the entire type series.
