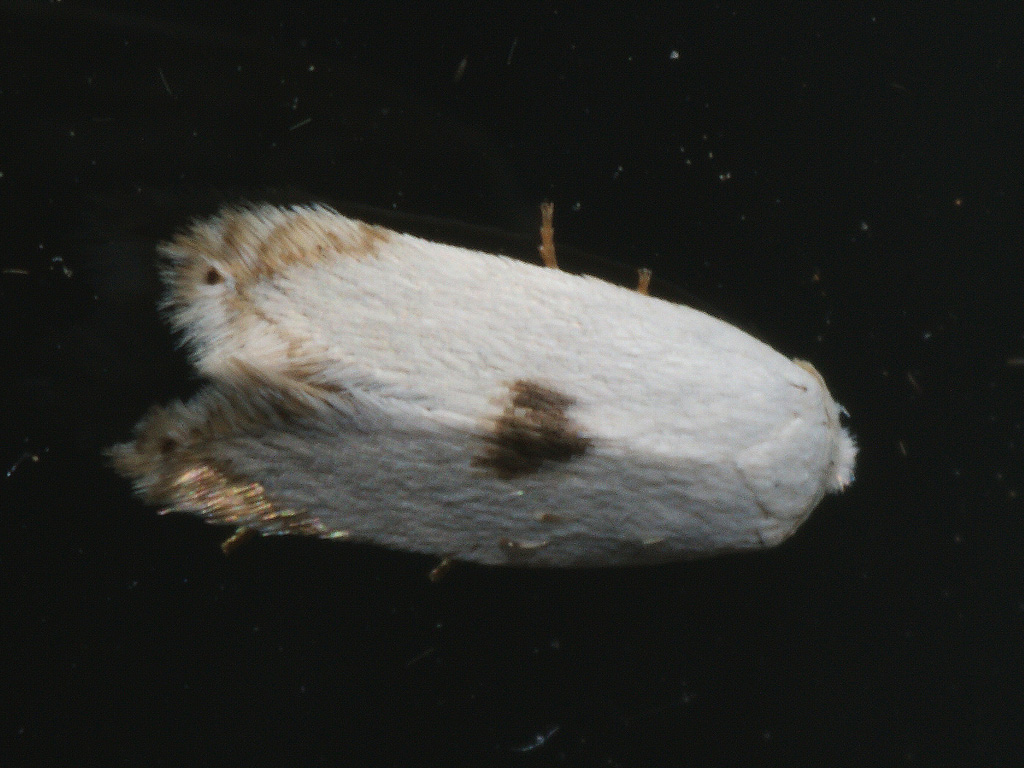

Scientific classification
- Kingdom: Animalia
- Phylum: Arthropoda
- Clade: Pancrustacea
- Class: Insecta
- Order: Lepidoptera
- Family: Opostegidae
- Genus: Pseudopostega
- Species: P. auritella

Binomial name
- Pseudopostega auritella (Hübner, 1813)

Synonyms
- Tinea auritella Hübner, 1813

= Pseudopostega auritella =

Species of moth

Pseudopostega auritella is a moth of the family Opostegidae. It is known from most of Europe, from Great Britain and France, east to Ukraine and Russia and from Sweden and Finland, south to Switzerland and Romania. It is also found in the eastern part of the Palearctic realm.

The wingspan is 9–12 mm. Adults are on wing from June to July.

The larvae are known to feed on Lycopus europaeus. They mine the stems of their host plant. The mine has the form of a long (about 20 cm), inconspicuous gallery.
