= Notiopostega =

Scientific classification
- Kingdom: Animalia
- Phylum: Arthropoda
- Clade: Pancrustacea
- Class: Insecta
- Order: Lepidoptera
- Family: Opostegidae
- Subfamily: Opostegoidinae
- Genus: Notiopostega; D. R. Davis, 1989
- Species: N. atrata

Binomial name
- Notiopostega atrata D. R. Davis, 1989

Genus of moths

Notiopostega is a genus of moths of the Opostegidae family. It contains only one species Notiopostega atrata which is known only from the coastal hills of the Valdivia Province in Chile.

The length of the forewings is 5–6 mm for males and 6.4-8.3 mm for females. Adults are on wing from late August to early October in one generation. They fly during the day in the early spring.
