= Pseudopostega mexicana =

Scientific classification
- Kingdom: Animalia
- Phylum: Arthropoda
- Clade: Pancrustacea
- Class: Insecta
- Order: Lepidoptera
- Family: Opostegidae
- Genus: Pseudopostega
- Species: P. mexicana

Binomial name
- Pseudopostega mexicana A. Remeikis & J.R. Stonis, 2009

Species of moth

Pseudopostega mexicana is a moth of the family Opostegidae. It was described by Andrius Remeikis and Jonas R. Stonis in 2009. It is known from the Pacific Coast of Mexico.

The wingspan is 4–4.3 mm for males. Adults have been recorded in November.

== Etymology ==
The species name refers to the country from which the type series originated.
