= Pseudopostega microlepta =

Scientific classification
- Kingdom: Animalia
- Phylum: Arthropoda
- Class: Insecta
- Order: Lepidoptera
- Family: Opostegidae
- Genus: Pseudopostega
- Species: P. microlepta

Binomial name
- Pseudopostega microlepta (Meyrick, 1915)

Synonyms
- Opostega microlepta Meyrick, 1915

Species of moth

Pseudopostega microlepta is a moth of the family Opostegidae. It is known from western Ecuador and lowland, north-eastern Guyana.

The length of the forewings is about 2.2 mm.
