= Pseudopostega strigulata =

Scientific classification
- Kingdom: Animalia
- Phylum: Arthropoda
- Class: Insecta
- Order: Lepidoptera
- Family: Opostegidae
- Genus: Pseudopostega
- Species: P. strigulata

Binomial name
- Pseudopostega strigulata Puplesis & Robinson, 1999

Species of moth

Pseudopostega strigulata is a species of moth of the family Opostegidae. It was first described by Puplesis and Robinson in 1999. It is exclusively native to Assam, in India.
