= Pseudopostega euryntis =

Scientific classification
- Kingdom: Animalia
- Phylum: Arthropoda
- Class: Insecta
- Order: Lepidoptera
- Family: Opostegidae
- Genus: Pseudopostega
- Species: P. euryntis

Binomial name
- Pseudopostega euryntis (Meyrick, 1907)

Synonyms
- Opostega euryntis Meyrick, 1907

Species of moth

Pseudopostega euryntis is a moth of the family Opostegidae. It was described by Edward Meyrick in 1907. It is known from Mysore, India, as well as Sri Lanka.

Adults have been recorded in June.
