= Paralopostega filiforma =

Scientific classification
- Domain: Eukaryota
- Kingdom: Animalia
- Phylum: Arthropoda
- Class: Insecta
- Order: Lepidoptera
- Family: Opostegidae
- Genus: Paralopostega
- Species: P. filiforma

Binomial name
- Paralopostega filiforma (Swezey, 1921)

Synonyms
- Opostega filiforma Swezey, 1921

Species of moth

Paralopostega filiforma is a moth of the family Opostegidae. It was first described by Otto Swezey in 1921. It is endemic to the Hawaiian island of Oahu.

The larvae feed on Melicope clusiaefolia, Melicope elliptica and Melicope sapotaefolia. They mine the leaves of their host plant.
