= Paralopostega dives =

Scientific classification
- Domain: Eukaryota
- Kingdom: Animalia
- Phylum: Arthropoda
- Class: Insecta
- Order: Lepidoptera
- Family: Opostegidae
- Genus: Paralopostega
- Species: P. dives

Binomial name
- Paralopostega dives (Walsingham, 1907)

Synonyms
- Opostega dives Walsingham, 1907

Species of moth

Paralopostega dives is a moth of the family Opostegidae. It was first described by Lord Walsingham in 1907. It is endemic to the Hawaiian island of Kauai.

The larvae feed on Melicope species (M. anisata, M. kauaiensis and M. gayana). They probably mine the leaves of their host plant.
