= Pseudopostega machaerias =

Scientific classification
- Kingdom: Animalia
- Phylum: Arthropoda
- Class: Insecta
- Order: Lepidoptera
- Family: Opostegidae
- Genus: Pseudopostega
- Species: P. machaerias

Binomial name
- Pseudopostega machaerias Meyrick, 1907

Synonyms
- Opostega machaerias Meyrick, 1907

Species of moth

Pseudopostega machaerias is a moth of the family Opostegidae. It was described by Edward Meyrick in 1907. It is known from Maskeliya, Sri Lanka.
