= Pseudopostega latiplana =

Scientific classification
- Kingdom: Animalia
- Phylum: Arthropoda
- Clade: Pancrustacea
- Class: Insecta
- Order: Lepidoptera
- Family: Opostegidae
- Genus: Pseudopostega
- Species: P. latiplana

Binomial name
- Pseudopostega latiplana A. Remeikis & J.R. Stonis, 2009

Species of moth

Pseudopostega latiplana is a moth of the family Opostegidae. It was described by Andrius Remeikis and Jonas R. Stonis in 2009. It is known from the Pacific Coast of Mexico.
