= Pseudopostega perdigna =

Scientific classification
- Kingdom: Animalia
- Phylum: Arthropoda
- Class: Insecta
- Order: Lepidoptera
- Family: Opostegidae
- Genus: Pseudopostega
- Species: P. perdigna

Binomial name
- Pseudopostega perdigna (Walsingham, 1914)

Synonyms
- Opostega perdigna Walsingham, 1914

Species of moth

Pseudopostega perdigna is a moth of the family Opostegidae. It was described by Walsingham, Lord Thomas de Grey, in 1914. It is known from Guerrero, Mexico.

The length of the forewings is about 6 mm. Adults have been recorded in July.
