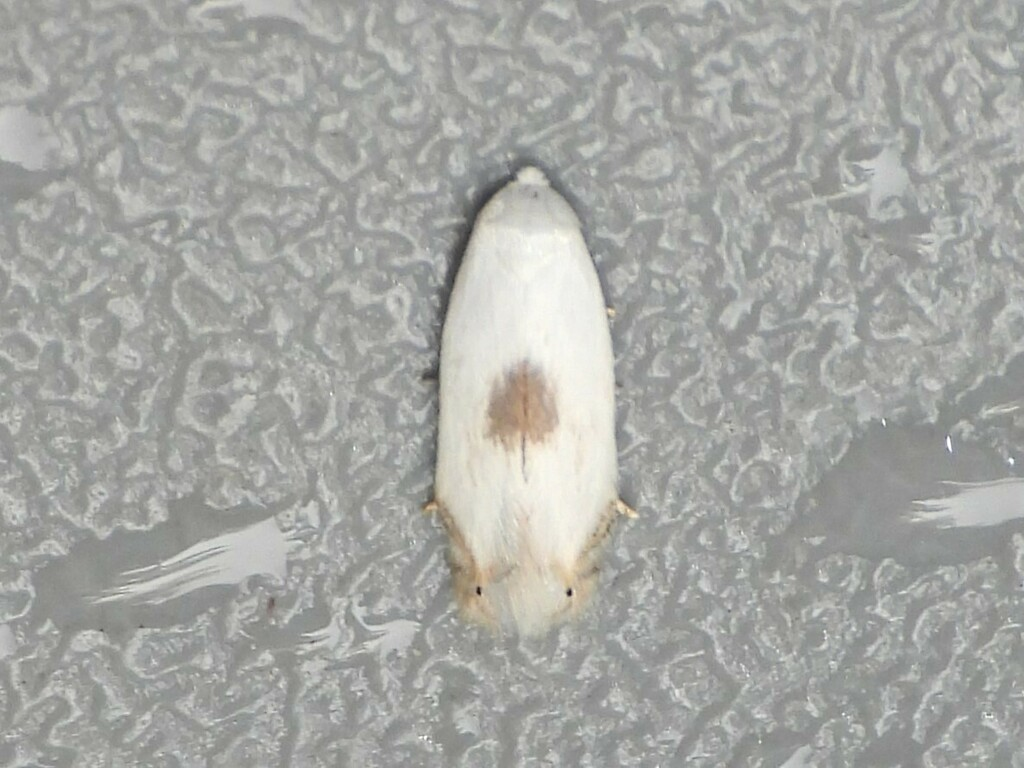

Scientific classification
- Kingdom: Animalia
- Phylum: Arthropoda
- Clade: Pancrustacea
- Class: Insecta
- Order: Lepidoptera
- Family: Opostegidae
- Genus: Pseudopostega
- Species: P. quadristrigella

Binomial name
- Pseudopostega quadristrigella (Frey and Boll, 1876)

Synonyms
- Opostega quadristrigella Chambers, 1875; Opostega accessoriella Frey and Boll, 1876; Pseudopostega accessoriella

= Pseudopostega quadristrigella =

Species of moth

Pseudopostega quadristrigella is a moth of the family Opostegidae. It was described by Frey and Boll in 1876. It is known from Maine west to South Dakota and south to Texas.

The length of the forewings is 4.4–5.2 mm. Adults have been recorded from May to August.
