= Eosopostega armigera =

Scientific classification
- Domain: Eukaryota
- Kingdom: Animalia
- Phylum: Arthropoda
- Class: Insecta
- Order: Lepidoptera
- Family: Opostegidae
- Genus: Eosopostega
- Species: E. armigera

Binomial name
- Eosopostega armigera Puplesis & Robinson, 1999

Species of moth

Eosopostega armigera is a species of moth of the family Opostegidae. It was described by Puplesis and Robinson in 1999. It is known only from the Moluccas in Indonesia.
