= Pseudopostega adusta =

Scientific classification
- Kingdom: Animalia
- Phylum: Arthropoda
- Class: Insecta
- Order: Lepidoptera
- Family: Opostegidae
- Genus: Pseudopostega
- Species: P. adusta

Binomial name
- Pseudopostega adusta (Walsingham, 1897)

Synonyms
- Opostega adusta Walsingham, 1897

Species of moth

Pseudopostega adusta is a moth of the family Opostegidae. It was described by Walsingham, Lord Thomas de Grey, in 1897. It is known from the West Indies, from Cuba east to Dominica, south to Belize and Ecuador. It is also known from Costa Rica.

The length of the forewings is 2.1–2.8 mm. Adults have been recorded in January, March to April and June.
