= Pseudopostega sacculata =

Scientific classification
- Kingdom: Animalia
- Phylum: Arthropoda
- Class: Insecta
- Order: Lepidoptera
- Family: Opostegidae
- Genus: Pseudopostega
- Species: P. sacculata

Binomial name
- Pseudopostega sacculata (Meyrick, 1915)

Synonyms
- Opostega sacculata Meyrick, 1915

Species of moth

Pseudopostega sacculata is a moth of the family Opostegidae. It known only from south-western Ecuador.

The length of the forewings is about 2.6 mm. Adults are on wing in January and June.
