= Pseudopostega zelopa =

Scientific classification
- Kingdom: Animalia
- Phylum: Arthropoda
- Class: Insecta
- Order: Lepidoptera
- Family: Opostegidae
- Genus: Pseudopostega
- Species: P. zelopa

Binomial name
- Pseudopostega zelopa Meyrick, 1905

Synonyms
- Opostega zelopa Meyrick, 1905

Species of moth

Pseudopostega zelopa is a moth of the family Opostegidae. It was described by Edward Meyrick in 1905. It is known from Pundalu-oya, Sri Lanka.
