= Pseudopostega paromias =

Scientific classification
- Kingdom: Animalia
- Phylum: Arthropoda
- Class: Insecta
- Order: Lepidoptera
- Family: Opostegidae
- Genus: Pseudopostega
- Species: P. paromias

Binomial name
- Pseudopostega paromias (Meyrick, 1915)

Synonyms
- Opostega paromias Meyrick, 1915

Species of moth

Pseudopostega paromias is a moth of the family Opostegidae. It was described by Edward Meyrick in 1915. It is known from Matucana, Peru.

The length of the forewings is about 4 mm. Adults have been recorded in July.
