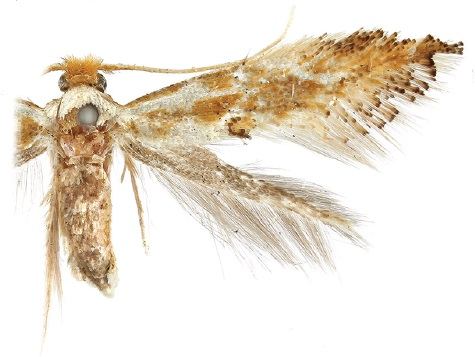
- Philonome clemensella

Scientific classification
- Kingdom: Animalia
- Phylum: Arthropoda
- Clade: Pancrustacea
- Class: Insecta
- Order: Lepidoptera
- Family: Tineidae
- Genus: Philonome; Chambers, 1874

Synonyms
- Phillonome Chambers, 1880; Phyllonome Chambers, 1882

= Philonome =

Genus of moths

Philonome is a genus of moths in the family Tineidae.

== Species ==
- Philonome albivittata Sohn & Davis, 2015
- Philonome clemensella Chambers, 1874
- Philonome cuprescens Walsingham, 1914
- Philonome curvilineata Sohn & Davis, 2015
- Philonome euryarga Meyrick, 1915
- Philonome kawakitai Sohn & Davis, 2015
- Philonome lambdagrapha Sohn & Davis, 2015
- Philonome nigrescens Sohn & Davis, 2015
- Philonome penerivifera Sohn & Davis, 2015
- Philonome rivifera Meyrick, 1915
- Philonome spectata Meyrick, 1920
- Philonome wielgusi Sohn & Davis, 2015

== Former species ==
- Philonome albella (Chambers, 1877)
- Philonome luteella (Chambers, 1875)

== Taxonomy ==
The genus was previously placed in Lyonetiidae or Bucculatricidae.
