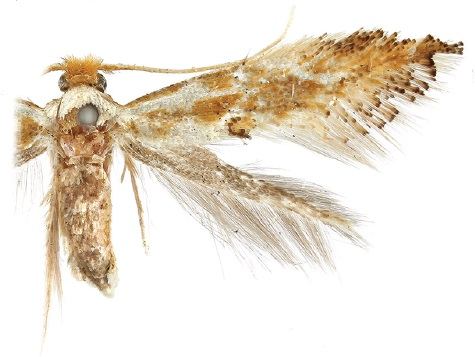

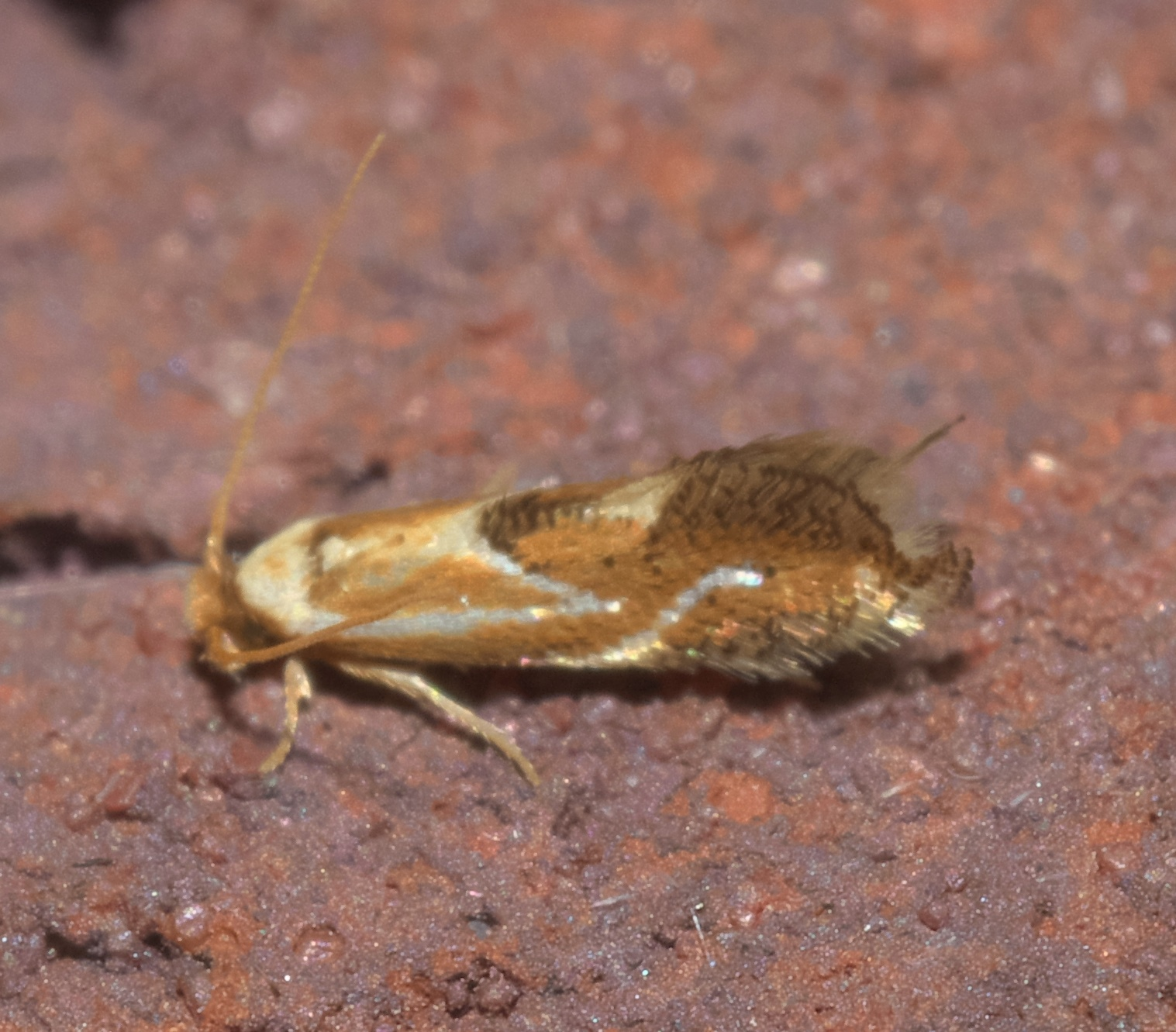

Scientific classification
- Kingdom: Animalia
- Phylum: Arthropoda
- Clade: Pancrustacea
- Class: Insecta
- Order: Lepidoptera
- Family: Tineidae
- Genus: Philonome
- Species: P. clemensella

Binomial name
- Philonome clemensella Chambers, 1874

Synonyms
- Philonome staintonella Chambers, 1876 (Nomen nudum)

= Philonome clemensella =

Species of moth

Philonome clemensella is a species of moth of the family Tineidae found in North America.

== Description ==
The length of the forewings is 2.8–4.4 mm. The wings are narrow and typically folded around the abdomen at rest. The forewing has an orange-brown ground color. A diagonal, white median line stops short of the costa and turns parallel to the costa to meet the white thorax. A diagonal, white postmedial line begins wide at the costa and narrows and stops before reaching the curved outer margin. Black scales appear in several small clumps: posterior to the thorax, in a tuft near the median line, at the inner end of the postmedial line, and along the outer margin.

== Taxonomy ==
The species has been classified in the leaf-miner moth family Lyonetiidae in the past. A genetics study published in 2013 showed that the species belongs in the family Tineidae of clothes moths.

== Range ==
The species' occurrence range extends from Oklahoma and Minnesota in the west to Florida and Maine in the east, including southeastern Canada.

== Life cycle ==
Previous accounts have reported that P. clemensella have been collected from hickory and linden trees, however recent review indicates: "these were based on the ambiguous label data of specimens from the United States National Museum of Natural History. No additional observation of the larvae of P. clemensella has been reported from these trees." Adults have been reported from April to November, with most sightings in June and July.
