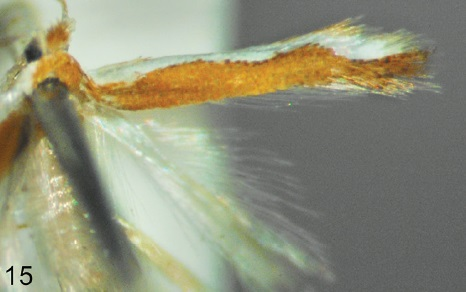

Scientific classification
- Kingdom: Animalia
- Phylum: Arthropoda
- Class: Insecta
- Order: Lepidoptera
- Family: Tineidae
- Genus: Philonome
- Species: P. spectata

Binomial name
- Philonome spectata Meyrick, 1920

= Philonome spectata =

Species of moth

Philonome spectata is a species of moth of the family Tineidae. It is found in Brazil (Pará).

The length of the forewings is about 2.3 mm. The forewings are reddish brown. The longitudinal fascia is white, covering most of the costal area. The lower margin is sinuous and accompanied with a very narrow dark brown line. The costa is suffused with pale orange subbasally and in the terminal third. The hindwings are lustrous, yellowish grey, but paler towards the base.
