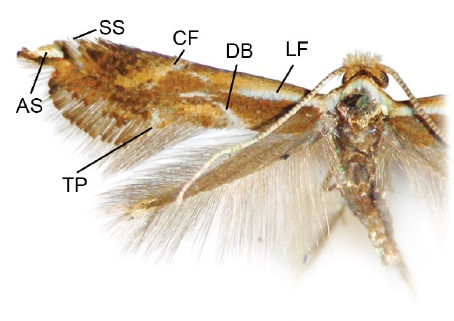

Scientific classification
- Kingdom: Animalia
- Phylum: Arthropoda
- Class: Insecta
- Order: Lepidoptera
- Family: Tineidae
- Genus: Philonome
- Species: P. cuprescens

Binomial name
- Philonome cuprescens Walsingham, 1914

= Philonome cuprescens =

Species of moth

Philonome cuprescens is a species of moth of the family Tineidae. It is found in Mexico (Guerrero).

The length of the forewings is 2.8–3.9 mm. The forewings are brown, intermixed with dark brown scales in the postmedian area. The longitudinal fascia is white, closer to the costa than to the dorsum and accompanied with yellowish brown fascia anteriorly. The costal fascia is yellowish brown, curved to the apex at the middle and accompanied with a narrow, white line along the lower margin in the costal half. The dorsal bar is white, curved in the terminal fourth and accompanied with yellowish brown spreading in the dorsal area, almost connected with the longitudinal fascia. The subapical spot is white, narrow and curved and the apical spot is white and suffused with reddish brown costally. The tornal patch is very small. The hindwings are dark greyish brown.
