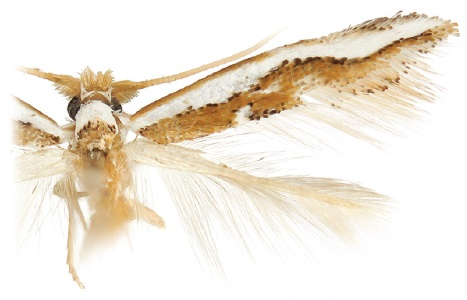

Scientific classification
- Kingdom: Animalia
- Phylum: Arthropoda
- Class: Insecta
- Order: Lepidoptera
- Family: Tineidae
- Genus: Philonome
- Species: P. euryarga

Binomial name
- Philonome euryarga Meyrick, 1915

= Philonome euryarga =

Species of moth

Philonome euryarga is a species of moth of the family Tineidae. It is found in Guyana and French Guiana.

The length of the forewings is about 2.7 mm. The forewings are reddish brown with a brown costa. The longitudinal fascia is white, spanning the entire costal area except the costa. The lower margin is sinuous, accompanied with a narrow, dark brown line. The dorsal bar is white and found at the basal third of the dorsum. It is dentiform and accompanied with a dark brown bar along the upper margin. The marginal area is dark brown. The hindwings are pale greyish orange.
