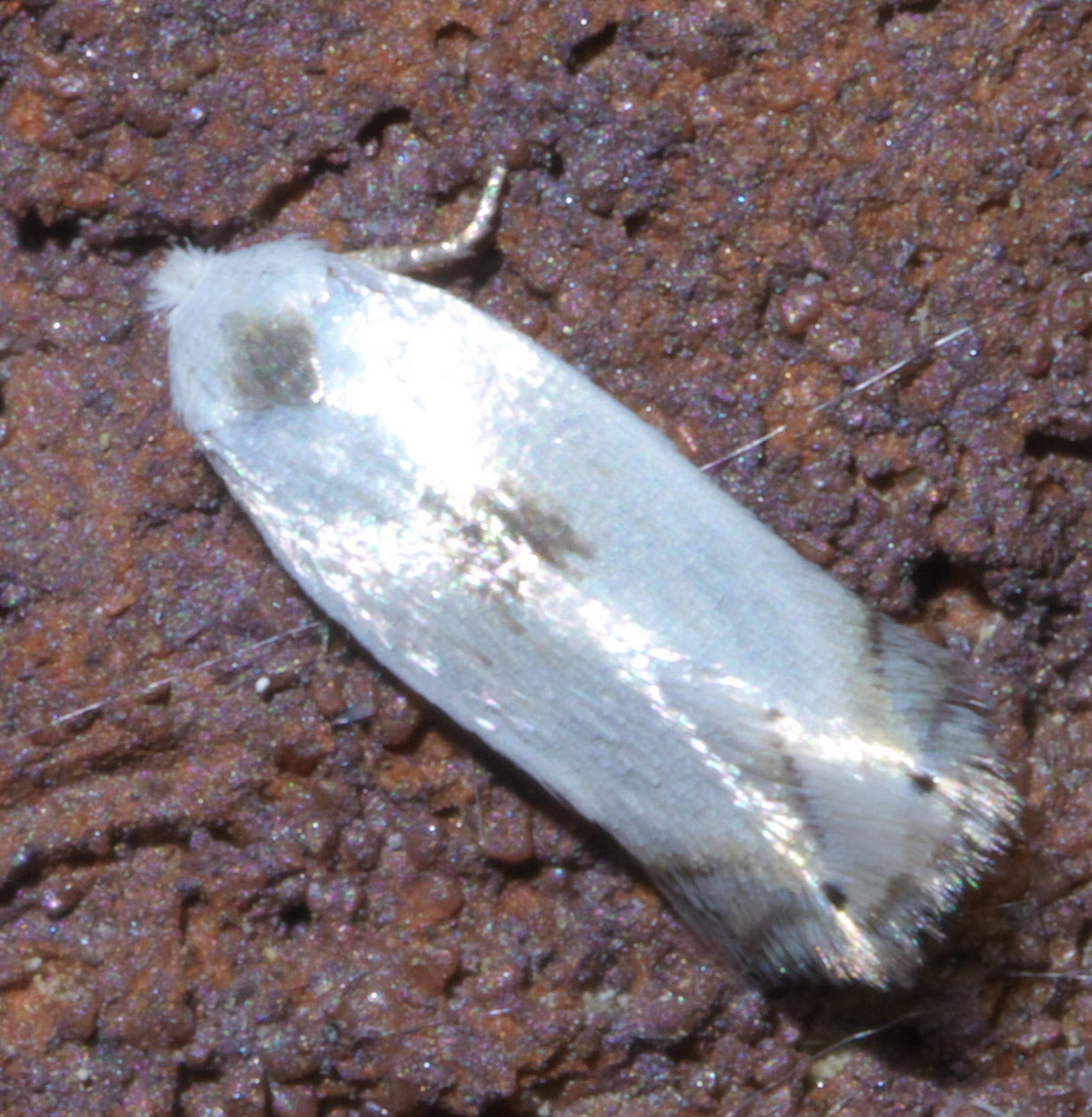

Scientific classification
- Kingdom: Animalia
- Phylum: Arthropoda
- Clade: Pancrustacea
- Class: Insecta
- Order: Lepidoptera
- Family: Opostegidae
- Subfamily: Oposteginae
- Genus: Pseudopostega; Kozlov, 1985

Type species
- Tinea auritella Hübner, 1813

= Pseudopostega =

Genus of moths

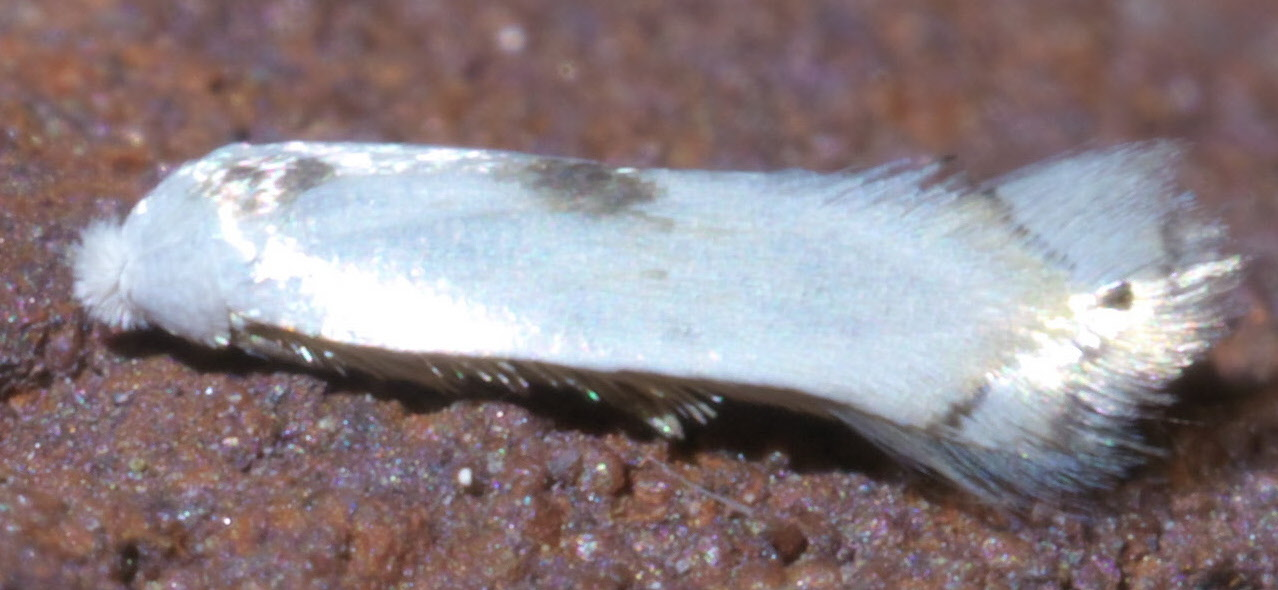
Pseudopostega, probably P. albogaleriella, Size: 4.2 mm

Pseudopostega is a genus of moths of the family Opostegidae.

== Species ==
- Pseudopostega abrupta (Walsingham, 1897)
- Pseudopostega accessoriella (Frey & Boll, 1876)
- Pseudopostega acidata (Meyrick, 1915)
- Pseudopostega acrodicra D.R. Davis & J.R. Stonis, 2007
- Pseudopostega acuminata D.R. Davis & J.R. Stonis, 2007
- Pseudopostega adusta (Walsingham, 1897)
- Pseudopostega albogaleriella (Clemens, 1862)
- Pseudopostega alleni Puplesis & Robinson, 1999
- Pseudopostega amphivittata Puplesis & Robinson, 1999
- Pseudopostega apotoma D.R. Davis & J.R. Stonis, 2007
- Pseudopostega attenuata D.R. Davis & J.R. Stonis, 2007
- Pseudopostega auritella (Hübner, 1813)
- Pseudopostega beckeri D.R. Davis & J.R. Stonis, 2007
- Pseudopostega bellicosa (Meyrick, 1911)
- Pseudopostega bicornuta D.R. Davis & J.R. Stonis, 2007
- Pseudopostega bidorsalis D.R. Davis & J.R. Stonis, 2007
- Pseudopostega brachybasis D.R. Davis & J.R. Stonis, 2007
- Pseudopostega breviapicula D.R. Davis & J.R. Stonis, 2007
- Pseudopostega brevicaudata Stonis, Remeikis and Sruoga, 2013
- Pseudopostega brevifurcata D.R. Davis & J.R. Stonis, 2007
- Pseudopostega brevivalva D.R. Davis & J.R. Stonis, 2007
- Pseudopostega caulifurcata D.R. Davis & J.R. Stonis, 2007
- Pseudopostega chalcopepla (Walsingham, 1908)
- Pseudopostega clastozona (Meyrick, 1913)
- Pseudopostega clavata D.R. Davis & J.R. Stonis, 2007
- Pseudopostega colognatha D.R. Davis & J.R. Stonis, 2007
- Pseudopostega concava D.R. Davis & J.R. Stonis, 2007
- Pseudopostega congruens (Walsingham, 1914)
- Pseudopostega conicula D.R. Davis & J.R. Stonis, 2007
- Pseudopostega constricta D.R. Davis & J.R. Stonis, 2007
- Pseudopostega contigua D.R. Davis & J.R. Stonis, 2007
- Pseudopostega crassifurcata D.R. Davis & J.R. Stonis, 2007
- Pseudopostega crepusculella (Zeller, 1839)
- Pseudopostega cretea (Meyrick, 1920)
- Pseudopostega curtarama D.R. Davis & J.R. Stonis, 2007
- Pseudopostega denticulata D.R. Davis & J.R. Stonis, 2007
- Pseudopostega didyma D.R. Davis & J.R. Stonis, 2007
- Pseudopostega diskusi D.R. Davis & J.R. Stonis, 2007
- Pseudopostega divaricata D.R. Davis & J.R. Stonis, 2007
- Pseudopostega dorsalis D.R. Davis & J.R. Stonis, 2007
  - Pseudopostega dorsalis dorsalis D.R. Davis & J.R. Stonis, 2007
  - Pseudopostega dorsalis fasciata D.R. Davis & J.R. Stonis, 2007
- Pseudopostega duplicata D.R. Davis & J.R. Stonis, 2007
- Pseudopostega euryntis (Meyrick, 1907)
- Pseudopostega ferruginea D.R. Davis & J.R. Stonis, 2007
- Pseudopostega ecuadoriana D.R. Davis & J.R. Stonis, 2007
- Pseudopostega elachista (Walsingham, 1914)
- Pseudopostega epactaea (Meyrick, 1907)
- Pseudopostega floridensis D.R. Davis & J.R. Stonis, 2007
- Pseudopostega frigida (Meyrick, 1906)
- Pseudopostega fungina Puplesis & Robinson, 1999
- Pseudopostega fumida D.R. Davis & J.R. Stonis, 2007
- Pseudopostega galapagosae D.R. Davis & J.R. Stonis, 2007
- Pseudopostega gracilis D.R. Davis & J.R. Stonis, 2007
- Pseudopostega indonesica Puplesis & Robinson, 1999
- Pseudopostega javae Puplesis & Robinson, 1999
- Pseudopostega kempella (Eyer, 1967)
- Pseudopostega lateriplicata D.R. Davis & J.R. Stonis, 2007
- Pseudopostega latiapicula D.R. Davis & J.R. Stonis, 2007
- Pseudopostega latifurcata D.R. Davis & J.R. Stonis, 2007
  - Pseudopostega latifurcata apoclina D.R. Davis & J.R. Stonis, 2007
  - Pseudopostega latifurcata latifurcata D.R. Davis & J.R. Stonis, 2007
- Pseudopostega latiplana Remeikis & Stonis, 2009
- Pseudopostega latisaccula D.R. Davis & J.R. Stonis, 2007
- Pseudopostega lobata D.R. Davis & J.R. Stonis, 2007
- Pseudopostega longifurcata D.R. Davis & J.R. Stonis, 2007
- Pseudopostega longipedicella D.R. Davis & J.R. Stonis, 2007
- Pseudopostega machaerias Meyrick, 1907
- Pseudopostega mexicana Remeikis & Stonis, 2009
- Pseudopostega microacris D.R. Davis & J.R. Stonis, 2007
- Pseudopostega microlepta (Meyrick, 1915)
- Pseudopostega mignonae D.R. Davis & J.R. Stonis, 2007
- Pseudopostega monosperma (Meyrick, 1931)
- Pseudopostega monstruosa D.R. Davis & J.R. Stonis, 2007
- Pseudopostega myxodes Meyrick, 1916
- Pseudopostega napaeella (Clemens, 1872)
- Pseudopostega nepalensis Puplesis & Robinson, 1999
- Pseudopostega nigrimaculella Puplesis & Robinson, 1999
- Pseudopostega obtusa D.R. Davis & J.R. Stonis, 2007
- Pseudopostega ovatula D.R. Davis & J.R. Stonis, 2007
- Pseudopostega parakempella D.R. Davis & J.R. Stonis, 2007
- Pseudopostega paraplicatella D.R. Davis & J.R. Stonis, 2007
- Pseudopostega paromias (Meyrick, 1915)
- Pseudopostega parvilineata Puplesis & Robinson, 1999
- Pseudopostega perdigna (Walsingham, 1914)
- Pseudopostega pexa (Meyrick, 1920)
- Pseudopostega plicatella D.R. Davis & J.R. Stonis, 2007
- Pseudopostega pontifex (Meyrick, 1915)
- Pseudopostega protomochla (Meyrick, 1935)
- Pseudopostega pumila (Walsingham, 1914)
- Pseudopostega quadristrigella (Frey and Boll, 1876)
- Pseudopostega resimafurcata D.R. Davis & J.R. Stonis, 2007
- Pseudopostega robusta Remeikis & Stonis, 2009
- Pseudopostega rotunda D.R. Davis & J.R. Stonis, 2007
- Pseudopostega sacculata (Meyrick, 1915)
- Pseudopostega saltatrix (Walsingham, 1897)
- Pseudopostega saturella Puplesis & Robinson, 1999
- Pseudopostega sectila D.R. Davis & J.R. Stonis, 2007
- Pseudopostega serrata D.R. Davis & J.R. Stonis, 2007
- Pseudopostega similantis Puplesis & Robinson, 1999
- Pseudopostega spatulata D.R. Davis & J.R. Stonis, 2007
- Pseudopostega spilodes Meyrick, 1915
- Pseudopostega strigulata Puplesis & Robinson, 1999
- Pseudopostega sublobata D.R. Davis & J.R. Stonis, 2007
- Pseudopostega subtila D.R. Davis & J.R. Stonis, 2007
- Pseudopostega subviolacea Meyrick, 1920
- Pseudopostega suffuscula D.R. Davis & J.R. Stonis, 2007
- Pseudopostega sumbae Puplesis & Robinson, 1999
- Pseudopostega tanygnatha D.R. Davis & J.R. Stonis, 2007
- Pseudopostega tenuifurcata D.R. Davis & J.R. Stonis, 2007
- Pseudopostega texana D.R. Davis & J.R. Stonis, 2007
- Pseudopostega triangularis D.R. Davis & J.R. Stonis, 2007
- Pseudopostega trinidadensis (Busck, 1910)
- Pseudopostega truncata D.R. Davis & J.R. Stonis, 2007
- Pseudopostega tucumanae D.R. Davis & J.R. Stonis, 2007
- Pseudopostega turquinoensis D.R. Davis & J.R. Stonis, 2007
- Pseudopostega uncinata D.R. Davis & J.R. Stonis, 2007
- Pseudopostega velifera Meyrick, 1920
- Pseudopostega venticola (Walsingham, 1897)
- Pseudopostega zelopa Meyrick, 1905
