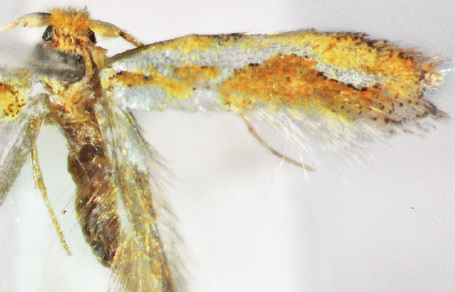

Scientific classification
- Kingdom: Animalia
- Phylum: Arthropoda
- Class: Insecta
- Order: Lepidoptera
- Family: Tineidae
- Genus: Philonome
- Species: P. rivifera

Binomial name
- Philonome rivifera Meyrick, 1915

= Philonome rivifera =

Species of moth

Philonome rivifera is a species of moth of the family Tineidae. It is found in Guyana.

The length of the forewings is 2.8–4.6 mm. The forewings are reddish brown in the medial area, orange in the terminal third of the costal area and pale orange in the basal two-thirds of the costal area and in the basal half of the dorsal area. The longitudinal fascia is white, continuing to the subapical area, accompanied with a slender, dark brown line along the lower margin, curved to the costa at the terminal third. The dorsal bar is white, narrow, connected to a white spreading on the dorsum. The distal area of the costa, termen and apical area are densely irrorated with dark brown. The hindwings are dark greyish brown.
