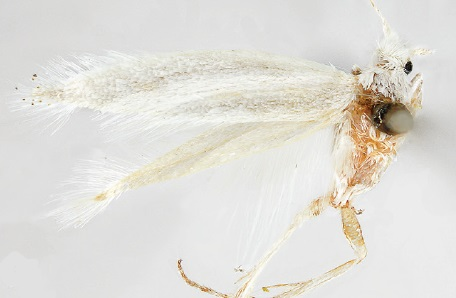

Scientific classification
- Kingdom: Animalia
- Phylum: Arthropoda
- Class: Insecta
- Order: Lepidoptera
- Family: Elachistidae
- Genus: Elachista
- Species: E. dasycara

Binomial name
- Elachista dasycara Kaila, 1999

Synonyms
- Eurynome albella Chambers, 1877 (preocc.); Hemiprosopa albella; Philonome albella

= Elachista dasycara =

Species of moth

Elachista dasycara is a moth of the family Elachistidae. It is in North America, including Colorado, Alberta and Saskatchewan.

The wingspan is 9.5–10.5 millimetres (0.37–0.41 in).
