= Donald R. Davis (entomologist) =

American entomologist (1934–2024)

Donald Ray Davis (March 28, 1934 – October 12, 2024) was an American entomologist, specializing in Lepidoptera (moths).

== Life and career ==
Davis was born in Oklahoma City on March 28, 1934. In 1956, he earned his bachelor's degree in Entomology at the University of Kansas. He received his Ph.D. at Cornell University in 1962.

From 1961 to 2015, Davis was a research entomologist in microlepidoptera for the Smithsonian Institution. Don’s research specialized on the biology, biogeography, and phylogeny of early diverging lineages of Lepidoptera, and he served as official curator for 41 Lepidoptera families while on the Smithsonian staff. Don published more than 200 peer-reviewed research papers and described many hundreds of new moth species during his 54-years long career at the Smithsonian. He conducted fieldwork over much of the United States and in 40 countries, focused on the biology of plant-mining Lepidoptera, that resulted in the addition of many new specimens to NMNH Entomology's collections. Don continued his research at the Smithsonian after his retirement until shortly before his death.

The Lepidopterists' Society awarded him its Karl Jordan Medal in 1977 for his work on the Prodoxidae.

Davis died on October 12, 2024, at the age of 90.

== See also ==
- Category:Taxa named by Donald R. Davis (entomologist)
