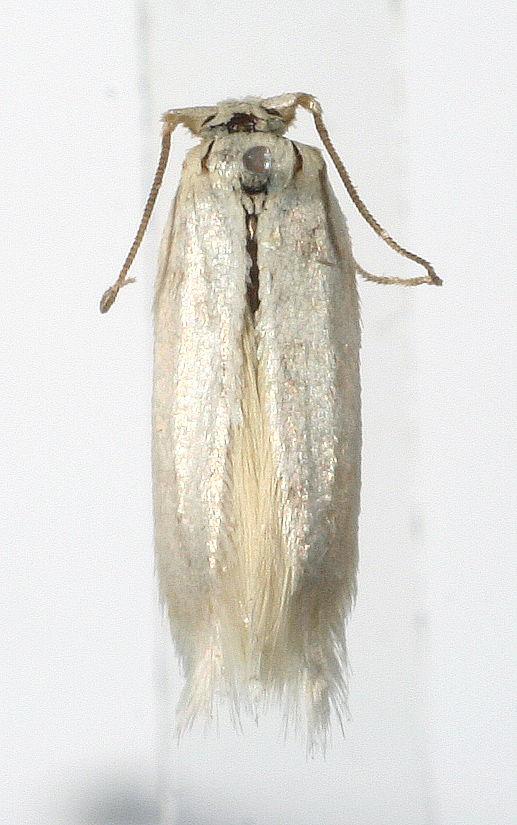
- Opostega salaciella

Scientific classification
- Kingdom: Animalia
- Phylum: Arthropoda
- Class: Insecta
- Order: Lepidoptera
- Superfamily: Nepticuloidea
- Family: Opostegidae; Meyrick, 1893

Subfamilies and Genera
- Oposteginae: Neopostega 5 species; Opostega 60 species; Pseudopostega 116 species; Opostegoidinae: Notiopostega 1 species; Eosopostega 2 species; Opostegoides 24 species; Paralopostega 6 species

Diversity
- About 7 genera and 214 species by late 2013

= Opostegidae =

Family of moths

Opostegidae or "white eyecap moths" is a family of insects in the order Lepidoptera that is characterised by particularly large eyecaps over the compound eyes (see also Nepticulidae, Bucculatricidae, Lyonetiidae). Opostegidae are most diverse in the New World tropics (83 described species, representing 42% of the world total).

These small, whitish moths are probably miners in plant stems. Examples of host plants used in Europe are Lycopus, Mentha and Rumex, but their biology is poorly known. The subfamily Oposteginae comprises 87 described species and Opostegoidinae includes 15 described species.
