= List of moths of Australia (Opostegidae) =

Partial list of Australian moths

This is a list of the Australian moth species of the family Opostegidae. It also acts as an index to the species articles and forms part of the full List of moths of Australia.

- Opostega arthrota Meyrick, 1915
- Opostega atypa Turner, 1923
- Opostega basilissa Meyrick, 1893
- Opostega brithys Turner, 1923
- Opostega chalcoplethes Turner, 1923
- Opostega chalinias Meyrick, 1893
- Opostega chordacta Meyrick, 1915
- Opostega diorthota Meyrick, 1893
- Opostega horaria Meyrick, 1921
- Opostega luticilia Meyrick, 1915
- Opostega monotypa Turner, 1923
- Opostega nubifera Turner, 1900
- Opostega orestias Meyrick, 1880
- Opostega phaeospila Turner, 1923
- Opostega scoliozona Meyrick, 1915
- Opostega stiriella Meyrick, 1880
- Opostega xenodoxa Meyrick, 1893
- Opostegoides gephyraea (Meyrick, 1880)
