= List of Garuda Indonesia accidents and incidents =

This is a list of incidents involving Indonesian airline Garuda Indonesia. The airline suffered 49 incidents.

== Fatal accidents ==
=== 1950s ===
17 November 1950
Douglas DC-3 PK-DPB overran the runway on landing at Juanda Airport Surabaya and crashed into a ditch, killing two of 23 on board.

24 December 1959
Flight 330, a Douglas C-47A (PK-GDV) en route to Pangkal Pinang from Palembang, crashed in a swamp near Palembang while returning to the airport following engine failure, killing one of four crew. The pilot had descended too low in poor weather; the aircraft may also have been slightly overloaded.

=== 1960s ===
24 January 1961
Flight 424, a Douglas C-47A (PK-GDI), disappeared while on a Jakarta-Bandung passenger service with 21 onboard; the wreckage was found four days later on the slope of Mount Burangrang, West Java with no survivors. The cause was blamed on pilot error.

3 February 1961
Flight 542, a Douglas C-47A (PK-GDY), disappeared over the Java Sea off Madura Island on a Surabaya–Balikpapan service with 26 on board; the wreckage has never been found.

20 September 1963
Scottish Aviation Twin Pioneer PK-GTB crashed, killing 7. (Note: Some sources state the aircraft crashed on landing on 20 April.)

1 January 1966
Douglas C-47As PK-GDE and PK-GDU collided in mid-air while on approach to Palembang Airport, probably due to crew errors; both aircraft crashed in a swamp, killing all 34 on board both aircraft.

16 February 1967
Flight 708, a Lockheed L-188C Electra PK-GLB 'Tjandi Borobudur', crashed on landing at Manado due to pilot error in bad weather, killing 22 of 92 on board.

28 May 1968
Flight 892, a Convair 990A PK-GJA 'Pajajaran', crashed after takeoff from Bombay, India, killing all 29 people on board and one person on the ground.

=== 1970s ===
26 September 1972
Fokker F27-600 PK-GFP 'Sibayak' banked right and crashed after climbing to 30 m (98 ft) following takeoff from Kemayoran Airport, Jakarta during a training flight, killing the three crew.

7 September 1974
Fokker F27-600 PK-GFJ 'Semaru' struck buildings while on approach to Branti Airport in Bandar Lampung, killing 33 of 36 people on board.

4 December 1974
Martinair Flight 138 (PH-MBH) Leased to Garuda Indonesian Airways for a Hajj flight crashed in Colombo, Sri Lanka, killing all 191 on board.

24 September 1975
Flight 150, a Fokker F28-1000, crashed on approach to Sultan Mahmud Badaruddin II Airport in Palembang. The accident, which was attributed to poor weather and fog, killed 25 out of 61 passengers and one person on the ground.

15 November 1978
Loftleiðir Flight 001 (TF-FLA) Leased to Garuda Indonesian Airways for a Hajj flight crashed in Colombo, Sri Lanka, killing 183 out of 262 on board.

6 March 1979
Flight 553, a Fokker F28-1000 PK-GVP 'Sambas', struck Mount Bromo (near Probolinggo, East Java) while on a positioning flight from Denpasar to Surabaya, killing the four crew.

11 July 1979
Fokker F28-1000 PK-GVE struck Mount Sibayak on approach to Medan Airport, killing all 61 on board.

=== 1980s ===
20 March 1982
Fokker F28-1000 PK-GVK overran the runway at Tanjung Karang-Branti Airport in Bandar Lampung during bad weather. The aircraft subsequently burst into flames killing all 27 people on board.

2 June 1983
Fokker F28-3000RC PK-GFV 'Selegan' overran the runway on takeoff from Branti Airport after failing to lift off as a result of crew error, killing three of 61 onboard.

4 April 1987
Flight 035, a McDonnell Douglas DC-9-32, hit a pylon and crashed on approach to Polonia International Airport in Medan during bad weather due to possible wind shear, killing 23 of 45 on board.

=== 1990s ===
13 June 1996
Flight 865, a McDonnell Douglas DC-10-30, overran the runway at Fukuoka Airport, Japan after aborting takeoff following an uncontained failure of engine three. Three of the 275 people on board were killed. The crash was blamed on pilot error and improper maintenance.

26 September 1997
Flight 152, an Airbus A300B4-220, crashed near the village of Buah Nabar in Sibolangit, 18 miles (29 km) short of Medan Airport in low visibility, killing all 234 people on board. It is the deadliest aviation incident in Indonesia.

=== 2000s ===
16 January 2002
Flight 421, a Boeing 737-3Q8 en route from Lombok to Yogyakarta was forced to make an emergency landing but finally crashed in poor weather on the Solo River, due to an engine flameout caused by water and hail ingestion. A flight attendant was killed in the accident.

7 March 2007
Flight 200, a Boeing 737-400 flying from Jakarta to Yogyakarta, overran the runway on landing at Adisutjipto International Airport, Yogyakarta. 21 people were killed when the aircraft burst into flames.

== Non-fatal accidents ==
15 March 1952
Convair CV-240-23 PK-GCH collided in mid-air with Douglas C-47A PK-RCR; both aircraft landed safely with no casualties.

10 December 1958
de Havilland Heron 1B PK-GHP was written off at Jakarta; no casualties.

29 December 1961
Douglas C-47A PK-GDZ crashed near Surabaya.

27 February 1962
Convair CV-240-23 PK-GCB was written off at Palembang.

5 April 1962
Douglas C-47A PK-GDM burned out at Kemayoran Airport, Jakarta.

17 August 1962
Convair CV-240-23 PK-GCE was written off at Ambon.

4 May 1963
Scottish Aviation Twin Pioneer 3 PK-GTC was written off during takeoff.
20 September 1981
A McDonnell Douglas DC-9-32 (PK-GNJ) "Porong", made an emergency landing due to engine failure. During landing, both left rear tires burst, causing the tire rims to scrape the runway. The aircraft was repaired and back to service. All 38 passengers and crew survived.
21 June 1993
Flight 630, a McDonnell Douglas DC-9-32 (PK-GNT), landed hard at Ngurah Rai Airport due to pilot error, causing serious damage to the aircraft; all 79 on board survived.

16 March 2013
While parked at Soekarno-Hatta International Airport, Boeing 737-5U3 PK-GGA was struck by a maintenance dock on the right side of the nose during a storm; no casualties. The 737 and a GECAS Airbus A320 (N620SC) were parked opposite hangar No. 3 when two maintenance docks were blown across the ramp, striking the aircraft; the 737 was written off. The accident was also reported to have occurred on March 15.

== Hijackings ==
5 September 1977
A McDonnell Douglas DC-9 Garuda Indonesian Airways Flight 488 which was serving the Jakarta-Surabaya flight route was hijacked by a passenger named Triyudo, an honorary civilian employee of the Indonesian Air Force. The plane was preparing to take off at 19.00 Indonesian time. However, the hijacker immediately issued a "badik" to take the flight attendant hostage. The hijacker had not yet had time to issue charges, but suddenly a passenger grabbed him from behind.

28 March 1981
Flight 206, operated by McDonnell Douglas DC-9-32 PK-GNJ, was hijacked on a domestic flight from Palembang to Medan by five members of Komando Jihad. The hijackers demanded to be flown to Sri Lanka, but the aircraft did not have enough fuel and diverted to Penang in Malaysia to refuel, and then flew to Bangkok. The hijackers demanded the release of 84 political prisoners in Indonesia who were imprisoned following a terrorist attack on a police station. On the third day of the hijacking (31 March) was stormed by Indonesian Kopassus commandos, surprising the hijackers, who opened fire on the commandos. They returned fire, killing three hijackers. One of the commandos was shot, probably by his comrades, as was the pilot, also probably by Indonesian commandos. The rest of the hostages were released unharmed. Two of the hijackers surrendered to the Thai commandos, but were killed by Indonesian commandos on the plane taking them back to Jakarta.

26 May 1994
A Vietnamese asylum seeker being repatriated from an Indonesian refugee camp attempted to hijack a Garuda Indonesia charter flight. Shortly after takeoff from Batam, the man took out a gasoline-filled shampoo bottle, splashed gasoline near the cockpit door, and threatened to light himself on fire unless the flight diverted to Australia. A Garuda mechanic and other asylum seekers overpowered the man and the flight continued to Vietnam, where the man was taken into custody upon arrival.

== Miscellaneous ==
7 September 2004
Human rights activist Munir Said Thalib was murdered on Flight 974, bound for Amsterdam. Garuda's CEO at the time, Indra Setiawan, his deputy Rohainil Aini, and pilot Pollycarpus Priyanto were all convicted of his murder. Garuda was found negligent in failing to perform an emergency landing and was ordered to pay compensation to Munir's widow, but did not do so immediately.
