= Opostegoides tetroa =

Scientific classification
- Kingdom: Animalia
- Phylum: Arthropoda
- Class: Insecta
- Order: Lepidoptera
- Family: Opostegidae
- Genus: Opostegoides
- Species: O. tetroa

Binomial name
- Opostegoides tetroa (Meyrick, 1907)

Synonyms
- Opostega tetroa Meyrick, 1907

Species of moth

Opostegoides tetroa is a moth of the family Opostegidae. It was described by Edward Meyrick in 1907. It is known from Maskeliya, Sri Lanka.
