= Opostegoides nephelozona =

Scientific classification
- Kingdom: Animalia
- Phylum: Arthropoda
- Class: Insecta
- Order: Lepidoptera
- Family: Opostegidae
- Genus: Opostegoides
- Species: O. nephelozona

Binomial name
- Opostegoides nephelozona (Meyrick, 1915)

Synonyms
- Opostega nephelozona Meyrick, 1915

Species of moth

Opostegoides nephelozona is a moth of the family Opostegidae. It was described by Edward Meyrick in 1915. It is known from Maskeliya, Sri Lanka.
