= Machairophora fulvipuncta =

Scientific classification
- Kingdom: Animalia
- Phylum: Arthropoda
- Class: Insecta
- Order: Lepidoptera
- Superfamily: Noctuoidea
- Family: Erebidae
- Subfamily: Arctiinae
- Genus: Machairophora
- Species: M. fulvipuncta

Binomial name
- Machairophora fulvipuncta Hampson, 1893

Species of moth

Machairophora fulvipuncta is a moth of the subfamily Arctiinae. It was described by George Hampson in 1893 from the Maskeliya area in Sri Lanka.

== Description ==
Its wingspan is about 20 mm. In the male, the head, collar and tegula are orange yellow. Its thorax is dark brownish with a few orange scales. Abdomen and wings are very dark brown. Forewings with a dusky-yellow patch at the center of the inner margin. The female is wingless.
