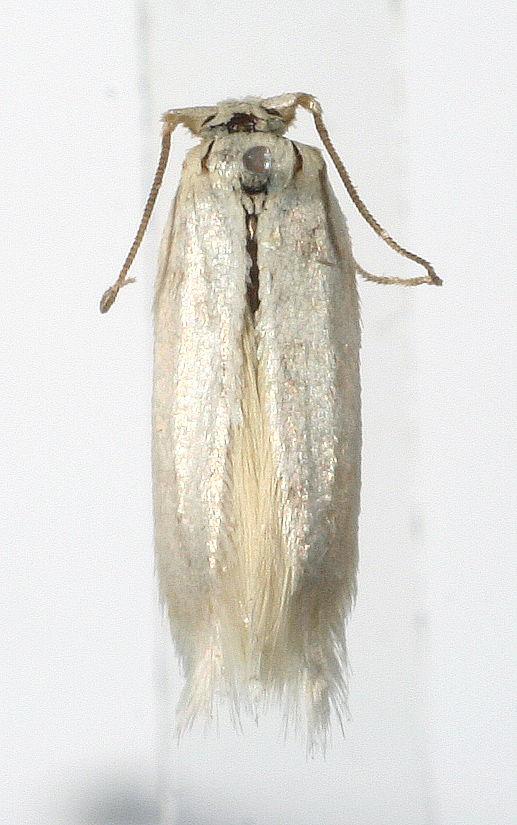
- Opostega salaciella, the type species of the genus

Scientific classification
- Kingdom: Animalia
- Phylum: Arthropoda
- Class: Insecta
- Order: Lepidoptera
- Family: Opostegidae
- Subfamily: Oposteginae
- Genus: Opostega; Zeller, 1839

Type species
- Elachista salaciella Treitschke, 1914

= Opostega =

Genus of moths

Opostega is a genus of moths of the family Opostegidae with 49 listed species.

== Species ==
- Opostega afghani D.R. Davis, 1989
- Opostega amphimitra Meyrick, 1913
- Opostega angulata Gerasimov, 1930
- Opostega argentella Bradley, 1957
- Opostega arthrota Meyrick, 1915
- Opostega atypa Turner, 1923
- Opostega basilissa Meyrick, 1893
- Opostega bimaculatella Rothschild, 1912
- Opostega brithys Turner, 1923
- Opostega chalcophylla Meyrick, 1910
- Opostega chalcoplethes Turner, 1923
- Opostega chalinias Meyrick, 1893
- Opostega chordacta Meyrick, 1915
- Opostega cirrhacma Meyrick, 1911
- Opostega costantiniella Costantini, 1923
- Opostega cretatella Chrétien, 1915
- Opostega diorthota Meyrick, 1893
- Opostega diplardis Meyrick, 1912
- Opostega granifera Meyrick, 1913
- Opostega heringella Mariani, 1937
- Opostega horaria Meyrick, 1921
- Opostega idiocoma Meyrick, 1918
- Opostega ischnophaea Meyrick, 1930
- Opostega kuznetzovi Kozlov, 1985
- Opostega luticilia Meyrick, 1915
- Opostega melitardis Meyrick, 1918
- Opostega monotypa Turner, 1923
- Opostega nubifera Turner, 1900
- Opostega orestias Meyrick, 1880
- Opostega orophoxantha Meyrick, 1921
- Opostega pelocrossa Meyrick, 1928
- Opostega phaeosoma Meyrick, 1928
- Opostega phaeospila Turner, 1923
- Opostega praefusca Meyrick, 1913
- Opostega radiosa Meyrick, 1913
- Opostega rezniki Kozlov, 1985
- Opostega salaciella (Treitschke, 1833)
- Opostega scoliozona Meyrick, 1915
- Opostega snelleni Nolcken, 1882
- Opostega spatulella Herrich-Schäffer, 1855
- Opostega stekolnikovi Kozlov, 1985
- Opostega stiriella Meyrick, 1881
- Opostega symbolica Meyrick, 1914
- Opostega tincta Meyrick, 1918
- Opostega xenodoxa Meyrick, 1893
