= Coleophora crossophanes =

Scientific classification
- Kingdom: Animalia
- Phylum: Arthropoda
- Class: Insecta
- Order: Lepidoptera
- Family: Coleophoridae
- Genus: Coleophora
- Species: C. crossophanes

Binomial name
- Coleophora crossophanes Meyrick, 1917

Species of moth

Coleophora crossophanes is a moth of the family Coleophoridae. It is found in Maskeliya, Sri Lanka.

== Taxonomy ==
Research has concluded that Coleophora crossophanes does not belong to the family Coleophoridae. It could belong to the family Momphidae.
