= Flight 892 =

Flight 892 may refer to:

- Garuda Indonesian Airways Flight 892, which crashed on 28 May 1968, killing all 29 on board and one on the ground
- Aeroflot Flight 892, which crashed on 12 December 1986, killing 72 of the 82 passengers on board
