= Opostega amphimitra =

Scientific classification
- Kingdom: Animalia
- Phylum: Arthropoda
- Class: Insecta
- Order: Lepidoptera
- Family: Opostegidae
- Genus: Opostega
- Species: O. amphimitra

Binomial name
- Opostega amphimitra Meyrick, 1913

Species of moth

Opostega amphimitra is a moth of the family Opostegidae. It was described by Edward Meyrick in 1913. It is known from the area of the former Transvaal Province in South Africa.

Adults have been recorded from December to February.
