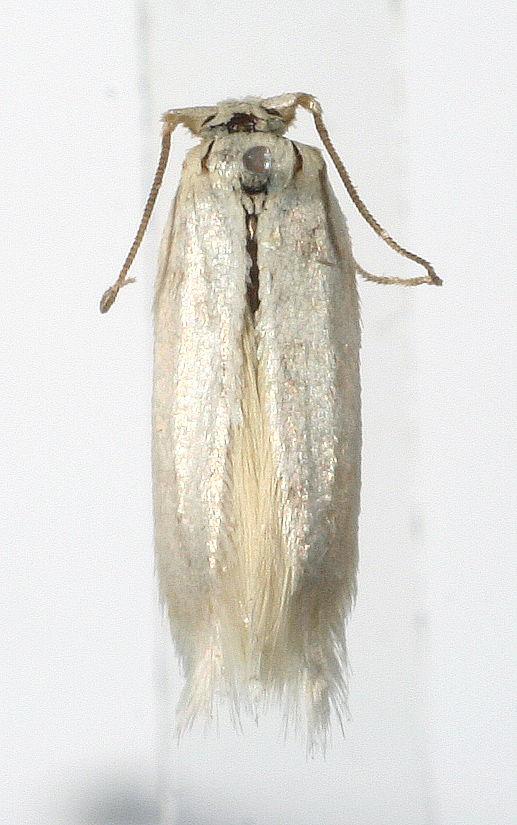

Scientific classification
- Kingdom: Animalia
- Phylum: Arthropoda
- Class: Insecta
- Order: Lepidoptera
- Family: Opostegidae
- Genus: Opostega
- Species: O. salaciella

Binomial name
- Opostega salaciella (Treitschke, 1833)

Synonyms
- Elachista salaciella Treitschke, 1914; Opostega reliquella Zeller, 1848; Sorrel Bent-wing

= Opostega salaciella =

Species of moth

Opostega salaciella is a moth of the family Opostegidae. It is found in Europe.

The wingspan is about 10 mm. The forewings are white; sometimes an indistinct yellowish fascia towards apex, often entirely absent. Hindwings whitish-grey.

A small snow-white moth. The first joint of the antennae is greatly expanded and forms an "eyelid" over the compound eye. The antennae is filamentous, light brown and about 4/5 as long as the forewing. The innermost, greatly expanded joint is snow-white. The head, forebody, and wings are all gleaming white. In the outer part of the forewing (where the wing fringes begin) there may be a faint, yellowish transverse stripe that does not reach all the way to the leading edge. The hind body is brownish-grey with a white tail tassel. The moths fly boldly towards dusk, and come freely to lamps, from June to July depending on the location. It prefers dry open habitats.

The larvae feed on Rumex acetosella, probably inside the stems.
