= Opostega spatulella =

Scientific classification
- Kingdom: Animalia
- Phylum: Arthropoda
- Class: Insecta
- Order: Lepidoptera
- Family: Opostegidae
- Genus: Opostega
- Species: O. spatulella

Binomial name
- Opostega spatulella Herrich-Schäffer, 1855

Synonyms
- Opostega bimaculatella Rothschild, 1912; Opostega costantiniella Costantini, 1923; Opostega heringella Mariani, 1937

Species of moth

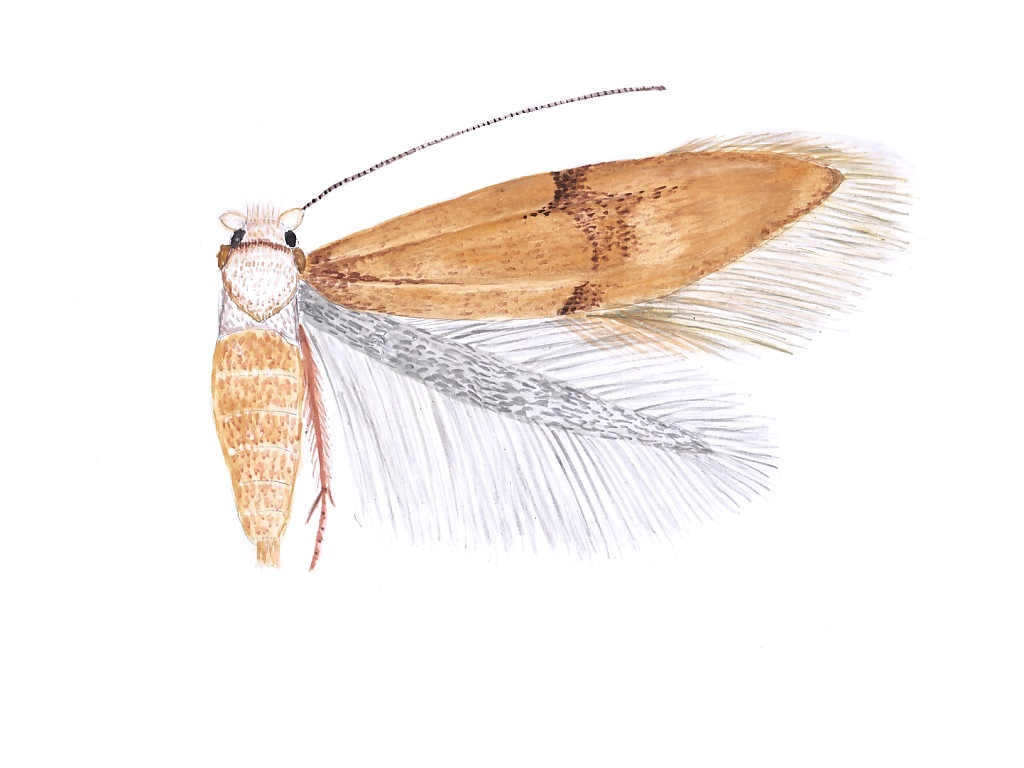
Opostega spatulella

Opostega spatulella is a moth of the family Opostegidae. It is known from France, the Iberian Peninsula, Italy, Austria, the Czech Republic, Slovakia, Hungary, Romania, Bulgaria, North Macedonia, Greece and Bosnia and Herzegovina. It is thought to be extinct in Great Britain. It is also found in the eastern part of the Palearctic realm (including Turkmenistan and Uzbekistan) and the Near East.

The wingspan is 9–11 mm. Adults are on wing from August to June and hibernate from October to April. There is one generation per year.

The larvae are known to feed on Ulmus and Salix species. They mine the bark of their host plant.
