= Opostegoides albellus =

Scientific classification
- Kingdom: Animalia
- Phylum: Arthropoda
- Clade: Pancrustacea
- Class: Insecta
- Order: Lepidoptera
- Family: Opostegidae
- Genus: Opostegoides
- Species: O. albellus

Binomial name
- Opostegoides albellus Sinev, 1990

Species of moth

Opostegoides albellus is a moth of the family Opostegidae. It was described by Sinev in 1990, and is known from Japan.

The wingspan is about 10 mm.
