= Opostega chalcophylla =

Scientific classification
- Kingdom: Animalia
- Phylum: Arthropoda
- Class: Insecta
- Order: Lepidoptera
- Family: Opostegidae
- Genus: Opostega
- Species: O. chalcophylla

Binomial name
- Opostega chalcophylla Meyrick, 1910

Species of moth

Opostega chalcophylla is a moth of the family Opostegidae. It was described by Edward Meyrick in 1910. It is known from Assam in India.

Adults have been recorded in September.
