= Opostega ischnophaea =

Scientific classification
- Kingdom: Animalia
- Phylum: Arthropoda
- Class: Insecta
- Order: Lepidoptera
- Family: Opostegidae
- Genus: Opostega
- Species: O. ischnophaea

Binomial name
- Opostega ischnophaea Meyrick, 1930

Species of moth

Opostega ischnophaea is a moth of the family Opostegidae. It was described by Edward Meyrick in 1930. It is found in India.

The wingspan is 6–7 mm.
