= Opostegoides argentisoma =

Scientific classification
- Domain: Eukaryota
- Kingdom: Animalia
- Phylum: Arthropoda
- Class: Insecta
- Order: Lepidoptera
- Family: Opostegidae
- Genus: Opostegoides
- Species: O. argentisoma

Binomial name
- Opostegoides argentisoma Puplesis & Robinson, 1999

Species of moth

Opostegoides argentisoma is a moth of the family Opostegidae. It was described by Puplesis and Robinson in 1999, and is known from Kalimantan (the Indonesian portion of the island of Borneo).
