= Opostega kuznetzovi =

Scientific classification
- Kingdom: Animalia
- Phylum: Arthropoda
- Class: Insecta
- Order: Lepidoptera
- Family: Opostegidae
- Genus: Opostega
- Species: O. kuznetzovi

Binomial name
- Opostega kuznetzovi Kozlov, 1985

Species of moth

Opostega kuznetzovi is a moth of the family Opostegidae. It was described by Kozlov in 1985. It has mainly been found in the Russian Far East.

Adults have been recorded in July.
