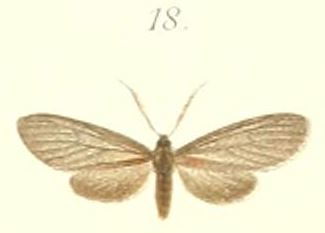

Scientific classification
- Domain: Eukaryota
- Kingdom: Animalia
- Phylum: Arthropoda
- Class: Insecta
- Order: Lepidoptera
- Superfamily: Noctuoidea
- Family: Erebidae
- Subfamily: Arctiinae
- Genus: Machairophora
- Species: M. fumigata

Binomial name
- Machairophora fumigata Pagenstecher, 1900

Synonyms
- Machaerophora fumigata

= Machairophora fumigata =

Species of moth

Machairophora fumigata is a moth of the subfamily Arctiinae first described by Arnold Pagenstecher in 1900. It is found in Papua New Guinea.
