= Opostega argentella =

Scientific classification
- Kingdom: Animalia
- Phylum: Arthropoda
- Class: Insecta
- Order: Lepidoptera
- Family: Opostegidae
- Genus: Opostega
- Species: O. argentella

Binomial name
- Opostega argentella Bradley, 1957

Species of moth

Opostega argentella is a moth of the family Opostegidae. It was described by John David Bradley in 1957. It is known from the Solomon Islands.

Adults have been recorded in November.
