= Opostega orophoxantha =

Scientific classification
- Kingdom: Animalia
- Phylum: Arthropoda
- Class: Insecta
- Order: Lepidoptera
- Family: Opostegidae
- Genus: Opostega
- Species: O. orophoxantha

Binomial name
- Opostega orophoxantha Meyrick, 1921

Species of moth

Opostega orophoxantha is a moth of the family Opostegidae. It was described by Edward Meyrick in 1921. It is known from Umtali, Zimbabwe.
