= Opostegoides index =

Scientific classification
- Kingdom: Animalia
- Phylum: Arthropoda
- Class: Insecta
- Order: Lepidoptera
- Family: Opostegidae
- Genus: Opostegoides
- Species: O. index

Binomial name
- Opostegoides index Meyrick, 1922

Synonyms
- Opostega index Meyrick, 1922

Species of moth

Opostegoides index is a moth of the family Opostegidae. It was described by Edward Meyrick in 1922. It is known from Assam in India.

Adults have been recorded in July.
