= Opostega pelocrossa =

Scientific classification
- Kingdom: Animalia
- Phylum: Arthropoda
- Class: Insecta
- Order: Lepidoptera
- Family: Opostegidae
- Genus: Opostega
- Species: O. pelocrossa

Binomial name
- Opostega pelocrossa Meyrick, 1928

Species of moth

Opostega pelocrossa is a moth of the family Opostegidae. It was described by Edward Meyrick in 1928. It is known from Mazoe, Zimbabwe.
