= Opostegoides longipedicella =

Scientific classification
- Kingdom: Animalia
- Phylum: Arthropoda
- Class: Insecta
- Order: Lepidoptera
- Family: Opostegidae
- Genus: Opostegoides
- Species: O. longipedicella

Binomial name
- Opostegoides longipedicella Puplesis & Robinson, 1999

Species of moth

Opostegoides longipedicella is a moth of the family Opostegidae. It was described by Puplesis and Robinson in 1999, and is known from Assam in India.
