= Opostega phaeosoma =

Scientific classification
- Kingdom: Animalia
- Phylum: Arthropoda
- Class: Insecta
- Order: Lepidoptera
- Family: Opostegidae
- Genus: Opostega
- Species: O. phaeosoma

Binomial name
- Opostega phaeosoma Meyrick, 1928

Species of moth

Opostega phaeosoma is a moth of the family Opostegidae. It was described by Edward Meyrick in 1928. It is known from Mazoe, Zimbabwe.
