= Opostega angulata =

Scientific classification
- Kingdom: Animalia
- Phylum: Arthropoda
- Class: Insecta
- Order: Lepidoptera
- Family: Opostegidae
- Genus: Opostega
- Species: O. angulata

Binomial name
- Opostega angulata Gerasimov, 1930

Species of moth

Opostega angulata is a moth of the family Opostegidae. It was described by Aleksey Maksimovich Gerasimov in 1930. It is known from Uzbekistan.

Adults have been recorded in April, June, July and August.
