= Opostegoides scioterma =

Scientific classification
- Kingdom: Animalia
- Phylum: Arthropoda
- Class: Insecta
- Order: Lepidoptera
- Family: Opostegidae
- Genus: Opostegoides
- Species: O. scioterma

Binomial name
- Opostegoides scioterma (Meyrick, 1920)

Synonyms
- Opostega scioterma Meyrick, 1920

Species of moth

Opostegoides scioterma is a moth of the family Opostegidae. It is probably widespread across most of the northern United States and southern Canada from western Oregon, Washington and British Columbia east to Ontario and Maine.

The length of the forewings is 3.1-4.4 mm. Adults have been collected from mid-June to early August.
