= Opostegoides =

Scientific classification
- Kingdom: Animalia
- Phylum: Arthropoda
- Class: Insecta
- Order: Lepidoptera
- Family: Opostegidae
- Subfamily: Opostegoidinae
- Genus: Opostegoides; Kozlov, 1985

Type species
- Opostega minodensis Kuroko, 1982

Genus of moths

Opostegoides is a genus of moths of the family Opostegidae.

== Species ==
- Opostegoides albellus Sinev, 1990
- Opostegoides argentisoma Puplesis & Robinson, 1999
- Opostegoides auriptera Puplesis & Robinson, 1999
- Opostegoides bicolorella Sinev, 1990
- Opostegoides cameroni Puplesis & Robinson, 1999
- Opostegoides epistolaris (Meyrick, 1911)
- Opostegoides flavimacula Puplesis & Robinson, 1999
- Opostegoides gephyraea (Meyrick, 1881)
- Opostegoides gorgonea Puplesis & Robinson, 1999
- Opostegoides index Meyrick, 1922
- Opostegoides longipedicella Puplesis & Robinson, 1999
- Opostegoides malaysiensis D.R. Davis, 1989
- Opostegoides menthinella (Mann, 1855)
- Opostegoides minodensis (Kuroko, 1982)
- Opostegoides nephelozona (Meyrick, 1915)
- Opostegoides omelkoi Kozlov, 1985
- Opostegoides padiensis Sinev, 1990
- Opostegoides pelorrhoa (Meyrick, 1915)
- Opostegoides scioterma (Meyrick, 1920)
- Opostegoides sinevi Kozlov, 1985
- Opostegoides spinifera Puplesis & Robinson, 1999
- Opostegoides tetroa (Meyrick, 1907)
- Opostegoides thailandica Puplesis & Robinson, 1999
- Opostegoides uvida (Meyrick, 1915)
