= Opostega afghani =

Scientific classification
- Kingdom: Animalia
- Phylum: Arthropoda
- Class: Insecta
- Order: Lepidoptera
- Family: Opostegidae
- Genus: Opostega
- Species: O. afghani

Binomial name
- Opostega afghani Davis, 1989

Species of moth

Opostega afghani is a moth of the family Opostegidae. It was described by Donald R. Davis in 1989. It is known from Afghanistan.

The length of the forewings is 3.8–4.2 mm. Adults have been recorded from mid May to mid June. There is one generation per year.

== Etymology ==
The species name is from the Pashto (or Afghan) term meaning a native or inhabitant of Afghanistan.
