= Opostega diplardis =

Scientific classification
- Kingdom: Animalia
- Phylum: Arthropoda
- Class: Insecta
- Order: Lepidoptera
- Family: Opostegidae
- Genus: Opostega
- Species: O. diplardis

Binomial name
- Opostega diplardis Meyrick, 1912

Species of moth

Opostega diplardis is a moth of the family Opostegidae. It was described by Edward Meyrick in 1912. It is known from the area of the former Transvaal Province in South Africa.

Adults have been recorded in January.
