= Opostegoides omelkoi =

Scientific classification
- Domain: Eukaryota
- Kingdom: Animalia
- Phylum: Arthropoda
- Class: Insecta
- Order: Lepidoptera
- Family: Opostegidae
- Genus: Opostegoides
- Species: O. omelkoi

Binomial name
- Opostegoides omelkoi Kozlov, 1985

Species of moth

Opostegoides omelkoi is a moth of the family Opostegidae. It was described by Kozlov in 1985. It is known from the Russian Far East.

Adults have been recorded in August.
