= Opostegoides bicolorella =

Scientific classification
- Kingdom: Animalia
- Phylum: Arthropoda
- Clade: Pancrustacea
- Class: Insecta
- Order: Lepidoptera
- Family: Opostegidae
- Genus: Opostegoides
- Species: O. bicolorella

Binomial name
- Opostegoides bicolorella Sinev, 1990

Species of moth

Opostegoides bicolorella is a moth of the family Opostegidae. It was described by Sinev in 1990, and is known from the Russian Far East.
