= Opostega stekolnikovi =

Scientific classification
- Kingdom: Animalia
- Phylum: Arthropoda
- Class: Insecta
- Order: Lepidoptera
- Family: Opostegidae
- Genus: Opostega
- Species: O. stekolnikovi

Binomial name
- Opostega stekolnikovi Kozlov, 1985

Species of moth

Opostega stekolnikovi is a moth of the family Opostegidae. It was described by Koslov in 1985. It is known from the former Soviet Union.
