= Opostega rezniki =

Scientific classification
- Kingdom: Animalia
- Phylum: Arthropoda
- Class: Insecta
- Order: Lepidoptera
- Family: Opostegidae
- Genus: Opostega
- Species: O. rezniki

Binomial name
- Opostega rezniki Koslov, 1985

Species of moth

Opostega rezniki is a moth of the family Opostegidae. It was described by Koslov in 1985. It is known from Kazakhstan.
