= Opostega praefusca =

Scientific classification
- Kingdom: Animalia
- Phylum: Arthropoda
- Class: Insecta
- Order: Lepidoptera
- Family: Opostegidae
- Genus: Opostega
- Species: O. praefusca

Binomial name
- Opostega praefusca Meyrick, 1913

Species of moth

Opostega praefusca is a moth of the family Opostegidae. It was described by Edward Meyrick in 1913. It is known from the area of the former Transvaal Province, South Africa.
