= Opostega cirrhacma =

Scientific classification
- Kingdom: Animalia
- Phylum: Arthropoda
- Class: Insecta
- Order: Lepidoptera
- Family: Opostegidae
- Genus: Opostega
- Species: O. cirrhacma

Binomial name
- Opostega cirrhacma Meyrick, 1911

Species of moth

Opostega cirrhacma is a moth of the family Opostegidae. It was described by Edward Meyrick in 1911. It is known from the area of the former Transvaal Province in South Africa.

Adults have been recorded in December.
