= Opostega symbolica =

Scientific classification
- Kingdom: Animalia
- Phylum: Arthropoda
- Class: Insecta
- Order: Lepidoptera
- Family: Opostegidae
- Genus: Opostega
- Species: O. symbolica

Binomial name
- Opostega symbolica Meyrick, 1914

Species of moth

Opostega symbolica is a moth of the family Opostegidae. It was described by Edward Meyrick in 1914. It is known from Natal, South Africa.
