= Opostegoides sinevi =

Scientific classification
- Domain: Eukaryota
- Kingdom: Animalia
- Phylum: Arthropoda
- Class: Insecta
- Order: Lepidoptera
- Family: Opostegidae
- Genus: Opostegoides
- Species: O. sinevi

Binomial name
- Opostegoides sinevi Koslov, 1985

Species of moth

Opostegoides sinevi is a moth of the family Opostegidae. It was described by Koslov in 1985. It is known from the Russian Far East.

Adults have been recorded in May.
