= Opostegoides pelorrhoa =

Scientific classification
- Kingdom: Animalia
- Phylum: Arthropoda
- Class: Insecta
- Order: Lepidoptera
- Family: Opostegidae
- Genus: Opostegoides
- Species: O. pelorrhoa

Binomial name
- Opostegoides pelorrhoa Meyrick, 1915

Synonyms
- Opostega pelorrhoa Meyrick, 1915

Species of moth

Opostegoides pelorrhoa is a moth of the family Opostegidae. It was described by Edward Meyrick in 1915. It is known from Assam, India.
