= Opostegoides malaysiensis =

Scientific classification
- Kingdom: Animalia
- Phylum: Arthropoda
- Class: Insecta
- Order: Lepidoptera
- Family: Opostegidae
- Genus: Opostegoides
- Species: O. malaysiensis

Binomial name
- Opostegoides malaysiensis Davis, 1989

Species of moth

Opostegoides malaysiensis is a moth of the family Opostegidae. It was described by Donald R. Davis in 1989. It is known from western Malaysia.

The length of forewings is about 2.7 mm. Adults have been recorded in late August. There is one generation per year.

== Etymology ==
The species name is derived from the country of origin (Malaysia) plus the Latin suffix ensis (denoting place, locality).
