= Opostegoides minodensis =

Scientific classification
- Kingdom: Animalia
- Phylum: Arthropoda
- Class: Insecta
- Order: Lepidoptera
- Family: Opostegidae
- Genus: Opostegoides
- Species: O. minodensis

Binomial name
- Opostegoides minodensis (Kuroko, 1982)

Synonyms
- Opostega minodensis Kuroko, 1982

Species of moth

Opostegoides minodensis is a moth of the family Opostegidae. It is found in Japan.

There is probably one generation per year with adults on wing from the end of June to mid-July.

The larvae feed on Betula platyphylla var. japonica.
