= Opostega granifera =

Scientific classification
- Kingdom: Animalia
- Phylum: Arthropoda
- Class: Insecta
- Order: Lepidoptera
- Family: Opostegidae
- Genus: Opostega
- Species: O. granifera

Binomial name
- Opostega granifera Meyrick, 1913

Species of moth

Opostega granifera is a moth of the family Opostegidae. It was described by Edward Meyrick in 1913. It is known from the area of the former Transvaal Province in South Africa.

Adults have been recorded in December.
