= Opostega cretatella =

Scientific classification
- Kingdom: Animalia
- Phylum: Arthropoda
- Class: Insecta
- Order: Lepidoptera
- Family: Opostegidae
- Genus: Opostega
- Species: O. cretatella

Binomial name
- Opostega cretatella Chrétien, 1915

Species of moth

Opostega cretatella is a moth of the family Opostegidae. It was described by Pierre Chrétien in 1915. It is known from Algeria.

Adults have been recorded in April.
