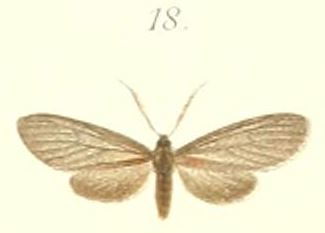
- Machairophora fumigata

Scientific classification
- Kingdom: Animalia
- Phylum: Arthropoda
- Class: Insecta
- Order: Lepidoptera
- Superfamily: Noctuoidea
- Family: Erebidae
- Subfamily: Arctiinae
- Tribe: Lithosiini
- Genus: Machairophora; Hampson, 1893

Type species
- Machairophora fulvipuncta Hampson, 1893

Synonyms
- Machaerophora Hampson, 1900

= Machairophora =

Genus of moths

Machairophora is a genus of moths in the subfamily Arctiinae first described by George Hampson in 1893. Two species are included, which are found from Sri Lanka and Papua New Guinea only.

== Description ==
In male, antennae bipectinate (comb like on both sides) with short branches. Fore tibia with a short curved spine. Mid and hind tibia with long terminal spur pairs. Wings are covered with scales and hair. In forewings, veins 7 to 9 stalked, vein 11 arising from vein 10, then anastomosing (fusing) with vein 12. Hindwings with stalked veins 3 and 4, where the veins 6 and 7 on a very long stalk. Vein 8 from near end of cell.

== Species ==
- Machairophora fulvipuncta Hampson, 1893 (Sri Lanka)
- Machairophora fumigata Pagenstecher, 1900 (Papua New Guinea)
