= Opostegoides epistolaris =

Scientific classification
- Kingdom: Animalia
- Phylum: Arthropoda
- Class: Insecta
- Order: Lepidoptera
- Family: Opostegidae
- Genus: Opostegoides
- Species: O. epistolaris

Binomial name
- Opostegoides epistolaris (Meyrick, 1911)

Synonyms
- Opostega epistolaris Meyrick, 1911

Species of moth

Opostegoides epistolaris is a moth of the family Opostegidae. It was described by Edward Meyrick in 1911. It is known from Mysore in India.

Adults have been recorded in May.
