= Opostega idiocoma =

Scientific classification
- Kingdom: Animalia
- Phylum: Arthropoda
- Class: Insecta
- Order: Lepidoptera
- Family: Opostegidae
- Genus: Opostega
- Species: O. idiocoma

Binomial name
- Opostega idiocoma Meyrick, 1918

Species of moth

Opostega idiocoma is a moth of the family Opostegidae. It was described by Edward Meyrick in 1918. It is known from Natal in South Africa.

Adults have been recorded in January.
