= Opostega tincta =

Scientific classification
- Kingdom: Animalia
- Phylum: Arthropoda
- Class: Insecta
- Order: Lepidoptera
- Family: Opostegidae
- Genus: Opostega
- Species: O. tincta

Binomial name
- Opostega tincta Meyrick, 1918

Species of moth

Opostega tincta is a moth of the family Opostegidae. It was described by Edward Meyrick in 1918. It is known from Natal, South Africa.
