= Opostega arthrota =

Scientific classification
- Kingdom: Animalia
- Phylum: Arthropoda
- Class: Insecta
- Order: Lepidoptera
- Family: Opostegidae
- Genus: Opostega
- Species: O. arthrota

Binomial name
- Opostega arthrota Meyrick, 1915

Species of moth

Opostega arthrota is a moth of the family Opostegidae. It was described by Edward Meyrick in 1915. It is known from Queensland in Australia.

Adults have been recorded in October.
