= Opostegoides menthinella =

Scientific classification
- Domain: Eukaryota
- Kingdom: Animalia
- Phylum: Arthropoda
- Class: Insecta
- Order: Lepidoptera
- Family: Opostegidae
- Genus: Opostegoides
- Species: O. menthinella

Binomial name
- Opostegoides menthinella (Mann, 1855)

Synonyms
- Opostega snelleni Nolcken, 1882

Species of moth

Opostegoides menthinella is a moth of the family Opostegidae. It was described from Corsica, and is also known from Spain, mainland France, Sardinia, Greece and Tunisia. It has been recorded from Portugal for the first time in 2010.

The larvae possibly feed on Cistus species.
