= Garuda Indonesian Airways Flight 892 =

1968 aviation accident in India

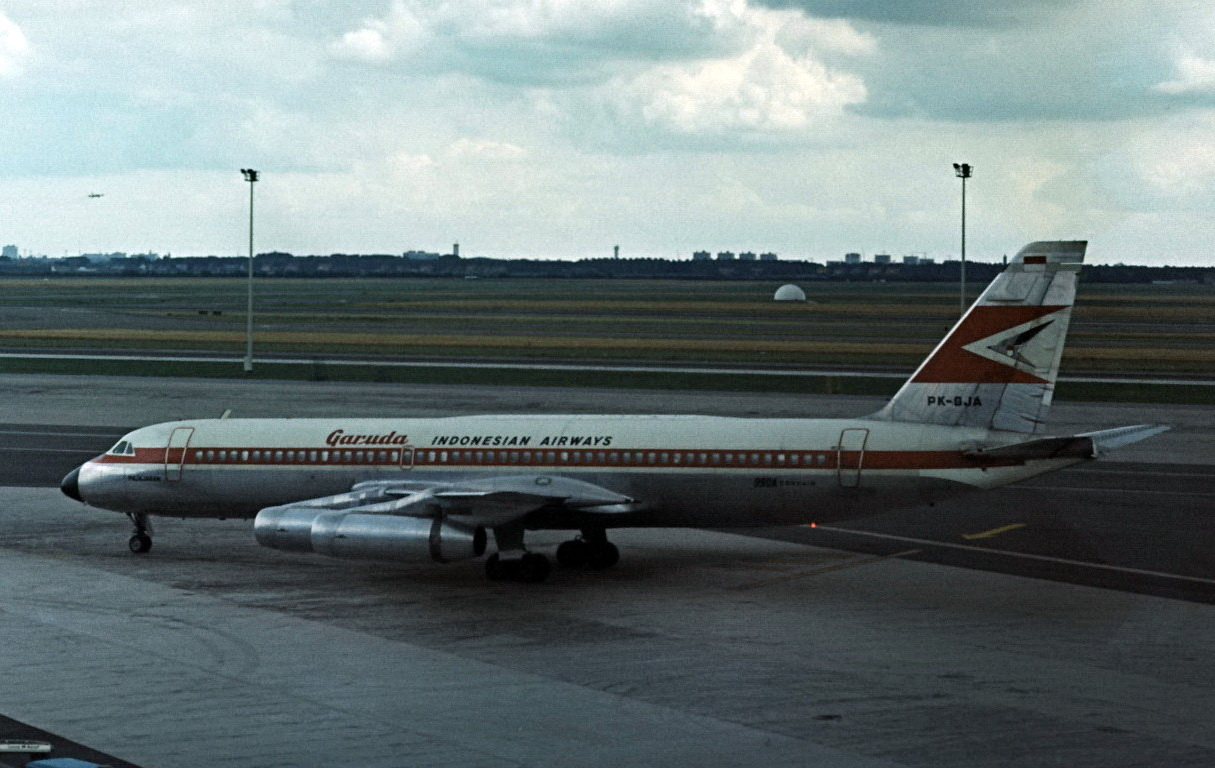
- PK-GJA, the aircraft involved in the accident

Accident
- Date: 28 May 1968
- Summary: Crashed during the climb-out after take-off, cause unknown
- Site: Bilalpada village near Nala Sopara, India
- Total fatalities: 30
- Total injuries: 17

Aircraft
- Aircraft type: Convair CV-990-30A-5
- Aircraft name: Pajajaran
- Operator: Garuda Indonesian Airways
- IATA flight No.: GA892
- ICAO flight No.: GIA892
- Call sign: GARUDA 892
- Registration: PK-GJA
- Flight origin: Kemayoran International Airport, Jakarta, Indonesia
- 1st stopover: Singapore International Airport, Singapore
- 2nd stopover: Bangkok International Airport, Bangkok, Thailand
- 3rd stopover: Santa Cruz Airport, Bombay, India
- 4th stopover: Karachi International Airport, Karachi, Pakistan
- 5th stopover: Cairo International Airport, Cairo, United Arab Republic
- Last stopover: Leonardo da Vinci–Fiumicino Airport, Rome, Italy
- Destination: Amsterdam Airport Schiphol, Amsterdam, Netherlands
- Occupants: 29
- Passengers: 15
- Crew: 14
- Fatalities: 29
- Survivors: 0

Ground casualties
- Ground fatalities: 1
- Ground injuries: 17

On 28 May 1968, Garuda Indonesian Airways Flight 892, a scheduled international passenger flight from Jakarta to Amsterdam with stopovers in Singapore, Bangkok, Bombay, Karachi, Cairo, and Rome, crashed during the climb-out after take-off from Santa Cruz Airport for the flight's Bombay to Karachi leg. The Convair 990A jet airliner operating the flight went down at Bilalpada village near Nala Sopara, killing all 29 people on board and one person on the ground.

== Flight history ==
Flight 892 arrived at Santa Cruz Airport (now Chhatrapati Shivaji Maharaj International Airport) in Bombay (now Mumbai) at 1:45 a.m. local time (8:15 p.m. UTC 27 May). Having originated from Jakarta at 6:00 p.m. local time (11:00 a.m. UTC) the previous evening with preceding stopovers in Singapore and Bangkok, the flight was the Jakarta to Amsterdam milk run service operated by Garuda Indonesian Airways (now Garuda Indonesia), which included stopovers in Singapore, Bangkok, Bombay, Karachi, Cairo, and Rome.

The stopover in Bombay was to offload and pick up passengers, change the operating crew, and refuel the aircraft before proceeding with the flight's next leg to Karachi and onwards until the final destination in Amsterdam. Eleven passengers were supposed to board the flight in Bombay, but a last-minute cancellation by five passengers reduced the number to six. Weather conditions were normal at Santa Cruz Airport at the time of the flight's departure from Bombay, with 15 passengers and 14 crew on board.

=== Accident ===
The aircraft took off from Santa Cruz Airport at 2:32 a.m. local time (9:02 p.m. UTC 27 May). About seven minutes later, the air traffic control at Santa Cruz Airport lost contact with the aircraft. The area control centre in Karachi, which had been in contact as the aircraft departed from Bombay, reported that they also lost contact with the aircraft. No distress calls were received before contact with the aircraft was lost.

The aircraft was then reported to have crashed about five minutes after the contact was lost, with the approximate crash site location to the east of Nalla Sopara railway station at the village of Bilalpada. The resultant explosion as the aircraft crashed into the ground carved a 20-foot-deep (6.1 m) crater at the crash site, and the aircraft's debris was strewn over an open area of almost three square miles (7.8 km^{2}) wide.

All 29 people on board the aircraft died in the crash that marked the first fatal accident involving a Convair 990, as well as the type's second hull loss. Seventeen people at Bilalpada village were injured, including two in serious condition. Three people had to get hospitalised; one was later pronounced dead. Besides human casualties, the crash also destroyed four huts and a school shed. Moreover, some of the burning debris from the aircraft hit and set ablaze a stable, killing 19 buffaloes.

== Aircraft ==
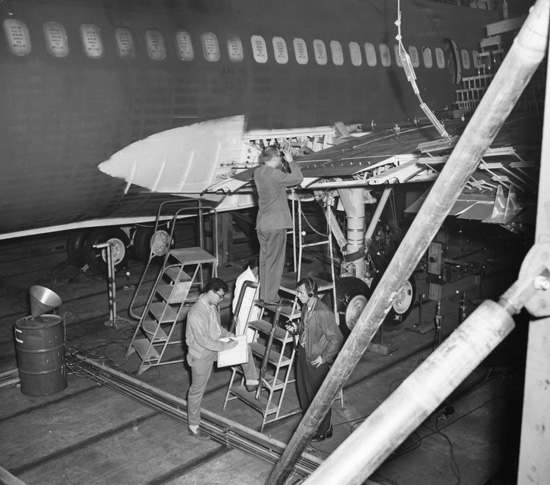
The same aircraft was seen during a proof load test in 1961.

The aircraft involved in the accident was a Convair 990A jet airliner powered by four General Electric CJ805-23B turbofan engines with registration PK-GJA. The 1960-built aircraft had serial number 30-10-3 and was initially allocated to American Airlines. Formerly used as a static experimental aircraft for Convair 990 type certification, the aircraft was converted to the Convair 990A variant afterwards. Garuda Indonesian Airways accepted the aircraft on 24 January 1964 as the last of three on order, with an airworthiness certificate valid through 30 January 1969. The 99-seater passenger aircraft was named Pajajaran after the capital city of the Sunda Kingdom.

During its service, the aircraft became the first Garuda Indonesian Airways aircraft to fly to Europe, when it came to Amsterdam as a non-scheduled flight on 30 June 1964. When the airline inaugurated its first scheduled flight to Amsterdam on 29 March 1965, the same aircraft was again used. On 17 September 1966, the aircraft was involved in a ground incident at Amsterdam Airport Schiphol, which resulted in a broken nose cone. The aircraft was repaired and returned to service until it last logged about 8,900 airframe hours. Lloyd's of London insured the aircraft for US$5,000,000 (equivalent to US$46,291,866 in 2025).

== Crew ==
A total of 14 crew members, all from Indonesia, were on board the flight. Ten were the operating crew, consisting of four cockpit crew and six cabin crew, while the remaining four were deadheading crew. The cockpit crew members were pilot-in-command Captain Abdul Rochim, co-pilot Captain Rudy Suhardono Harsono, Flight Navigator R. Henk Kusumo Asmoro, and Flight Engineer Slamet Djumadi. The pilot-in-command joined the airline upon graduating from Air Service Training in 1954 and had clocked 11,392 flight hours. Of the cabin crew members, the chief purser was the youngest sibling of A. Y. Mokoginta, the then-Indonesian Ambassador to the United Arab Republic (now Egypt).

All ten operating crew members were in Bombay after working on a flight that arrived there days earlier. They were then due to be on duty on a flight returning to Jakarta on 27 May. However, prolonged delays with the Jakarta-bound flight resulted in their reassignment to Flight 892 for the legs between Bombay and Cairo. The four deadheading crew members, on the other hand, boarded the flight in Jakarta and would remain on board until Karachi.

== Passengers ==
There were 15 passengers on board Flight 892's Bombay to Karachi leg. Of the departure cities, six passengers boarded the flight in Jakarta, three in Bangkok, and six in Bombay. Of the destination cities, six passengers would disembark the flight in Karachi, two each in Cairo and Rome, and five in Amsterdam. Six passengers were from Indonesia, four from Pakistan, two from Greece, and one each was from India, Japan, and the Netherlands.

Among the passengers from Indonesia was an official of Indonesia's National Atomic Energy Agency, whose husband was G. A. Siwabessy, Indonesia's Minister of Health at the time. Another passenger was an Indonesian Navy officer who also served as an aide-de-camp for R. Soebijakto, the First Deputy of Indonesia's Department of Defence and Security. Two employees of the airline were travelling as passengers on board the flight. The sole passenger from India was the president of the Institution of Engineers (India), who was also the vice-president of the International Federation for Pre-stressed Concrete. The sole passenger from Japan was a section chief at Dai-ichi Life. In addition, the sole passenger from the Netherlands was a leading figure in Moral Re-Armament.

== Aftermath ==
The day following the accident, Garuda Indonesian Airways grounded the remaining two Convair 990A aircraft in its fleet and suspended the Jakarta to Amsterdam and vice versa milk run service. The latter would later resume using the Douglas DC-8 on lease from KLM. The two Convair 990A aircraft were relegated to operating Indonesian domestic and Asian international routes until the airline phased out the type in 1973.

The Government of Indonesia assisted in repatriating the remains of all Indonesian victims of the accident. Inside each coffin of the Indonesian victims, stones collected from the crash site were also placed. Most of the victims were interred in public cemeteries, while the wife of the health minister, the Navy officer, and nine of the 14 crew members were interred at Kalibata Heroes' Cemetery.

Garuda Indonesian Airways stated that the next-of-kin of Indonesian passengers whose tickets for the flight were issued in Indonesia were entitled to compensation under the Warsaw Convention, which was US$8,300 (equivalent to US$76,844 in 2025) per passenger, and insurance of Rp 50,000 (equivalent to Rp11,128,738 in 2025). For the next-of-kin of the Indian passenger, a Bombay High Court report noted the airline also paid a compensation of ₹50,000 (equivalent to ₹462,919 in 2025).

In 1969, the Institution of Engineers (India) established an engineering paper memorial prize named after the late president. A year later, an Indonesian orchid breeder registered a new Dendrobium hybridisation named after the late wife of the health minister.

== Investigation ==
In the hours after the accident, representatives from the Directorate General of Civil Aviation (India) visited the crash site and conducted a preliminary investigation. A joint team from Indonesia, which included representatives from the Directorate of Civil Aviation (Indonesia) and Garuda Indonesian Airways, was also despatched to Bombay to join the investigation. Led by Karno Barkah of the Directorate of Civil Aviation (Indonesia), the team arrived in Bombay the following day.

During the search and recovery process, several pieces of debris from the aircraft were found at the top of a 60-foot-high (18 m) tree, with one side of its foliage scorched. A few days later, the search team found two of the aircraft's four engines. The two badly damaged engines, which were found at an approximate depth of 2 metres (6.6 ft), were from the starboard wing of the aircraft. Meanwhile, the two engines on the port wing were presumed to have been destroyed. Besides the engines, the search team also found debris of the remaining fuselage and belongings of the crew and the passengers. The search ended after 19 days, during which the aircraft's flight recorder had never been found.

The cause of the accident remains unknown to date, although there was an official court of inquiry in India to determine it. The court of inquiry was chaired by Y. S. Tambe, a retired Chief Justice of the Bombay High Court, with accredited representatives from the governments of India, Indonesia, and the United States, and the accident report was reportedly expected in January 1970.

However, a source citing the investigation noted that the jet airliner was presumed to have been refuelled with avgas instead of kerosene-based avtur during the stopover in Bombay. The misfuelling was alleged to have caused all of the aircraft's four engines to suffer a partial or total failure during the climb-out, causing the pilots to lose control of the aircraft. The aircraft then entered a nosedive until it crashed in an almost vertical attitude.

== See also ==
- List of Garuda Indonesia accidents and incidents
