= Loftleiðir Flight 001 =

1978 aviation accident in Sri Lanka

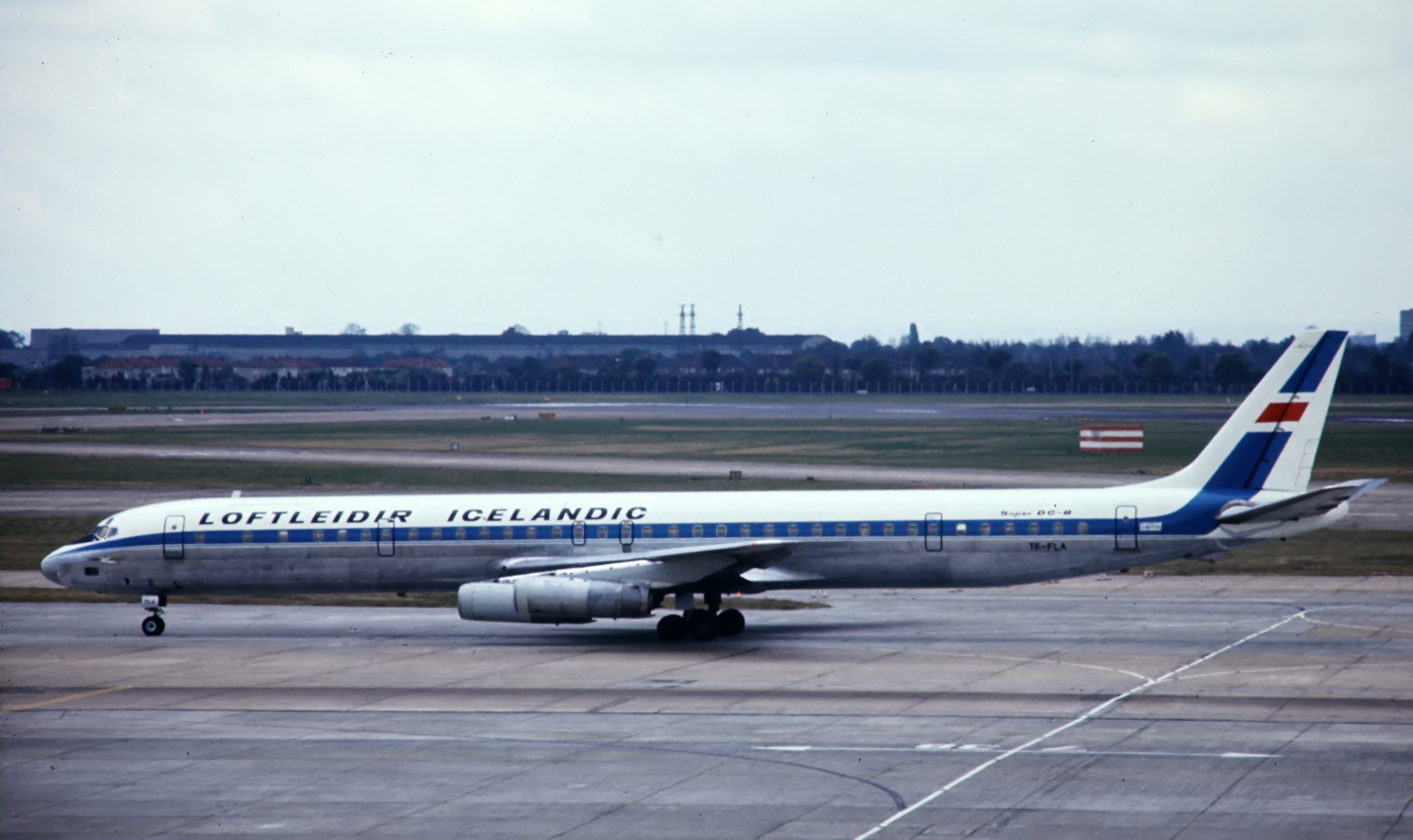
- TF-FLA, the aircraft involved in the accident, pictured in 1976

Accident
- Date: 15 November 1978
- Summary: Controlled flight into terrain caused by faulty airport equipment along with crew and ATC error
- Site: Katunayake, Sri Lanka; 7°12′33″N 79°54′8″E

Aircraft
- Aircraft type: Douglas DC-8-63CF
- Aircraft name: Leifur Eiríksson
- Operator: Loftleiðir on behalf of Garuda Indonesian Airways
- IATA flight No.: LL001
- Call sign: LIMA LIMA 001
- Registration: TF-FLA
- Flight origin: Kandara Airport, Jeddah, Saudi Arabia
- Stopover: Bandaranaike International Airport, Colombo, Sri Lanka
- Destination: Juanda International Airport, Surabaya, Indonesia
- Occupants: 262
- Passengers: 249
- Crew: 13
- Fatalities: 183
- Injuries: 75
- Survivors: 79

Loftleiðir Flight 001 was a Hajj charter flight operated by a Douglas DC-8 which crashed on approach to Colombo, Sri Lanka, on 15 November 1978. The crash killed 183 out of 262 passengers and crew members. The official report by Sri Lankan authorities determined the probable cause of the crash to be the failure of the crew to conform to approach procedures; however, American and Icelandic authorities claimed faulty equipment at the airport and air traffic control errors as the reasons for the crash. It was the second-deadliest aviation accident in 1978, behind Air India Flight 855.

With 183 fatalities, the crash of Flight 001 is the deadliest crash involving an Icelandic airline and the second deadliest in Sri Lankan aviation history after Martinair Flight 138, (also a DC-8 chartered by Garuda) that had crashed four years earlier.

== Aircraft ==
The aircraft involved in the accident was a Douglas DC-8-63CF named Leifur Eiríksson and registration TF-FLA, operated by Loftleiðir. At the time of the accident, the aircraft was operating Hajj charter flights for Garuda Indonesian Airways.

== Accident ==
Flight 001 departed Jeddah for Surabaya with a stop at Bandaranaike International Airport in Colombo for refueling and crew rotation. There were 249 passengers, most of whom were Indonesian Hajj pilgrims from South Kalimantan returning home, and 13 Icelandic crew members. Thunderstorms were in the area, and wind shear was an issue. At 22:53:24 local time, the control center informed the aircraft's crew that they would be landing on runway 04. In response, the crew requested a landing on runway 22. The controller approved the request and gave instructions for an ILS landing on runway 22. The aircraft then descended to flight level (FL) 220, reaching that height around 140 km (90 mi) from the airport.

At 23:06:32 local time, the crew contacted the airport's radar control center, which cleared the flight to descend to an altitude of 610 metres (2,000 ft) and then follow control's instructions to perform an approach for landing on runway 22. The dispatcher also gave the crew instructions to report when they had reached the radio beacon, which the crew acknowledged receiving but did not confirm. The radar controller periodically transmitted distance and altitude data to the aircraft. The last radio message from the controller was given at 23:27:26: "Lima, Lima 001, slightly to the left of center line, very slightly to the left of center line, 3.2 kilometres (2 mi) from touch-down, height 200 metres (650 ft), cleared to land off this approach." At 23:27:37, the crew replied, "Roger."

When the approach controller subsequently acquired a visual on Flight 001, the aircraft was descending dangerously towards the ground. The controller warned the flight, "Lima, Lima 001, you are undershooting." However, the crew was then speaking with the radar controller on another frequency, and so they did not receive the advisory. The approach controller then lost sight of the DC-8, after which he saw an explosion. At 23:28:03, the DC-8 crashed into a rubber and coconut plantation and exploded. The left wing tip struck the coconut trees first, breaking them apart. The aircraft then banked 40 degrees to port and impacted the ground, virtually disintegrating the forward fuselage. The remaining fuselage was cartwheeled out of control and split up into six pieces, coming to a stop 146 metres (478 ft) past the initial point of impact. The crash site was located 2.1463 kilometres (1.1589 nmi) from runway 22 and 31.44 metres (103.15 ft) off the right side of the runway's extended center line. As the first witness to the crash, the approach controller immediately informed his colleagues of the accident.

Within half an hour, five fire trucks arrived at the crash site. The rescue operation was hampered by the presence of many coconut palm trees, which prevented access to many large pieces of equipment. One of the rescue team members was the acting head of Sri Lanka's civil aviation authority. While assisting in the rescue, he managed to document the instrument readings and take photographs necessary for the investigation.

A total of 183 people were killed in the crash: eight crew members and 175 passengers. Survivors totaled 79: 32 people (four crew members and 28 passengers) received non-fatal injuries, while 47 people (one crew member and 46 passengers) were uninjured.

== See also ==
- Martinair Flight 138
- Turkish Airlines Flight 6491
