= Martinair Flight 138 =

1974 aviation accident in Sri Lanka

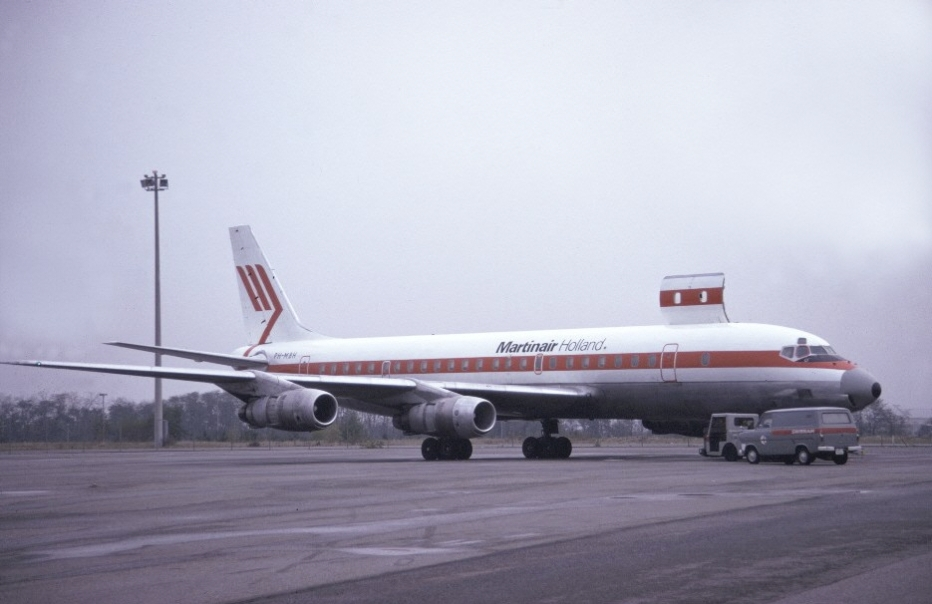
- PH-MBH, the aircraft involved in the accident, seen in November 1974

Accident
- Date: 4 December 1974
- Summary: Controlled flight into terrain due to pilot error
- Site: Maskeliya, Sri Lanka; 6°53′32″N 80°29′26″E

Aircraft
- Aircraft type: Douglas DC-8-55CF
- Operator: Martinair on behalf of Garuda Indonesian Airways
- IATA flight No.: MP138
- ICAO flight No.: MPH138
- Call sign: MARTINAIR 138
- Registration: PH-MBH
- Flight origin: Juanda International Airport, Surabaya, Indonesia
- Stopover: Bandaranaike International Airport, Colombo, Sri Lanka
- Destination: Kandara Airport, Jeddah, Saudi Arabia
- Occupants: 191
- Passengers: 182
- Crew: 9
- Fatalities: 191
- Survivors: 0

Martinair Flight 138 was a charter flight of Martinair from Surabaya to Jeddah with a stopover in Colombo. On 4 December 1974, the Douglas DC-8 operating the flight crashed into a mountain in Sri Lanka shortly before landing, killing all 191 people aboard – 182 passengers, all of whom were Indonesian Hajj pilgrims, and nine crew members. The crash remains the deadliest in Sri Lankan aviation history and the third-deadliest involving a DC-8, after Arrow Air Flight 1285R and Nigeria Airways Flight 2120. At the time of the crash, it was the second-deadliest aviation accident in history, after the crash of Turkish Airlines Flight 981 which occurred earlier that same year.

Flight 138 departed Surabaya for Jeddah via Colombo at approximately 12.03 UTC. At around 16.30, UTC air traffic control in Colombo cleared the flight. At 16.38 UTC another air traffic controller is said to have intervened, cleared the flight down to 5,000 ft (1,500 m) and reported clearing to 8,000 ft (2,400 m). Colombo approach then cleared the flight down to 2,000 ft (610 m) at 16.44 and told the flight to expect a runway 04 approach. The crew aboard Flight 138 were then asked to report when the airport was in sight. The crew then continued their descent until the aircraft crashed into Saptha Kanya mountain range at an altitude of approximately 4,355 ft (1,327 m), around 40 nmi (74 km; 46 mi) east of Colombo.

== Aircraft and crew ==
The aircraft was a Douglas DC-8-55CF built in 1966. The aircraft was bought by Martinair Holland N.V. on 21 September 1973 and registered in the Netherlands as PH-MBH under Registration No. 2064 on 21 September 1973. The Certificate of Airworthiness was last renewed in the transport category on 7 November 1974 and was valid until 14 December 1975. The aircraft had flown a total number of 35,613 hours of which 3,347 hours had been with Martinair It was equipped with four Pratt & Whitney JT3D-3B engines which were modified by KLM. The aircraft was owned by Martinair, which at the time was operating Hajj charter flights for Garuda Indonesian Airways.

The crew of Flight 138 was Captain Hendrik Lamme, First Officer Robert Blomsma, Flight Engineer Johannes Wijnands, Purser Ingrid van der Vliet and Flight Attendants Henrietta Borghols, Abdul Hamid Usman, Lilik Herawati, Titia van Dijkum, and Hendrika van Hamburg.

== Location ==
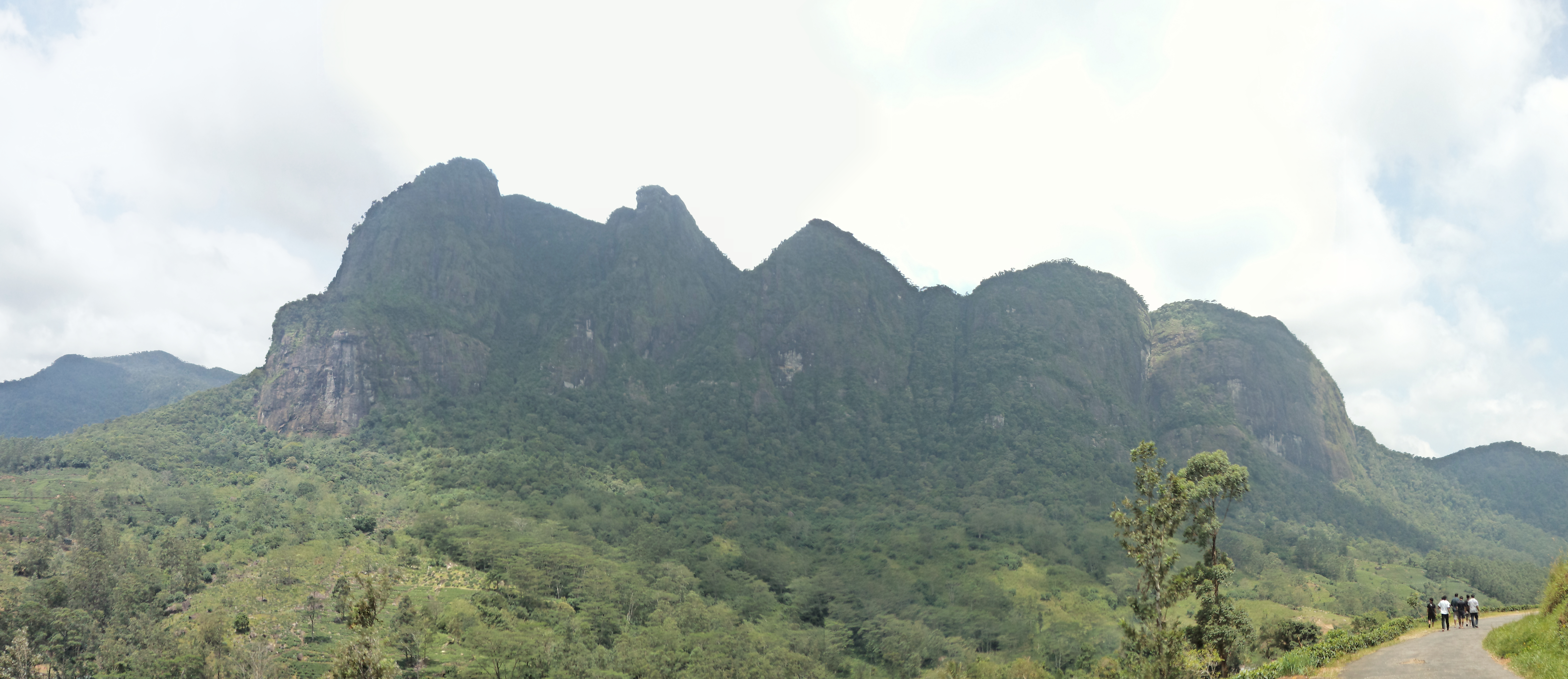
A panoramic view of Saptha Kanya mountain range.

The aircraft crashed on the fifth mountain of Saptha Kanya mountain range at Therberton estate, Maskeliya, Sri Lanka. It crashed at around 40 nautical miles from Bandaranaike International Airport, Katunayake.

== Cause ==
Investigators listed the cause of the accident to be a "collision with rising terrain as the crew descended the aircraft below safe altitude owing to incorrect identification of their position vis-a-vis the airport. The investigation is of the opinion that this was the result of dependence on Doppler and Weather Radar Systems on board PH-MBH which left room for misinterpretation."

== Events leading to the accident ==
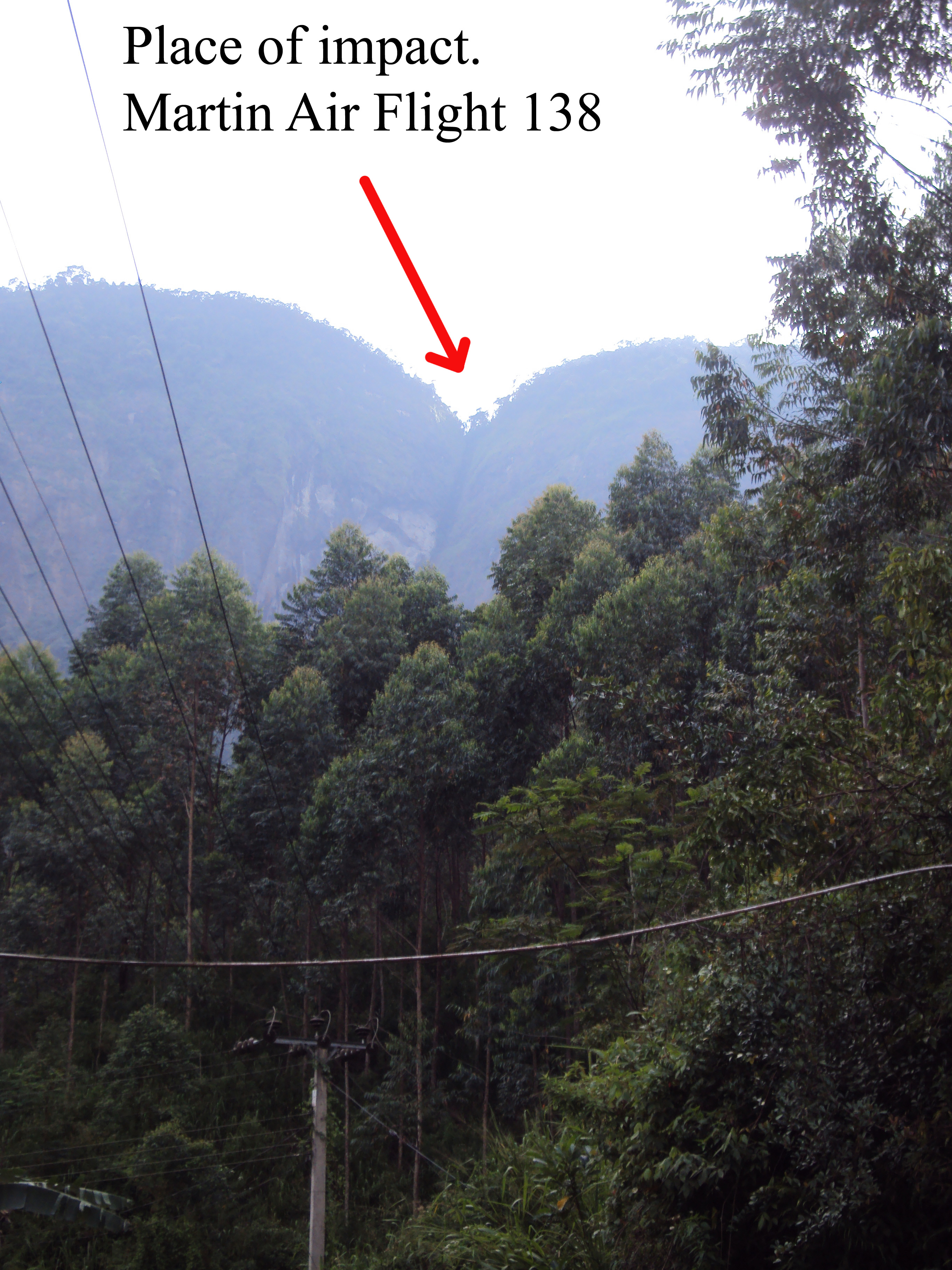
The crash site according to villagers.

The aircraft took off from Juanda International Airport in Surabaya at approximately 12:03 UTC (19:03 local) for a flight to Jeddah, Saudi Arabia, with a stopover at Bandaranaike International Airport in Colombo, Sri Lanka. The aircraft contacted Katunayaka approach control at around 16:16 UTC (21:30 local) indicating that they were 130 miles (113 nmi; 209 km) away and so approach reported the weather conditions and requested the aircraft to change over to Colombo area control for a descent clearance.

The aircraft then descended from 35,000 feet (11,000 m) and was handed back over to approach control. Approach control then cleared the aircraft down to 2,000 feet (610 m) and the flight crew was required to report back if they sighted the airfield or if their position was overhead the 'Katunayake Non-Directional Beacon'. This message was acknowledged by the crew but there was no further communication with the aircraft. Eyewitnesses stated that the plane was flying at a level below normal and there was no evidence of a fire on board and all the engines sounded normal with no malfunctions evident. The sound of the aircraft exploding on impact was heard clearly by residents close to the site of the crash.

It was later discovered that the aircraft had crashed into the fifth mountain.

Repeated attempts to make contact with the aircraft from approach control met with no success and in consultation with Colombo area control the distress phase was initiated. Search and rescue operations began subsequently. The country of registry of the aircraft (The Netherlands) and the country of manufacture (USA) were informed. Indonesia was also informed of the accident as many of the passengers were nationals of that country.

== Memorial ==
A small memorial has been built in the town of Norton Bridge, which is several miles from the crash site. In addition, a tire which was recovered from the crash site has been put on display to the public. The tire, even though displayed in public, remains property of the Norton Bridge Police. Sri Lankan artist Anton Jones sang about the incident in his song "DC8." A second memorial, placed by family members from Asia and Europe, has been put on the slopes below the place of accident. Approximately 30 years after the accident, Martinair added a plaquette with only eight names of the crew. At Lelystad Airport, a memorial has been placed as well. The reason for this location is unknown.

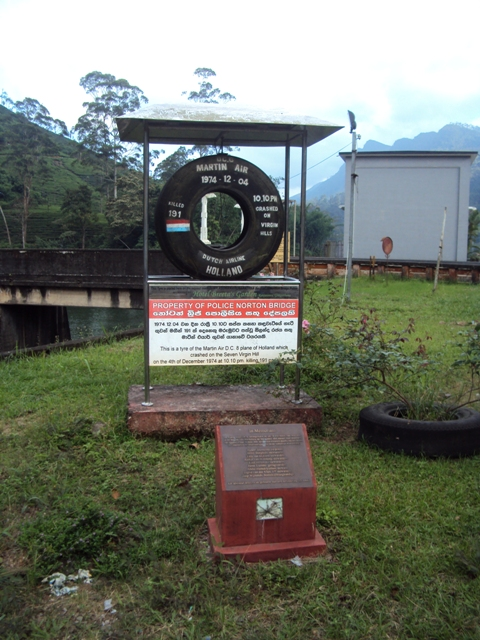
A recovered tyre and the memorial plaquette at Norton Bridge.

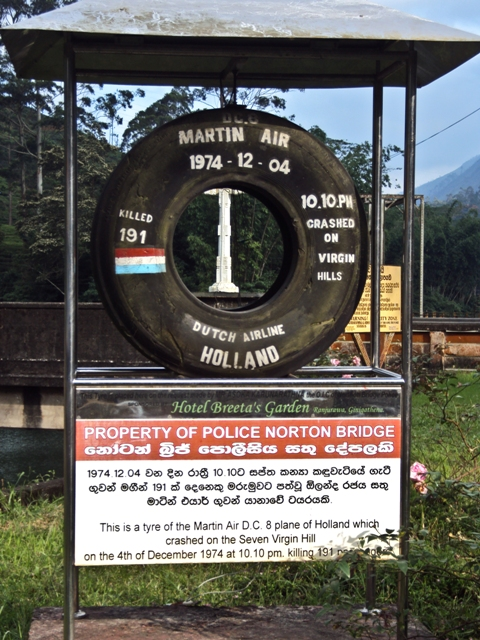
The recovered tyre.

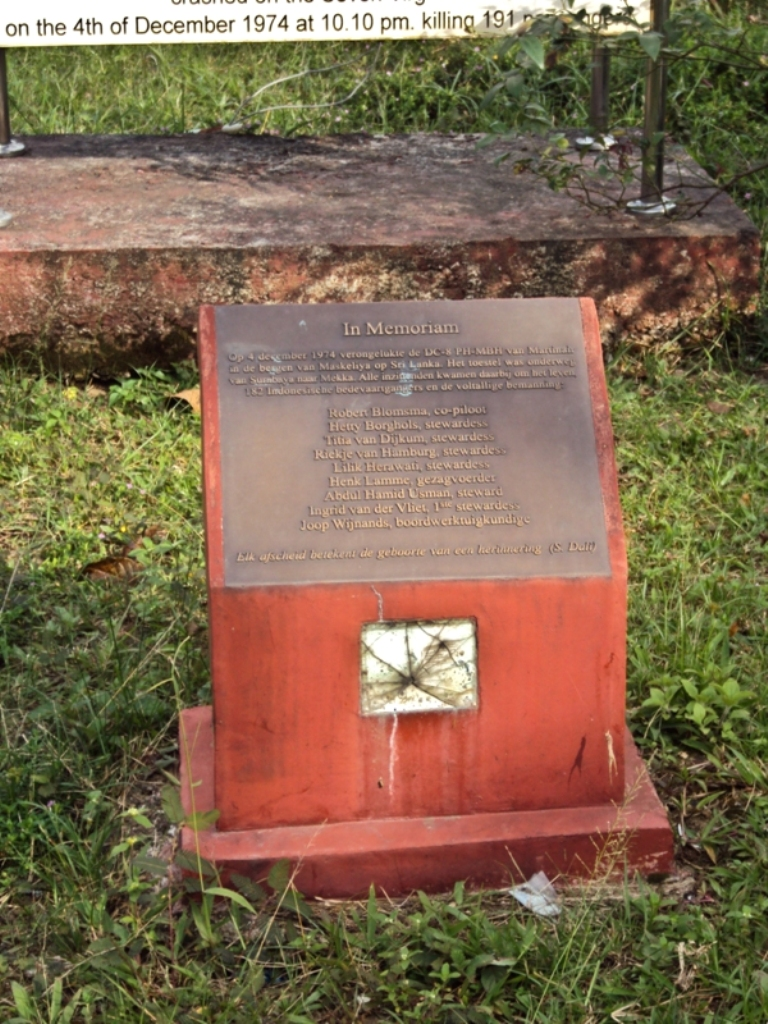
The memorial plaquette.

== See also ==
- Loftleiðir Flight 001
