= Opostega xenodoxa =

Scientific classification
- Kingdom: Animalia
- Phylum: Arthropoda
- Class: Insecta
- Order: Lepidoptera
- Family: Opostegidae
- Genus: Opostega
- Species: O. xenodoxa

Binomial name
- Opostega xenodoxa Meyrick, 1893

Species of moth

Opostega xenodoxa is a moth of the family Opostegidae. It was described by Edward Meyrick in 1893. It is known from New South Wales, Australia.
