= Opostega atypa =

Scientific classification
- Kingdom: Animalia
- Phylum: Arthropoda
- Class: Insecta
- Order: Lepidoptera
- Family: Opostegidae
- Genus: Opostega
- Species: O. atypa

Binomial name
- Opostega atypa Turner, 1923

Species of moth

Opostega atypa is a moth of the family Opostegidae. It was described by Turner in 1923. It is known from Queensland in Australia.

Adults have been recorded in July.
