= Garuda Indonesian Airways Flight 542 =

1961 aviation accident

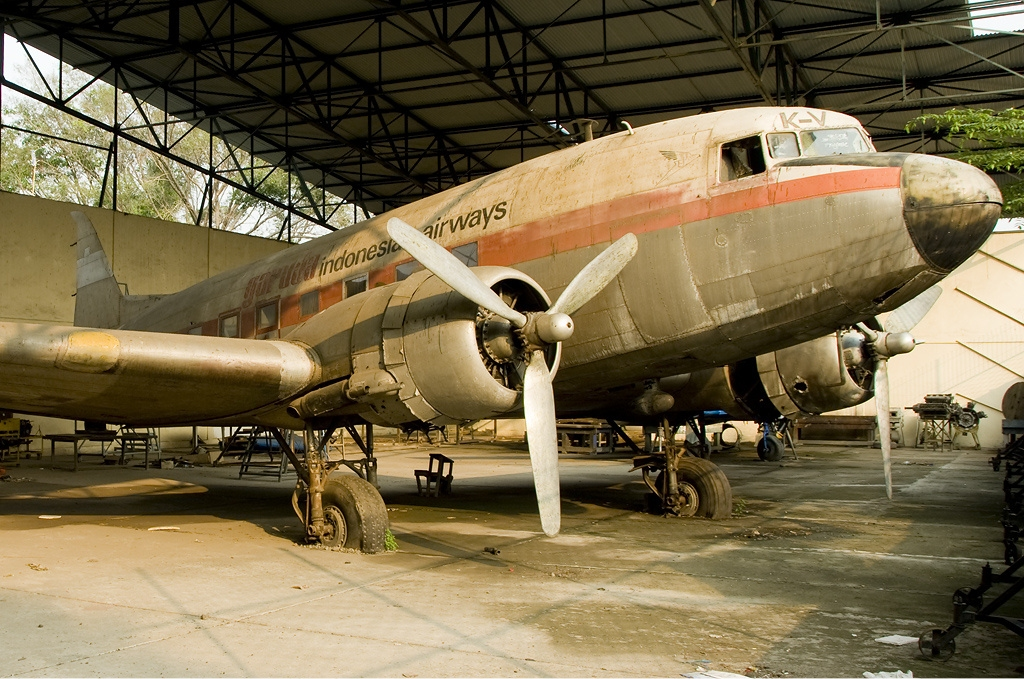
- A Garuda Indonesian Airways Douglas DC-3

Disappearance
- Date: 3 February 1961
- Summary: Missing, presumed crashed into the sea
- Site: Off Madura Island

Aircraft
- Aircraft type: Douglas DC-3
- Operator: Garuda Indonesian Airways
- Registration: PK-GDY
- Flight origin: Juanda Airport, Surabaya, Indonesia
- Destination: Sepinggan Airport, Balikpapan, Indonesia
- Occupants: 26
- Passengers: 21
- Crew: 5
- Fatalities: 26 (presumed)
- Missing: 26
- Survivors: 0 (presumed)

Garuda Indonesia Flight 542 was a scheduled passenger flight on 3 February 1961, which was reported missing en route from Surabaya to Balikpapan. All 26 occupants on board were lost in the accident.

== Flight ==
The aircraft departed Surabaya-Juanda Airport at 11:35 pm inbound for Balikpapan. While in cruising altitude, the airplane disappeared from radar screens and presumably crashed into the Java Sea. Search and rescue operations were conducted but eventually suspended after a few days, as no trace of the aircraft nor the 26 occupants was found. The crew was unable to send any distress call prior to the accident. Due to a lack of evidence, it was not possible to determine the exact cause of the accident. The wreckage was never found.

== Aftermath ==
The following day, at around noon, the flight was reported as missing. Search and rescue efforts were unsuccessful in trying to locate the wreckage.
