= Opostegoides gephyraea =

Scientific classification
- Kingdom: Animalia
- Phylum: Arthropoda
- Class: Insecta
- Order: Lepidoptera
- Family: Opostegidae
- Genus: Opostegoides
- Species: O. gephyraea

Binomial name
- Opostegoides gephyraea (Meyrick, 1881)

Synonyms
- Opostega gephyraea Meyrick, 1881

Species of moth

Opostegoides gephyraea is a moth of the family Opostegidae. It was described by Edward Meyrick in 1881. It is known from New South Wales in Australia.

Adults have been recorded in October.
