= Opostega chalinias =

Scientific classification
- Kingdom: Animalia
- Phylum: Arthropoda
- Class: Insecta
- Order: Lepidoptera
- Family: Opostegidae
- Genus: Opostega
- Species: O. chalinias

Binomial name
- Opostega chalinias Meyrick, 1893

Species of moth

Opostega chalinias is a moth of the family Opostegidae. It was described by Edward Meyrick in 1893. It is known from Tasmania in Australia.

Adults have been recorded in January.
