= Garuda Indonesian Airways Flight 424 =

1961 aviation accident

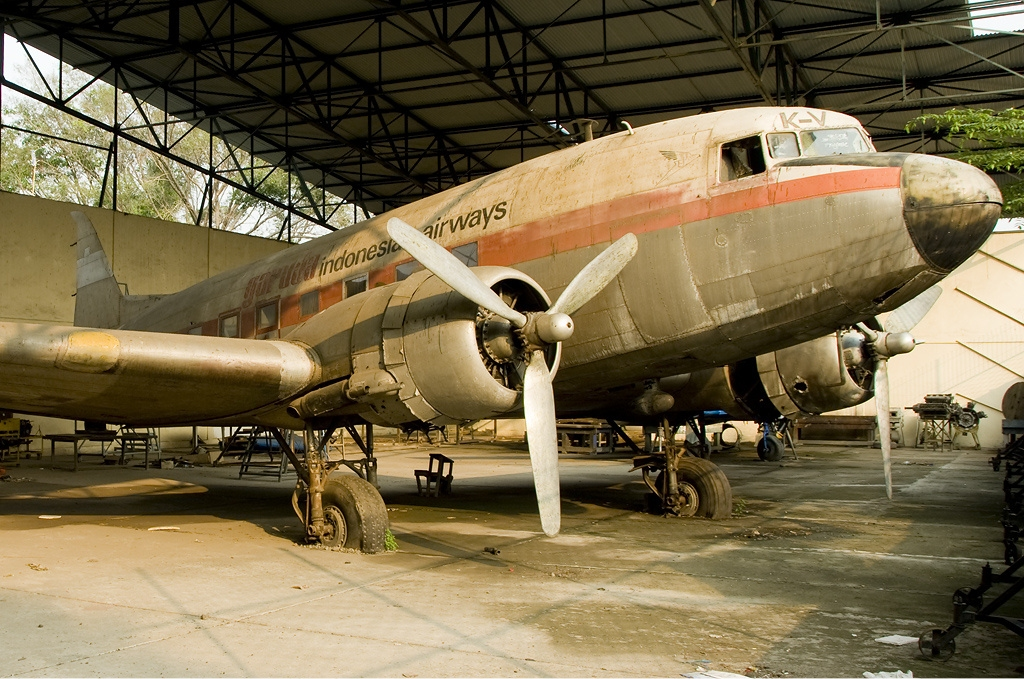
- A Garuda Indonesian Airways Douglas DC-3, similar to the accident aircraft.

Accident
- Date: January 24, 1961
- Summary: Pilot error, CFIT
- Site: Mount Burangrang, West Java

Aircraft
- Aircraft type: Douglas DC-3
- Operator: Garuda Indonesian Airways
- Registration: PK-GDI
- Flight origin: Kemayoran Airport, Jakarta, Indonesia
- 1st stopover: Husein Sastranegara Airport, Bandung, Indonesia
- Last stopover: Adisucipto Airport, Yogyakarta, Indonesia
- Destination: Juanda Airport, Surabaya, Indonesia
- Occupants: 21
- Passengers: 16
- Crew: 5
- Fatalities: 21
- Survivors: 0

Garuda Indonesian Airways Flight 424 was a scheduled passenger flight on January 24, 1961, which crashed into Mount Burangrang, 15 km (9.3 mi) north of its destination. All 21 occupants were killed.

== Flight ==
Flight 424 took off from Jakarta at 10:09 am (local time) for a flight to Surabaya with stopovers in Bandung and Yogyakarta. The plane climbed to a cruising altitude of 3,500 feet to fly below the clouds. At 10:43 am, the flight crew requested permission to climb to 9,500 feet. The plane was then instructed to contact Husein tower at 10:45 am, but the latter didn't acknowledge. A few minutes later, Flight 424 crashed into the western slope of Mount Burangrang at an altitude of 5,400 feet at approximately 10:48 am. The wreckage was found four days later on January 28. All 21 occupants were killed.

The probable cause of the accident was the attempt by the pilot to fly over mountainous terrain when unsure of his position and in weather conditions which severely restricted visibility.
