= Opostega stiriella =

Scientific classification
- Kingdom: Animalia
- Phylum: Arthropoda
- Class: Insecta
- Order: Lepidoptera
- Family: Opostegidae
- Genus: Opostega
- Species: O. stiriella

Binomial name
- Opostega stiriella Meyrick, 1881

Species of moth

Opostega stiriella is a moth of the family Opostegidae. It was described by Edward Meyrick in 1881. It is known from New South Wales, Australia.
