= Opostega orestias =

Scientific classification
- Kingdom: Animalia
- Phylum: Arthropoda
- Class: Insecta
- Order: Lepidoptera
- Family: Opostegidae
- Genus: Opostega
- Species: O. orestias

Binomial name
- Opostega orestias Meyrick, 1880

Species of moth

Opostega orestias is a moth of the family Opostegidae. It was described by Edward Meyrick in 1880. It is known from Queensland, Australia.
