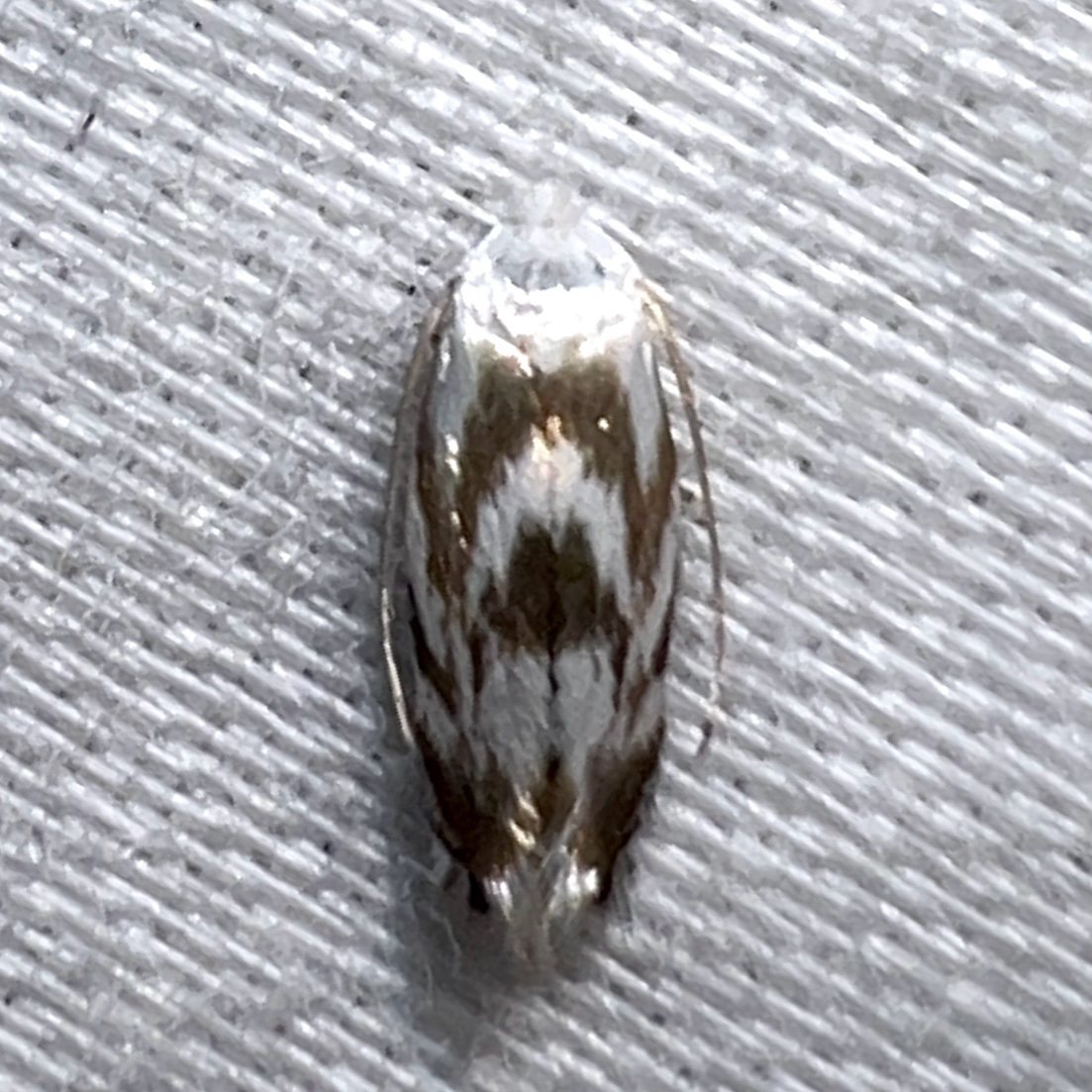

Scientific classification
- Kingdom: Animalia
- Phylum: Arthropoda
- Class: Insecta
- Order: Lepidoptera
- Family: Opostegidae
- Genus: Opostega
- Species: O. nubifera

Binomial name
- Opostega nubifera Turner, 1900

= Opostega nubifera =

Species of moth

Opostega nubifera is a species of moth in the family Opostegidae. It was first described by Turner in 1900 and is known from Queensland, Australia.
