= Opostega chalcoplethes =

Scientific classification
- Kingdom: Animalia
- Phylum: Arthropoda
- Class: Insecta
- Order: Lepidoptera
- Family: Opostegidae
- Genus: Opostega
- Species: O. chalcoplethes

Binomial name
- Opostega chalcoplethes Turner, 1923

Species of moth

Opostega chalcoplethes is a moth of the family Opostegidae. It was described by Alfred Jefferis Turner in 1923. It is known from Western Australia.
