= Maskeliya =

Maskeliya මස්කෙළිය
- Town
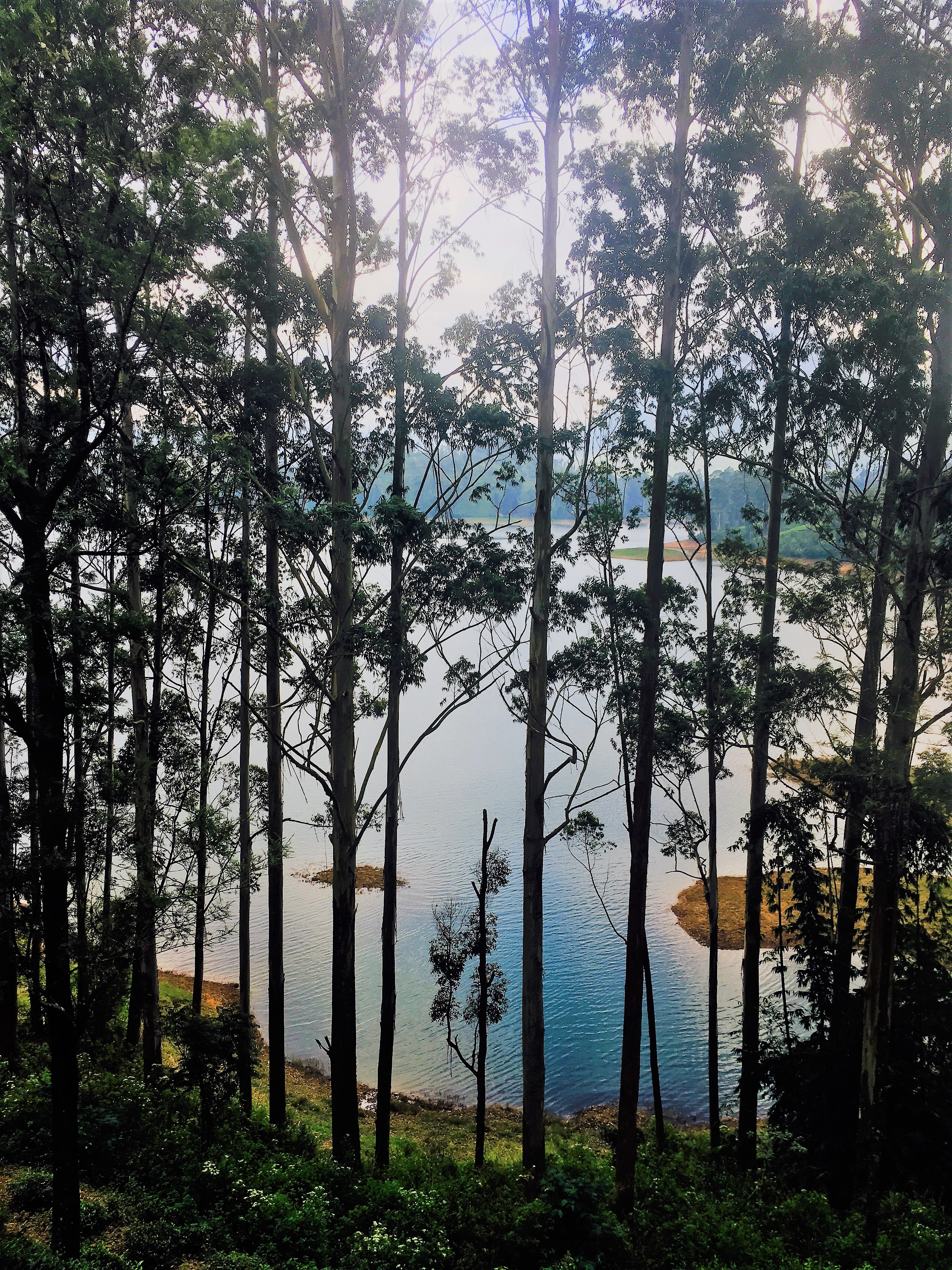
- A section of the Maskeliya Reservoir as seen from the Peak Wilderness Sanctuary

- Location within Sri Lanka
- Coordinates: 6°50′00″N 80°34′20″E
- Country: Sri Lanka
- Province: Central Province
- District: Nuwara Eliya District
- Time zone: UTC+5:30 (Sri Lanka Standard Time)

Maskeliya is a town in the Central Province of Sri Lanka. It is the site of the 1974 crash of Martinair Flight 138, the worst air disaster in Sri Lanka.

It is known for its mountains, waterfalls, unique ethnic background, and estates. The actual town is built on a combination of three estates. Despite the aircraft crash, because of Adams Peak, Maskeliya has been a popular destination in Sri Lanka.

== See also ==
- List of towns in Central Province, Sri Lanka
