= Stigmella rhomboivora =

Scientific classification
- Kingdom: Animalia
- Phylum: Arthropoda
- Class: Insecta
- Order: Lepidoptera
- Family: Nepticulidae
- Genus: Stigmella
- Species: S. rhomboivora

Binomial name
- Stigmella rhomboivora Gustafsson, 1985

Species of moth

Stigmella rhomboivora is a moth of the family Nepticulidae. It was described by Åke Gustafsson in 1985. It is found in Gambia.

The larvae feed on Triumfetta rhomboidea. They probably mine the leaves of their host plant.
