= Stigmella wollofella =

Scientific classification
- Kingdom: Animalia
- Phylum: Arthropoda
- Clade: Pancrustacea
- Class: Insecta
- Order: Lepidoptera
- Family: Nepticulidae
- Genus: Stigmella
- Species: S. wollofella

Binomial name
- Stigmella wollofella (Gustafsson, 1972)

Species of moth

Stigmella wollofella is a moth of the family Nepticulidae. It was first described by Gustafsson in 1972. It is endemic to Gambia where it was discovered in the Gambia River, which flows between Basse Santa Su and Banjul.

The larvae feed on Ziziphus mauritiana.
