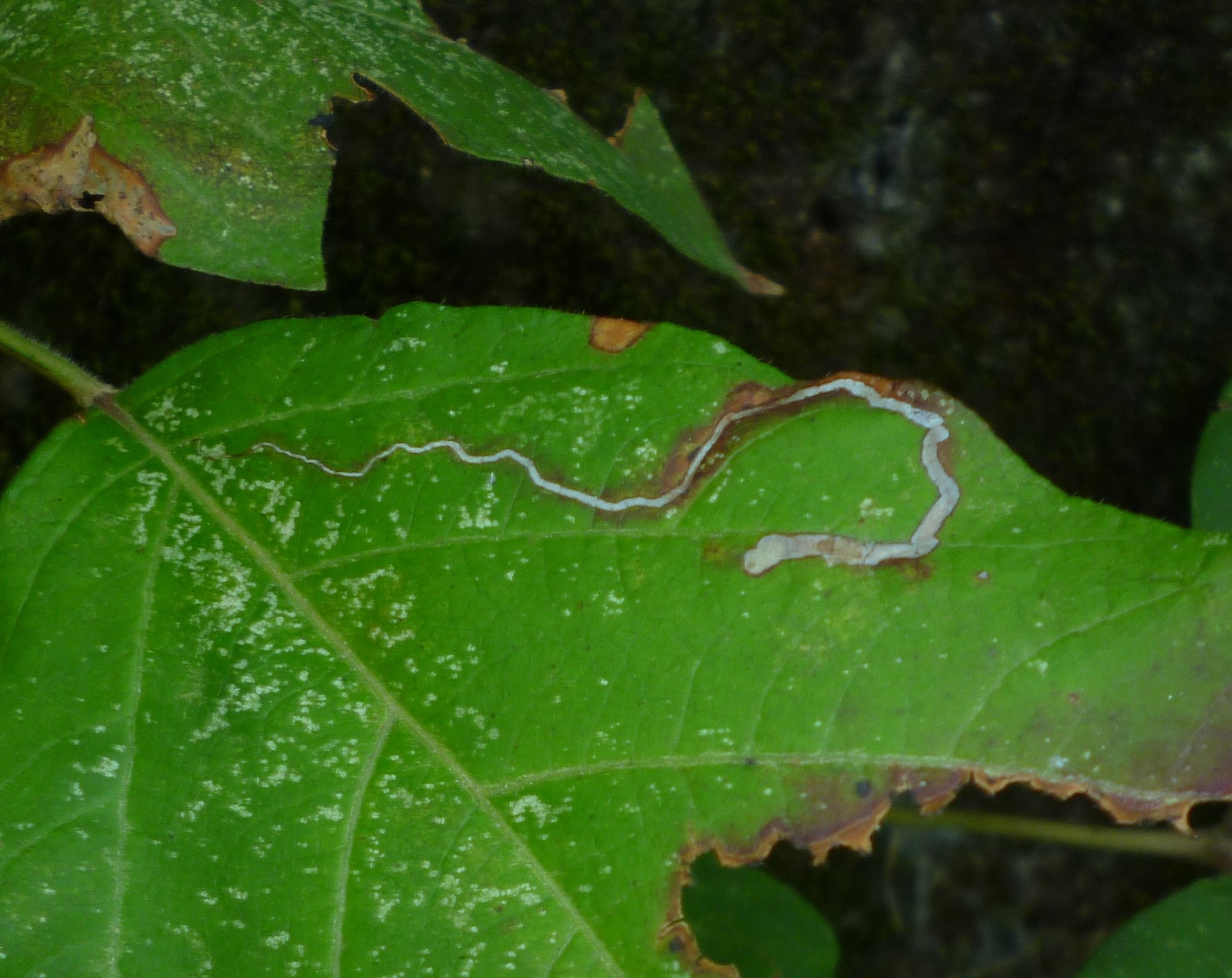
- Leaf mines caused by Stigmella rhoifoliella

Scientific classification
- Kingdom: Animalia
- Phylum: Arthropoda
- Clade: Pancrustacea
- Class: Insecta
- Order: Lepidoptera
- Family: Nepticulidae
- Genus: Stigmella
- Species: S. rhoifoliella

Binomial name
- Stigmella rhoifoliella (Braun, 1912)

Synonyms
- Nepticula rhoifoliella Braun, 1912

= Stigmella rhoifoliella =

Species of moth

Stigmella rhoifoliella is a moth of the family Nepticulidae. It is found in Ohio and Kentucky in the United States. The wingspan is 3.2–4.2 mm. Late instar larvae may be found in June, late July and September. Adults are on wing in June and particularly August. There are two to three generations per year.

The larvae feed on Rhus toxicodendron. They mine the leaves of their host plant.
