= Stigmella ficulnea =

Scientific classification
- Kingdom: Animalia
- Phylum: Arthropoda
- Clade: Pancrustacea
- Class: Insecta
- Order: Lepidoptera
- Family: Nepticulidae
- Genus: Stigmella
- Species: S. ficulnea

Binomial name
- Stigmella ficulnea Puplesis & Krasilnikova, 1994

Species of moth

Stigmella ficulnea is a moth of the family Nepticulidae. It is found in Turkmenistan.

The larvae feed on Ficus carica. They probably mine the leaves of their host.
