= Stigmella abaiella =

Scientific classification
- Kingdom: Animalia
- Phylum: Arthropoda
- Clade: Pancrustacea
- Class: Insecta
- Order: Lepidoptera
- Family: Nepticulidae
- Genus: Stigmella
- Species: S. abaiella

Binomial name
- Stigmella abaiella Klimesch, 1979

Species of moth

Stigmella abaiella is a moth of the family Nepticulidae. It is found in Iran.

The wingspan is about 3.5 mm.

The larvae feed on Pyrus communis.
