= Stigmella aflatuniae =

Scientific classification
- Kingdom: Animalia
- Phylum: Arthropoda
- Class: Insecta
- Order: Lepidoptera
- Family: Nepticulidae
- Genus: Stigmella
- Species: S. aflatuniae

Binomial name
- Stigmella aflatuniae Puplesis & Diskus, 1996b

Species of moth

Stigmella aflatuniae is a moth of the family Nepticulidae. It is only known from Tajikistan.

The larvae feed on Afflatunia ulmifolia. They probably mine the leaves of their host plant.
