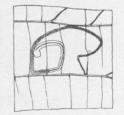

Scientific classification
- Kingdom: Animalia
- Phylum: Arthropoda
- Clade: Pancrustacea
- Class: Insecta
- Order: Lepidoptera
- Family: Nepticulidae
- Genus: Stigmella
- Species: S. tiliella

Binomial name
- Stigmella tiliella (Braun, 1912)

Synonyms
- Nepticula tiliella Braun, 1912

= Stigmella tiliella =

Species of moth

Stigmella tiliella is a moth of the family Nepticulidae. It is found in Ohio and Kentucky in the United States.

The wingspan is 3.4–4 mm. There are two generations per year. Adults are on wing in mid-June and early August or late July. Late instar larvae have been found in late August and in early July.

The larvae feed on Tilia americana. They mine the leaves of their host plant.
