= Stigmella himalayai =

Scientific classification
- Kingdom: Animalia
- Phylum: Arthropoda
- Class: Insecta
- Order: Lepidoptera
- Family: Nepticulidae
- Genus: Stigmella
- Species: S. himalayai

Binomial name
- Stigmella himalayai Puplesis & Diškus, 2003

Species of moth

Stigmella himalayai is a moth of the family Nepticulidae. It was described by Puplesis and Diškus in 2003. It is known from Nepal.
