= Stigmella variella =

Scientific classification
- Kingdom: Animalia
- Phylum: Arthropoda
- Clade: Pancrustacea
- Class: Insecta
- Order: Lepidoptera
- Family: Nepticulidae
- Genus: Stigmella
- Species: S. variella

Binomial name
- Stigmella variella (Braun, 1910)

Synonyms
- Nepticula variella Braun, 1910

Species of moth

Stigmella variella is a moth of the family Nepticulidae. It is found in the United States in California and Arizona.

The wingspan is 5.5-7.5 mm. There are two to three generations per year in California. Completed mines can be found from July to early September and February to April.

The larvae feed on Quercus agrifolia, Quercus wislizeni and Quercus kelloggii. They mine the leaves of their host plant.
