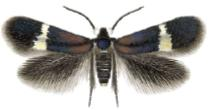
- Stigmella speciosa

Scientific classification
- Kingdom: Animalia
- Phylum: Arthropoda
- Class: Insecta
- Order: Lepidoptera
- Family: Nepticulidae
- Subfamily: Nepticulinae
- Genus: Stigmella; Schrank, 1802

Type species
- Phalaena (Tinea) anomalella Goze, 1783

Synonyms
- Nepticula Heyden, von 1843; Dysnepticula Börner, 1925; Astigmella Puplesis, 1984

= Stigmella (moth) =

Genus of moths

Stigmella is a genus of moths of the family Nepticulidae. The genus was erected by Franz von Paula Schrank in 1802.

Stigmella is a species-rich genus of tiny moths belonging to the family Nepticulidae, which contains the smallest moths, with a wingspan of only 2.5 mm. Approximately 320 species have been described, but it is likely that there are many more undescribed. Most of the dwarf moths have larvae that mine (eat the contents of the plant without breaking the surface) in the leaves of various plants, but there are also some that live in seeds or bark.

They are difficult to identify. Adults must be reared and/or determined by microscopic examination of the genitalia. Many records are based on the form of the leafmine only.

== Species found in Africa ==
- Stigmella abachausi (Janse, 1948)
- Stigmella abutilonica Scoble, 1978
- Stigmella allophylica Scoble, 1978
- Stigmella allophylivora Gustafsson, 1985
- Stigmella ampullata Scoble, 1978
- Stigmella androflava Scoble, 1978
- Stigmella angustivalva Scoble, 1978
- Stigmella caliginosa (Meyrick, 1921)
- Stigmella celtifoliella Vari, 1955
- Stigmella charistis Vari, 1963
- Stigmella confinalis Scoble, 1978
- Stigmella crotonica Scoble, 1978
- Stigmella dombeyivora Scoble, 1978
- Stigmella ficivora Gustafsson, 1985
- Stigmella fluida (Meyrick, 1911)
- Stigmella galactacma (Meyrick, 1924)
- Stigmella generalis Scoble, 1978
- Stigmella geranica Scoble, 1978
- Stigmella grewiae Scoble, 1978
- Stigmella gustafssoni (Capuse, 1975)
- Stigmella hortorum Scoble, 1978
- Stigmella ingens (Meyrick, 1913)
- Stigmella irrorata (Janse, 1948)
- Stigmella krugeri Vari, 1963
- Stigmella letabensis Scoble, 1978
- Stigmella liota Vari, 1963
- Stigmella mandingella (Gustafsson, 1972)
- Stigmella maytenivora Gustafsson, 1985
- Stigmella naibabi Mey, 2004
- Stigmella nigrata (Meyrick, 1913)
- Stigmella panconista (Meyrick, 1920)
- Stigmella parinarella Vari, 1955
- Stigmella perplexa (Janse, 1948)
- Stigmella platyzona Vari, 1963
- Stigmella porphyreuta (Meyrick, 1917)
- Stigmella potgieteri Scoble, 1978
- Stigmella pretoriata Scoble, 1978
- Stigmella protosema (Meyrick, 1921)
- Stigmella rhomboivora Gustafsson, 1985
- Stigmella rhynchosiella Vari, 1955
- Stigmella satarensis Scoble, 1978
- Stigmella tragilis Scoble, 1978
- Stigmella triumfettica Scoble, 1978
- Stigmella tropicatella Legrand, 1965
- Stigmella urbica (Meyrick, 1913)
- Stigmella uwusebi Mey, 2004
- Stigmella varii Scoble, 1978
- Stigmella wollofella (Gustafsson, 1972)
- Stigmella worcesteri Scoble, 1983
- Stigmella xuthomitra (Meyrick, 1921)

== Species found in the Palearctic ecozone ==
The following species are found in Europe:

- Stigmella aceris (Frey, 1857)
- Stigmella aeneofasciella (Herrich-Schäffer, 1855)
- Stigmella alaternella (Le Marchand, 1937)
- Stigmella alnetella (Stainton, 1856)
- Stigmella amygdali (Klimesch, 1978)
- Stigmella anomalella (Goeze, 1783)
- Stigmella assimilella (Zeller, 1848)
- Stigmella atricapitella (Haworth, 1828)
- Stigmella aurella (Fabricius, 1775)
- Stigmella auromarginella (Richardson, 1890)
- Stigmella aurora Puplesis, 1984
- Stigmella azaroli (Klimesch, 1978)
- Stigmella basiguttella (Heinemann, 1862)
- Stigmella benanderella (Wolff, 1955)
- Stigmella betulicola (Stainton, 1856)
- Stigmella carpinella (Heinemann, 1862)
- Stigmella catharticella (Stainton, 1853)
- Stigmella centifoliella (Zeller, 1848)
- Stigmella cocciferae van Nieukerken & Johansson, 2003
- Stigmella confusella (Wood & Walsingham, 1894)
- Stigmella continuella (Stainton, 1856)
- Stigmella crataegella (Klimesch, 1936)
- Stigmella crenulatae (Klimesch, 1975)
- Stigmella desperatella (Frey, 1856)
- Stigmella diniensis (Klimesch, 1975)
- Stigmella dorsiguttella (Johansson, 1971)
- Stigmella dryadella (O. Hofmann, 1868)
- Stigmella eberhardi (Johansson, 1971)
- Stigmella fasciata van Nieukerken & Johansson, 2003
- Stigmella filipendulae (Wocke, 1871)
- Stigmella floslactella (Haworth, 1828)
- Stigmella freyella (Heyden, 1858)
- Stigmella geimontani (Klimesch, 1940)
- Stigmella glutinosae (Stainton, 1858)
- Stigmella hahniella (Wortz, 1890)
- Stigmella hemargyrella (Kollar, 1832)
- Stigmella hybnerella (Hübner, 1796)
- Stigmella ilicifoliella (Mendes, 1918)
- Stigmella incognitella (Herrich-Schäffer, 1855)
- Stigmella inopinata A. & Z. Lastuvka, 1991
- Stigmella irregularis Puplesis, 1994
- Stigmella johanssonella A. & Z. Lastuvka, 1997
- Stigmella kazakhstanica Puplesis, 1991
- Stigmella lapponica (Wocke, 1862)
- Stigmella lediella (Schleich, 1867)
- Stigmella lemniscella (Zeller, 1839)
- Stigmella lonicerarum (Frey, 1856)
- Stigmella luteella (Stainton, 1857)
- Stigmella macrolepidella (Klimesch, 1978)
- Stigmella magdalenae (Klimesch, 1950)
- Stigmella malella (Stainton, 1854)
- Stigmella mespilicola (Frey, 1856)
- Stigmella microtheriella (Stainton, 1854)
- Stigmella minusculella (Herrich-Schäffer, 1855)
- Stigmella muricatella (Klimesch, 1978)
- Stigmella myrtillella (Stainton, 1857)
- Stigmella naturnella (Klimesch, 1936)
- Stigmella nivenburgensis (Preissecker, 1942)
- Stigmella nylandriella (Tengstrom, 1848)
- Stigmella obliquella (Heinemann, 1862)
- Stigmella oxyacanthella (Stainton, 1854)
- Stigmella paliurella Gerasimov, 1937
- Stigmella pallidiciliella Klimesch, 1946
- Stigmella paradoxa (Frey, 1858)
- Stigmella perpygmaeella (Doubleday, 1859)
- Stigmella plagicolella (Stainton, 1854)
- Stigmella poterii (Stainton, 1857)
- Stigmella pretiosa (Heinemann, 1862)
- Stigmella prunetorum (Stainton, 1855)
- Stigmella pyrellicola (Klimesch, 1978)
- Stigmella pyri (Glitz, 1865)
- Stigmella pyrivora Gustafsson, 1981
- Stigmella regiella (Herrich-Schäffer, 1855)
- Stigmella rhamnella (Herrich-Schäffer, 1860)
- Stigmella rhamnophila (Amsel, 1934)
- Stigmella roborella (Johansson, 1971)
- Stigmella rolandi van Nieukerken, 1990
- Stigmella ruficapitella (Haworth, 1828)
- Stigmella sakhalinella Puplesis, 1984
- Stigmella salicis (Stainton, 1854)
- Stigmella samiatella (Zeller, 1839)
- Stigmella sanguisorbae (Wocke, 1865)
- Stigmella sorbi (Stainton, 1861)
- Stigmella speciosa (Frey, 1857)
- Stigmella spinosissimae (Waters, 1928)
- Stigmella splendidissimella (Herrich-Schäffer, 1855)
- Stigmella stelviana (Weber, 1938)
- Stigmella stettinensis (Heinemann, 1871)
- Stigmella styracicolella (Klimesch, 1978)
- Stigmella suberivora (Stainton, 1869)
- Stigmella svenssoni (Johansson, 1971)
- Stigmella szoecsiella (Borkowski, 1972)
- Stigmella thuringiaca (Petry, 1904)
- Stigmella tiliae (Frey, 1856)
- Stigmella tityrella (Stainton, 1854)
- Stigmella tormentillella (Herrich-Schäffer, 1860)
- Stigmella torminalis (Wood, 1890)
- Stigmella trimaculella (Haworth, 1828)
- Stigmella tristis (Wocke, 1862)
- Stigmella trojana Z. & A. Lastuvka, 1998
- Stigmella ulmiphaga (Preissecker, 1942)
- Stigmella ulmivora (Fologne, 1860)
- Stigmella vimineticola (Frey, 1856)
- Stigmella viscerella (Stainton, 1853)
- Stigmella xystodes (Meyrick, 1916)
- Stigmella zangherii (Klimesch, 1951)
- Stigmella zelleriella (Snellen, 1875)

The following species are found in the Palearctic ecozone, but not in Europe:

- Stigmella abaiella Klimesch, 1979
- Stigmella acerna Puplesis, 1988
- Stigmella acrochaetia Kemperman & Wilkinson, 1985
- Stigmella aflatuniae Puplesis & Diškus, 1996
- Stigmella aiderensis Puplesis, 1988
- Stigmella aladina Puplesis, 1984
- Stigmella alaurulenta Kemperman & Wilkinson, 1985
- Stigmella alikurokoi Kemperman & Wilkinson, 1985
- Stigmella alisa Puplesis, 1985
- Stigmella amuriella Puplesis, 1985
- Stigmella arbatella (Chrétien, 1922)
- Stigmella armeniana Puplesis, 1994
- Stigmella attenuata Puplesis, 1985
- Stigmella auricularia Puplesis, Diškus & Juchnevic, 2003
- Stigmella azuminoensis Hirano, 2010
- Stigmella azusa Hirano, 2010
- Stigmella betulifoliae Puplesis & Diškus, 2003
- Stigmella bicolor Puplesis, 1988
- Stigmella bicuspidata van Nieukerken & Johansson, 2003
- Stigmella birgittae Gustafsson, 1985
- Stigmella boehmeriae Kemperman & Wilkinson, 1985
- Stigmella bumbegerensis Puplesis, 1984
- Stigmella caesurifasciella Kemperman & Wilkinson, 1985
- Stigmella caspica Puplesis, 1994
- Stigmella castanopsiella (Kuroko, 1978)
- Stigmella cathepostis Kemperman & Wilkinson, 1985
- Stigmella cerasi Puplesis & Diškus, 1996
- Stigmella chaenomelae Kemperman & Wilkinson, 1985
- Stigmella circumargentea van Nieukerken & Y.Q. Liu, 2000
- Stigmella clisiotophora Kemperman & Wilkinson, 1985
- Stigmella conchyliata Kemperman & Wilkinson, 1985
- Stigmella crataegi Gerasimov, 1937
- Stigmella crataegivora Puplesis, 1985
- Stigmella crenatiella Hirano, 2010
- Stigmella dentatae Puplesis, 1984
- Stigmella dissona (Puplesis, 1984)
- Stigmella divina Puplesis, Diškus & van Nieukerken, 1997
- Stigmella egonokii Kemperman & Wilkinson, 1985
- Stigmella excelsa Puplesis & Diškus, 2003
- Stigmella fasciola Puplesis & Diškus, 2003
- Stigmella fervida Puplesis, 1984
- Stigmella ficulnea Puplesis & Krasilnikova, 1994
- Stigmella flavescens Puplesis, 1994
- Stigmella fumida Kemperman & Wilkinson, 1985
- Stigmella fuscacalyptriella Puplesis, 1994
- Stigmella georgiana Puplesis, 1994
- Stigmella gimmonella (Matsumura, 1931)
- Stigmella grandistyla Puplesis, 1994
- Stigmella gutlebiella Laštuvka & Huemer, 2002
- Stigmella hisakoae Hirano, 2010
- Stigmella hisaii Kuroko, 2004
- Stigmella hissariella Puplesis, 1994
- Stigmella honshui Kemperman & Wilkinson, 1985
- Stigmella ichigoiella Kemperman & Wilkinson, 1985
- Stigmella johanssoni Puplesis & Diškus, 1996
- Stigmella juratae Puplesis, 1988
- Stigmella kao van Nieukerken & Y.Q. Liu, 2000
- Stigmella karsholti van Nieukerken & Johansson, 2003
- Stigmella kasyi van Nieukerken & Johansson, 2003
- Stigmella klimeschi Puplesis, 1988
- Stigmella kondarai Puplesis, 1988
- Stigmella kopetdagica Puplesis, 1994
- Stigmella kozlovi Puplesis, 1984
- Stigmella kurilensis Puplesis, 1987
- Stigmella kurokoi Puplesis, 1984
- Stigmella kurotsubarai Kemperman & Wilkinson, 1985
- Stigmella kuznetzovi Puplesis, 1994
- Stigmella lanceolata Puplesis, 1994
- Stigmella lithocarpella van Nieukerken & Liu, 2000
- Stigmella longispina Puplesis, 1994
- Stigmella lurida Puplesis, 1994
- Stigmella malifoliella Puplesis, 1991
- Stigmella maloidica Puplesis, 1991
- Stigmella micromelis Puplesis, 1985
- Stigmella mirabella (Puplesis, 1984)
- Stigmella monella Puplesis, 1984
- Stigmella montana Puplesis, 1991
- Stigmella monticulella Puplesis, 1984
- Stigmella morivora Hirano, 2010
- Stigmella motiekaitisi Puplesis, 1994
- Stigmella nakamurai Kemperman & Wilkinson, 1985
- Stigmella nireae Kemperman & Wilkinson, 1985
- Stigmella nostrata Puplesis, 1984
- Stigmella oa Kemperman & Wilkinson, 1985
- Stigmella omelkoi Puplesis, 1984
- Stigmella oplismeniella Kemperman & Wilkinson, 1985
- Stigmella orientalis Kemperman & Wilkinson, 1985
- Stigmella palionisi Puplesis, 1984
- Stigmella palmatae Puplesis, 1984
- Stigmella pamirbetulae Puplesis & Diškus, 2003
- Stigmella polymorpha Puplesis & Diškus, 2003
- Stigmella populnea Kemperman & Wilkinson, 1985
- Stigmella sashai Puplesis, 1984
- Stigmella semiaurea Puplesis, 1988
- Stigmella sesplicata Kemperman & Wilkinson, 1985
- Stigmella sorbivora Kemperman & Wilkinson, 1985
- Stigmella spiculifera Kemperman & Wilkinson, 1985
- Stigmella subsorbi Puplesis, 1994
- Stigmella taigae Puplesis, 1984
- Stigmella talassica Puplesis, 1992
- Stigmella tegmentosella Puplesis, 1984
- Stigmella titivillitia Kemperman & Wilkinson, 1985
- Stigmella tranocrossa Kemperman & Wilkinson, 1985
- Stigmella trifasciata (Matsumura, 1931)
- Stigmella trisyllaba Puplesis, 1992
- Stigmella turbatrix Puplesis, 1994
- Stigmella ultima Puplesis, 1984
- Stigmella vandrieli van Nieukerken & Liu, 2000
- Stigmella vittata Kemperman & Wilkinson, 1985
- Stigmella zagulaevi Puplesis, 1994
- Stigmella zelkoviella Kemperman & Wilkinson, 1985
- Stigmella zizyphi (Walsingham, 1911)
- Stigmella zumii Kemperman & Wilkinson, 1985

== Species found in the Indo-Malayan ecozone ==
- Stigmella aeriventris (Meyrick, 1932)
- Stigmella alicia (Meyrick, 1928)
- Stigmella argyrodoxa (Meyrick, 1918)
- Stigmella auxozona (Meyrick, 1934)
- Stigmella ebbenielseni van Nieukerken & van den Berg, 2003
- Stigmella elachistarcha (Meyrick, 1934)
- Stigmella elegantiae Puplesis & Diškus, 2003
- Stigmella fibigeri Puplesis & Diškus, 2003
- Stigmella himalayai Puplesis & Diškus, 2003
- Stigmella hoplometalla (Meyrick, 1934)
- Stigmella ipomoeella (Gustafsson, 1976)
- Stigmella isochalca (Meyrick, 1916)
- Stigmella longicornuta Puplesis & Diškus, 2003
- Stigmella maculifera Puplesis & Diškus, 2003
- Stigmella neodora (Meyrick, 1918)
- Stigmella nepali Puplesis & Diškus, 2003
- Stigmella oligosperma (Meyrick, 1934)
- Stigmella oritis (Meyrick, 1910)
- Stigmella polydoxa (Meyrick, 1911)
- Stigmella skulei Puplesis & Diškus, 2003
- Stigmella sruogai Puplesis & Diškus, 2003
- Stigmella tenebrica Puplesis & Diškus, 2003

== Species found in Australia and New Zealand ==
The following species are found in Australia:

- Stigmella leucargyra (Meyrick, 1906)
- Stigmella phyllanthina (Meyrick, 1906)
- Stigmella symmora (Meyrick, 1906)

The following species are found in New Zealand:

- Stigmella aigialeia Donner & Wilkinson, 1989
- Stigmella aliena Donner & Wilkinson, 1989
- Stigmella atrata Donner & Wilkinson, 1989
- Stigmella cassiniae Donner & Wilkinson, 1989
- Stigmella childi Donner & Wilkinson, 1989
- Stigmella cypracma (Meyrick, 1916)
- Stigmella erysibodea Donner & Wilkinson, 1989
- Stigmella fulva (Watt, 1921)
- Stigmella hakekeae Donner & Wilkinson, 1989
- Stigmella hamishella Donner & Wilkinson, 1989
- Stigmella hoheriae Donner & Wilkinson, 1989
- Stigmella ilsea Donner & Wilkinson, 1989
- Stigmella insignis (Philpott, 1927)
- Stigmella kaimanua Donner & Wilkinson, 1989
- Stigmella laquaeorum (Dugdale, 1971)
- Stigmella lucida (Philpott, 1919)
- Stigmella maoriella (Walker, 1864)
- Stigmella microtheriella (Stainton, 1854) (invasive)
- Stigmella ogygia (Meyrick, 1889)
- Stigmella oriastra (Meyrick, 1917)
- Stigmella palaga Donner & Wilkinson, 1989
- Stigmella platina Donner & Wilkinson, 1989
- Stigmella progama (Meyrick, 1924)
- Stigmella progonopis (Meyrick, 1921)
- Stigmella propalaea (Meyrick, 1889)
- Stigmella sophorae (Hudson, 1939)
- Stigmella tricentra (Meyrick, 1889)
- Stigmella watti Donner & Wilkinson, 1989

== Species found in North and South America ==
The following species are found in North America:

- Stigmella alba Wilkinson & Scoble, 1979
- Stigmella altella (Braun, 1914)
- Stigmella amelanchierella (Clemens, 1862)
- Stigmella apicialbella (Chambers, 1873)
- Stigmella argentifasciella (Braun, 1912)
- Stigmella aromella Wilkinson & Scoble, 1979
- Stigmella belfrageella (Chambers, 1875)
- Stigmella braunella (W. W. Jones, 1933)
- Stigmella caryaefoliella van Nieukerken et al., 2016 (Clemens, 1861)
- Stigmella castaneaefoliella (Chambers, 1875)
- Stigmella ceanothi (Braun, 1910)
- Stigmella cerea (Braun, 1917)
- Stigmella condaliafoliella (Busck, 1900)
- Stigmella corylifoliella (Clemens, 1861)
- Stigmella crataegifoliella (Clemens, 1861)
- Stigmella diffasciae (Braun, 1910)
- Stigmella flavipedella (Braun, 1914)
- Stigmella fuscotibiella (Clemens, 1862)
- Stigmella gossypii (Forbes & Leonard, 1930)
- Stigmella heteromelis Newton & Wilkinson, 1982
- Stigmella inconspicuella Newton & Wilkinson, 1982
- Stigmella intermedia (Braun, 1917)
- Stigmella juglandifoliella (Clemens, 1861)
- Stigmella latifasciella (Chambers, 1878)
- Stigmella longisacca Newton & Wilkinson, 1982
- Stigmella maya Stonis, Remeikis, Diskus and Noreika, 2013
- Stigmella myricafoliella (Busck, 1900)
- Stigmella nigriverticella (Chambers, 1875)
- Stigmella ostryaefoliella (Clemens, 1861)
- Stigmella pallida (Braun, 1912)
- Stigmella plumosetaeella Newton & Wilkinson, 1982
- Stigmella pomivorella (Packard, 1870)
- Stigmella populetorum (Frey & Boll, 1878)
- Stigmella procrastinella (Braun, 1927)
- Stigmella prunifoliella (Clemens, 1861)
- Stigmella purpuratella (Braun, 1917)
- Stigmella quercipulchella (Chambers, 1878)
- Stigmella racemifera Šimkevičiūtė & Stonis, 2009
- Stigmella resplendensella (Chambers, 1875)
- Stigmella rhamnicola (Braun, 1916)
- Stigmella rhoifoliella (Braun, 1912)
- Stigmella rosaefoliella (Clemens, 1861)
- Stigmella saginella (Clemens, 1861)
- Stigmella scinanella Wilkinson & Scoble, 1979
- Stigmella scintillans (Braun, 1917)
- Stigmella sclerostyla Newton & Wilkinson, 1982
- Stigmella slingerlandella (Kearfott, 1908)
- Stigmella stigmaciella Wilkinson & Scoble, 1979
- Stigmella taeniola (Braun, 1925)
- Stigmella tiliella (Braun, 1912)
- Stigmella unifasciella (Chambers, 1875)
- Stigmella variella (Braun, 1910)
- Stigmella villosella (Clemens, 1861)

The following species are found in South and Central America, but not in North America:

- Stigmella albilamina Puplesis & Robinson, 2000
- Stigmella andina (Meyrick, 1915)
- Stigmella austroamericana Puplesis & Diškus, 2002
- Stigmella barbata Puplesis & Robinson, 2000
- Stigmella costalimai (Bourquin, 1962)
- Stigmella cuprata (Meyrick, 1915)
- Stigmella epicosma (Meyrick, 1915)
- Stigmella eurydesma (Meyrick, 1915)
- Stigmella fuscilamina Puplesis & Robinson, 2000
- Stigmella guittonae (Bourquin, 1962)
- Stigmella hamata Puplesis & Robinson, 2000
- Stigmella hylomaga (Meyrick, 1931)
- Stigmella imperatoria Puplesis & Robinson, 2000
- Stigmella johannis (Zeller, 1877)
- Stigmella kimae Puplesis & Robinson, 2000
- Stigmella marmorea Puplesis & Robinson, 2000
- Stigmella montanotropica Puplesis & Diškus, 2002
- Stigmella nubimontana Puplesis & Diškus, 2002
- Stigmella olyritis (Meyrick, 1915)
- Stigmella ovata Puplesis & Robinson, 2000
- Stigmella peruanica Puplesis & Robinson, 2000
- Stigmella pruinosa Puplesis & Robinson, 2000
- Stigmella rubeta Puplesis & Diškus, 2002
- Stigmella rudis Puplesis & Robinson, 2000
- Stigmella schoorli Puplesis & Robinson, 2000
