= Stigmella trojana =

Scientific classification
- Kingdom: Animalia
- Phylum: Arthropoda
- Class: Insecta
- Order: Lepidoptera
- Family: Nepticulidae
- Genus: Stigmella
- Species: S. trojana

Binomial name
- Stigmella trojana Z. & A. Lastuvka, 1998

Species of moth

Stigmella trojana is a moth of the family Nepticulidae. It is found in northern Greece and Turkey.

The wingspan is 4.4–5 mm. Adults are on wing in June, July and October.

The larvae feed on Quercus trojana. They mine the leaves of their host plant.
