= Stigmella gustafssoni =

Scientific classification
- Kingdom: Animalia
- Phylum: Arthropoda
- Class: Insecta
- Order: Lepidoptera
- Family: Nepticulidae
- Genus: Stigmella
- Species: S. gustafssoni

Binomial name
- Stigmella gustafssoni (Capuse, 1975)

Species of moth

Stigmella gustafssoni is a moth of the family Nepticulidae. It was described by Capuse in 1975. It is found in Zambia.
