= Stigmella pallida =

Scientific classification
- Kingdom: Animalia
- Phylum: Arthropoda
- Clade: Pancrustacea
- Class: Insecta
- Order: Lepidoptera
- Family: Nepticulidae
- Genus: Stigmella
- Species: S. pallida

Binomial name
- Stigmella pallida (Braun, 1912)

Synonyms
- Nepticula pallida Braun, 1912

Species of moth

Stigmella pallida is a moth of the family Nepticulidae. It is found in Ohio, United States. The wingspan is about 3.8 mm.

The larvae feed on Salix species. They mine the leaves of their host plant.
