= Stigmella olyritis =

Scientific classification
- Kingdom: Animalia
- Phylum: Arthropoda
- Class: Insecta
- Order: Lepidoptera
- Family: Nepticulidae
- Genus: Stigmella
- Species: S. olyritis

Binomial name
- Stigmella olyritis (Meyrick, 1915)

Species of moth

Stigmella olyritis is a moth of the family Nepticulidae. It was described by Edward Meyrick in 1915, and is known from Peru.
