= Stigmella macrolepidella =

Scientific classification
- Kingdom: Animalia
- Phylum: Arthropoda
- Clade: Pancrustacea
- Class: Insecta
- Order: Lepidoptera
- Family: Nepticulidae
- Genus: Stigmella
- Species: S. macrolepidella

Binomial name
- Stigmella macrolepidella (Klimesch, 1978)

Synonyms
- Nepticula macrolepidella Klimesch, 1978

Species of moth

Stigmella macrolepidella is a moth of the family Nepticulidae. It is found in mainland Greece (the north and Peloponnesos), Rhodes, Turkey and possibly Haifa in Israel.

The wingspan is 3.8-4.7 mm. Adults are on wing in May, June, August and reared from September to October.

The larvae feed on Quercus macrolepis. They mine the leaves of their host plant.
