= Stigmella betulifoliae =

Scientific classification
- Kingdom: Animalia
- Phylum: Arthropoda
- Class: Insecta
- Order: Lepidoptera
- Family: Nepticulidae
- Genus: Stigmella
- Species: S. betulifoliae

Binomial name
- Stigmella betulifoliae Puplesis & Diškus, 2003

Species of moth

Stigmella betulifoliae is a moth of the family Nepticulidae. It was described by Puplesis and Diškus in 2003. Specimens were in Tajikistan.

The larvae feed on Betula turkestanica. They probably mine the leaves of their host plant.
