= Stigmella maculifera =

Scientific classification
- Kingdom: Animalia
- Phylum: Arthropoda
- Class: Insecta
- Order: Lepidoptera
- Family: Nepticulidae
- Genus: Stigmella
- Species: S. maculifera

Binomial name
- Stigmella maculifera Puplesis & Diškus, 2003

Species of moth

Stigmella maculifera is a moth of the family Nepticulidae. It was described by Puplesis and Diškus in 2003. It is known from the northern region of Oman.
