= Stigmella uwusebi =

Scientific classification
- Kingdom: Animalia
- Phylum: Arthropoda
- Clade: Pancrustacea
- Class: Insecta
- Order: Lepidoptera
- Family: Nepticulidae
- Genus: Stigmella
- Species: S. uwusebi

Binomial name
- Stigmella uwusebi Mey, 2004

Species of moth

Stigmella uwusebi is a moth of the family Nepticulidae. It was described by Wolfram Mey in 2004. It is found in Namibia.
