= Stigmella aeriventris =

Scientific classification
- Kingdom: Animalia
- Phylum: Arthropoda
- Class: Insecta
- Order: Lepidoptera
- Family: Nepticulidae
- Genus: Stigmella
- Species: S. aeriventris

Binomial name
- Stigmella aeriventris (Meyrick, 1932)

Synonyms
- Nepticula aeriventris Meyrick, 1932

Species of moth

Stigmella aeriventris is a moth of the family Nepticulidae. It is known from Maharashtra in India.

The larvae feed on Allophylus cobbe. They probably mine the leaves of their host plant.
