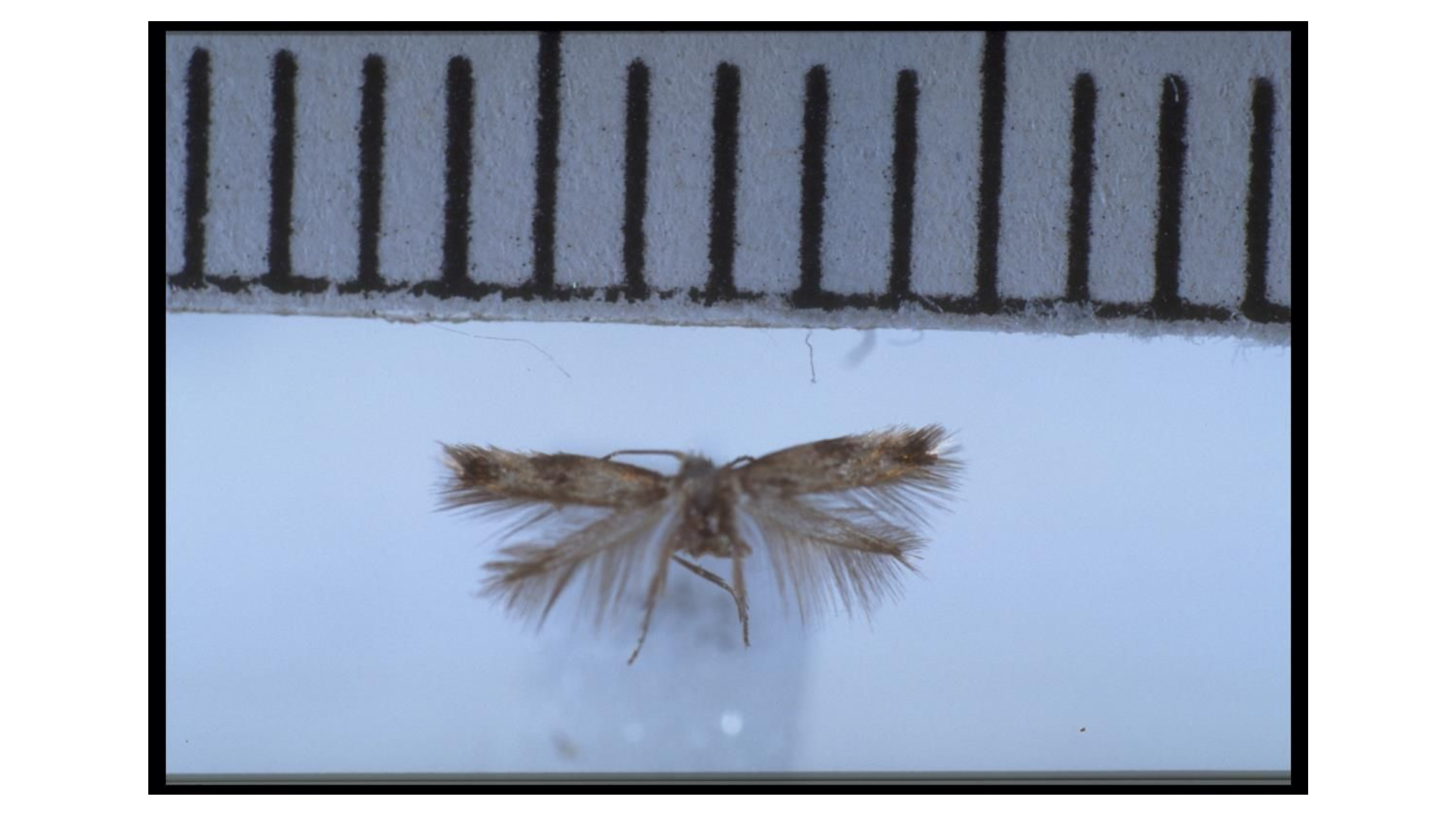
- Male holotype

Scientific classification
- Kingdom: Animalia
- Phylum: Arthropoda
- Clade: Pancrustacea
- Class: Insecta
- Order: Lepidoptera
- Family: Nepticulidae
- Genus: Stigmella
- Species: S. hamishella

Binomial name
- Stigmella hamishella Donner & Wilkinson, 1989

= Stigmella hamishella =

Species of moth

Stigmella hamishella is a moth of the family Nepticulidae. It is endemic to New Zealand and has been observed in the South Island. The larvae mine the leaves of Olearia moschata. The mine consists of blotches, mainly on the lower leaves. The preferred habitat of S. hamishella is the same as its host plant, montane to subalpine shrubland. Adults are on the wing in December.

== Taxonomy ==
This species was first described in 1989 by Hans Donner and Christopher Wilkinson from specimens collected in Fiordland. The male holotype specimen, collected at Homer Tunnel, at 900 m altitude on the 29 December 1983 by B. H. Patrick, is held in the New Zealand Arthropod Collection.

== Description ==
Donner and Wilkinson described the male of this species as follows:

Head. Frontal tuft white; scape white and grey; collar greyish white; antenna dark grey, comprising 36 segments. Thorax grey. Forewing about 4 mm long; ground colour whitish grey, with basal, medial, and terminal dark grey areas and vague black spots medially and terminally; fringe grey. Hindwing and fringe grey. Abdomen pale brown.

Donner and Wilkinson described the female of the species as follows:

Generally larger than male; antenna comprising 32 segments; forewing paler, with spots more conspicuous.

Donner and Wilkinson explained that the differences in genitalia and general appearance of this species indicated that is a discrete species.

== Distribution ==
This species is endemic to New Zealand. It has been observed in the South Island.

== Host and habitat ==
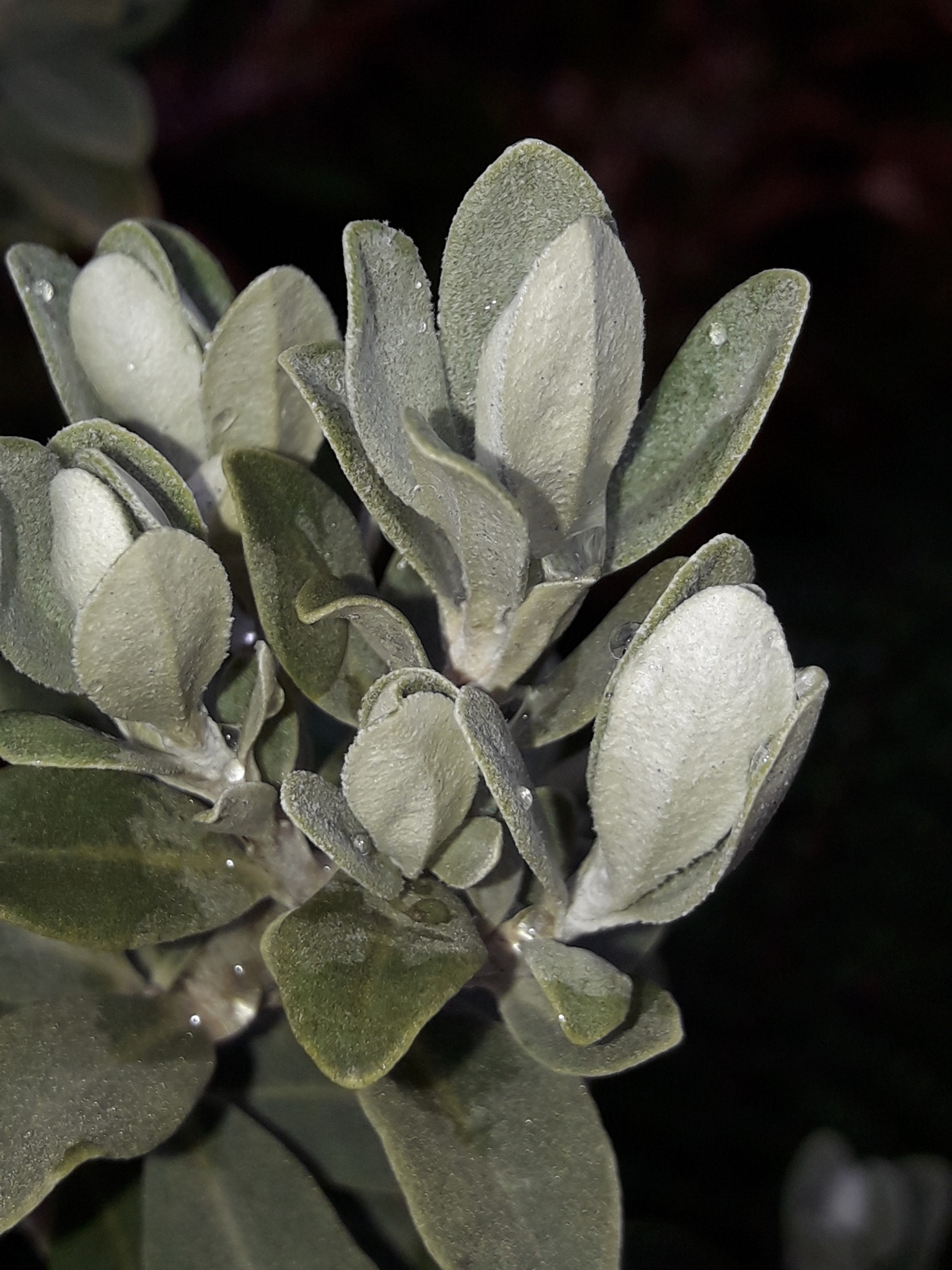
Larval host O. moschata.

The larvae feed on Olearia moschata. The preferred habitat of S. hamishella is the same as its host plant, montane to subalpine shrubland.

== Behaviour ==
The larvae of this species mine the leaves of their host plant. The mine consists of blotches, mainly on the lower leaves. Adults have been recorded in December.
