= Stigmella costalimai =

Scientific classification
- Kingdom: Animalia
- Phylum: Arthropoda
- Class: Insecta
- Order: Lepidoptera
- Family: Nepticulidae
- Genus: Stigmella
- Species: S. costalimai

Binomial name
- Stigmella costalimai (Bourquin, 1962)

Species of moth

Stigmella costalimai is a moth of the family Nepticulidae. It is known from Argentina.
