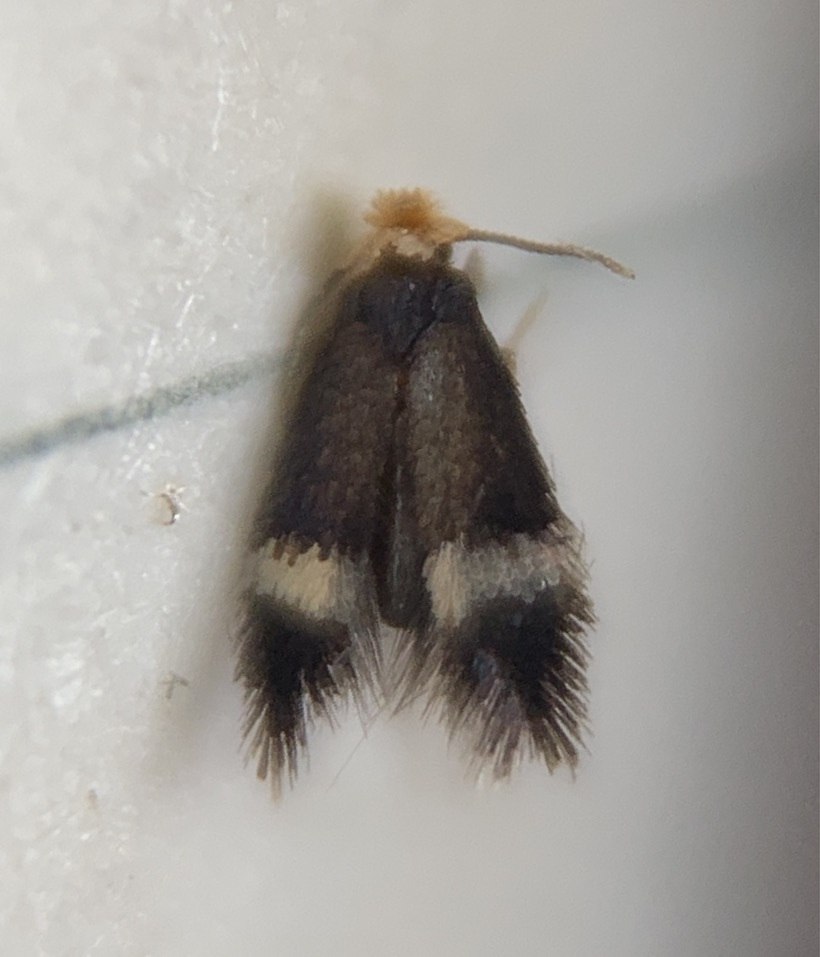
- Stigmella caryaefoliella, Massachusetts

Scientific classification
- Kingdom: Animalia
- Phylum: Arthropoda
- Clade: Pancrustacea
- Class: Insecta
- Order: Lepidoptera
- Family: Nepticulidae
- Genus: Stigmella
- Species: S. caryaefoliella

Binomial name
- Stigmella caryaefoliella van Nieukerken et al., 2016 (Clemens, 1861)

Synonyms
- Nepticula caryaefoliella Clemens, 1861

= Stigmella caryaefoliella =

Species of moth

Stigmella caryaefoliella is a species of pygmy eye-capped moth in the family Nepticulidae found in North America.
