= Stigmella arbatella =

Scientific classification
- Kingdom: Animalia
- Phylum: Arthropoda
- Class: Insecta
- Order: Lepidoptera
- Family: Nepticulidae
- Genus: Stigmella
- Species: S. arbatella

Binomial name
- Stigmella arbatella (Chrétien, 1922)

Species of moth

Stigmella arbatella is a moth of the family Nepticulidae. It is known from Morocco.
