= Stigmella amygdali =

Scientific classification
- Kingdom: Animalia
- Phylum: Arthropoda
- Clade: Pancrustacea
- Class: Insecta
- Order: Lepidoptera
- Family: Nepticulidae
- Genus: Stigmella
- Species: S. amygdali

Binomial name
- Stigmella amygdali (Klimesch, 1978)

Synonyms
- Nepticula amygdali Klimesch, 1978

Species of moth

Stigmella amygdali is a moth of the family Nepticulidae. It is found in Greece (including the mainland, Rhodes and Crete).

The larvae feed on Prunus dulcis. They mine the leaves of their host plant.
