= Stigmella diffasciae =

Scientific classification
- Kingdom: Animalia
- Phylum: Arthropoda
- Clade: Pancrustacea
- Class: Insecta
- Order: Lepidoptera
- Family: Nepticulidae
- Genus: Stigmella
- Species: S. diffasciae

Binomial name
- Stigmella diffasciae (Braun, 1910)

Synonyms
- Nepticula diffasciae Braun, 1910

Species of moth

Stigmella diffasciae is a moth of the family Nepticulidae. It is found in California, United States.

Mine

The wingspan is 5.4-5.8 mm. There is probably one generation per year with larvae in March and adults in May.

The larvae feed on Ceanothus species. They mine the leaves of their host plant.
