= Stigmella ostryaefoliella =

Scientific classification
- Kingdom: Animalia
- Phylum: Arthropoda
- Clade: Pancrustacea
- Class: Insecta
- Order: Lepidoptera
- Family: Nepticulidae
- Genus: Stigmella
- Species: S. ostryaefoliella

Binomial name
- Stigmella ostryaefoliella (Clemens, 1861)

Synonyms
- Nepticula ostryaefoliella Clemens, 1862; Nepticula caryaefoliella Clemens, 1862; Nepticula obscurella Braun, 1912

Species of moth

Stigmella ostryaefoliella is a moth of the family Nepticulidae. It is found in North America in Ohio, New Jersey, New York, Florida and Ontario.

Mine

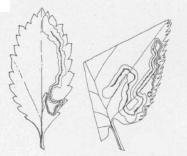
Mines

There are two generations per year.

The larvae feed on a wide range of plants, including Carya (including Carya ovata), Ostrya and Carpinus. They mine the leaves of their host plant.
