= Stigmella ficivora =

Scientific classification
- Kingdom: Animalia
- Phylum: Arthropoda
- Class: Insecta
- Order: Lepidoptera
- Family: Nepticulidae
- Genus: Stigmella
- Species: S. ficivora

Binomial name
- Stigmella ficivora Gustafsson, 1985

Species of moth

Stigmella ficivora is a moth of the family Nepticulidae. It was described by Gustafsson in 1985. It is endemic to Gambia where it is found only in one city called Bakau.

The larvae feed on Ficus parasitica species. They probably mine the leaves of their host plant.
