= Stigmella bicolor =

Scientific classification
- Kingdom: Animalia
- Phylum: Arthropoda
- Class: Insecta
- Order: Lepidoptera
- Family: Nepticulidae
- Genus: Stigmella
- Species: S. bicolor

Binomial name
- Stigmella bicolor Puplesis, 1988

Species of moth

Stigmella bicolor is a moth of the family Nepticulidae. It is found in Kazakhstan, Uzbekistan, Tajikistan and Kyrgyzstan.

The larvae feed on Acer species.
