= Stigmella pamirbetulae =

Scientific classification
- Kingdom: Animalia
- Phylum: Arthropoda
- Class: Insecta
- Order: Lepidoptera
- Family: Nepticulidae
- Genus: Stigmella
- Species: S. pamirbetulae

Binomial name
- Stigmella pamirbetulae Puplesis & Diškus, 2003

Species of moth

Stigmella pamirbetulae is a moth of the family Nepticulidae. It was described by Puplesis & Diškus in 2003. It is known from Tajikistan.

The larvae feed on Betula turkestanica. They probably mine the leaves of their host plant.
