= Stigmella nubimontana =

Scientific classification
- Kingdom: Animalia
- Phylum: Arthropoda
- Class: Insecta
- Order: Lepidoptera
- Family: Nepticulidae
- Genus: Stigmella
- Species: S. nubimontana

Binomial name
- Stigmella nubimontana Puplesis & Diškus, 2002

Species of moth

Stigmella nubimontana is a moth of the family Nepticulidae. It is found in the cloud forest of the high Andes in Ecuador.

The wingspan is 5.2-5.3 mm for males. Adults have been found from February to early March.

The larvae feed on Rubus species. They mine the leaves of their host plant.
