= Stigmella vandrieli =

Scientific classification
- Kingdom: Animalia
- Phylum: Arthropoda
- Clade: Pancrustacea
- Class: Insecta
- Order: Lepidoptera
- Family: Nepticulidae
- Genus: Stigmella
- Species: S. vandrieli

Binomial name
- Stigmella vandrieli van Nieukerken & Y.Q. Liu, 2000

Species of moth

Stigmella vandrieli is a moth of the family Nepticulidae. It is only known from Yunnan, China.

The wingspan is 4.9-5.6 mm. Larvae have been found in October, adults were reared in October and November.

The larvae feed on Cyclobalanopsis glaucoides. They mine the leaves of their host plant.
