= Stigmella trisyllaba =

Scientific classification
- Kingdom: Animalia
- Phylum: Arthropoda
- Class: Insecta
- Order: Lepidoptera
- Family: Nepticulidae
- Genus: Stigmella
- Species: S. trisyllaba

Binomial name
- Stigmella trisyllaba Puplesis, 1992

Species of moth

Stigmella trisyllaba is a moth of the family Nepticulidae. It is found in Kazakhstan, Tajikistan and Kyrgyzstan.

The larvae feed on Rosa species.
