= Stigmella austroamericana =

Scientific classification
- Kingdom: Animalia
- Phylum: Arthropoda
- Class: Insecta
- Order: Lepidoptera
- Family: Nepticulidae
- Genus: Stigmella
- Species: S. austroamericana

Binomial name
- Stigmella austroamericana Puplesis & Diškus, 2002

Species of moth

Stigmella austroamericana is a moth of the family Nepticulidae. It is found in the premontane rainforest on the Amazon in Ecuador.

The wingspan is 3.6-3.8 mm for males. Adults have been collected in late January.
