= Stigmella peruanica =

Scientific classification
- Kingdom: Animalia
- Phylum: Arthropoda
- Class: Insecta
- Order: Lepidoptera
- Family: Nepticulidae
- Genus: Stigmella
- Species: S. peruanica

Binomial name
- Stigmella peruanica Puplesis & Robinson, 2000

Species of moth

Stigmella peruanica is a moth of the family Nepticulidae. It was described by Puplesis and Robinson in 2000, and is known from Peru.
