= Stigmella bumbegerensis =

Scientific classification
- Kingdom: Animalia
- Phylum: Arthropoda
- Class: Insecta
- Order: Lepidoptera
- Family: Nepticulidae
- Genus: Stigmella
- Species: S. bumbegerensis

Binomial name
- Stigmella bumbegerensis Puplesis, 1984

Species of moth

Stigmella bumbegerensis is a moth of the family Nepticulidae. It is known from Bojan-Chongor Aimak in Mongolia.
