= Stigmella mandingella =

Scientific classification
- Kingdom: Animalia
- Phylum: Arthropoda
- Class: Insecta
- Order: Lepidoptera
- Family: Nepticulidae
- Genus: Stigmella
- Species: S. mandingella

Binomial name
- Stigmella mandingella (Gustafsson, 1972)

Species of moth

Stigmella mandingella is a moth of the family Nepticulidae. It was described by Gustafsson in 1972. It is found in Gambia.
