= Stigmella fuscacalyptriella =

Scientific classification
- Kingdom: Animalia
- Phylum: Arthropoda
- Class: Insecta
- Order: Lepidoptera
- Family: Nepticulidae
- Genus: Stigmella
- Species: S. fuscacalyptriella

Binomial name
- Stigmella fuscacalyptriella Puplesis, 1994

Species of moth

Stigmella fuscacalyptriella is a moth of the family Nepticulidae. It was described by Puplesis in 1994. It is known from Azerbayjan.
