= Stigmella cerasi =

Scientific classification
- Kingdom: Animalia
- Phylum: Arthropoda
- Class: Insecta
- Order: Lepidoptera
- Family: Nepticulidae
- Genus: Stigmella
- Species: S. cerasi

Binomial name
- Stigmella cerasi Puplesis & Diškus, 1996

Species of moth

Stigmella cerasi is a moth of the family Nepticulidae. It is found in Turkmenistan.

The larvae feed on Cerasus species.
