= Stigmella maytenivora =

Scientific classification
- Kingdom: Animalia
- Phylum: Arthropoda
- Class: Insecta
- Order: Lepidoptera
- Family: Nepticulidae
- Genus: Stigmella
- Species: S. maytenivora

Binomial name
- Stigmella maytenivora Gustafsson, 1985

Species of moth

Stigmella maytenivora is a moth of the family Nepticulidae. It was described by Gustafsson in 1985. It is found in Gambia.

The larvae feed on Maytenus sengalensis. They probably mine the leaves of their host plant.
