= Stigmella hylomaga =

Scientific classification
- Kingdom: Animalia
- Phylum: Arthropoda
- Clade: Pancrustacea
- Class: Insecta
- Order: Lepidoptera
- Family: Nepticulidae
- Genus: Stigmella
- Species: S. hylomaga

Binomial name
- Stigmella hylomaga (Meyrick, 1931)

Species of moth

Stigmella hylomaga is a moth of the family Nepticulidae. It is endemic to Argentina where it is found in Río Negro and Lake Correntoso.
