= Stigmella eurydesma =

Scientific classification
- Kingdom: Animalia
- Phylum: Arthropoda
- Class: Insecta
- Order: Lepidoptera
- Family: Nepticulidae
- Genus: Stigmella
- Species: S. eurydesma

Binomial name
- Stigmella eurydesma (Meyrick, 1915)

Species of moth

Stigmella eurydesma is a moth of the family Nepticulidae. It was described by Edward Meyrick in 1915. It is known from British Guyana.
