= Stigmella maloidica =

Scientific classification
- Kingdom: Animalia
- Phylum: Arthropoda
- Class: Insecta
- Order: Lepidoptera
- Family: Nepticulidae
- Genus: Stigmella
- Species: S. maloidica

Binomial name
- Stigmella maloidica Puplesis, 1991

Species of moth

Stigmella maloidica is a moth of the family Nepticulidae. It is only known from Tajikistan.

The larvae feed on Malus and Cotoneaster species.
