= Stigmella juratae =

Scientific classification
- Kingdom: Animalia
- Phylum: Arthropoda
- Class: Insecta
- Order: Lepidoptera
- Family: Nepticulidae
- Genus: Stigmella
- Species: S. juratae

Binomial name
- Stigmella juratae Puplesis, 1988

Species of moth

Stigmella juratae is a moth of the family Nepticulidae. It is found in Tajikistan.

The larvae probably feed on Salix species.
