= Stigmella kao =

Scientific classification
- Kingdom: Animalia
- Phylum: Arthropoda
- Clade: Pancrustacea
- Class: Insecta
- Order: Lepidoptera
- Family: Nepticulidae
- Genus: Stigmella
- Species: S. kao

Binomial name
- Stigmella kao van Nieukerken & Y.Q. Liu, 2000

Species of moth

Stigmella kao is a moth of the family Nepticulidae. It is only known from Yunnan, China.

The wingspan is 6.0–6.7 millimetres (0.24–0.26 in). Larvae have been found in October, adults were reared in November.

The larvae feed on Castanopsis orthocantha. They mine the leaves of their host plant.
