= Stigmella muricatella =

Scientific classification
- Kingdom: Animalia
- Phylum: Arthropoda
- Clade: Pancrustacea
- Class: Insecta
- Order: Lepidoptera
- Family: Nepticulidae
- Genus: Stigmella
- Species: S. muricatella

Binomial name
- Stigmella muricatella (Klimesch, 1978)

Synonyms
- Nepticula muricatella Klimesch, 1978

Species of moth

Stigmella muricatella is a moth of the family Nepticulidae. It is found in Greece and Turkey, the Near East, and east to the eastern part of the Palearctic realm.

The larvae feed on Sanguisorba minor muricata. They mine the leaves of their host plant.
