= Stigmella populetorum =

Scientific classification
- Kingdom: Animalia
- Phylum: Arthropoda
- Clade: Pancrustacea
- Class: Insecta
- Order: Lepidoptera
- Family: Nepticulidae
- Genus: Stigmella
- Species: S. populetorum

Binomial name
- Stigmella populetorum (Frey & Boll, 1878)

Synonyms
- Nepticula poputetorum Frey & Boll, 1878

Species of moth

Stigmella populetorum is a moth of the family Nepticulidae. It is found in North America in Texas, Ohio, Kentucky, California, Ontario and British Columbia.

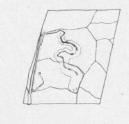
Mine

The wingspan is about 5 mm. Late instar larvae have been found in mid-June and August. Adults have been found from late June through to September. There are two and possibly three generation per year.

The larvae feed on Populus species, including Populus deltoides, Populus trichocarpa, Populus nigra italica and Populus x canadensis. They mine the leaves of their host plant.
