= Stigmella montanotropica =

Scientific classification
- Kingdom: Animalia
- Phylum: Arthropoda
- Class: Insecta
- Order: Lepidoptera
- Family: Nepticulidae
- Genus: Stigmella
- Species: S. montanotropica

Binomial name
- Stigmella montanotropica Puplesis & Diškus, 2002

Species of moth

Stigmella montanotropica is a moth of the family Nepticulidae. It is found in tropical montane forest on the western slopes on the Andes in Ecuador.

The wingspan is 5-5.1 mm for females. Adults have been found from February to early March.

The larvae feed on Acalypha species. They mine the leaves of their host plant.
