= Stigmella inopinata =

Scientific classification
- Kingdom: Animalia
- Phylum: Arthropoda
- Class: Insecta
- Order: Lepidoptera
- Family: Nepticulidae
- Genus: Stigmella
- Species: S. inopinata

Binomial name
- Stigmella inopinata A. & Z. Lastuvka, 1991

Species of moth

Stigmella inopinata is a moth of the family Nepticulidae. It has only been recorded from Slovakia and the Near East.
