= Stigmella rhamnicola =

Scientific classification
- Kingdom: Animalia
- Phylum: Arthropoda
- Clade: Pancrustacea
- Class: Insecta
- Order: Lepidoptera
- Family: Nepticulidae
- Genus: Stigmella
- Species: S. rhamnicola

Binomial name
- Stigmella rhamnicola (Braun, 1916)

Synonyms
- Nepticula rhamnella Braun, 1912 (junior homonym of Nepticula rhamnella Herrich-Schaffer, 1860); Nepticula rhamnicola Braun, 1916

Species of moth

Stigmella rhamnicola is a moth of the family Nepticulidae. It is found in Ohio, United States.

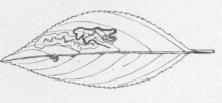
Mine

The wingspan is 4.2–5 mm for the summer generation and 4.4-5.6 for the winter generation. Mines have been collected in early July and October and are most abundant in October. There are two to three generations per year.

The larvae feed on Rhamnus lanceolata. They mine the leaves of their host plant.
