= Stigmella isochalca =

Scientific classification
- Kingdom: Animalia
- Phylum: Arthropoda
- Class: Insecta
- Order: Lepidoptera
- Family: Nepticulidae
- Genus: Stigmella
- Species: S. isochalca

Binomial name
- Stigmella isochalca (Meyrick, 1916)

Synonyms
- Nepticula isochalca Meyrick, 1916

Species of moth

Stigmella isochalca is a moth of the family Nepticulidae. It is known from Bengal in India.

The larvae feed on Phyllantus emblica. They probably mine the leaves of their host plant.
