= Stigmella neodora =

Scientific classification
- Kingdom: Animalia
- Phylum: Arthropoda
- Class: Insecta
- Order: Lepidoptera
- Family: Nepticulidae
- Genus: Stigmella
- Species: S. neodora

Binomial name
- Stigmella neodora (Meyrick, 1918)

Synonyms
- Nepticula neodora Meyrick, 1918

Species of moth

Stigmella neodora is a moth of the family Nepticulidae. It is known from Karnataka in India.
