= Stigmella kasyi =

Scientific classification
- Kingdom: Animalia
- Phylum: Arthropoda
- Clade: Pancrustacea
- Class: Insecta
- Order: Lepidoptera
- Family: Nepticulidae
- Genus: Stigmella
- Species: S. kasyi

Binomial name
- Stigmella kasyi van Nieukerken & Johansson, 2003

Species of moth

Stigmella kasyi is a moth of the family Nepticulidae, known only from eastern Afghanistan.

It has a wingspan of 7.5–8.6 millimetres (0.30–0.34 in).

The larvae feed on Quercus baloot, mining the leaves of their host plant.
