= Stigmella hoplometalla =

Scientific classification
- Kingdom: Animalia
- Phylum: Arthropoda
- Class: Insecta
- Order: Lepidoptera
- Family: Nepticulidae
- Genus: Stigmella
- Species: S. hoplometalla

Binomial name
- Stigmella hoplometalla (Meyrick, 1934)

Synonyms
- Nepticula hoplometalla Meyrick, 1934

Species of moth

Stigmella hoplometalla is a moth of the family Nepticulidae. It is known from Maharashtra in India.

The larvae feed on Butea frondosa. They probably mine the leaves of their host plant.
