= Stigmella crataegi =

Scientific classification
- Kingdom: Animalia
- Phylum: Arthropoda
- Class: Insecta
- Order: Lepidoptera
- Family: Nepticulidae
- Genus: Stigmella
- Species: S. crataegi

Binomial name
- Stigmella crataegi Gerasimov, 1937

Species of moth

Stigmella crataegi is a moth of the family Nepticulidae. It is found in Kyrgyzstan.

The larvae feed on Crataegus species.
