= Stigmella circumargentea =

Scientific classification
- Kingdom: Animalia
- Phylum: Arthropoda
- Clade: Pancrustacea
- Class: Insecta
- Order: Lepidoptera
- Family: Nepticulidae
- Genus: Stigmella
- Species: S. circumargentea

Binomial name
- Stigmella circumargentea van Nieukerken & Y.Q. Liu, 2000

Species of moth

Stigmella circumargentea is a moth of the family Nepticulidae. It is only known from Yunnan.

The wingspan is about 6.2 mm. Larvae have been found in October; adults were reared in November.

The larvae feed on Lithocarpus dealbatus and possibly Lithocarpus mairei. They mine the leaves of their host plant.
