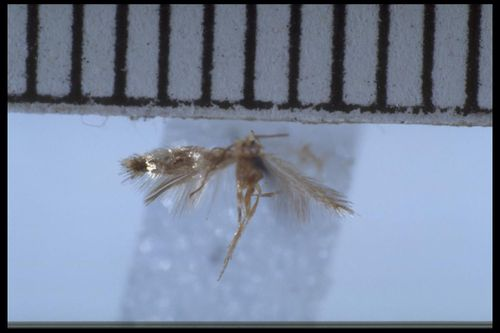
- Male holotype

Scientific classification
- Kingdom: Animalia
- Phylum: Arthropoda
- Clade: Pancrustacea
- Class: Insecta
- Order: Lepidoptera
- Family: Nepticulidae
- Genus: Stigmella
- Species: S. aliena

Binomial name
- Stigmella aliena Donner & Wilkinson, 1989

= Stigmella aliena =

Species of moth endemic to New Zealand

Stigmella aliena is a moth of the family Nepticulidae. It is endemic to New Zealand and has only been observed at Mount Arthur in the north western area of the South Island. This species is known only from the male holotype specimen. The larvae of this species are likely leaf miners, however the biology of this species is currently unknown, as is the female of this species. The adults are on the wing in December.

== Taxonomy ==
This species was first described in 1989 by Hans Donner and Christopher Wilkinson from a specimen collected on Mount Arthur, at 1200 m, on 25 December 1921 by Alfred Philpott. Donner and Wilkinson noted the "marked differences" in the genitalia of the holotype specimen of this species when compared to other species of moth in this genus. The male holotype specimen is held at the New Zealand Arthropod Collection.

== Description ==
The male of the species has a white tuft, scrape and collar as well as a white thorax. The antennae has approximately 34 segments and is coloured brown as is the abdomen of the male. The length of the forewings is about 3 mm. The forewings are coloured white but with gold and purple reflective colouration. On various portions of the forewings, the male moth has large patches of brown scales as well as a small black spot in the middle of the forewings and some black scales at the end of the wings. The fringes of the forewings are silvery white as are the hindwings and fringe.

== Distribution ==
This species is endemic to New Zealand. It has only been collected on Mount Arthur in the north western area of the South Island.

== Biology ==
As at 1989 the female of the species is unknown, as is the biology of this species.
