= Stigmella quercipulchella =

Scientific classification
- Kingdom: Animalia
- Phylum: Arthropoda
- Clade: Pancrustacea
- Class: Insecta
- Order: Lepidoptera
- Family: Nepticulidae
- Genus: Stigmella
- Species: S. quercipulchella

Binomial name
- Stigmella quercipulchella (Chambers, 1878)

Synonyms
- Nepticula quercipulchella Chambers, in Hayden, 1878; Nepticula terminella Braun, 1914

Species of moth

Stigmella quercipulchella is a moth of the family Nepticulidae. It is found in North America in Kentucky, Ohio, Pennsylvania, Illinois and Ontario.

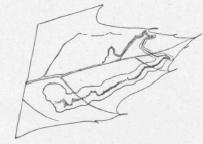
Mine

There are two generations per year.

The larvae feed on Quercus species, including Q. palustris, Q. marilandica and Q. rubra. They mine the leaves of their host plant.
