= Stigmella klimeschi =

Scientific classification
- Kingdom: Animalia
- Phylum: Arthropoda
- Class: Insecta
- Order: Lepidoptera
- Family: Nepticulidae
- Genus: Stigmella
- Species: S. klimeschi

Binomial name
- Stigmella klimeschi Puplesis, 1988

Species of moth

Stigmella klimeschi is a moth of the family Nepticulidae. It is found in Kazakhstan and Tajikistan.

The larvae feed on Rhamnus species.
