= Stigmella johannis =

Scientific classification
- Kingdom: Animalia
- Phylum: Arthropoda
- Clade: Pancrustacea
- Class: Insecta
- Order: Lepidoptera
- Family: Nepticulidae
- Genus: Stigmella
- Species: S. johannis

Binomial name
- Stigmella johannis (Zeller, 1877)

Species of moth

Stigmella johannis is a moth of the family Nepticulidae. It was described by Zeller in 1877, and is known from Bogotá, Colombia.
