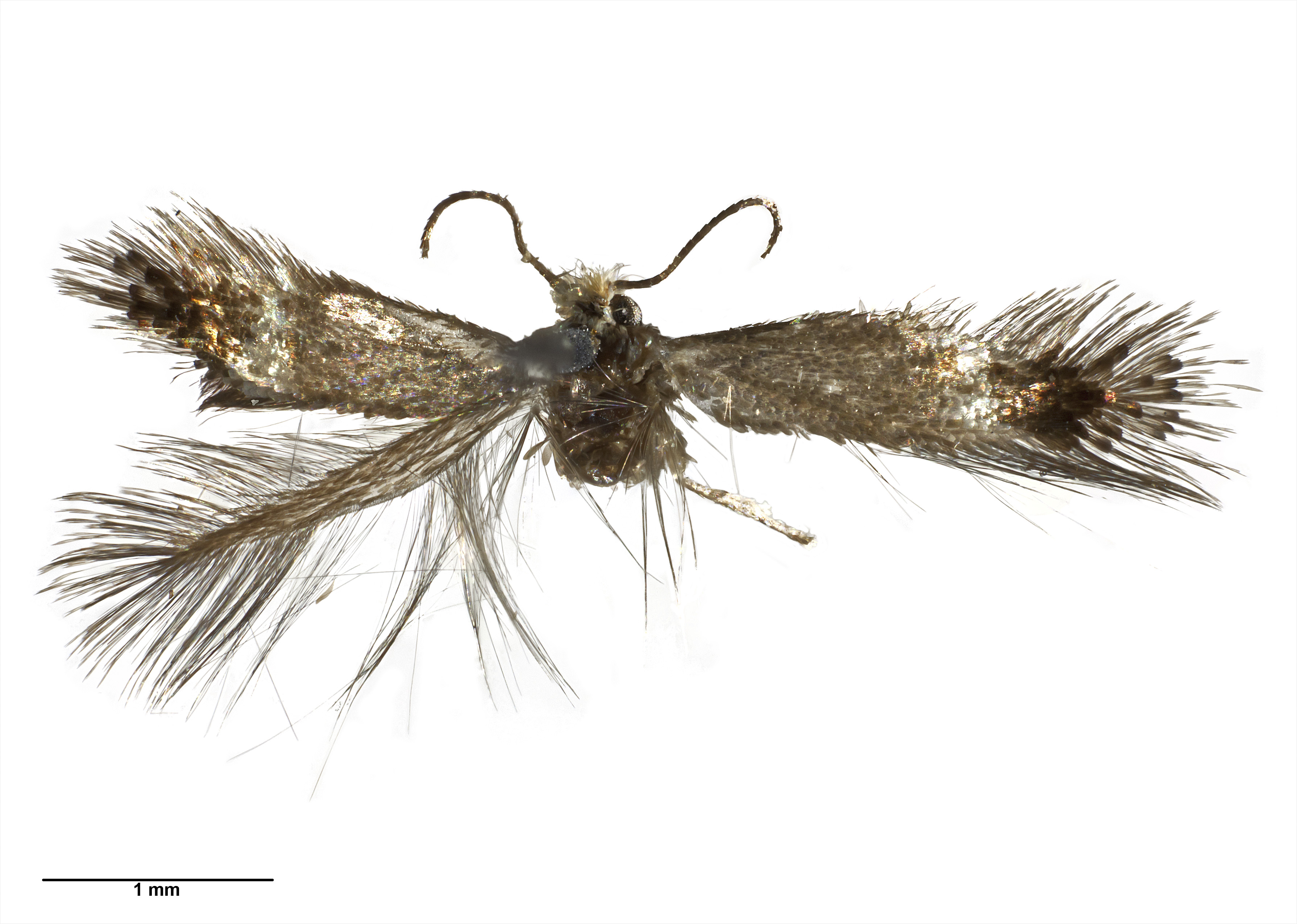
- Female syntype
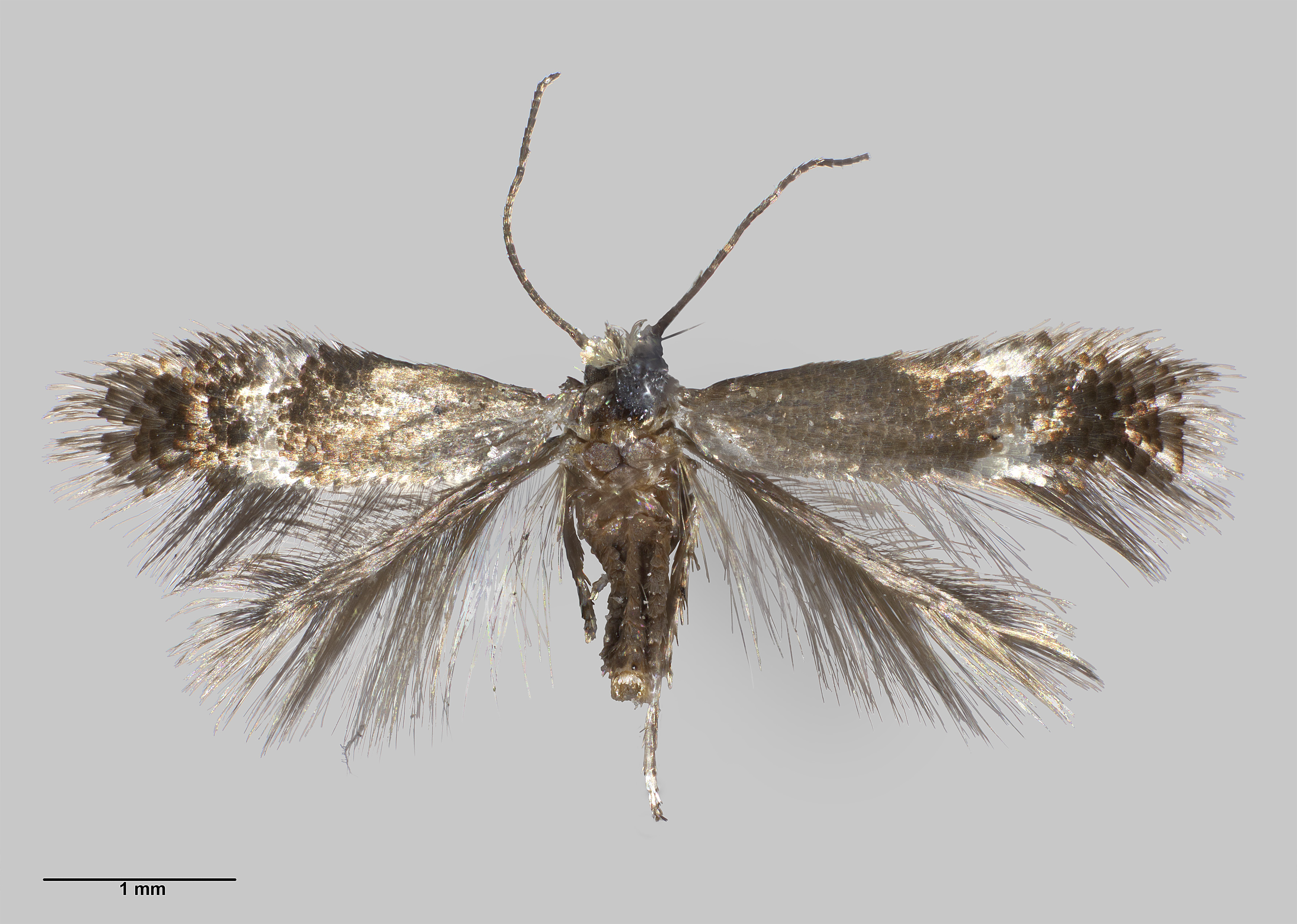
- Male type

Scientific classification
- Kingdom: Animalia
- Phylum: Arthropoda
- Class: Insecta
- Order: Lepidoptera
- Family: Nepticulidae
- Genus: Stigmella
- Species: S. lucida

Binomial name
- Stigmella lucida (Philpott, 1919)

Synonyms
- Nepticula lucida Philpott, 1919

= Stigmella lucida =

Species of moth endemic to New Zealand

Stigmella lucida, also known as the silver beech miner moth, is a species of moth of the family Nepticulidae. It was first described by Alfred Philpott. This species is endemic to New Zealand and is found in the North and South Islands. Its preferred habitat is native forest populated with its larval host species Nothofagus menziesii. Larvae of this species mine the leaves of its host plant. Adults are on the wing from September to January.

== Taxonomy ==
This species was originally described by Alfred Philpott in 1919 and originally named Nepticula lucida. George Hudson used that name when he discussed and illustrated this species in his 1928 book The butterflies and moths of New Zealand. In 1988 John S. Dugdale placed this species in the genus Stigmella. In 1989 Hans Donner and Christopher Wilkinson revised this species and confirmed its placement in that genus. The male holotype, collected at Waitati in Dunedin, is held at the Auckland War Memorial Museum.

== Description ==
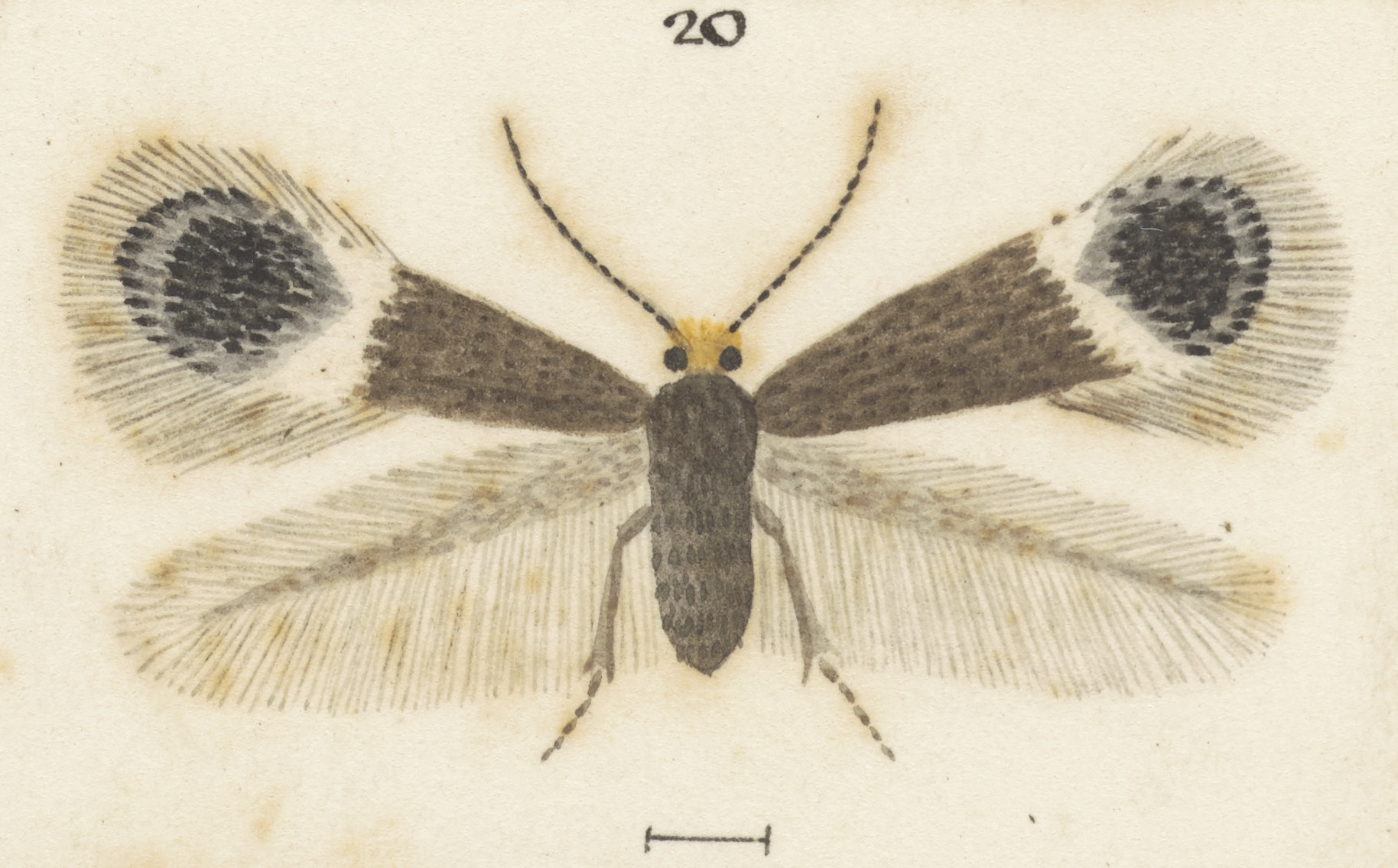
Illustration of S. lucida.

Larvae are about 3 mm (0.12 in) long and pale green.

The cocoon is made of white to pale brown silk and is constructed amidst foliage and branches of the food plant.

Philpott described the adults of this species as follows:

♂♀. 5 1/2–6 1/2 mm. Head greyish - white. Antennae black. Thorax fuscous. Abdomen black. Legs greyish-black. Forewings in ♂ elongate, rather broad basally, apex broadly rounded, in ♀ lanceolate, shining dark fuscous; a broad outwardly-curved white band at 3/5 : cilia fuscous. Hind-wings and cilia dull fuscous-black.

The adult of this species can be distinguished from similar appearing moths as a result of its distinctive white forewing fascia.

== Distribution ==
This species is endemic to New Zealand. It is found in both the North and South Islands.

== Behaviour ==
The larvae mine the leaves of their host plant, the silver beech. The mine starts close to the midrib near the stem as a narrow gallery. At first, only the lower part of the leaf tissue is eaten, but gradually, as the mine becomes wider, it reaches both cuticular layers. The frass is deposited in the middle of the mine, later filling all space. Larva have been recorded from May to August and in October and November.

Adults are on the wing in January and from September to December. There are one or two generations per year.

== Habitat and hosts ==
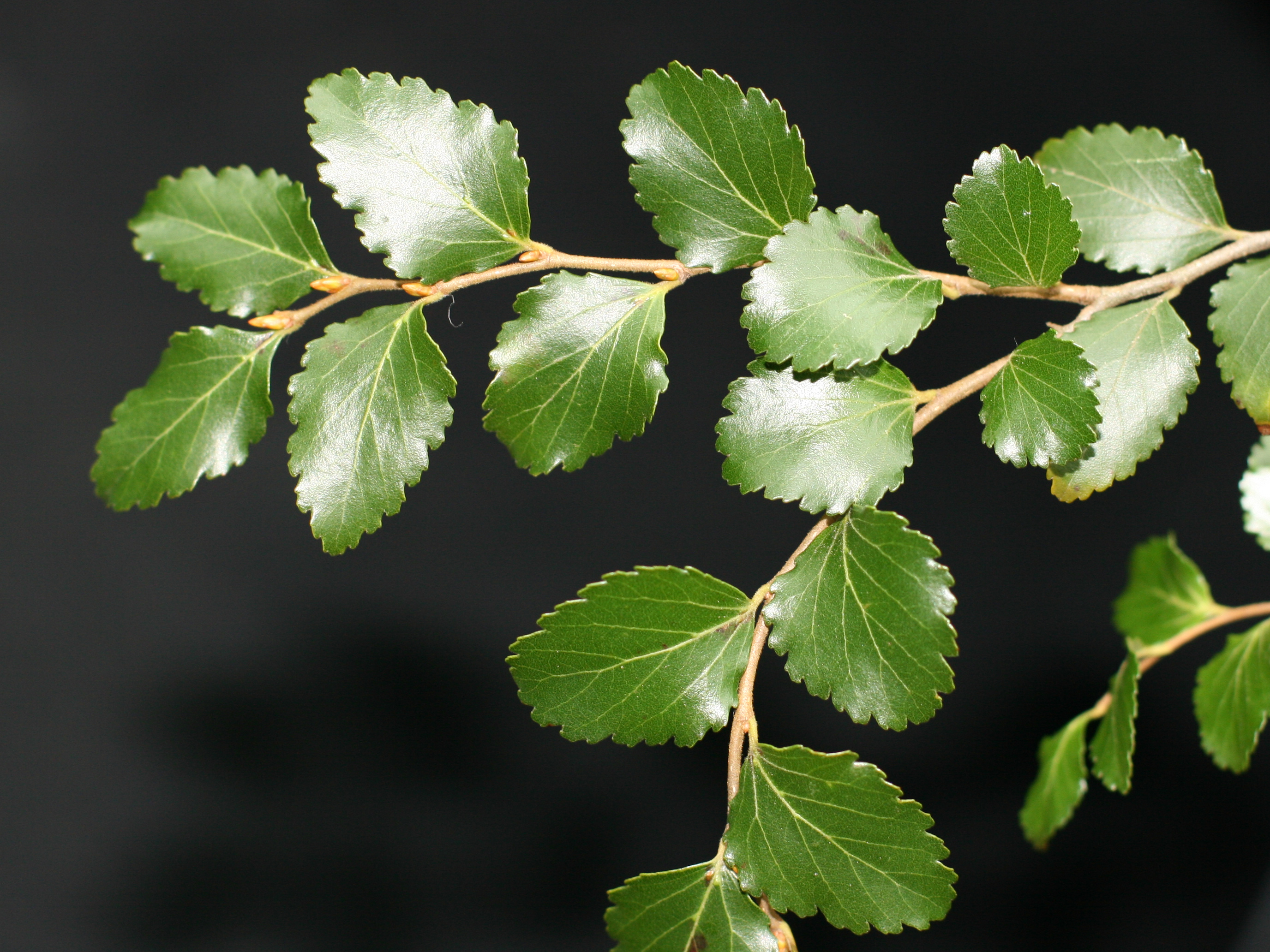
Leaves of the larval host Nothofagus menziesii.

This species inhabits beech forests containing its larval host species. The larvae feed on Nothofagus menziesii.
