= Stigmella flavipedella =

Scientific classification
- Kingdom: Animalia
- Phylum: Arthropoda
- Clade: Pancrustacea
- Class: Insecta
- Order: Lepidoptera
- Family: Nepticulidae
- Genus: Stigmella
- Species: S. flavipedella

Binomial name
- Stigmella flavipedella (Braun, 1914)

Synonyms
- Nepticula flavipedella Braun, 1914

Species of moth

Stigmella flavipedella is a moth of the family Nepticulidae. It is found in Ohio and Kentucky in the United States.

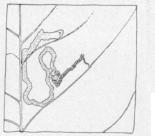
Mine

The wingspan is 3.6–5 mm. Adults are on wing in March, May and early June, and mid-July and August. Larvae have been collected in June and late July and in late August and September. There are three generations per year.

The larvae feed on Quercus species, including Q. platanoides, Q. palustris, Q. rubra and Q. imbricaria. They mine the leaves of their host plant.
