= Stigmella georgiana =

Scientific classification
- Kingdom: Animalia
- Phylum: Arthropoda
- Class: Insecta
- Order: Lepidoptera
- Family: Nepticulidae
- Genus: Stigmella
- Species: S. georgiana

Binomial name
- Stigmella georgiana Puplesis, 1994

Species of moth

Stigmella georgiana is a moth of the family Nepticulidae. It was described by Sco Puplesis in 1994. It is found in Georgia.
