= Stigmella turbatrix =

Scientific classification
- Kingdom: Animalia
- Phylum: Arthropoda
- Class: Insecta
- Order: Lepidoptera
- Family: Nepticulidae
- Genus: Stigmella
- Species: S. turbatrix

Binomial name
- Stigmella turbatrix Puplesis, 1994

Species of moth

Stigmella turbatrix is a moth of the family Nepticulidae. It is found in Turkmenistan and Tajikistan.

The larvae feed on Celtis species, including Celtis caucasica.
