= Stigmella crenatiella =

Scientific classification
- Kingdom: Animalia
- Phylum: Arthropoda
- Class: Insecta
- Order: Lepidoptera
- Family: Nepticulidae
- Genus: Stigmella
- Species: S. crenatiella

Binomial name
- Stigmella crenatiella Hirano, 2010

Species of moth

Stigmella crenatiella is a moth of the family Nepticulidae. It was described by Hirano in 2010. It is known from Japan (Honshū).

The larvae feed on Castanea crenata. They probably mine the leaves of their host plant.
