= Stigmella ebbenielseni =

Scientific classification
- Kingdom: Animalia
- Phylum: Arthropoda
- Clade: Pancrustacea
- Class: Insecta
- Order: Lepidoptera
- Family: Nepticulidae
- Genus: Stigmella
- Species: S. ebbenielseni

Binomial name
- Stigmella ebbenielseni van Nieukerken & van den Berg, 2003

Species of moth

Stigmella ebbenielseni is a moth of the family Nepticulidae. It is only known from Guam, Tinian and Alamagan.

The larvae feed on Pipturus argenteus. They mine the leaves of their host plant.
