= Stigmella kimae =

Scientific classification
- Kingdom: Animalia
- Phylum: Arthropoda
- Class: Insecta
- Order: Lepidoptera
- Family: Nepticulidae
- Genus: Stigmella
- Species: S. kimae

Binomial name
- Stigmella kimae Puplesis & Robinson, 2000

Species of moth

Stigmella kimae is a moth of the family Nepticulidae. It is known from Belize.
