= Stigmella tenebrica =

Scientific classification
- Kingdom: Animalia
- Phylum: Arthropoda
- Class: Insecta
- Order: Lepidoptera
- Family: Nepticulidae
- Genus: Stigmella
- Species: S. tenebrica

Binomial name
- Stigmella tenebrica Puplesis & Diškus, 2003

Species of moth

Stigmella tenebrica is a moth of the family Nepticulidae. It is known from Nepal.
