= Stigmella allophylivora =

Scientific classification
- Kingdom: Animalia
- Phylum: Arthropoda
- Class: Insecta
- Order: Lepidoptera
- Family: Nepticulidae
- Genus: Stigmella
- Species: S. allophylivora

Binomial name
- Stigmella allophylivora Gustafsson, 1985

Species of moth

Stigmella allophylivora is a moth of the family Nepticulidae. It was described by Gustafsson in 1985. It is found in Gambia.

The larvae feed on Allophylus cf africanus species. They probably mine the leaves of their host plant.
