= Stigmella rubeta =

Scientific classification
- Kingdom: Animalia
- Phylum: Arthropoda
- Class: Insecta
- Order: Lepidoptera
- Family: Nepticulidae
- Genus: Stigmella
- Species: S. rubeta

Binomial name
- Stigmella rubeta Puplesis & Diškus, 2002

Species of moth

Stigmella rubeta is a moth of the family Nepticulidae. It is found in tropical montane forest of the western slopes of the Andes in Ecuador.

== Description ==
The wingspan is about 4.5 mm. Adults have been found from February to early March.

The larvae feed on Rubus species. They mine the leaves of their host plant.
