= Stigmella slingerlandella =

Scientific classification
- Kingdom: Animalia
- Phylum: Arthropoda
- Clade: Pancrustacea
- Class: Insecta
- Order: Lepidoptera
- Family: Nepticulidae
- Genus: Stigmella
- Species: S. slingerlandella

Binomial name
- Stigmella slingerlandella (Kearfott, 1908)

Synonyms
- Nepticula slingerlandella Kearfott, 1908

Species of moth

Stigmella slingerlandella, the plum leaf miner, is a moth of the family Nepticulidae. It is found in North America from Ontario, New York, Michigan and Ohio, possibly south to Florida. It was named in honour of Mark Vernon Slingerland.

The wingspan is 3.5–5 mm.

The larvae feed on Prunus species, including Prunus nigra and Prunus serotina species. They mine the leaves of their host plant. The larva first eats a narrow linear mine, then widens the mine so as to produce an irregular, more or less ovate blotch. Three to twelve mines are often found on a single leaf. When full grown the larva leaves the mine through a cut in the upper surface of the leaf, falls to the ground, and there constructs a small flattened brownish cocoon in cracks in the soil, under loose stones, or between the base of the tree and the surrounding soil.
