= Stigmella guittonae =

Scientific classification
- Kingdom: Animalia
- Phylum: Arthropoda
- Class: Insecta
- Order: Lepidoptera
- Family: Nepticulidae
- Genus: Stigmella
- Species: S. guittonae

Binomial name
- Stigmella guittonae (Bourquin, 1962)

Species of moth

Stigmella guittonae is a moth of the family Nepticulidae. It is known from Argentina.

The larvae feed on Senecio bonariensis and Jussiaea longifolia. They probably mine the leaves of their host plant.
