= Stigmella ipomoeella =

Scientific classification
- Kingdom: Animalia
- Phylum: Arthropoda
- Class: Insecta
- Order: Lepidoptera
- Family: Nepticulidae
- Genus: Stigmella
- Species: S. ipomoeella

Binomial name
- Stigmella ipomoeella (Gustafsson, 1976)

Species of moth

Stigmella ipomoeella is a moth of the family Nepticulidae. It is known from Sri Lanka.

The larvae feed on Ipomoea species. They probably mine the leaves of their host plant.
