= Stigmella oligosperma =

Scientific classification
- Kingdom: Animalia
- Phylum: Arthropoda
- Class: Insecta
- Order: Lepidoptera
- Family: Nepticulidae
- Genus: Stigmella
- Species: S. oligosperma

Binomial name
- Stigmella oligosperma (Meyrick, 1934)

Synonyms
- Nepticula oligosperma Meyrick, 1934

Species of moth

Stigmella oligosperma is a moth of the family Nepticulidae.
