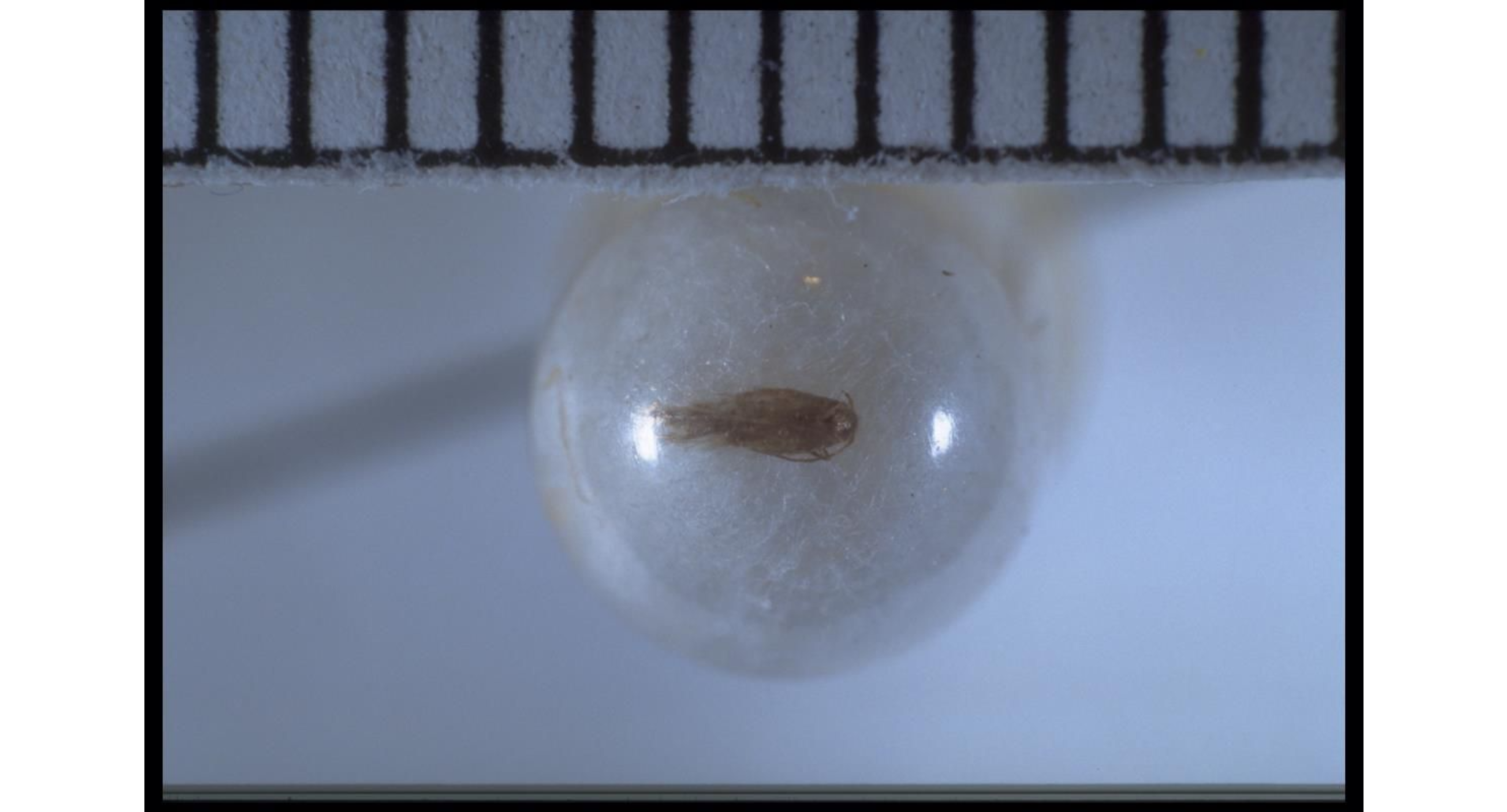
- Holotype

Scientific classification
- Kingdom: Animalia
- Phylum: Arthropoda
- Clade: Pancrustacea
- Class: Insecta
- Order: Lepidoptera
- Family: Nepticulidae
- Genus: Stigmella
- Species: S. palaga

Binomial name
- Stigmella palaga Donner & Wilkinson, 1989

= Stigmella palaga =

Species of moth endemic of New Zealand

Stigmella palaga is a species of moth in the family Nepticulidae. It was first described by Hans Donner and Christopher Wilkinson in 1989. It is endemic to New Zealand and is found in Stewart Island. This species inhabits native bush and possible host of this species is Dracophyllum longifolium.

== Taxonomy ==
This species was first described by Hans Donner and Christopher Wilkinson in 1989 and named Stigmella palaga. This placement was again confirmed in a 2016 revision of the global species placed in the family Nepticulidae. The male holotype specimen collected at Rakeahua Valley in Stewart Island in February is held at the New Zealand Arthropod Collection.

== Description ==
Donner and Wilkinson described this species as follows:

Head. Frontal tuft, scape, and collar white; antenna golden brown, comprising about 25 segments. Thorax golden brown; forewing golden brown, lustrous, reflecting gold; fringe concolorous. Abdomen golden brown.

This species can be distinguished from other species in genus as it has no wing markings and has a smooth, golden colour. As at 1989 the female was unknown.

== Distribution ==
This species is endemic to New Zealand. It is found on Stewart Island.

== Habitat and host species ==
This species inhabits native bush. A possible host of this species is Dracophyllum longifolium.
