= Stigmella morivora =

Scientific classification
- Kingdom: Animalia
- Phylum: Arthropoda
- Clade: Pancrustacea
- Class: Insecta
- Order: Lepidoptera
- Family: Nepticulidae
- Genus: Stigmella
- Species: S. morivora

Binomial name
- Stigmella morivora N. Hirano, 2010

Species of moth

Stigmella morivora is a moth of the family Nepticulidae. It was described by Hirano in 2010. It is known from Japan (Honshū).

The larvae feed on Morus bombycis. They probably mine the leaves of their host plant.
