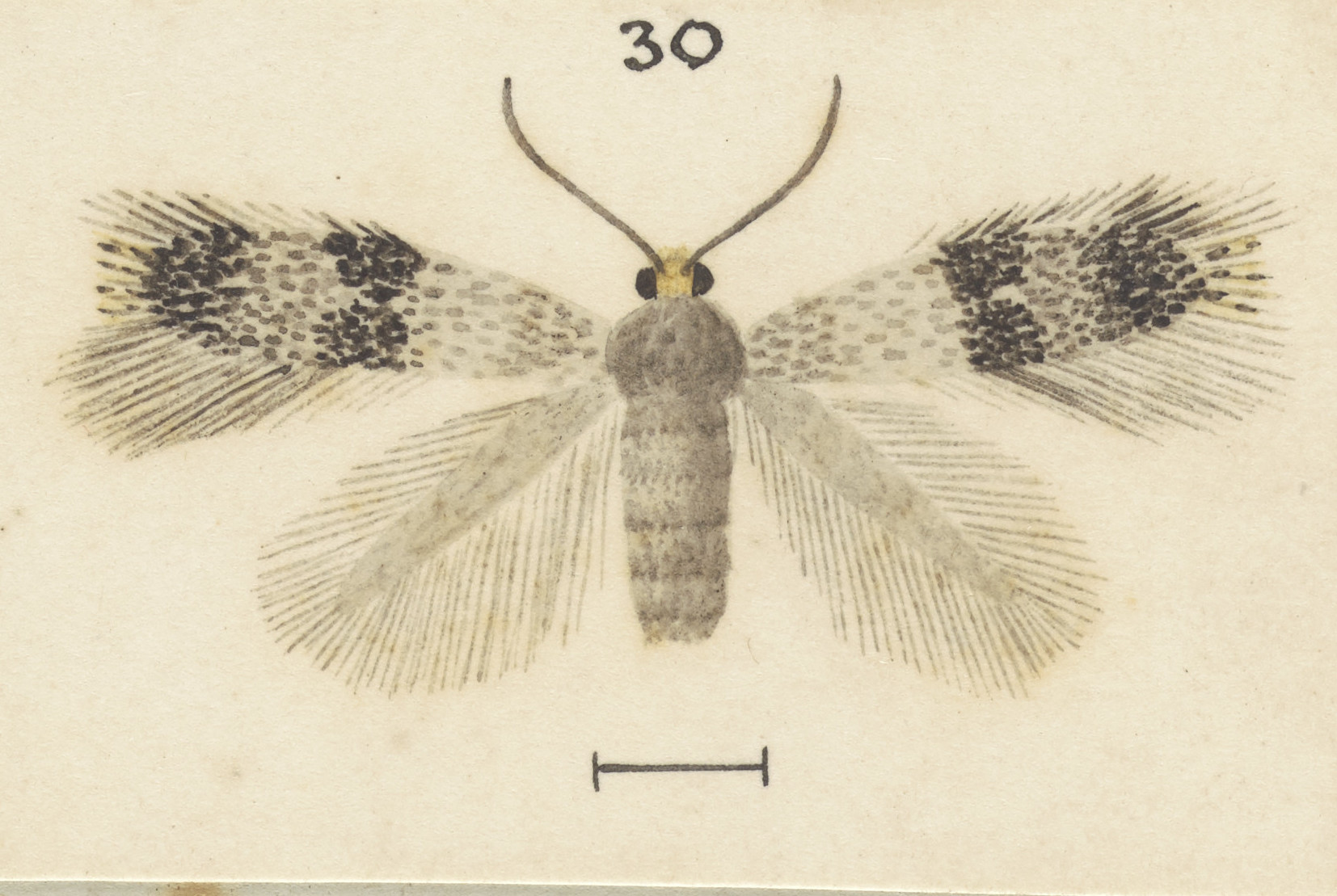

Conservation status
- Data Deficit (NZ TCS)

Scientific classification
- Kingdom: Animalia
- Phylum: Arthropoda
- Clade: Pancrustacea
- Class: Insecta
- Order: Lepidoptera
- Family: Nepticulidae
- Genus: Stigmella
- Species: S. progama

Binomial name
- Stigmella progama (Meyrick, 1924)

Synonyms
- Nepticula progama Meyrick, 1924

= Stigmella progama =

Species of moth endemic to New Zealand

Stigmella progama is a species of moth in the family Nepticulidae. This species is endemic to New Zealand and has only been collected on Bold Peak in the Humboldt Ranges, in Otago. Larvae are leaf miners although their larval host plant has yet to be determined. In 2025 this species was classified as "data deficient" under the New Zealand Threat Classification System.

== Taxonomy ==
This species was first described by Edward Meyrick in 1924 using a female specimen collected by George Hudson at Bold Peak near Lake Wakatipu in the Humboldt Mountains at 4,000 feet (1,200 m) on the 5 January. Meyrick named the species Nepticula progama. Hudson discussed and illustrated the species under that name in his 1928 publication The Butterflies and Moths of New Zealand. In 1988 John S. Dugdale assigned this species to the genus Stigmella. This placement was confirmed in 1989. However in 2025 this moth is regarded as being taxonomically unresolved. The female holotype specimen is held at the Natural History Museum, London.

== Description ==
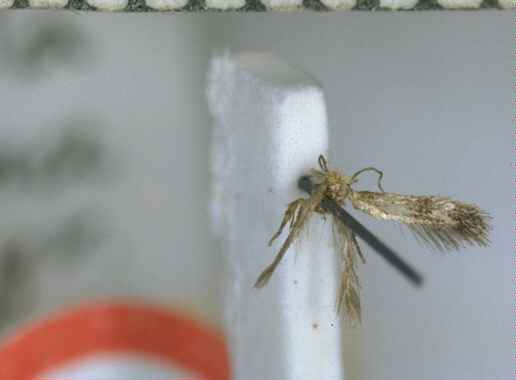
Female holotype.

Meyrick described this species as follows:

♀. 5 mm. Head white, occipital hairs yellowish. Thorax white, dorsally irrorated blackish and grey. Forewings white; basal fourth irrorated grey and blackish; irregular pale-grey costal and dorsal blotches irrorated blackish beyond middle, meeting in disc; an apical greyish blotch irrorated blackish, leaving apex itself whitish: cilia whitish-grey, round apex whitish, basal half sprinkled blackish. Hindwings and cilia grey.

Although similar in appearance to S. oriastra, S. progama can be distinguished as it has a submedial brown area on the forewing. As at 1989, male of the species has yet to be collected.

== Distribution ==
This species is endemic to New Zealand. It has only been found in its type locality in the Humboldt Mountains in Otago at approximately 1200 m. above sea-level.

== Biology and behaviour ==
Larvae of this species are leaf miners. Adults of this species are on the wing in January.

== Conservation status ==
In 2025 this species was classified by the New Zealand Department of Conservation as "data deficient" under the New Zealand Threat Classification System.
