= Stigmella saginella =

Scientific classification
- Kingdom: Animalia
- Phylum: Arthropoda
- Clade: Pancrustacea
- Class: Insecta
- Order: Lepidoptera
- Family: Nepticulidae
- Genus: Stigmella
- Species: S. saginella

Binomial name
- Stigmella saginella (Clemens, 1861)

Synonyms
- Nepticula saginella Clemens, 1862; Nepticula quercicastanella Chambers, 1873; Nepticula fuscocapitella Chambers, 1873

Species of moth

Stigmella saginella is a moth of the family Nepticulidae. It is found in North America in Ohio, New York, Virginia, Massachusetts, Illinois, Missouri, Pennsylvania, Kentucky, California, Ontario and Quebec.

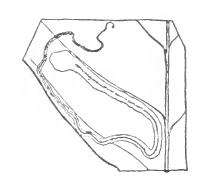
Mine

The wingspan is 4–5.5 mm.

The larvae feed on Quercus species, including Q. prinus, Q. platanoides and Q. alba. They mine the leaves of their host plant.
