= Stigmella johanssoni =

Scientific classification
- Kingdom: Animalia
- Phylum: Arthropoda
- Clade: Pancrustacea
- Class: Insecta
- Order: Lepidoptera
- Family: Nepticulidae
- Genus: Stigmella
- Species: S. johanssoni

Binomial name
- Stigmella johanssoni Puplesis & Diškus, 1996

Species of moth

Stigmella johanssoni is a moth of the family Nepticulidae. It is only known from the Tian Shan Mountains in southern Kazakhstan.

The length of the forewings is 2.3–2.6 millimetres (0.091–0.102 in). Adults were found in August, but are probably also on wing in early summer.
