= Stigmella prunifoliella =

Scientific classification
- Kingdom: Animalia
- Phylum: Arthropoda
- Clade: Pancrustacea
- Class: Insecta
- Order: Lepidoptera
- Family: Nepticulidae
- Genus: Stigmella
- Species: S. prunifoliella

Binomial name
- Stigmella prunifoliella (Clemens, 1861)

Synonyms
- Nepticula prunifoliella Clemens, 1862; Nepticula bifasciella Clemens, 1862; Stigmella bifasciella (Clemens, 1862); Nepticula serotinaeella Chambers, 1873

Species of moth

Stigmella prunifoliella is a moth of the family Nepticulidae. It is found in North America in Pennsylvania, Ohio, New York, Kentucky and Ontario.

Mine

The wingspan is 4–4.5 mm.

The larvae feed on Prunus species, including P. serotina, P. pensylvanica and P. nigra. They mine the leaves of their host plant.
