= Stigmella armeniana =

Scientific classification
- Kingdom: Animalia
- Phylum: Arthropoda
- Class: Insecta
- Order: Lepidoptera
- Family: Nepticulidae
- Genus: Stigmella
- Species: S. armeniana

Binomial name
- Stigmella armeniana Puplesis, 1994

Species of moth

Stigmella armeniana is a moth of the family Nepticulidae. It is found in Armenia.

The larvae feed on Rhamnus sintenisii. They probably mine the leaves of their host.
