= Stigmella subsorbi =

Scientific classification
- Kingdom: Animalia
- Phylum: Arthropoda
- Class: Insecta
- Order: Lepidoptera
- Family: Nepticulidae
- Genus: Stigmella
- Species: S. subsorbi

Binomial name
- Stigmella subsorbi Puplesis, 1994

Species of moth

Stigmella subsorbi is a moth of the family Nepticulidae. It is found in Tajikistan.

The larvae feed on Cotoneaster species.
