= Stigmella oritis =

Scientific classification
- Kingdom: Animalia
- Phylum: Arthropoda
- Class: Insecta
- Order: Lepidoptera
- Family: Nepticulidae
- Genus: Stigmella
- Species: S. oritis

Binomial name
- Stigmella oritis (Meyrick, 1910)

Synonyms
- Nepticula oritis Meyrick, 1910

Species of moth

Stigmella oritis is a moth of the family Nepticulidae. It is found from Himachal Pradesh in India.
