= Stigmella hissariella =

Scientific classification
- Kingdom: Animalia
- Phylum: Arthropoda
- Class: Insecta
- Order: Lepidoptera
- Family: Nepticulidae
- Genus: Stigmella
- Species: S. hissariella

Binomial name
- Stigmella hissariella Puplesis, 1994

Species of moth

Stigmella hissariella is a moth of the family Nepticulidae. It is found in Tajikistan.

The larvae feed on Crataegus species.
