= Stigmella hisakoae =

Scientific classification
- Kingdom: Animalia
- Phylum: Arthropoda
- Class: Insecta
- Order: Lepidoptera
- Family: Nepticulidae
- Genus: Stigmella
- Species: S. hisakoae

Binomial name
- Stigmella hisakoae Hirano, 2010

Species of moth

Stigmella hisakoae is a moth of the family Nepticulidae. It was described by Sco Hirano in 2010. It is found in Japan (Honshū).

The larvae feed on Quercus serrata. They probably mine the leaves of their host.
