= Stigmella lithocarpella =

Scientific classification
- Kingdom: Animalia
- Phylum: Arthropoda
- Clade: Pancrustacea
- Class: Insecta
- Order: Lepidoptera
- Family: Nepticulidae
- Genus: Stigmella
- Species: S. lithocarpella

Binomial name
- Stigmella lithocarpella van Nieukerken & Y.Q. Liu, 2000

Species of moth

Stigmella lithocarpella is a moth of the family Nepticulidae. It is only known from Yunnan.

The wingspan is about 6.1 mm. Larvae have been found in October, adults were reared in November.

The larvae feed on Lithocarpus dealbatus. They mine the leaves of their host plant.
