= Stigmella styracicolella =

Scientific classification
- Kingdom: Animalia
- Phylum: Arthropoda
- Clade: Pancrustacea
- Class: Insecta
- Order: Lepidoptera
- Family: Nepticulidae
- Genus: Stigmella
- Species: S. styracicolella

Binomial name
- Stigmella styracicolella (Klimesch, 1978)

Synonyms
- Nepticula styracicolella Klimesch, 1978

Species of moth

Stigmella styracicolella is a moth of the family Nepticulidae. It is found on Rhodes and in the Near East.

The larvae feed on Styrax officinalis.
