= Stigmella auxozona =

Scientific classification
- Kingdom: Animalia
- Phylum: Arthropoda
- Class: Insecta
- Order: Lepidoptera
- Family: Nepticulidae
- Genus: Stigmella
- Species: S. auxozona

Binomial name
- Stigmella auxozona (Meyrick, 1934)

Synonyms
- Nepticula auxozona Meyrick, 1934

Species of moth

Stigmella auxozona is a moth of the family Nepticulidae. It is known from Java.
