= Stigmella fibigeri =

Scientific classification
- Kingdom: Animalia
- Phylum: Arthropoda
- Clade: Pancrustacea
- Class: Insecta
- Order: Lepidoptera
- Family: Nepticulidae
- Genus: Stigmella
- Species: S. fibigeri

Binomial name
- Stigmella fibigeri Puplesis & Diškus, 2003

Species of moth

Stigmella fibigeri is a moth of the family Nepticulidae. It was described by Puplesis and Diškus in 2003. It is endemic to Nepal where it is found on elevation of 2,950 metres (9,680 ft).
