= Stigmella bicuspidata =

Scientific classification
- Kingdom: Animalia
- Phylum: Arthropoda
- Clade: Pancrustacea
- Class: Insecta
- Order: Lepidoptera
- Family: Nepticulidae
- Genus: Stigmella
- Species: S. bicuspidata

Binomial name
- Stigmella bicuspidata van Nieukerken & Johansson, 2003

Species of moth

Stigmella bicuspidata is a moth of the family Nepticulidae. It is only known from three widely separate localities in Turkey.

The wingspan is 4.9–5 millimetres (0.19–0.20 in). Adults are on wing from July to September.
