= Stigmella amelanchierella =

Scientific classification
- Kingdom: Animalia
- Phylum: Arthropoda
- Clade: Pancrustacea
- Class: Insecta
- Order: Lepidoptera
- Family: Nepticulidae
- Genus: Stigmella
- Species: S. amelanchierella

Binomial name
- Stigmella amelanchierella (Clemens, 1862)

Synonyms
- Nepticula amelanchierella Clemens, 1862

Species of moth

Stigmella amelanchierella is a moth of the family Nepticulidae. This species was described by James Brackenridge Clemens in 1862 from mines on Amelanchier species found in June and July. This original (type) material was not preserved and there are no known bred specimens.

Vacated mines have been collected in Ohio, Kentucky and North Carolina in the United States.
