= Stigmella gutlebiella =

Scientific classification
- Kingdom: Animalia
- Phylum: Arthropoda
- Clade: Pancrustacea
- Class: Insecta
- Order: Lepidoptera
- Family: Nepticulidae
- Genus: Stigmella
- Species: S. gutlebiella

Binomial name
- Stigmella gutlebiella Laštuvka & Huemer, 2002

Species of moth

Stigmella gutlebiella is a moth of the family Nepticulidae. It was described by Laštuvka and Huemer in 2002. It is known from Golestan in Iran. It differs from related species by its distinct black androconial scales on the hindwing surface and by its characteristic male genitalia: broad gnathos with long distal processes, uncus with conspicuous corners and valva with long distal process.
