= Stigmella grandistyla =

Scientific classification
- Kingdom: Animalia
- Phylum: Arthropoda
- Class: Insecta
- Order: Lepidoptera
- Family: Nepticulidae
- Genus: Stigmella
- Species: S. grandistyla

Binomial name
- Stigmella grandistyla Puplesis, 1994

Species of moth

Stigmella grandistyla is a moth of the family Nepticulidae. It was described by Puplesis in 1994. It is known from Georgia.

The larvae feed on Pyrus species. They probably mine the leaves of their host plant.
