= Stigmella lanceolata =

Scientific classification
- Kingdom: Animalia
- Phylum: Arthropoda
- Class: Insecta
- Order: Lepidoptera
- Family: Nepticulidae
- Genus: Stigmella
- Species: S. lanceolata

Binomial name
- Stigmella lanceolata Puplesis, 1994

Species of moth

Stigmella lanceolata is a moth of the family Nepticulidae. It is found in Turkmenistan.
