= Stigmella semiaurea =

Scientific classification
- Kingdom: Animalia
- Phylum: Arthropoda
- Class: Insecta
- Order: Lepidoptera
- Family: Nepticulidae
- Genus: Stigmella
- Species: S. semiaurea

Binomial name
- Stigmella semiaurea Puplesis, 1988

Species of moth

Stigmella semiaurea is a moth of the family Nepticulidae. It is found in Turkmenistan and Tajikistan.

The larvae feed on Acer species.
