= Stigmella argyrodoxa =

Scientific classification
- Kingdom: Animalia
- Phylum: Arthropoda
- Class: Insecta
- Order: Lepidoptera
- Family: Nepticulidae
- Genus: Stigmella
- Species: S. argyrodoxa

Binomial name
- Stigmella argyrodoxa (Meyrick, 1918)

Synonyms
- Nepticula argyrodoxa Meyrick, 1918

Species of moth

Stigmella argyrodoxa is a moth of the family Nepticulidae. It is known from Bengal in India.

The larvae feed on Desmodium species. They probably mine the leaves of their host plant.
