= Stigmella skulei =

Scientific classification
- Kingdom: Animalia
- Phylum: Arthropoda
- Class: Insecta
- Order: Lepidoptera
- Family: Nepticulidae
- Genus: Stigmella
- Species: S. skulei

Binomial name
- Stigmella skulei Puplesis & Diškus, 2003

Species of moth

Stigmella skulei is a moth of the family Nepticulidae. It was described by Puplesis and Diškus in 2003. It is known from the northern region of Oman.
