= Stigmella alicia =

Scientific classification
- Kingdom: Animalia
- Phylum: Arthropoda
- Class: Insecta
- Order: Lepidoptera
- Family: Nepticulidae
- Genus: Stigmella
- Species: S. alicia

Binomial name
- Stigmella alicia (Meyrick, 1928)

Synonyms
- Nepticula alicia Meyrick, 1928

Species of moth

Stigmella alicia is a moth of the family Nepticulidae. It is known from Thailand.
