= Stigmella karsholti =

Scientific classification
- Kingdom: Animalia
- Phylum: Arthropoda
- Clade: Pancrustacea
- Class: Insecta
- Order: Lepidoptera
- Family: Nepticulidae
- Genus: Stigmella
- Species: S. karsholti

Binomial name
- Stigmella karsholti van Nieukerken & Johansson, 2003

Species of moth

Stigmella karsholti is a moth of the family Nepticulidae. They are found in oak forests near Ain Draham, Tunisia.

The wingspan is 5.7–6.8 millimetres (0.22–0.27 in). Adults are on wing in May.

The larvae feed on Quercus canariensis. They mine the leaves of their host plant.
