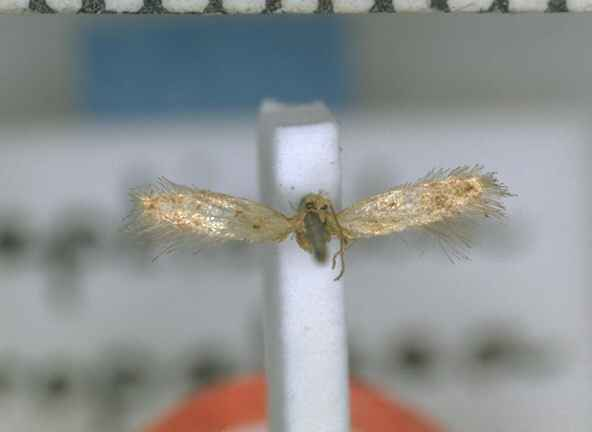
- Male holotype

Conservation status
- Data Deficit (NZ TCS)

Scientific classification
- Kingdom: Animalia
- Phylum: Arthropoda
- Clade: Pancrustacea
- Class: Insecta
- Order: Lepidoptera
- Family: Nepticulidae
- Genus: Stigmella
- Species: S. propalaea

Binomial name
- Stigmella propalaea (Meyrick, 1889)

Synonyms
- Nepticula propalaea Meyrick, 1889

= Stigmella propalaea =

Species of moth endemic to New Zealand

Stigmella propalaea is a species of moth of the family Nepticulidae. This species was first described by Edward Meyrick in 1889. It is endemic to New Zealand and has only been observed at Arthur's Pass. The larvae of this species are leaf miners. Adults are on the wing in January. In 2025 this species was classified as "data deficient" under the New Zealand Threat Classification System.

== Taxonomy ==
This species was described by Edward Meyrick in 1889 using a specimen collected at Arthur's Pass at 600m above sea-level. Meyrick originally named the species Nepticula propalaea. George Hudson discussed this species under that name in his 1928 publication The Butterflies and Moths of New Zealand. In 1988 John S. Dugdale assigned this species to the genus Stigmella. In 1989 Hans Donner and Christopher Wilkinson agreed with this placement in their monograph on New Zealand Nepticulidae. This placement was again confirmed in a 2016 revision of the global species placed in the family Nepticulidae. However in 2025 this moth is regarded as being taxonomically unresolved.

The holotype specimen is held at the Natural History Museum, London. This species is only known from its holotype and the specimen is in poor condition.

== Description ==
Meyrick described the species as follows:

♀. 7mm. Head, palpi, antennæ, and thorax whitish-ochreous. Abdomen light grey. Legs whitish-ochreous, anterior pair infuscated. Forewings lanceolate; whitish-ochreous, obscurely irrorated with brownish; a dark fuscous dot on fold at 1/4, a second in disc before middle, and a third immediately before apex: cilia whitish-ochreous. Hindwings light grey; cilia whitish-ochreous-grey.

== Distribution ==
It is endemic to New Zealand. This species is only known from its type locality of Arthur's Pass.

== Biology and behaviour ==
The adult moths are on the wing in January. As at 1989 the female of this species has yet to be collected.

== Conservation status ==
In 2025 this species was classified by the New Zealand Department of Conservation as "data deficient" under the New Zealand Threat Classification System.
