= Stigmella talassica =

Scientific classification
- Kingdom: Animalia
- Phylum: Arthropoda
- Class: Insecta
- Order: Lepidoptera
- Family: Nepticulidae
- Genus: Stigmella
- Species: S. talassica

Binomial name
- Stigmella talassica Puplesis, 1992

Species of moth

Stigmella talassica is a moth of the family Nepticulidae. It is found in Kazakhstan.
