= Stigmella cocciferae =

Scientific classification
- Kingdom: Animalia
- Phylum: Arthropoda
- Clade: Pancrustacea
- Class: Insecta
- Order: Lepidoptera
- Family: Nepticulidae
- Genus: Stigmella
- Species: S. cocciferae

Binomial name
- Stigmella cocciferae van Nieukerken & Johansson, 2003

Species of moth

Stigmella cocciferae is a moth of the family Nepticulidae. It is found from Greece to Turkey and Israel.

The wingspan is 4.9–7 mm. Adults are on wing from April to July and again from September to October.

The larvae feed on Quercus coccifera. They mine the leaves of their host plant.
