= Stigmella altella =

Scientific classification
- Kingdom: Animalia
- Phylum: Arthropoda
- Clade: Pancrustacea
- Class: Insecta
- Order: Lepidoptera
- Family: Nepticulidae
- Genus: Stigmella
- Species: S. altella

Binomial name
- Stigmella altella (Braun, 1914)

Synonyms
- Nepticula altella Braun, 1914

Species of moth

Stigmella altella is a moth of the family Nepticulidae. It is found in Ohio and Maine in the United States.

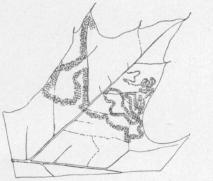
Mine

The wingspan is 5.6-6.4 mm. There is one generation per year in Ohio, with mines being collected in October and adults emerging the following May and early June.

The larvae feed on Quercus imbricaria and Quercus palustris. They mine the leaves of their host plant.
