= Stigmella dissona =

Scientific classification
- Kingdom: Animalia
- Phylum: Arthropoda
- Class: Insecta
- Order: Lepidoptera
- Family: Nepticulidae
- Genus: Stigmella
- Species: S. dissona

Binomial name
- Stigmella dissona (Puplesis, 1984)

Species of moth

Stigmella dissona is a moth of the family Nepticulidae. It is found in the Amur and Primorye regions of Russia.
