= Stigmella barbata =

Scientific classification
- Kingdom: Animalia
- Phylum: Arthropoda
- Clade: Pancrustacea
- Class: Insecta
- Order: Lepidoptera
- Family: Nepticulidae
- Genus: Stigmella
- Species: S. barbata

Binomial name
- Stigmella barbata Puplesis & Robinson, 2000

Species of moth

Stigmella barbata is a moth of the family Nepticulidae. It was described by Puplesis and Robinson in 2000 and is known from Las Cuevas, Belize where it is found in Chiquibul Forest Reserve. Formally described by Rimantas Puplesis and Gaden S. Robinson in 2000, it is endemic to Belize. It is known from the Chiquibul Forest Reserve in the Cayo District. It is a small species, with males having a wingspan of 4.4–4.5 mm (0.17–0.18 in) and a forewing length of 1.9–2.0 mm (0.075–0.079 in).

== Taxonomy ==
Stigmella barbata was formally described in 2000 by Rimantas Puplesis and Gaden S. Robinson based on an adult male specimen collected from the Chiquibul Forest Reserve in the Cayo District of Belize. It is part of the S. barbata species group within the genus.

== Description ==
Stigmella barbata is a small species, with males having a wingspan of 4.4–4.5 mm (0.17–0.18 in) and a forewing length of 1.9–2.0 mm (0.075–0.079 in). The forewing is brown with a slight golden shine. The cilia of the forewing are brown, with a similarly colored undersurface to the forewing. The hindwing is brown with similarly colored cilia. The thorax and tegulae are also brown in colour. The abdomen is fuscous above and cream-brown below. The head has cream palps and a brown frontal tuft. The legs are cream-coloured and the antennae are brown.

== Distribution ==
Stigmella barbata is endemic to Belize, where it is known from the Las Cuevas Biological Station in the Chiquibul Forest Reserve in the Cayo District.
