= Stigmella laquaeorum =

Scientific classification
- Kingdom: Animalia
- Phylum: Arthropoda
- Class: Insecta
- Order: Lepidoptera
- Family: Nepticulidae
- Genus: Stigmella
- Species: S. laquaeorum

Binomial name
- Stigmella laquaeorum (Dugdale, 1971)

Synonyms
- Nepticula laquaeorum Dugdale, 1971; Nepticula laqueorum (Dugdale, 1971); Stigmella laqueorum (Dugdale, 1971)

Species of moth endemic to New Zealand

Stigmella laquaeorum is a species of moth of the family Nepticulidae. It is endemic to New Zealand and has only been found on Snares Islands / Tini Heke. The egg is laid on the underside leaf. Larvae are leaf miners. There may be up to 20 mines per leaf. Larvae are present in all months. The cocoon is attached to fallen large debris or trunk bases. Adults have been recorded on the wing from late November to February. They are diurnal, flying only in the morning. This species is classified as "At Risk, Naturally Uncommon" by the Department of Conservation.

== Taxonomy ==
This species was originally described by John S. Dugdale under the name Nepticula laquaeorum. In 1988 Dugdale noted that the epithet laquaeorum was inadmissible and amended it to the spelling of laqueorum. He also placed the species within the genus Stigmella. The taxonomy of this species was also studied by Hans Donner and Christopher Wilkinson in 1989 who also used the epithet laqueorum. However in the 2016 revision of global species in Nepticulidae and Opostegidae the epithet laquaeorum was used. The holotype specimen is held at the New Zealand Arthropod Collection.

== Description ==
The larvae of this species are up to 6 mm long and pale green.

The adult moths have a forewing length of between 3–4 mm. This species is similar in appearance to its close relative Stigmella fulva. However it can be distinguished from that species as S. laqueorum has basally black costa and has no linear black scale marks on the discal cell area. S. laqueorum is also smaller and has more obvious wing markings than S. fulva.

== Distribution ==
This species is endemic to New Zealand. It can only be found on Snares Islands / Tini Heke.

== Host species ==
The larvae feed on Olearia lyallii.

== Conservation status ==
This species has been classified as having the "At Risk, Naturally Uncommon" conservation status under the New Zealand Threat Classification System.
