= Stigmella azuminoensis =

Scientific classification
- Kingdom: Animalia
- Phylum: Arthropoda
- Class: Insecta
- Order: Lepidoptera
- Family: Nepticulidae
- Genus: Stigmella
- Species: S. azuminoensis

Binomial name
- Stigmella azuminoensis Hirano, 2010

Species of moth

Stigmella azuminoensis is a moth of the family Nepticulidae. It was described by Hirano in 2010. It is known from Japan (Honshū).

The larvae feed on Quercus serrata. They probably mine the leaves of their host plant.
