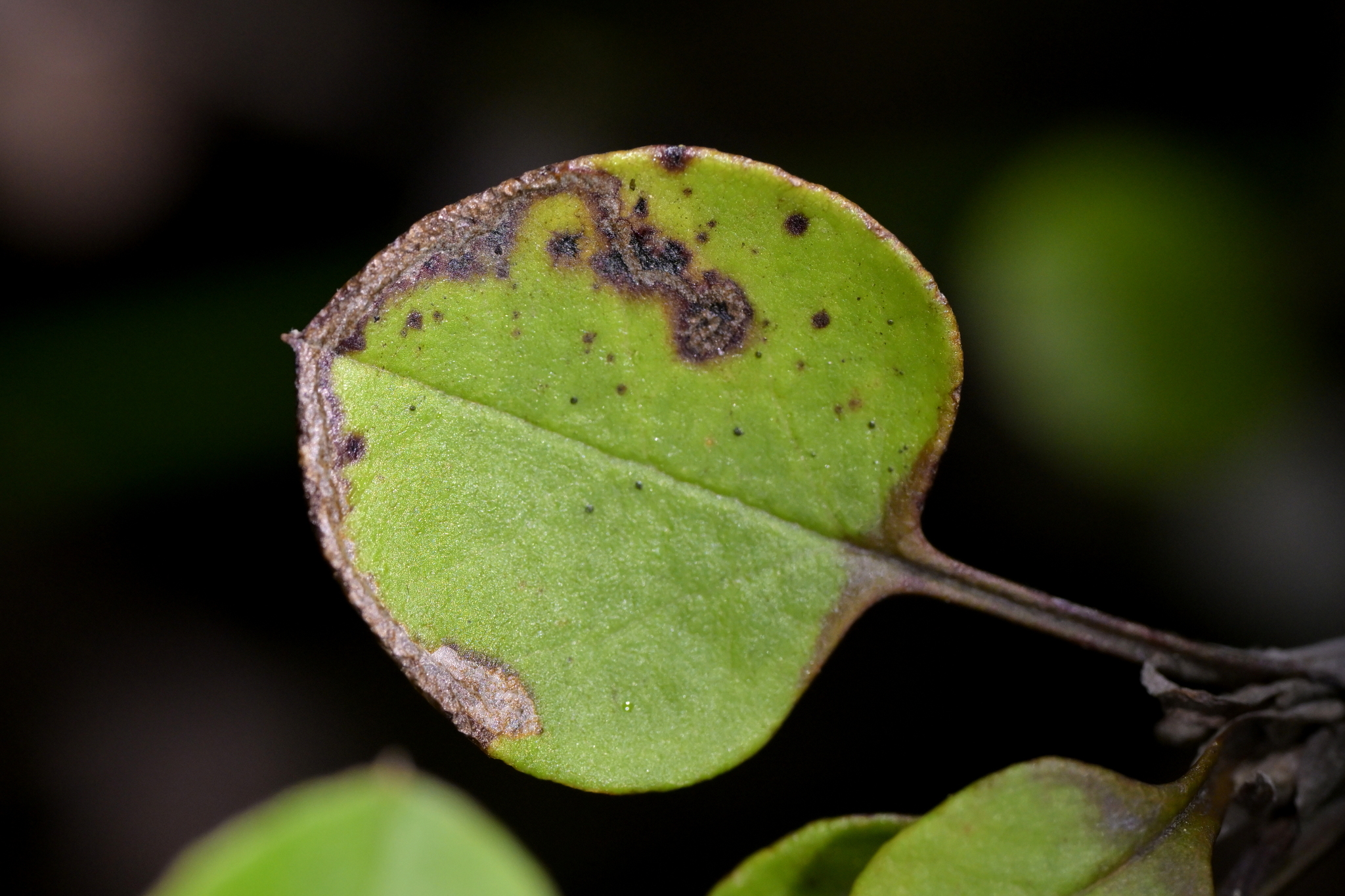
- Leaf mine of S. tricentra

Scientific classification
- Kingdom: Animalia
- Phylum: Arthropoda
- Class: Insecta
- Order: Lepidoptera
- Family: Nepticulidae
- Genus: Stigmella
- Species: S. tricentra

Binomial name
- Stigmella tricentra (Meyrick, 1889)

Synonyms
- Nepticula tricentra Meyrick, 1889

= Stigmella tricentra =

Species of moth endemic to New Zealand

Stigmella tricentra is a moth of the family Nepticulidae. It was first described by Edward Meyrick in 1889. This species is endemic to New Zealand and is found in both the North and South Islands. This species inhabits the margins of native forest as well as lowland shrublands where its larval host can be found. Larvae are leaf miners and feed on Helichrysum lanceolatum. Adults are on the wing in the wild in March and October. It is likely that this species has two generations in a year.

== Taxonomy ==
This species was first described by Edward Meyrick in 1889 using a specimen collected in Christchurch in March and was originally named Nepticula tricentra. George Hudson discussed that species under that name in his book The butterflies and moths of New Zealand. In 1988 John S. Dugdale placed this species in the genus Stigmella. In 1989 Hans Donner and Christopher Wilkinson agreed with this placement in their monograph on New Zealand Nepticulidae. This placement was again confirmed in a 2016 revision of the global species placed in the family Nepticulidae. The male holotype, collected at Lyttelton, is held at the Natural History Museum, London.

== Description ==
The larvae are pale yellow in appearance and have a length of between 3 and 4 mm. Their mines are wound in a compact manner with frass filling the mine. The cocoon is made of brown silk and is formed within the mine within the leaf which remains attached to the plant. Cocoons have been observed in May, August, September.

Meyrick described the female adult of this species as follows:

♀. 6 mm. Head and palpi grey-whitish. Antennae, thorax, and abdomen grey. Legs dark grey, apex of joints whitish. Forewings lanceolate; pale grey, irrorated with darker; two or three small round black dots in an irregular longitudinal series towards middle of disc : cilia light grey. Hindwings and cilia light grey.

Donner and Wilkinson described the adult male of this species as follows:

Head. Frontal tuft, scape, and collar white; antenna brown, comprising 36 segments. Thorax brown. Forewing about 2.6 mm long, speckled brown on cream ground colour, with a small black medial spot and a subterminal black spot sometimes extending distally; fringe golden grey. Hindwing silvery grey, lustrous, reflecting platinum; fringe concolorous. Abdomen grey.

The female is very similar in appearance than the male but has less than 33 segments to its antennae. Adults of this species can be distinguished from the similar appearing Stigmella species as it is of a smaller size.

== Distribution ==
This species is endemic to New Zealand. This species is found in both the North and South Islands.

== Behaviour ==
Larvae have been observed from April to September. Adults emerge through upper outermost layer of the leaf and have been observed on the wing in the wild in March and October. It is likely that this species has two generations in a year.

== Habitat and host species ==
This species inhabits the margins of native forest as well as lowland shrublands where its larval host can be found. The larvae feed on Helichrysum lanceolatum. They mine the leaves of their host plant.
