= Stigmella polydoxa =

Scientific classification
- Kingdom: Animalia
- Phylum: Arthropoda
- Clade: Pancrustacea
- Class: Insecta
- Order: Lepidoptera
- Family: Nepticulidae
- Genus: Stigmella
- Species: S. polydoxa

Binomial name
- Stigmella polydoxa (Meyrick, 1911)

Synonyms
- Nepticula polydoxa Meyrick, 1911

Species of moth

Stigmella polydoxa is a moth of the family Nepticulidae. It is indigenous to Peradeniya, Sri Lanka.

It is characterised by its small size of 3mm and a silvery tornal patch in cilia.
