= Stigmella naibabi =

Scientific classification
- Kingdom: Animalia
- Phylum: Arthropoda
- Clade: Pancrustacea
- Class: Insecta
- Order: Lepidoptera
- Family: Nepticulidae
- Genus: Stigmella
- Species: S. naibabi

Binomial name
- Stigmella naibabi Mey, 2004

Species of moth

Stigmella naibabi is a moth of the family Nepticulidae. It was described by Wolfram Mey in 2004. It is found in Namibia.
