= Åke Gustafsson =

Swedish botanist and geneticist

Karl Åke Torsten Gustafsson (1908–1988) was a Swedish botanist and geneticist, who was also known as an essayist and poet. He was professor at the Statens Skogsforskningsinstitut (the Swedish Institute for Forest Research) 1947–1968 and at Lund University 1968–1974.

In 1949 he was elected a member of the Royal Swedish Academy of Agriculture and in 1966 a member of the Royal Swedish Academy of Sciences.
