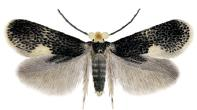
- Ectoedemia heringella

Scientific classification
- Kingdom: Animalia
- Phylum: Arthropoda
- Class: Insecta
- Order: Lepidoptera
- Family: Nepticulidae
- Subfamily: Nepticulinae
- Genus: Ectoedemia; Busck, 1907

Synonyms
- Ectodemia (misspelling); Dechtiria Beirne, 1945; Obrussa Braun, 1915; Laqueus Scoble, 1983

= Ectoedemia =

Genus of moths

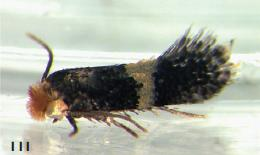
Ectoedemia heckfordi

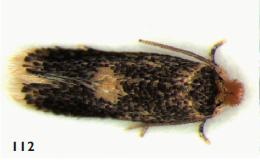
Ectoedemia heringella

Ectoedemia is a genus of moths in the family Nepticulidae. It consists of the subgenera Ectoedemia, Etainia, Fomoria and Zimmermannia. This genus was established by August Busck in 1907.

== Species ==
Note that some species have multiple entries, since they are found in different regions.

== Species found in Africa ==
- Ectoedemia alexandria Scoble, 1983
- Ectoedemia bicarina Scoble, 1983
- Ectoedemia capensis Scoble, 1983
- Ectoedemia commiphorella Scoble, 1978
- Ectoedemia craspedota (Vári, 1963)
- Ectoedemia crispae Scoble, 1983
- Ectoedemia crypsixantha (Meyrick, 1918)
- Ectoedemia denticulata Scoble, 1983
- Ectoedemia digitata Scoble, 1983
- Ectoedemia expeditionis Mey, 2004
- Ectoedemia furcella Scoble, 1983
- Ectoedemia fuscata (Janse, 1948)
- Ectoedemia gambiana (Gustafsson, 1972)
- Ectoedemia grandinosa (Meyrick, 1911)
- Ectoedemia guerkiae Scoble, 1983
- Ectoedemia gymnosporiae (Vári, 1955)
- Ectoedemia hobohmi (Janse, 1948)
- Ectoedemia incisaevora Scoble, 1983
- Ectoedemia indicaevora Scoble, 1983
- Ectoedemia insulata (Meyrick, 1911)
- Ectoedemia jupiteri Scoble, 1983
- Ectoedemia kharuxabi Mey, 2004
- Ectoedemia knysnaensis Scoble, 1983
- Ectoedemia kowynensis Scoble, 1983
- Ectoedemia krugerensis (Scoble, 1983)
- Ectoedemia leptodictyae Scoble, 1983
- Ectoedemia limburgensis Scoble, 1983
- Ectoedemia lucidae Scoble, 1983
- Ectoedemia macrochaeta (Meyrick, 1921)
- Ectoedemia malelanensis Scoble, 1983
- Ectoedemia maritima Scoble, 1983
- Ectoedemia mauni Scoble, 1979
- Ectoedemia myrtinaecola Scoble, 1983
- Ectoedemia nigricapitella (Janse, 1948)
- Ectoedemia nigrimacula (Janse, 1948)
- Ectoedemia nigrisquama Scoble, 1983
- Ectoedemia nylstroomensis Scoble, 1983
- Ectoedemia oleivora (Vári, 1955)
- Ectoedemia pappeivora (Vári, 1963)
- Ectoedemia portensis Scoble, 1983
- Ectoedemia primaria (Meyrick, 1913)
- Ectoedemia psarodes (Vári, 1963)
- Ectoedemia rhabdophora Scoble, 1983
- Ectoedemia royenicola (Vári, 1955)
- Ectoedemia ruwenzoriensis (Bradley, 1965)
- Ectoedemia scabridae Scoble, 1983
- Ectoedemia scobleella Minet, 2004
- Ectoedemia simiicola Scoble, 1983
- Ectoedemia stimulata (Meyrick, 1913)
- Ectoedemia subnitescens (Meyrick, 1937)
- Ectoedemia tecomariae (Vári, 1955)
- Ectoedemia tersiusi Mey, 2004
- Ectoedemia thermae Scoble, 1983
- Ectoedemia uisebi Mey, 2004
- Ectoedemia umdoniella Scoble, 1983
- Ectoedemia undatae Scoble, 1983
- Ectoedemia vannifera (Meyrick, 1914)
- Ectoedemia wilkinsoni Scoble, 1983
- Ectoedemia zimbabwiensis (Scoble, 1983)

== Species found in Australia ==
- Ectoedemia hadronycha Hoare, 2000
- Ectoedemia pelops Hoare, 2000
- Ectoedemia squamibunda Hoare, 2000

== Species found in the Indo-Malayan ecozone ==
- Ectoedemia festivitatis van Nieukerken, 2008
- Ectoedemia glycystrota (Meyrick, 1928)
- Ectoedemia sporadopa (Meyrick, 1911)

== Species found in North and South America ==
The following species are found in North America:

- Ectoedemia acanthella Wilkinson & Newton, 1981
- Ectoedemia andrella Wilkinson, 1981
- Ectoedemia anguinella (Clemens, 1864)
- Ectoedemia argyropeza (Zeller, 1839)
- Ectoedemia canutus Wilkinson & Scoble, 1979
- Ectoedemia castaneae Busck, 1913 - American chestnut moth
- Ectoedemia chlorantis Meyrick, 1908
- Ectoedemia clemensella (Chambers, 1873)
- Ectoedemia coruscella Wilkinson, 1981
- Ectoedemia grandisella (Chambers, 1878)
- Ectoedemia heinrichi Busck, 1914
- Ectoedemia helenella Wilkinson, 1981
- Ectoedemia hypericella (Braun, 1925)
- Ectoedemia marmaropa (Braun, 1925)
- Ectoedemia mesoloba Davis, 1978
- Ectoedemia minimella (Zetterstedt, 1839)
- Ectoedemia nyssaefoliella (Chambers, 1880)
- Ectoedemia obrutella (Zeller, 1873)
- Ectoedemia ochrefasciella (Chambers, 1873) - hard maple budminer moth
- Ectoedemia phleophaga Busck, 1914 - phleophagan chestnut moth
- Ectoedemia piperella Wilkinson & Newton, 1981
- Ectoedemia platanella (Clemens, 1861) - sycamore leaf blotch miner
- Ectoedemia platea (Clemens, 1861)
- Ectoedemia populella Busck, 1907
- Ectoedemia pteliaeella (Chambers, 1880)
- Ectoedemia quadrinotata (Braun, 1917)
- Ectoedemia reneella Wilkinson, 1981
- Ectoedemia rubifoliella (Clemens, 1860)
- Ectoedemia sericopeza (Zeller, 1839)
- Ectoedemia similella (Braun, 1917)
- Ectoedemia trinotata (Braun, 1914)
- Ectoedemia ulmella (Braun, 1912)
- Ectoedemia virgulae (Braun, 1927)
- Ectoedemia weaveri (Stainton, 1855)

The following species are found in South America, but not in North America:

- Ectoedemia diskusi Puplesis & Robinson, 2000
- Ectoedemia fuscivittata Puplesis & Robinson, 2000
- Ectoedemia molybditis (Zeller, 1877)
- Ectoedemia repanda Puplesis & Diškus, 2002
- Ectoedemia tabulosa Puplesis & Diškus, 2002

== Species found in the Palearctic ecozone ==
The following species are found in Europe:

- Ectoedemia aegaeica Z. & A. Lastuvka & Johansson, 1998
- Ectoedemia aegilopidella (Klimesch, 1978)
- Ectoedemia agrimoniae (Frey, 1858)
- Ectoedemia albibimaculella (Larsen, 1927)
- Ectoedemia albifasciella (Heinemann, 1871)
- Ectoedemia algeriensis van Nieukerken, 1985
- Ectoedemia alnifoliae van Nieukerken, 1985
- Ectoedemia amani Svensson, 1966
- Ectoedemia andalusiae van Nieukerken, 1985
- Ectoedemia angulifasciella (Stainton, 1849)
- Ectoedemia arcuatella (Herrich-Schaffer, 1855)
- Ectoedemia argyropeza (Zeller, 1839)
- Ectoedemia atricollis (Stainton, 1857)
- Ectoedemia atrifrontella (Stainton, 1851)
- Ectoedemia caradjai (Groschke, 1944)
- Ectoedemia cerris (Zimmermann, 1944)
- Ectoedemia contorta van Nieukerken, 1985
- Ectoedemia coscoja van Nieukerken, A. & Z. Lastuvka, 2009
- Ectoedemia decentella (Herrich-Schaffer, 1855)
- Ectoedemia deschkai (Klimesch, 1978)
- Ectoedemia empetrifolii A. & Z. Lastuvka, 2000
- Ectoedemia eriki A. & Z. Lastuvka, 2000
- Ectoedemia erythrogenella (de Joannis, 1908)
- Ectoedemia euphorbiella (Stainton, 1869)
- Ectoedemia gilvipennella (Klimesch, 1946)
- Ectoedemia groschkei (Skala, 1943)
- Ectoedemia hannoverella (Glitz, 1872)
- Ectoedemia haraldi (Soffner, 1942)
- Ectoedemia heckfordi van Nieukerken, A. & Z. Lastuvka, 2009
- Ectoedemia hendrikseni A.Lastuvka, Z. Lastuvka & van Nieukerken, 2009
- Ectoedemia heringella (Mariani, 1939)
- Ectoedemia heringi (Toll, 1934)
- Ectoedemia hexapetalae (Szocs, 1957)
- Ectoedemia hispanica van Nieukerken, 1985
- Ectoedemia ilicis (Mendes, 1910)
- Ectoedemia intimella (Zeller, 1848)
- Ectoedemia jubae (Walsingham, 1908)
- Ectoedemia klimeschi (Skala, 1933)
- Ectoedemia leucothorax van Nieukerken, 1985
- Ectoedemia liebwerdella Zimmermann, 1940
- Ectoedemia liechtensteini (Zimmermann, 1944)
- Ectoedemia liguricella Klimesch, 1953
- Ectoedemia longicaudella Klimesch, 1953
- Ectoedemia louisella (Sircom, 1849)
- Ectoedemia luisae (Klimesch, 1978)
- Ectoedemia mahalebella (Klimesch, 1936)
- Ectoedemia minimella (Zetterstedt, 1839)
- Ectoedemia monemvasiae van Nieukerken, 1985
- Ectoedemia nigrifasciata (Walsingham, 1908)
- Ectoedemia obtusa (Puplesis & Diskus, 1996)
- Ectoedemia occultella (Linnaeus, 1767)
- Ectoedemia phaeolepis van Nieukerken, A. & Z. Lastuvka, 2009
- Ectoedemia phyllotomella (Klimesch, 1946)
- Ectoedemia preisseckeri (Klimesch, 1941)
- Ectoedemia pseudoilicis Z. & A. Lastuvka, 1998
- Ectoedemia pubescivora (Weber, 1937)
- Ectoedemia quinquella (Bedell, 1848)
- Ectoedemia reichli Z. & A. Lastuvka, 1998
- Ectoedemia rosae Van Nieukerken, 2011
- Ectoedemia rubivora (Wocke, 1860)
- Ectoedemia rufifrontella (Caradja, 1920)
- Ectoedemia septembrella (Stainton, 1849)
- Ectoedemia sericopeza (Zeller, 1839)
- Ectoedemia similigena Puplesis, 1994
- Ectoedemia spinosella (de Joannis, 1908)
- Ectoedemia spiraeae Gregor & Povolny, 1983
- Ectoedemia subbimaculella (Haworth, 1828)
- Ectoedemia suberis (Stainton, 1869)
- Ectoedemia terebinthivora (Klimesch, 1975)
- Ectoedemia turbidella (Zeller, 1848)
- Ectoedemia variicapitella (Chretien, 1908)
- Ectoedemia vincamajorella (Hartig, 1964)
- Ectoedemia viridissimella (Caradja, 1920)
- Ectoedemia vivesi A.Lastuvka, Z. Lastuvka & van Nieukerken, 2009
- Ectoedemia weaveri (Stainton, 1855)

The following species are found in the Palearctic ecozone, but not in Europe:

- Ectoedemia admiranda Puplesis, 1984
- Ectoedemia albida Puplesis, 1994
- Ectoedemia aligera Puplesis, 1985
- Ectoedemia arisi Puplesis, 1984
- Ectoedemia asiatica Puplesis, 1988
- Ectoedemia biarmata (Puplesis, 1994)
- Ectoedemia capesella (Puplesis, 1985)
- Ectoedemia cerviparadisicola Sato, 2012
- Ectoedemia chasanella Puplesis, 1984
- Ectoedemia christopheri Puplesis, 1985
- Ectoedemia degeeri van Nieukerken, 2008
- Ectoedemia ermolaevi Puplesis, 1985
- Ectoedemia flavimacula Puplesis & Diškus, 1996
- Ectoedemia hypericifolia (Kuroko, 1982)
- Ectoedemia ingloria Puplesis, 1988
- Ectoedemia insignata Puplesis, 1988
- Ectoedemia insularis Puplesis, 1985
- Ectoedemia ivinskisi Puplesis, 1984
- Ectoedemia lacrimulae Puplesis & Diškus, 1996
- Ectoedemia leptognathos Puplesis & Diškus, 1996
- Ectoedemia maculata Puplesis, 1987
- Ectoedemia nuristanica van Nieukerken, 1985
- Ectoedemia olvina Puplesis, 1984
- Ectoedemia ornatella Puplesis, 1984
- Ectoedemia ortiva Rocienė & Stonis, 2013
- Ectoedemia permira (Puplesis, 1984)
- Ectoedemia peterseni (Puplesis, 1985)
- Ectoedemia petrosa Puplesis, 1988
- Ectoedemia philipi Puplesis, 1984
- Ectoedemia picturata Puplesis, 1985
- Ectoedemia pilosae Puplesis, 1984
- Ectoedemia rosiphila Puplesis, 1992
- Ectoedemia sabina (Puplesis, 1985)
- Ectoedemia scoblei Puplesis, 1984
- Ectoedemia sinevi Puplesis, 1985
- Ectoedemia sivickisi Puplesis, 1984
- Ectoedemia tadshikiella Puplesis, 1988
- Ectoedemia tigrinella (Puplesis, 1985)
- Ectoedemia trifasciata (Matsumura, 1931)
