= Ectoedemia platea =

Scientific classification
- Kingdom: Animalia
- Phylum: Arthropoda
- Clade: Pancrustacea
- Class: Insecta
- Order: Lepidoptera
- Family: Nepticulidae
- Genus: Ectoedemia
- Species: E. platea

Binomial name
- Ectoedemia platea (Clemens, 1861)

Synonyms
- Nepticula platea Clemens, 1861

Species of moth

Ectoedemia platea is a moth of the family Nepticulidae. It was described by James Brackenridge Clemens in 1861. It is known from North America.

It was described from a larva feeding on Quercus species, and might be just a synonym, probably of Ectoedemia anguinella. The larva is described as purplish with a pale green vascular line and a row of reddish-brown dorsal dashes. However, the purple colour of the larva is not conclusive, as the colour is often produced in larvae which feed on leaves with autumnal colouration.
