= Ectoedemia pseudoilicis =

Scientific classification
- Kingdom: Animalia
- Phylum: Arthropoda
- Clade: Pancrustacea
- Class: Insecta
- Order: Lepidoptera
- Family: Nepticulidae
- Genus: Ectoedemia
- Species: E. pseudoilicis

Binomial name
- Ectoedemia pseudoilicis Z. & A. Lastuvka, 1998

Species of moth

Ectoedemia pseudoilicis is a moth of the family Nepticulidae. It is widespread in mainland Greece and also present on Crete and in Turkey.

The wingspan is 3.8-5.9 mm. Adults are on wing from April to July. There is one generation per year.

The larvae feed on Quercus coccifera. They mine the leaves of their host plant. In Greece, almost always occurring together with Ectoedemia haraldi.

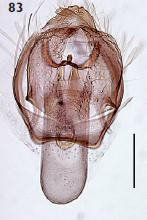
Male genitalia

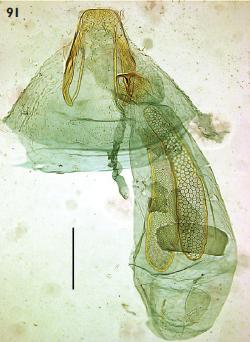
Female genitalia

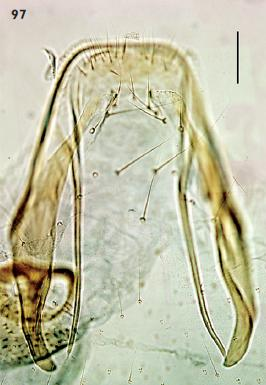
Female terminal abdominal segment
