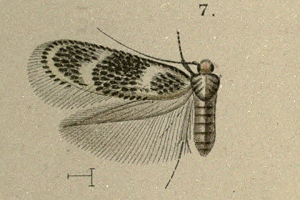

Scientific classification
- Kingdom: Animalia
- Phylum: Arthropoda
- Class: Insecta
- Order: Lepidoptera
- Family: Nepticulidae
- Genus: Ectoedemia
- Species: E. jubae

Binomial name
- Ectoedemia jubae (Walsingham, 1908)

Synonyms
- Stigmella jubae Walsingham, 1908

= Ectoedemia jubae =

Species of moth

Ectoedemia jubae is a moth of the family Nepticulidae. It is endemic to the Canary Islands.

The wingspan is 4.5-5.5 mm.

The larvae feed on Euphorbia balsamifera, Euphorbia obtusifolia and Euphorbia regis-jubae. They mine the leaves of their host plant.
