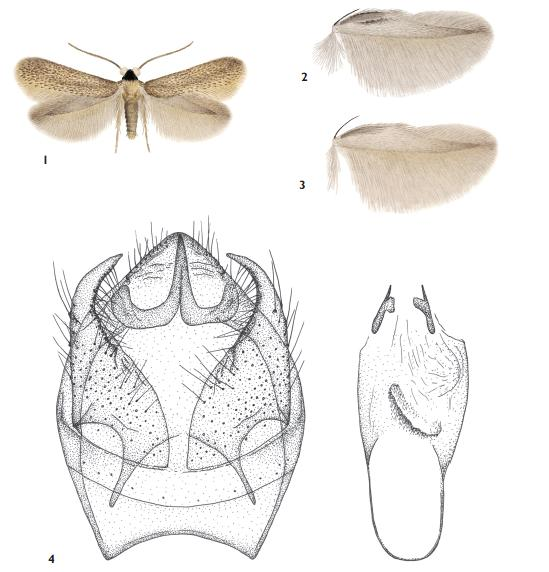
- male and male hindwing

Scientific classification
- Kingdom: Animalia
- Phylum: Arthropoda
- Clade: Pancrustacea
- Class: Insecta
- Order: Lepidoptera
- Family: Nepticulidae
- Genus: Ectoedemia
- Species: E. vivesi

Binomial name
- Ectoedemia vivesi A.Lastuvka, Z. Lastuvka & van Nieukerken, 2009

= Ectoedemia vivesi =

Species of moth

Ectoedemia vivesi is a moth of the family Nepticulidae. It is only known from Spain (Andalusia) and Cyprus.

== Taxonomy ==
Ectoedemia vivesi was formally described in 2009 as Ectoedemia (Zimmermannia) vivesi based on a male specimen collected in Málaga, Spain in 1994. It is named after Antonio Vives Moreno, who supported the studies of the scientists who described the species.

== Description ==
Adult males have a forewing length of 2.8 mm and a wingspan of 6.0–6.2 mm. The frontal tuft and collar of the head are black, the scape is white. The antennae are dark greyish-brown with 49–51 segments. The thorax is greyish-brown and has dark scales on the front of the body. The forewing is mainly greyish-ochreous, covered densely with brownish black scales, nearly continuously in the basal half. The cilia is greyish-ochreous, with an indistinct cilia-line. The underside is grey. The hindwing and its cilia are dark grey. The hair-pencils are pale grey-brown and measure about one third of the length of the wing. In Cypriot specimens, they are bordered with fuscous scales. The abdomen is grey-brown and the legs are ochreous-grey. There is no costal emargination.

Ectoedemia vivesi is similar in appearance to Ectoedemia hispanica, but has a greyish-brown thorax (not pale) and pale grey-brown hair-pencils on the hindwing (not white as in hispanica). Its male genitalia are very different from all other Zimmermannia species, differing by presence of only one pair of ventral carinae and simple triangular valvae.

== Distribution and ecology ==
Ectoedemia vivesi is native to Andalusia, Spain, and Cyprus. The species has been recorded in late June and early July from Mediterranean macchia. The species is thought to be a barkminer, perhaps of Quercus oaks.
