= Ectoedemia tigrinella =

Scientific classification
- Kingdom: Animalia
- Phylum: Arthropoda
- Class: Insecta
- Order: Lepidoptera
- Family: Nepticulidae
- Genus: Ectoedemia
- Species: E. tigrinella

Binomial name
- Ectoedemia tigrinella (Puplesis, 1985)

Synonyms
- Obrussa tigrinella Puplesis, 1985; Etainia tigrinella

Species of moth

Ectoedemia tigrinella is a moth of the family Nepticulidae. It is found in the Russian Far East (Primorskiy Kray).

The larvae probably feed on Acer species and probably mine the leaves of their host plant.

== Taxonomy ==
It was previously treated as a synonym of Ectoedemia trifasciata.
