= Ectoedemia empetrifolii =

Scientific classification
- Kingdom: Animalia
- Phylum: Arthropoda
- Class: Insecta
- Order: Lepidoptera
- Family: Nepticulidae
- Genus: Ectoedemia
- Species: E. empetrifolii

Binomial name
- Ectoedemia empetrifolii A. & Z. Lastuvka, 2000

Species of moth

Ectoedemia empetrifolii is a moth of the family Nepticulidae. It is found in Greece (Peloponnesus).

The larvae feed on Hypericum empetrifolium. They mine the leaves of their host plant.
