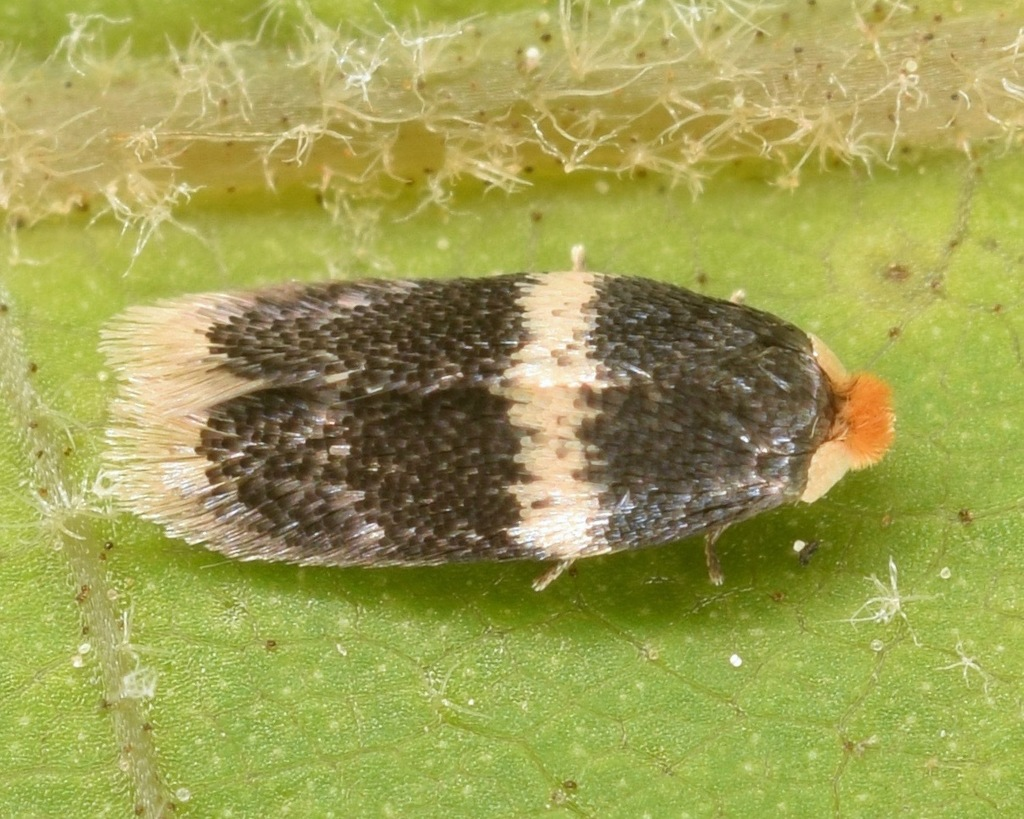

Scientific classification
- Kingdom: Animalia
- Phylum: Arthropoda
- Clade: Pancrustacea
- Class: Insecta
- Order: Lepidoptera
- Family: Nepticulidae
- Genus: Ectoedemia
- Species: E. ochrefasciella

Binomial name
- Ectoedemia ochrefasciella (Chambers, 1873)

Synonyms
- Nepticula ochrefasciella Chambers, 1873; Obrussa ochrefasciella (Chambers, 1873); Etainia ochrefasciella (Chambers, 1873)

= Ectoedemia ochrefasciella =

Species of moth

Ectoedemia ochrefasciella, the hard maple budminer moth, is a moth of the family Nepticulidae. It is found in North America, including Kentucky, Ohio, Pennsylvania and New Hampshire.

The wingspan is 6.5–8 mm.

The larvae have been recorded on Acer saccharum.
