= Ectoedemia ermolaevi =

Scientific classification
- Kingdom: Animalia
- Phylum: Arthropoda
- Class: Insecta
- Order: Lepidoptera
- Family: Nepticulidae
- Genus: Ectoedemia
- Species: E. ermolaevi

Binomial name
- Ectoedemia ermolaevi Puplesis, 1985

Species of moth

Ectoedemia ermolaevi is a moth of the family Nepticulidae. It was described by Puplesis in 1985. It is known from the Russian Far East.
