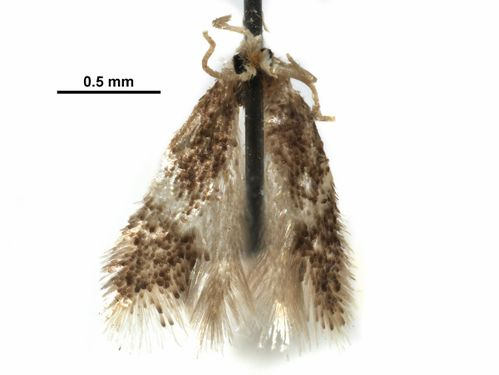

Scientific classification
- Kingdom: Animalia
- Phylum: Arthropoda
- Clade: Pancrustacea
- Class: Insecta
- Order: Lepidoptera
- Family: Nepticulidae
- Genus: Ectoedemia
- Species: E. ulmella

Binomial name
- Ectoedemia ulmella (Braun, 1912)

Synonyms
- Nepticula ulmella Braun, 1912

= Ectoedemia ulmella =

Species of moth

Ectoedemia ulmella is a moth of the family Nepticulidae. It is found in Kentucky and Pennsylvania in the United States.

Mine

The wingspan is 4–5 mm. There are two generations per year. Mature larvae are found in July and in September.

The larvae feed on Ulmus fulva and Ulmus thomasii. They mine the leaves of their host plant.
