= Ectoedemia ingloria =

Scientific classification
- Kingdom: Animalia
- Phylum: Arthropoda
- Clade: Pancrustacea
- Class: Insecta
- Order: Lepidoptera
- Family: Nepticulidae
- Genus: Ectoedemia
- Species: E. ingloria

Binomial name
- Ectoedemia ingloria Puplesis, 1988

Species of moth

Ectoedemia ingloria is a moth of the family Nepticulidae. It was described by Rimantas Puplesis in 1988. It is known from Tadzhikistan.
