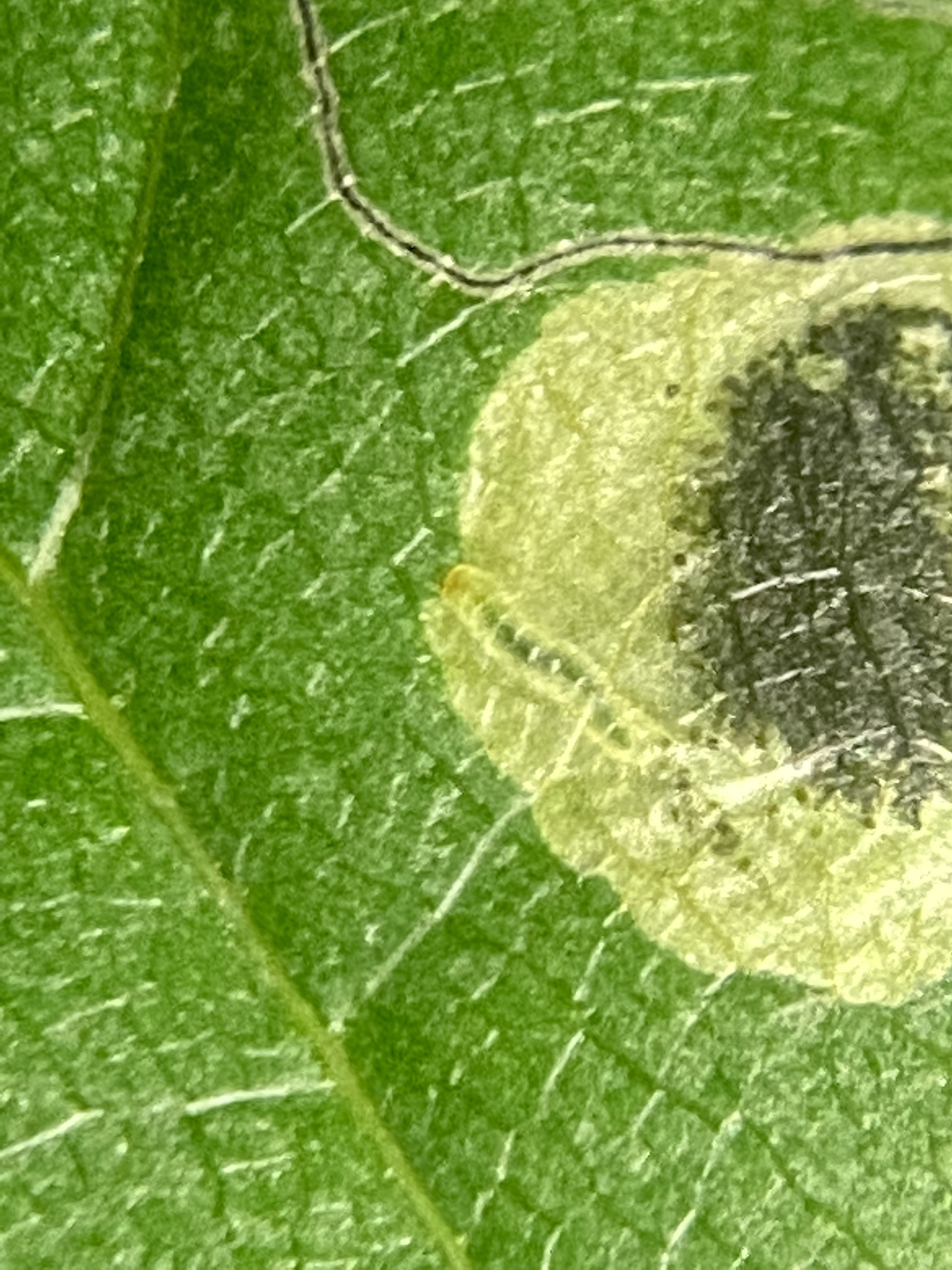
- Ectoedemia nyssaefoliella and leaf mine

Scientific classification
- Kingdom: Animalia
- Phylum: Arthropoda
- Clade: Pancrustacea
- Class: Insecta
- Order: Lepidoptera
- Family: Nepticulidae
- Genus: Ectoedemia
- Species: E. nyssaefoliella

Binomial name
- Ectoedemia nyssaefoliella (Chambers, 1880)

Synonyms
- Nepticula nyssaefoliella Chambers, 1880

= Ectoedemia nyssaefoliella =

Species of moth

Ectoedemia nyssaefoliella is a moth of the family Nepticulidae. It is found in Kentucky, Ohio and North Carolina in the United States.

The wingspan is 4.5–6 mm. There are two or three generations per year. The larvae of the first generation become full-grown in June.

The larvae feed on Nyssa sylvatica. They mine the leaves of their host plant.
