= Ectoedemia ornatella =

Scientific classification
- Kingdom: Animalia
- Phylum: Arthropoda
- Class: Insecta
- Order: Lepidoptera
- Family: Nepticulidae
- Genus: Ectoedemia
- Species: E. ornatella

Binomial name
- Ectoedemia ornatella Puplesis, 1984

Species of moth

Ectoedemia ornatella is a moth of the family Nepticulidae. It was described by Puplesis in 1984. It is known from the Russian Far East.
