= Ectoedemia insignata =

Scientific classification
- Kingdom: Animalia
- Phylum: Arthropoda
- Clade: Pancrustacea
- Class: Insecta
- Order: Lepidoptera
- Family: Nepticulidae
- Genus: Ectoedemia
- Species: E. insignata

Binomial name
- Ectoedemia insignata Puplesis, 1988

Species of moth

Ectoedemia insignata is a moth of the family Nepticulidae. It was described by Rimantas Puplesis in 1988. It is known from Tajikistan.
