= Ectoedemia hypericifolia =

Scientific classification
- Kingdom: Animalia
- Phylum: Arthropoda
- Class: Insecta
- Order: Lepidoptera
- Family: Nepticulidae
- Genus: Ectoedemia
- Species: E. hypericifolia

Binomial name
- Ectoedemia hypericifolia (Kuroko, 1982)

Synonyms
- Fomoria hypericifolia Kuroko, 1982

Species of moth

Ectoedemia hypericifolia is a moth of the family Nepticulidae. It was described by R.K. Puplesis in 1988. It was described from Kyushu, Japan, but is also known from Russia and China.

The larvae feed on Hypericum erectum, Hypericum attenuatum and Hypericum ascyron gebleri.
