= Ectoedemia spiraeae =

Scientific classification
- Kingdom: Animalia
- Phylum: Arthropoda
- Class: Insecta
- Order: Lepidoptera
- Family: Nepticulidae
- Genus: Ectoedemia
- Species: E. spiraeae

Binomial name
- Ectoedemia spiraeae Gregor & Povolny, 1983

Synonyms
- Ectoedemia jacutica Puplesis, 1988

Species of moth

Ectoedemia spiraeae is a moth of the family Nepticulidae. It is only known from Slovakia and the Mátra mountains in Hungary.

The wingspan is 4.8-5.6 mm. Adults have been reared from February to March and from May to June. There is probably one generation per year.

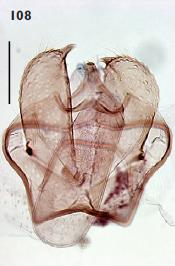
Male genitalia
