= Ectoedemia tabulosa =

Scientific classification
- Kingdom: Animalia
- Phylum: Arthropoda
- Class: Insecta
- Order: Lepidoptera
- Family: Nepticulidae
- Genus: Ectoedemia
- Species: E. tabulosa

Binomial name
- Ectoedemia tabulosa Puplesis & Diškus, 2002

Synonyms
- Fomoria tabulosa Puplesis & Diškus, 2002

Species of moth

Ectoedemia tabulosa is a moth of the family Nepticulidae. It is found in the lowland Amazon rainforest in Ecuador.

The wingspan is about 5.6 mm (0.22 in) for males. Adults have been collected in January.
