= Ectoedemia hypericella =

Scientific classification
- Kingdom: Animalia
- Phylum: Arthropoda
- Class: Insecta
- Order: Lepidoptera
- Family: Nepticulidae
- Genus: Ectoedemia
- Species: E. hypericella

Binomial name
- Ectoedemia hypericella (Braun, 1925)

Synonyms
- Nepticula hypericella Braun, 1925; Fomoria hypericella

Species of moth

Ectoedemia hypericella is a moth of the family Nepticulidae. It was described by Annette Frances Braun in 1925. It is known from North America, including Ohio.
