= Ectoedemia pelops =

Scientific classification
- Kingdom: Animalia
- Phylum: Arthropoda
- Class: Insecta
- Order: Lepidoptera
- Family: Nepticulidae
- Genus: Ectoedemia
- Species: E. pelops

Binomial name
- Ectoedemia pelops Hoare, 2000

Species of moth

Ectoedemia pelops is a moth of the family Nepticulidae. It is found near the Murray–Darling basin in New South Wales, Australia.

The larvae possibly feed on Capparis mitchellii. They probably mine the leaves of their host plant.
