= Ectoedemia hexapetalae =

Scientific classification
- Kingdom: Animalia
- Phylum: Arthropoda
- Class: Insecta
- Order: Lepidoptera
- Family: Nepticulidae
- Genus: Ectoedemia
- Species: E. hexapetalae

Binomial name
- Ectoedemia hexapetalae (Szocs, 1957)

Synonyms
- Nepticula hexapetalae Szocs, 1957

Species of moth

Ectoedemia hexapetalae is a moth of the family Nepticulidae. It is found in France, Austria and Hungary.

The wingspan is 3.7-4.7 mm. Adults are on wing in May. There are probably two generations per year.
