= Ectoedemia biarmata =

Scientific classification
- Kingdom: Animalia
- Phylum: Arthropoda
- Class: Insecta
- Order: Lepidoptera
- Family: Nepticulidae
- Genus: Ectoedemia
- Species: E. biarmata

Binomial name
- Ectoedemia biarmata (Puplesis, 1994)

Species of moth

Ectoedemia biarmata is a moth of the family Nepticulidae. It was described by Puplesis in 1994. It is known from Georgia.
