= Ectoedemia cerris =

Scientific classification
- Kingdom: Animalia
- Phylum: Arthropoda
- Class: Insecta
- Order: Lepidoptera
- Family: Nepticulidae
- Genus: Ectoedemia
- Species: E. cerris

Binomial name
- Ectoedemia cerris (Zimmermann, 1944)

Synonyms
- Nepticula cerris Zimmermann, 1944; Nepticula montissancti Skala, 1948

Species of moth

Ectoedemia cerris is a moth of the family Nepticulidae. It is found from the Czech Republic and Slovakia to Italy and Greece.

The wingspan is 5–5.3 mm. Adults are on wing in May. There is one generation per year.

The larvae feed on Quercus cerris. They mine the leaves of their host plant.
