= Ectoedemia fuscivittata =

Scientific classification
- Kingdom: Animalia
- Phylum: Arthropoda
- Class: Insecta
- Order: Lepidoptera
- Family: Nepticulidae
- Genus: Ectoedemia
- Species: E. fuscivittata

Binomial name
- Ectoedemia fuscivittata Puplesis & Robinson, 2000

Species of moth

Ectoedemia fuscivittata is a moth of the family Nepticulidae. It is only known from rainforests in Belize and Ecuador.

The wingspan is 4.1-4.3 mm for males. Adults are on wing in April in Belize and in January in Ecuador.
