= Ectoedemia albibimaculella =

Scientific classification
- Kingdom: Animalia
- Phylum: Arthropoda
- Class: Insecta
- Order: Lepidoptera
- Family: Nepticulidae
- Genus: Ectoedemia
- Species: E. albibimaculella

Binomial name
- Ectoedemia albibimaculella (Larsen, 1927)

Synonyms
- Nepticula albibimaculella Larsen, 1927

Species of moth

Ectoedemia albibimaculella is a moth of the family Nepticulidae. It is found from Fennoscandia to Italy.

The wingspan is 5–6 mm.

The larvae feed on Arctostaphylos uva-ursi. They mine the leaves of their host plant.
