= Ectoedemia maritima =

Scientific classification
- Kingdom: Animalia
- Phylum: Arthropoda
- Clade: Pancrustacea
- Class: Insecta
- Order: Lepidoptera
- Family: Nepticulidae
- Genus: Ectoedemia
- Species: E. maritima

Binomial name
- Ectoedemia maritima Scoble, 1983

Species of moth

Ectoedemia maritima is a moth of the family Nepticulidae. It was described by Scoble in 1983. It is known from South Africa (it was described from the Cape Province).

The larvae feed on Diospyros villosa.
