= Ectoedemia crypsixantha =

Scientific classification
- Kingdom: Animalia
- Phylum: Arthropoda
- Class: Insecta
- Order: Lepidoptera
- Family: Nepticulidae
- Genus: Ectoedemia
- Species: E. crypsixantha

Binomial name
- Ectoedemia crypsixantha (Meyrick, 1918)

Species of moth

Ectoedemia crypsixantha is a moth of the family Nepticulidae. It was described by Edward Meyrick in 1918. It is known from South Africa (it was described from Pretoria).
