= Ectoedemia incisaevora =

Scientific classification
- Kingdom: Animalia
- Phylum: Arthropoda
- Clade: Pancrustacea
- Class: Insecta
- Order: Lepidoptera
- Family: Nepticulidae
- Genus: Ectoedemia
- Species: E. incisaevora

Binomial name
- Ectoedemia incisaevora Scoble, 1983

Species of moth

Ectoedemia incisaevora is a moth of the family Nepticulidae. It was described by Scoble in 1983. It is known from South Africa (it was described from the Cape Province).

The larvae feed on Rhus incisa.
