= Ectoedemia cerviparadisicola =

Scientific classification
- Kingdom: Animalia
- Phylum: Arthropoda
- Class: Insecta
- Order: Lepidoptera
- Family: Nepticulidae
- Genus: Ectoedemia
- Species: E. cerviparadisicola

Binomial name
- Ectoedemia cerviparadisicola Sato, 2012

Species of moth

Ectoedemia cerviparadisicola is a moth of the family Nepticulidae. It is found in central Japan.

The larvae feed on Quercus gilva. They probably mine the leaves of their host plant.
