= Ectoedemia lacrimulae =

Scientific classification
- Kingdom: Animalia
- Phylum: Arthropoda
- Class: Insecta
- Order: Lepidoptera
- Family: Nepticulidae
- Genus: Ectoedemia
- Species: E. lacrimulae

Binomial name
- Ectoedemia lacrimulae Puplesis & Diškus, 1996

Synonyms
- Fomoria lacrimulae Puplesis & Diškus, 1996

Species of moth

Ectoedemia lacrimulae is a moth of the family Nepticulidae. It is only known from the western part of the Kopet Dag ridge in Turkmenistan.

The length of the forewings is 3.6-3.8 mm for males and down to 3.2 mm for females. Adults are on wing from May to June.
