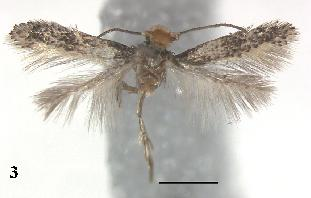

Scientific classification
- Kingdom: Animalia
- Phylum: Arthropoda
- Clade: Pancrustacea
- Class: Insecta
- Order: Lepidoptera
- Family: Nepticulidae
- Genus: Ectoedemia
- Species: E. degeeri

Binomial name
- Ectoedemia degeeri van Nieukerken, 2008

= Ectoedemia degeeri =

Species of moth

Ectoedemia degeeri is a moth of the family Nepticulidae. It is only known from Turkey.

The wingspan is 4.1-5.2 mm.

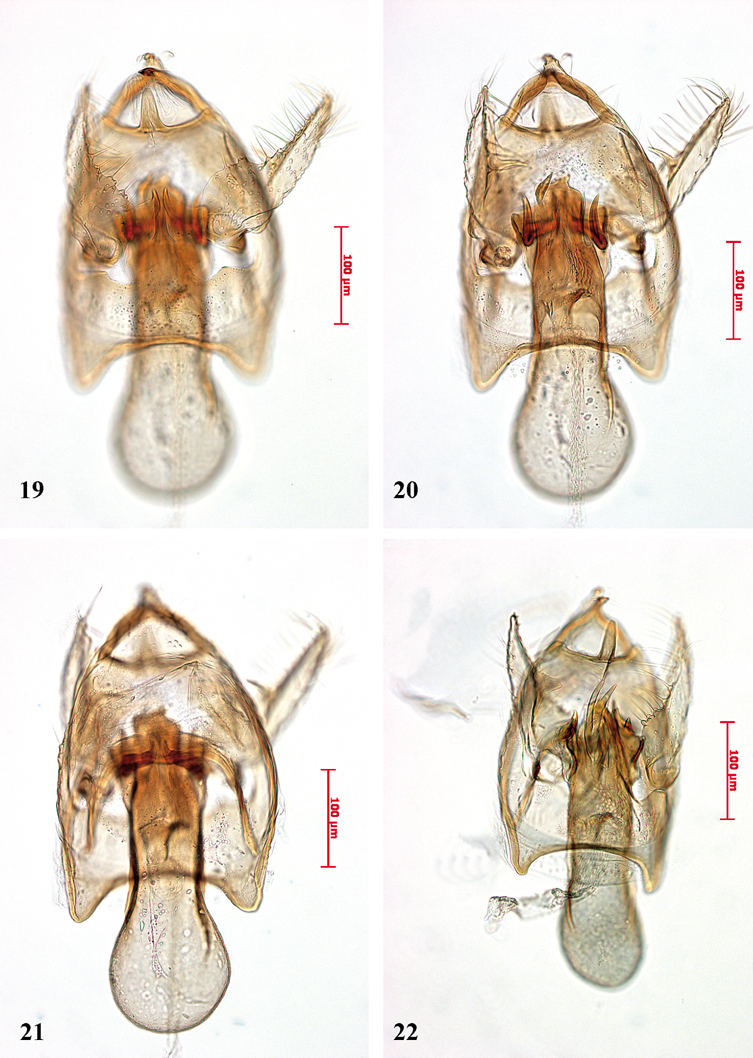
Male genitalia
