= Ectoedemia sporadopa =

Scientific classification
- Kingdom: Animalia
- Phylum: Arthropoda
- Class: Insecta
- Order: Lepidoptera
- Family: Nepticulidae
- Genus: Ectoedemia
- Species: E. sporadopa

Binomial name
- Ectoedemia sporadopa (Meyrick, 1911)

Synonyms
- Nepticula sporadopa Meyrick, 1911

Species of moth

Ectoedemia sporadopa is a moth of the family Nepticulidae. It was described by Edward Meyrick in 1911. It is known from Sri Lanka.

This species has a wingspan of 5 mm. The forewings are whitish ochreous, sprinkled with dark fuscous.
