= Ectoedemia hadronycha =

Scientific classification
- Kingdom: Animalia
- Phylum: Arthropoda
- Class: Insecta
- Order: Lepidoptera
- Family: Nepticulidae
- Genus: Ectoedemia
- Species: E. hadronycha

Binomial name
- Ectoedemia hadronycha Hoare, 2000

Species of moth

Ectoedemia hadronycha is a moth of the family Nepticulidae and belongs to the Fomoria subgenus of Ectoedemia. It is endemic to Australia, where it is found along the north-eastern coast of Queensland.

The larvae feed on Capparis arborea, of which they mine the leaves. Eggs are found on the upper side of the leaves.
