= Ectoedemia deschkai =

Scientific classification
- Kingdom: Animalia
- Phylum: Arthropoda
- Clade: Pancrustacea
- Class: Insecta
- Order: Lepidoptera
- Family: Nepticulidae
- Genus: Ectoedemia
- Species: E. deschkai

Binomial name
- Ectoedemia deschkai (Klimesch, 1978)

Synonyms
- Fomoria deschkai Klimesch, 1978

Species of moth

Ectoedemia deschkai is a moth of the family Nepticulidae. It is found in Greece (the mainland and the Aegean Islands).

The larvae feed on Hypericum hircinum and Hypericum triquetrifolium. They mine the leaves of their host plant.
