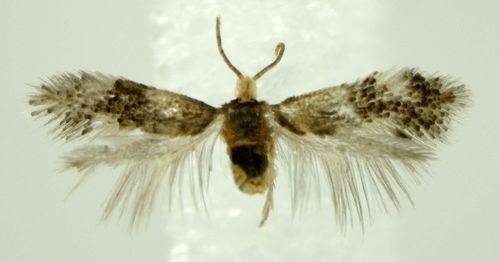

Scientific classification
- Kingdom: Animalia
- Phylum: Arthropoda
- Clade: Pancrustacea
- Class: Insecta
- Order: Lepidoptera
- Family: Nepticulidae
- Genus: Ectoedemia
- Species: E. trinotata

Binomial name
- Ectoedemia trinotata (Braun, 1914)

Synonyms
- Nepticula trinotata Braun, 1914

= Ectoedemia trinotata =

Species of moth

Ectoedemia trinotata is a moth of the family Nepticulidae. It is found in eastern North America.

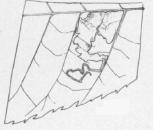
Mine

The wingspan is 4.5–5 mm. There are two generations per year, the mines of the first appearing during the early part of July and those of the second generation at the beginning of September

The larvae feed on Carya cordiformis and Carya ovata. They mine the leaves of their host plant.
