= Ectoedemia tadshikiella =

Scientific classification
- Kingdom: Animalia
- Phylum: Arthropoda
- Class: Insecta
- Order: Lepidoptera
- Family: Nepticulidae
- Genus: Ectoedemia
- Species: E. tadshikiella

Binomial name
- Ectoedemia tadshikiella Puplesis, 1988

Species of moth

Ectoedemia tadshikiella is a moth of the family Nepticulidae. It was described by Rimantas Puplesis in 1988. It is known from Tadzhikistan.
