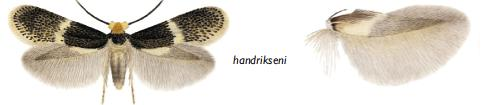
- Male and male hindwing

Scientific classification
- Kingdom: Animalia
- Phylum: Arthropoda
- Clade: Pancrustacea
- Class: Insecta
- Order: Lepidoptera
- Family: Nepticulidae
- Genus: Ectoedemia
- Species: E. hendrikseni

Binomial name
- Ectoedemia hendrikseni A.Lastuvka, Z. Lastuvka & van Nieukerken, 2009

= Ectoedemia hendrikseni =

Species of moth

Ectoedemia hendrikseni is a moth of the family Nepticulidae. It is only known from a small area in the Provence region in southern France (the Estérel Massif in the Alpes-Maritimes and Var).

The wingspan is 6-6.8 mm. Adults are on wing from May to June.

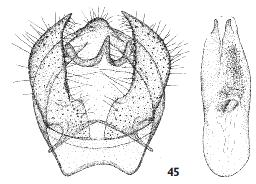
Male genitalia

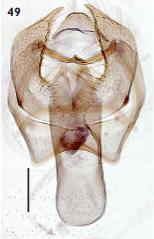
Male genitalia

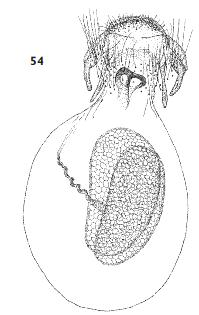
Female genitalia

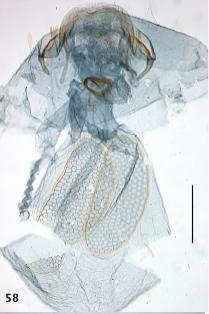
Female genitalia

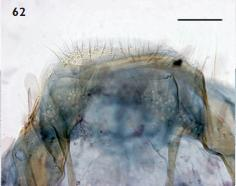
Female terminal abdominal segment

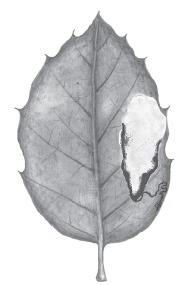
Leafmine
