= Ectoedemia variicapitella =

Scientific classification
- Kingdom: Animalia
- Phylum: Arthropoda
- Class: Insecta
- Order: Lepidoptera
- Family: Nepticulidae
- Genus: Ectoedemia
- Species: E. variicapitella

Binomial name
- Ectoedemia variicapitella (Chretien, 1908)

Synonyms
- Nepticula variicapitella Chretien, 1908

Species of moth

Ectoedemia variicapitella is a moth of the family Nepticulidae. It is endemic to the Canary Islands.

The larvae feed on Hypericum canariense. They mine the leaves of their host plant.
