= Ectoedemia asiatica =

Scientific classification
- Kingdom: Animalia
- Phylum: Arthropoda
- Class: Insecta
- Order: Lepidoptera
- Family: Nepticulidae
- Genus: Ectoedemia
- Species: E. asiatica

Binomial name
- Ectoedemia asiatica (Puplesis, 1988)

Species of moth

Ectoedemia asiatica is a moth of the family Nepticulidae. It was described by R.K. Puplesis in 1988. It is known from Tajikistan.
