= Ectoedemia guerkiae =

Scientific classification
- Kingdom: Animalia
- Phylum: Arthropoda
- Class: Insecta
- Order: Lepidoptera
- Family: Nepticulidae
- Genus: Ectoedemia
- Species: E. guerkiae

Binomial name
- Ectoedemia guerkiae Scoble, 1983

Species of moth

Ectoedemia guerkiae is a moth of the family Nepticulidae. It was described by Scoble in 1983. It is known from South Africa (it was described from Pretoria).

The larvae feed on Diospyros lycioides guerkei.
