= Ectoedemia mesoloba =

Scientific classification
- Kingdom: Animalia
- Phylum: Arthropoda
- Class: Insecta
- Order: Lepidoptera
- Family: Nepticulidae
- Genus: Ectoedemia
- Species: E. mesoloba

Binomial name
- Ectoedemia mesoloba Davis, 1978

Species of moth

Ectoedemia mesoloba is a moth of the family Nepticulidae. It is found in Florida, United States.

The length of the forewings is about 2.7 mm. Adults have been collected in November.
