= Ectoedemia insulata =

Scientific classification
- Kingdom: Animalia
- Phylum: Arthropoda
- Class: Insecta
- Order: Lepidoptera
- Family: Nepticulidae
- Genus: Ectoedemia
- Species: E. insulata

Binomial name
- Ectoedemia insulata (Meyrick, 1911)

Species of moth

Ectoedemia insulata is a moth of the family Nepticulidae. It was described by Edward Meyrick in 1911. It is known from South Africa (it was described from the former Transvaal province).
