= Ectoedemia scabridae =

Scientific classification
- Kingdom: Animalia
- Phylum: Arthropoda
- Clade: Pancrustacea
- Class: Insecta
- Order: Lepidoptera
- Family: Nepticulidae
- Genus: Ectoedemia
- Species: E. scabridae

Binomial name
- Ectoedemia scabridae Scoble, 1983

Species of moth

Ectoedemia scabridae is a moth of the family Nepticulidae. It was described by Scoble in 1983. It is known from South Africa (it was described from Natal).

The larvae feed on Diospyros scabrida.
