= Ectoedemia preisseckeri =

Scientific classification
- Kingdom: Animalia
- Phylum: Arthropoda
- Clade: Pancrustacea
- Class: Insecta
- Order: Lepidoptera
- Family: Nepticulidae
- Genus: Ectoedemia
- Species: E. preisseckeri

Binomial name
- Ectoedemia preisseckeri (Klimesch, 1941)

Synonyms
- Nepticula preisseckeri Klimesch, 1941

Species of moth

Ectoedemia preisseckeri is a moth of the family Nepticulidae. It is found from the Czech Republic and Slovakia to Italy and Greece.

The wingspan is 5–6.6 millimetres (0.20–0.26 in). Adults are on wing in May and June. There is one generation per year.

The larvae feed on Ulmus campestris and Ulmus laevis. They mine the leaves of their host plant.
