= Ectoedemia phyllotomella =

Scientific classification
- Kingdom: Animalia
- Phylum: Arthropoda
- Clade: Pancrustacea
- Class: Insecta
- Order: Lepidoptera
- Family: Nepticulidae
- Genus: Ectoedemia
- Species: E. phyllotomella

Binomial name
- Ectoedemia phyllotomella (Klimesch, 1946)

Synonyms
- Stigmella phyllotomella Klimesch, 1946

Species of moth

Ectoedemia phyllotomella is a moth of the family Nepticulidae. It is only known from Liguria and Lucania in northern Italy.

The wingspan is 4.6-5.2 mm. Adults are on wing from April to May. There is one generation per year.

The larvae feed on Quercus cerris. They mine the leaves of their host plant.
