= Ectoedemia glycystrota =

Scientific classification
- Kingdom: Animalia
- Phylum: Arthropoda
- Class: Insecta
- Order: Lepidoptera
- Family: Nepticulidae
- Genus: Ectoedemia
- Species: E. glycystrota

Binomial name
- Ectoedemia glycystrota (Meyrick, 1928)

Species of moth

Ectoedemia glycystrota is a moth of the family Nepticulidae. It was described by Edward Meyrick in 1928. It is known from Bombay, India.
