= Ectoedemia stimulata =

Scientific classification
- Kingdom: Animalia
- Phylum: Arthropoda
- Class: Insecta
- Order: Lepidoptera
- Family: Nepticulidae
- Genus: Ectoedemia
- Species: E. stimulata

Binomial name
- Ectoedemia stimulata (Meyrick, 1913)

Species of moth

Ectoedemia stimulata is a moth of the family Nepticulidae. It was described by Edward Meyrick in 1913. It is known from South Africa (it was described from what was then Transvaal province).
