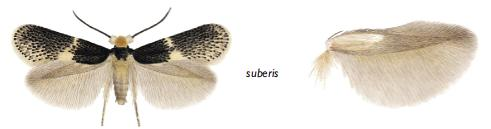
- Male and male hindwing

Scientific classification
- Kingdom: Animalia
- Phylum: Arthropoda
- Clade: Pancrustacea
- Class: Insecta
- Order: Lepidoptera
- Family: Nepticulidae
- Genus: Ectoedemia
- Species: E. suberis

Binomial name
- Ectoedemia suberis (Stainton, 1869)

Synonyms
- Nepticula suberis Stainton, 1869; Nepticula viridella Mendes, 1910

= Ectoedemia suberis =

Species of moth

Ectoedemia suberis is a moth of the family Nepticulidae. It is found on the Iberian Peninsula, as well as in France, Corsica, Sardinia and North Africa. It has not been recorded from mainland Italy.

The wingspan is 6.4-7.2 mm. Adults are on wing from July to early October, but some specimens from Marbella were taken in June. There is one generation per year.

The larvae feed on Quercus coccifera, Quercus ilex, Quercus ilex rotundifolia and Quercus suber. They mine the leaves of their host plant.

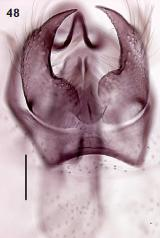
Male genitalia

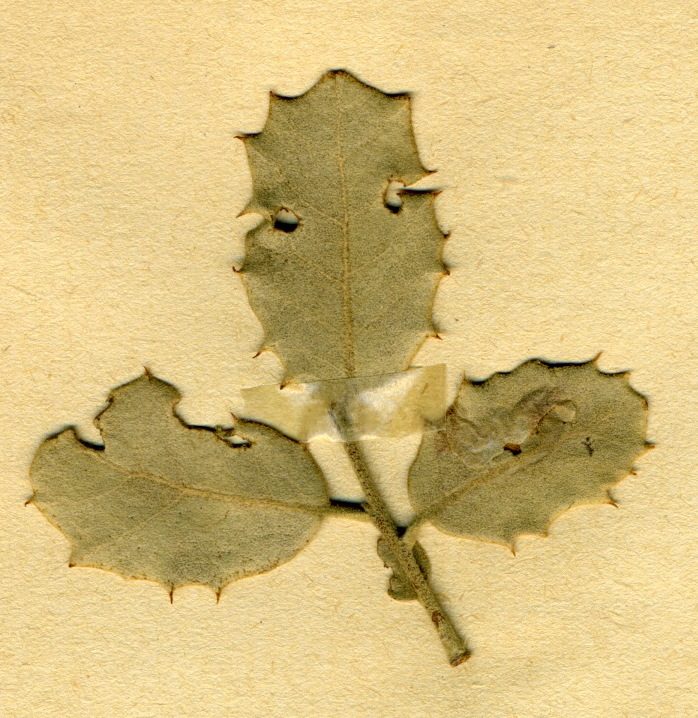
Leaf mines
