= Ectoedemia squamibunda =

Scientific classification
- Kingdom: Animalia
- Phylum: Arthropoda
- Class: Insecta
- Order: Lepidoptera
- Family: Nepticulidae
- Genus: Ectoedemia
- Species: E. squamibunda

Binomial name
- Ectoedemia squamibunda Hoare, 2000

Species of moth

Ectoedemia squamibunda is a moth of the family Nepticulidae. It is found along the north-eastern coast of Queensland, Australia.

The larvae feed on Capparis arborea. They mine the leaves of their host plant.
