= Ectoedemia rosae =

Scientific classification
- Kingdom: Animalia
- Phylum: Arthropoda
- Class: Insecta
- Order: Lepidoptera
- Family: Nepticulidae
- Genus: Ectoedemia
- Species: E. rosae

Binomial name
- Ectoedemia rosae Van Nieukerken, 2011

Species of moth

Ectoedemia rosae is a moth of the family Nepticulidae. It is found in France (Briançon area) and Norway (Vang).

The wingspan is 4.5–4.7 mm for males and 5.0–5.2 mm for females. There is one generation per year.

The larvae feed on Rosa tomentosa and probably Rosa majalis. They mine the leaves of their host plant.

== Etymology ==
The species is named after the host plant genus.
