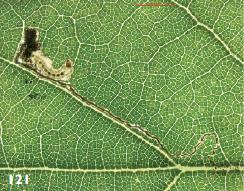
- 3rd instar larva on Quercus pubescens

Scientific classification
- Kingdom: Animalia
- Phylum: Arthropoda
- Class: Insecta
- Order: Lepidoptera
- Family: Nepticulidae
- Genus: Ectoedemia
- Species: E. pubescivora

Binomial name
- Ectoedemia pubescivora (Weber, 1937)

Synonyms
- Nepticula pubescivora Weber, 1937

= Ectoedemia pubescivora =

Species of moth

Ectoedemia pubescivora is a moth of the family Nepticulidae. It is found in southern France, the Iberian Peninsula, Switzerland, northern Italy, Sardinia and Sicily.

The wingspan is 5–6 mm. Adults are on wing from May to the first half of June. There is one generation per year.

The larvae feed on Quercus pubescens. They mine the leaves of their host plant.
