= Ectoedemia grandinosa =

Scientific classification
- Kingdom: Animalia
- Phylum: Arthropoda
- Class: Insecta
- Order: Lepidoptera
- Family: Nepticulidae
- Genus: Ectoedemia
- Species: E. grandinosa

Binomial name
- Ectoedemia grandinosa (Meyrick, 1911)

Species of moth

Ectoedemia grandinosa is a moth of the family Nepticulidae. It was described by Edward Meyrick in 1911. It is known from South Africa (it was described from Pretoria).

The larvae feed on Diospyros lycioides lycioides.
