= Ectoedemia molybditis =

Scientific classification
- Kingdom: Animalia
- Phylum: Arthropoda
- Clade: Pancrustacea
- Class: Insecta
- Order: Lepidoptera
- Family: Nepticulidae
- Genus: Ectoedemia
- Species: E. molybditis

Binomial name
- Ectoedemia molybditis (Zeller, 1877)

Species of moth

Ectoedemia molybditis is a moth of the family Nepticulidae. It was described by Zeller in 1877. It is known from Colombia.
