= Ectoedemia maculata =

Scientific classification
- Kingdom: Animalia
- Phylum: Arthropoda
- Class: Insecta
- Order: Lepidoptera
- Family: Nepticulidae
- Genus: Ectoedemia
- Species: E. maculata

Binomial name
- Ectoedemia maculata Puplesis, 1987

Species of moth

Ectoedemia maculata is a moth of the family Nepticulidae. It was described by Puplesis in 1987. It is known from the Russian Far East.

== See also ==
- List of moths of Russia
