= Ectoedemia repanda =

Scientific classification
- Kingdom: Animalia
- Phylum: Arthropoda
- Class: Insecta
- Order: Lepidoptera
- Family: Nepticulidae
- Genus: Ectoedemia
- Species: E. repanda

Binomial name
- Ectoedemia repanda Puplesis & Diškus, 2002

Synonyms
- Fomoria repanda Puplesis & Diškus, 2002

Species of moth

Ectoedemia repanda is a moth of the family Nepticulidae. It is found in the lowland Amazon rainforest in Ecuador.

The wingspan is 3.7-4.4 mm for males. Adults have been collected in January.
