= Ectoedemia luisae =

Scientific classification
- Kingdom: Animalia
- Phylum: Arthropoda
- Clade: Pancrustacea
- Class: Insecta
- Order: Lepidoptera
- Family: Nepticulidae
- Genus: Ectoedemia
- Species: E. luisae

Binomial name
- Ectoedemia luisae (Klimesch, 1978)

Synonyms
- Fomoria luisae Klimesch, 1978; Trifurcula luisae (Klimesch, 1978)

Species of moth

Ectoedemia luisae is a moth of the family Nepticulidae. It is found in Turkey.

The larvae feed on Hypericum calycinum. They mine the leaves of their host plant.
