= Ectoedemia vincamajorella =

Scientific classification
- Kingdom: Animalia
- Phylum: Arthropoda
- Clade: Pancrustacea
- Class: Insecta
- Order: Lepidoptera
- Family: Nepticulidae
- Genus: Ectoedemia
- Species: E. vincamajorella

Binomial name
- Ectoedemia vincamajorella (Hartig, 1964)

Synonyms
- Nepticula vincamajorella Hartig, 1964

Species of moth

Ectoedemia vincamajorella is a moth of the family Nepticulidae. It is endemic to central Italy.

The larvae feed on Vinca major.
