= Ectoedemia nigrifasciata =

Scientific classification
- Kingdom: Animalia
- Phylum: Arthropoda
- Class: Insecta
- Order: Lepidoptera
- Family: Nepticulidae
- Genus: Ectoedemia
- Species: E. nigrifasciata

Binomial name
- Ectoedemia nigrifasciata (Walsingham, 1908)

Synonyms
- Dechtiria nigrifasciata (Walsingham, 1908) Klimesch, 1972; Fomoria nigrifasciata (Walsingham, 1908) Diškus et al., 2003; Muhabbetana nigrifasciata (Walsingham, 1908) van Nieukerken et al., 2016; Nepticula nigrifasciata (Walsingham, 1908) Rebel, 1910; Stigmella nigrifasciata Walsingham, 1908; Trifurcula nigrifasciata (Walsingham, 1908) Klimesch, 1977

Species of moth

Ectoedemia nigrifasciata is a moth of the family Nepticulidae. It is endemic to the Canary Islands.

The larvae feed on Periploca laevigata. They mine the leaves of their host plant.
