= Ectoedemia nuristanica =

Scientific classification
- Kingdom: Animalia
- Phylum: Arthropoda
- Clade: Pancrustacea
- Class: Insecta
- Order: Lepidoptera
- Family: Nepticulidae
- Genus: Ectoedemia
- Species: E. nuristanica

Binomial name
- Ectoedemia nuristanica van Nieukerken, 1985

Species of moth

Ectoedemia nuristanica is a moth of the family Nepticulidae. It is only known from Nuristan in eastern Afghanistan.

The wingspan is 6.4–7 mm. Adults have been caught in July.
