= Ectoedemia christopheri =

Scientific classification
- Kingdom: Animalia
- Phylum: Arthropoda
- Class: Insecta
- Order: Lepidoptera
- Family: Nepticulidae
- Genus: Ectoedemia
- Species: E. christopheri

Binomial name
- Ectoedemia christopheri Puplesis, 1985

Synonyms
- Ectoedemia wilkinsoni Puplesis, 1984 122 (preocc. Scoble, 1983)

Species of moth

Ectoedemia christopheri is a moth of the family Nepticulidae. It was described by Puplesis in 1985. It is known from the Russian Far East.
