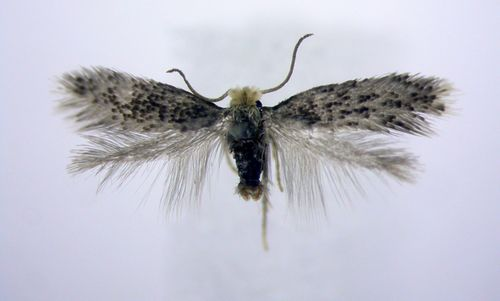

Scientific classification
- Kingdom: Animalia
- Phylum: Arthropoda
- Clade: Pancrustacea
- Class: Insecta
- Order: Lepidoptera
- Family: Nepticulidae
- Genus: Ectoedemia
- Species: E. canutus

Binomial name
- Ectoedemia canutus Wilkinson & Scoble, 1979

= Ectoedemia canutus =

Species of moth

The balsam poplar petiole miner (Ectoedemia canutus) is a moth of the family Nepticulidae. It is found in North America.

The larvae have been recorded on Populus sect. Tacamahaca, wherein they form galls on the petioles of its leaves.
