= Ectoedemia craspedota =

Scientific classification
- Kingdom: Animalia
- Phylum: Arthropoda
- Class: Insecta
- Order: Lepidoptera
- Family: Nepticulidae
- Genus: Ectoedemia
- Species: E. craspedota

Binomial name
- Ectoedemia craspedota (Vári, 1963)

Species of moth

Ectoedemia craspedota is a moth of the family Nepticulidae. It was described by Vári in 1963. It is known from South Africa (it was described from the Cape Province).

The larvae feed on Maytenus undata.
