= Ectoedemia ruwenzoriensis =

Scientific classification
- Kingdom: Animalia
- Phylum: Arthropoda
- Class: Insecta
- Order: Lepidoptera
- Family: Nepticulidae
- Genus: Ectoedemia
- Subgenus: Ectoedemia (Fomoria)
- Species: E. ruwenzoriensis

Binomial name
- Ectoedemia ruwenzoriensis (Bradley, 1965)

Synonyms
- Stigmella ruwenzoriensis Bradley, 1965; Acalyptris ruwenzoriensis (Bradley, 1965)

Species of moth

Ectoedemia ruwenzoriensis is a moth of the family Nepticulidae. It is only known from the Rwenzori Mountains in Uganda.
