= Ectoedemia ortiva =

Scientific classification
- Kingdom: Animalia
- Phylum: Arthropoda
- Clade: Pancrustacea
- Class: Insecta
- Order: Lepidoptera
- Family: Nepticulidae
- Genus: Ectoedemia
- Species: E. ortiva

Binomial name
- Ectoedemia ortiva Rocienė & Stonis, 2013

Species of moth

Ectoedemia ortiva is a moth of the family Nepticulidae. It is found in the Russian Far East (Primorskiy Kray). The habitat consists of dense, mostly deciduous forests.

The wingspan is about 5.6 mm.
