= Ectoedemia virgulae =

Scientific classification
- Kingdom: Animalia
- Phylum: Arthropoda
- Class: Insecta
- Order: Lepidoptera
- Family: Nepticulidae
- Genus: Ectoedemia
- Species: E. virgulae

Binomial name
- Ectoedemia virgulae (Braun, 1927)

Species of moth

Ectoedemia virgulae is a moth of the family Nepticulidae. It was described by Annette Frances Braun in 1927. It is known from the United States including Ohio, Maryland and Florida, and in Canada from Ontario and Quebec.

The larvae feed on Corylus americana.
