= Ectoedemia quadrinotata =

Scientific classification
- Kingdom: Animalia
- Phylum: Arthropoda
- Class: Insecta
- Order: Lepidoptera
- Family: Nepticulidae
- Genus: Ectoedemia
- Species: E. quadrinotata

Binomial name
- Ectoedemia quadrinotata (Braun, 1917)

Synonyms
- Nepticula quadrinotata Braun, 1917

Species of moth

Ectoedemia quadrinotata is a moth of the family Nepticulidae. The known range of this species includes Ohio and Kentucky in the United States, and Manitoba, Ontario, and Quebec in Canada. This species was first described by American entomologist Annette Frances Braun in 1917.

Mine

The larvae mine the leaves of Carpinus caroliniana and Corylus americana. There are two generations per year (bivoltine), with mines initiated in July and again starting in late August.

The wingspan is 4–5 mm.
