= Ectoedemia gambiana =

Scientific classification
- Kingdom: Animalia
- Phylum: Arthropoda
- Class: Insecta
- Order: Lepidoptera
- Family: Nepticulidae
- Genus: Ectoedemia
- Species: E. gambiana

Binomial name
- Ectoedemia gambiana (Gustafsson, 1972)

Species of moth

Ectoedemia gambiana is a moth of the family Nepticulidae. It was described by Gustafsson in 1972. It is known from Gambia.
