= Ectoedemia similigena =

Scientific classification
- Kingdom: Animalia
- Phylum: Arthropoda
- Clade: Pancrustacea
- Class: Insecta
- Order: Lepidoptera
- Family: Nepticulidae
- Genus: Ectoedemia
- Species: E. similigena

Binomial name
- Ectoedemia similigena Puplesis, 1994

Species of moth

Ectoedemia similigena is a moth of the family Nepticulidae. It is only known from its type locality, Jalta botanical garden, on the Crimea (Ukraine). The species has not been found again, and it is possible that it is actually a species from somewhere in Central or Eastern Asia, introduced with plants.

Adults are on in May.

The hostplant is unknown, but it is probably a Populus species.

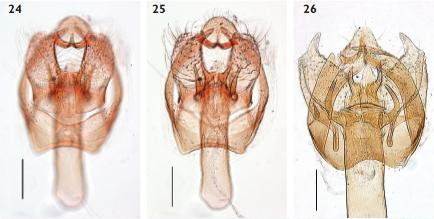
Male genitalia

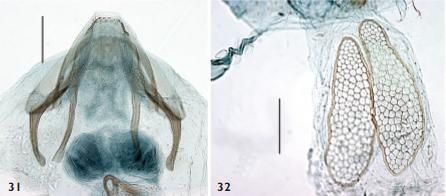
Female genitalia
