= Ectoedemia marmaropa =

Scientific classification
- Kingdom: Animalia
- Phylum: Arthropoda
- Class: Insecta
- Order: Lepidoptera
- Family: Nepticulidae
- Genus: Ectoedemia
- Species: E. marmaropa

Binomial name
- Ectoedemia marmaropa (Braun, 1925)

Synonyms
- Nepticula marmaropa Braun, 1925

Species of moth

Ectoedemia marmaropa is a moth of the family Nepticulidae. It was described by Annette Frances Braun in 1925. It is known from North America, including Utah, Wyoming, Ohio, Alberta, British Columbia, Newfoundland, and California.

The wingspan is 4.2-4.4 mm. The forewings are dark brown. The larvae feed on Rosa woodsii and Rosa californica. They mine the leaves of their host plant.
