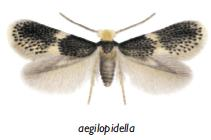
- Male

Scientific classification
- Kingdom: Animalia
- Phylum: Arthropoda
- Clade: Pancrustacea
- Class: Insecta
- Order: Lepidoptera
- Family: Nepticulidae
- Genus: Ectoedemia
- Species: E. aegilopidella

Binomial name
- Ectoedemia aegilopidella (Klimesch, 1978)

Synonyms
- Trifurcula aegilopidella Klimesch, 1978

= Ectoedemia aegilopidella =

Species of moth

Ectoedemia aegilopidella is a moth of the family Nepticulidae. It is endemic to mainland Greece and Rhodes.

The wingspan is 3.8-4.2 mm. Adults are on wing in April. There is probably one generation per year.

The larvae feed on Quercus macrolepis. They mine the leaves of their host plant.
