= Ectoedemia myrtinaecola =

Scientific classification
- Kingdom: Animalia
- Phylum: Arthropoda
- Clade: Pancrustacea
- Class: Insecta
- Order: Lepidoptera
- Family: Nepticulidae
- Genus: Ectoedemia
- Species: E. myrtinaecola

Binomial name
- Ectoedemia myrtinaecola Scoble, 1983

Species of moth

Ectoedemia myrtinaecola is a moth of the family Nepticulidae. It was described by Scoble in 1983. It is known from South Africa (it was described from the Cape Province).

The larvae feed on Scutia myrtinae.
