= Ectoedemia mauni =

Scientific classification
- Kingdom: Animalia
- Phylum: Arthropoda
- Clade: Pancrustacea
- Class: Insecta
- Order: Lepidoptera
- Family: Nepticulidae
- Genus: Ectoedemia
- Species: E. mauni

Binomial name
- Ectoedemia mauni Scoble, 1979

Species of moth

Ectoedemia mauni is a moth of the family Nepticulidae. It was described by Scoble in 1979. It is known from Botswana.

The larvae feed on Commiphora africana.
