= Ectoedemia piperella =

Scientific classification
- Kingdom: Animalia
- Phylum: Arthropoda
- Clade: Pancrustacea
- Class: Insecta
- Order: Lepidoptera
- Family: Nepticulidae
- Genus: Ectoedemia
- Species: E. piperella

Binomial name
- Ectoedemia piperella Wilkinson & Newton, 1981

Species of moth

Ectoedemia piperella is a moth of the family Nepticulidae. It was described by Wilkinson and Newton in 1981. It is known from Arkansas.

The wingspan is 6.4–8.2 mm
