= Ectoedemia eriki =

Scientific classification
- Kingdom: Animalia
- Phylum: Arthropoda
- Class: Insecta
- Order: Lepidoptera
- Family: Nepticulidae
- Genus: Ectoedemia
- Species: E. eriki

Binomial name
- Ectoedemia eriki A. & Z. Lastuvka, 2000

Species of moth

Ectoedemia eriki is a moth of the family Nepticulidae. It is found in Macedonia and mainland Greece.
