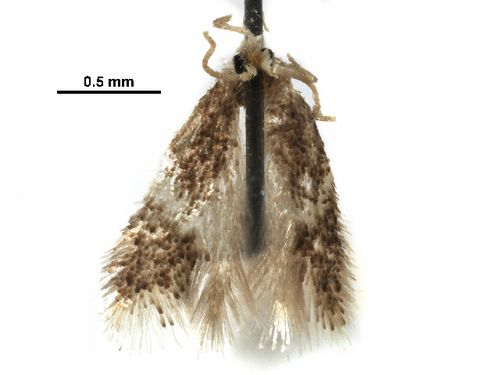

Scientific classification
- Kingdom: Animalia
- Phylum: Arthropoda
- Clade: Pancrustacea
- Class: Insecta
- Order: Lepidoptera
- Family: Nepticulidae
- Genus: Ectoedemia
- Species: E. andrella

Binomial name
- Ectoedemia andrella Wilkinson, 1981

= Ectoedemia andrella =

Species of moth

Ectoedemia andrella is a moth of the family Nepticulidae. It was described by Wilkinson in 1981. It is known from Maine.

The wingspan is about 6 mm.
