= Ectoedemia uisebi =

Scientific classification
- Kingdom: Animalia
- Phylum: Arthropoda
- Clade: Pancrustacea
- Class: Insecta
- Order: Lepidoptera
- Family: Nepticulidae
- Genus: Ectoedemia
- Species: E. uisebi

Binomial name
- Ectoedemia uisebi Mey, 2004

Species of moth

Ectoedemia uisebi is a moth of the family Nepticulidae. It was described by Wolfram Mey in 2004. It is known from Namibia.
