= Ectoedemia macrochaeta =

Scientific classification
- Kingdom: Animalia
- Phylum: Arthropoda
- Class: Insecta
- Order: Lepidoptera
- Family: Nepticulidae
- Genus: Ectoedemia
- Species: E. macrochaeta

Binomial name
- Ectoedemia macrochaeta (Meyrick, 1921)

Species of moth

Ectoedemia macrochaeta is a moth of the family Nepticulidae. It was described by Edward Meyrick in 1921. It is known from South Africa (it was described from Pretoria).

The larvae feed on Diospyros lycioides guerkei.
