= Ectoedemia psarodes =

Scientific classification
- Kingdom: Animalia
- Phylum: Arthropoda
- Class: Insecta
- Order: Lepidoptera
- Family: Nepticulidae
- Genus: Ectoedemia
- Species: E. psarodes

Binomial name
- Ectoedemia psarodes (Vári, 1963)

Species of moth

Ectoedemia psarodes is a moth of the family Nepticulidae. It was described by Vári in 1963. It is known from South Africa (it was described from the Soutpansberg District in Transvaal).

The larvae feed on Maytenus undatus.
