= Ectoedemia leptognathos =

Scientific classification
- Kingdom: Animalia
- Phylum: Arthropoda
- Class: Insecta
- Order: Lepidoptera
- Family: Nepticulidae
- Genus: Ectoedemia
- Species: E. leptognathos

Binomial name
- Ectoedemia leptognathos (Puplesis & Diskus, 1996)

Synonyms
- Etainia leptognathos Puplesis & Diskus, 1996

Species of moth

Ectoedemia leptognathos is a moth of the family Nepticulidae. It was described by Rimantas Puplesis and Arunas Diškus in 1996. It is known from Turkmenistan.
