= Ectoedemia kowynensis =

Scientific classification
- Kingdom: Animalia
- Phylum: Arthropoda
- Clade: Pancrustacea
- Class: Insecta
- Order: Lepidoptera
- Family: Nepticulidae
- Genus: Ectoedemia
- Species: E. kowynensis

Binomial name
- Ectoedemia kowynensis Scoble, 1983

Species of moth

Ectoedemia kowynensis is a moth of the family Nepticulidae. It was described by Scoble in 1983. It is known from South Africa (it was described from Kowyn's Pass in Transvaal).

The larvae feed on Maytenus peduncularis.
