= Ectoedemia platanella =

Scientific classification
- Kingdom: Animalia
- Phylum: Arthropoda
- Clade: Pancrustacea
- Class: Insecta
- Order: Lepidoptera
- Family: Nepticulidae
- Genus: Ectoedemia
- Species: E. platanella

Binomial name
- Ectoedemia platanella (Clemens, 1861)

Synonyms
- Nepticula platanella Clemens, 1861

Species of moth

Ectoedemia platanella, the sycamore leaf blotch miner, is a moth of the family Nepticulidae. It is found in the eastern parts of the United States.

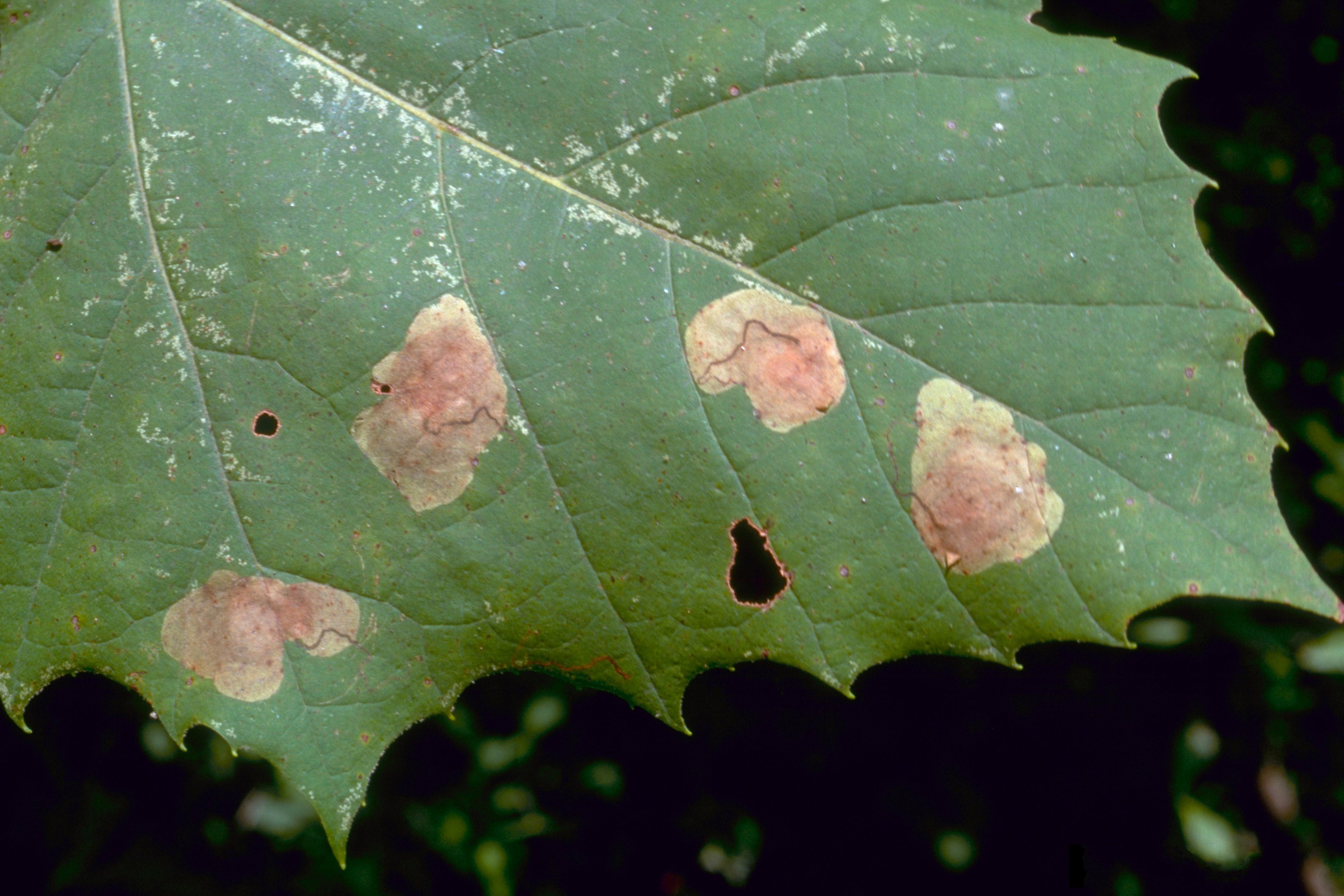
Ectoedemia platanella mine

The wingspan is 5.5–7 mm.

The larvae feed on Platanus species. They mine the leaves of their host plant.
