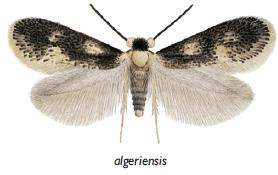

Scientific classification
- Kingdom: Animalia
- Phylum: Arthropoda
- Clade: Pancrustacea
- Class: Insecta
- Order: Lepidoptera
- Family: Nepticulidae
- Genus: Ectoedemia
- Species: E. algeriensis

Binomial name
- Ectoedemia algeriensis van Nieukerken, 1985

= Ectoedemia algeriensis =

Species of moth

Ectoedemia algeriensis is a moth of the family Nepticulidae. It is found in Algeria, the Atlas mountains in Morocco and in southern France.

The wingspan is 5-5.6 mm. Adults are on wing in June. There is probably one generation per year.

The larvae feed on Quercus coccifera, Quercus ilex, Quercus ilex rotundifolia and Quercus suber. They mine the leaves of their host plant.

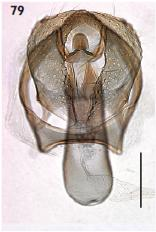
Male genitalia

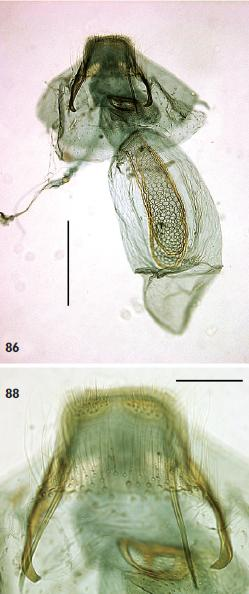
Female genitalia
