= Ectoedemia zimbabwiensis =

Scientific classification
- Kingdom: Animalia
- Phylum: Arthropoda
- Clade: Pancrustacea
- Class: Insecta
- Order: Lepidoptera
- Family: Nepticulidae
- Genus: Ectoedemia
- Species: E. zimbabwiensis

Binomial name
- Ectoedemia zimbabwiensis (Scoble, 1983)

Species of moth

Ectoedemia zimbabwiensis is a moth of the family Nepticulidae. It was described by Scoble in 1983. It is known from Zimbabwe.
