= Ectoedemia fuscata =

Scientific classification
- Kingdom: Animalia
- Phylum: Arthropoda
- Class: Insecta
- Order: Lepidoptera
- Family: Nepticulidae
- Genus: Ectoedemia
- Species: E. fuscata

Binomial name
- Ectoedemia fuscata (Janse, 1948)

Species of moth

Ectoedemia fuscata is a moth of the family Nepticulidae. It was described by Anthonie Johannes Theodorus Janse in 1948. It is known from Namibia.
