= Ectoedemia reichli =

Scientific classification
- Kingdom: Animalia
- Phylum: Arthropoda
- Clade: Pancrustacea
- Class: Insecta
- Order: Lepidoptera
- Family: Nepticulidae
- Genus: Ectoedemia
- Species: E. reichli

Binomial name
- Ectoedemia reichli Z. & A. Lastuvka, 1998

Species of moth

Ectoedemia reichli is a moth of the family Nepticulidae. It is found in Greece, the Czech Republic, northern Italy, Slovakia, Croatia and Switzerland.

The wingspan is 6.8–9.1 mm (0.27–0.36 in). Adults are on wing from late May to mid-June in Greece and from late June to early August elsewhere.

The host plant is unknown.

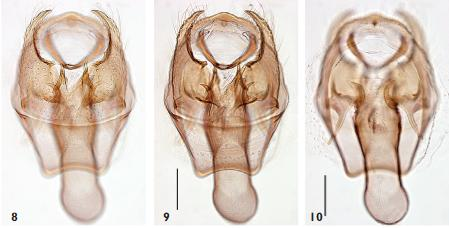
Male genitalia

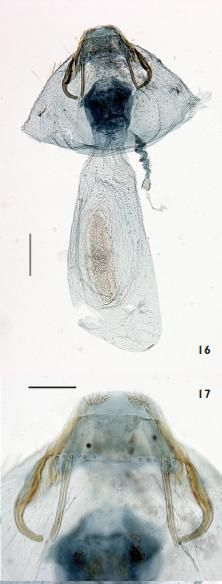
Female genitalia
