= Ectoedemia vannifera =

Scientific classification
- Kingdom: Animalia
- Phylum: Arthropoda
- Class: Insecta
- Order: Lepidoptera
- Family: Nepticulidae
- Genus: Ectoedemia
- Species: E. vannifera

Binomial name
- Ectoedemia vannifera (Meyrick, 1914)

Species of moth

Ectoedemia vannifera is a moth of the family Nepticulidae. It was described by Edward Meyrick in 1914. It is known from South Africa (it was described from Pretoria).

The larvae feed on Boscia oleoides.
