= Ectoedemia pilosae =

Scientific classification
- Kingdom: Animalia
- Phylum: Arthropoda
- Class: Insecta
- Order: Lepidoptera
- Family: Nepticulidae
- Genus: Ectoedemia
- Species: E. pilosae

Binomial name
- Ectoedemia pilosae Puplesis, 1984

Species of moth

Ectoedemia pilosae is a moth of the family Nepticulidae. It was described by Puplesis in 1984. It is known from the Russian Far East.

The larvae feed on Agrimonia pilosa.
