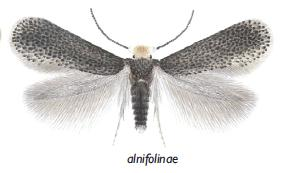

Scientific classification
- Kingdom: Animalia
- Phylum: Arthropoda
- Clade: Pancrustacea
- Class: Insecta
- Order: Lepidoptera
- Family: Nepticulidae
- Genus: Ectoedemia
- Species: E. alnifoliae

Binomial name
- Ectoedemia alnifoliae van Nieukerken, 1985

= Ectoedemia alnifoliae =

Species of moth

Ectoedemia alnifoliae is a moth of the family Nepticulidae. It is found in the Troödos mountains on Cyprus, Greece (Samos) and southern Turkey.

The wingspan is about 6.6 mm. Adults are on wing in April. There is one generation per year.

The larvae feed on Quercus alnifolia and Quercus coccifera. They mine the leaves of their host plant. The mine consists of a narrow, much contorted, corridor that widens into a large blotch against the leaf margin.

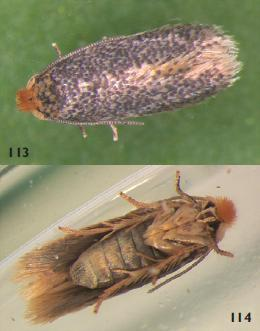

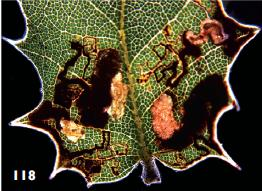
Mine and larvae on Quercus coccifera

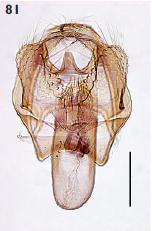
Male genitalia

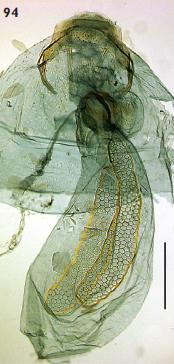
Female genitalia

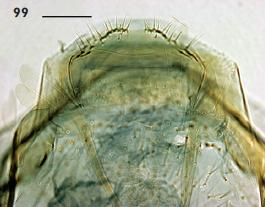
Female terminal abdominal segment
