= Ectoedemia royenicola =

Scientific classification
- Kingdom: Animalia
- Phylum: Arthropoda
- Class: Insecta
- Order: Lepidoptera
- Family: Nepticulidae
- Genus: Ectoedemia
- Species: E. royenicola

Binomial name
- Ectoedemia royenicola (Vári, 1955)

Species of moth

Ectoedemia royenicola is a moth of the family Nepticulidae. It was described by Vári in 1955. It is known from South Africa (it was described from Pretoria).

The larvae feed on Diospyros whyteana.
