= Ectoedemia flavimacula =

Scientific classification
- Kingdom: Animalia
- Phylum: Arthropoda
- Class: Insecta
- Order: Lepidoptera
- Family: Nepticulidae
- Genus: Ectoedemia
- Species: E. flavimacula

Binomial name
- Ectoedemia flavimacula Puplesis & Diškus, 1996

Synonyms
- Fomoria flavimacula Puplesis & Diškus, 1996

Species of moth

Ectoedemia flavimacula is a moth of the family Nepticulidae. It is only known from the mountainous area near the Varzob River and the southern Vakhsh River valley in Tadzhikistan, near the border with Afghanistan.

The length of the forewings is 1.6-1.8 mm. Adults are on wing from June to August.

The larvae feed on Populus species, probably including Populus pruinosa. They mine the leaves of their host plant.
