= Ectoedemia sinevi =

Scientific classification
- Kingdom: Animalia
- Phylum: Arthropoda
- Class: Insecta
- Order: Lepidoptera
- Family: Nepticulidae
- Genus: Ectoedemia
- Species: E. sinevi

Binomial name
- Ectoedemia sinevi Puplesis, 1985

Species of moth

Ectoedemia sinevi is a moth in the family Nepticulidae. It was described by Puplesis in 1985. It is found in the Russian Far East.
