= Ectoedemia terebinthivora =

Scientific classification
- Kingdom: Animalia
- Phylum: Arthropoda
- Clade: Pancrustacea
- Class: Insecta
- Order: Lepidoptera
- Family: Nepticulidae
- Genus: Ectoedemia
- Species: E. terebinthivora

Binomial name
- Ectoedemia terebinthivora (Klimesch, 1975)

Synonyms
- Trifurcula terebinthivora Klimesch, 1975

Species of moth

Ectoedemia terebinthivora is a moth of the family Nepticulidae. It is only known from Greece (Ionian and Aegean islands) and Turkey (Anatolia).

The wingspan is 4.1-5.2 mm. Adults are on wing from June to July and from May to June. There are probably two generations per year.

The larvae feed on Pistacia terebinthus. They mine the leaves of their host plant.
