= Ectoedemia acanthella =

Scientific classification
- Kingdom: Animalia
- Phylum: Arthropoda
- Clade: Pancrustacea
- Class: Insecta
- Order: Lepidoptera
- Family: Nepticulidae
- Genus: Ectoedemia
- Species: E. acanthella

Binomial name
- Ectoedemia acanthella Wilkinson & Newton, 1981

Species of moth

Ectoedemia acanthella is a moth of the family Nepticulidae. It was described by Wilkinson and Newton in 1981. It is known from New Jersey.

The wingspan is 7.2 mm.
