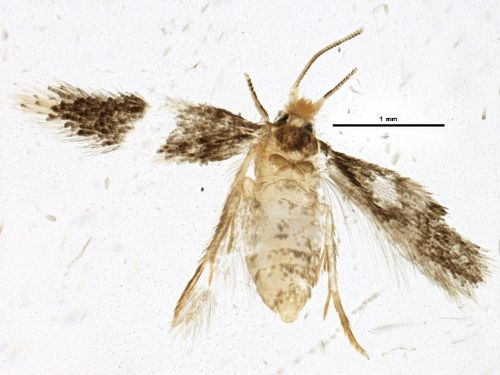

Scientific classification
- Kingdom: Animalia
- Phylum: Arthropoda
- Clade: Pancrustacea
- Class: Insecta
- Order: Lepidoptera
- Family: Nepticulidae
- Genus: Ectoedemia
- Species: E. clemensella

Binomial name
- Ectoedemia clemensella (Chambers, 1873)

Synonyms
- Nepticula clemensella Chambers, 1873

= Ectoedemia clemensella =

Species of moth

Ectoedemia clemensella is a moth of the family Nepticulidae. It is found in Pennsylvania, Kentucky, Maryland, North Carolina, and Ohio.

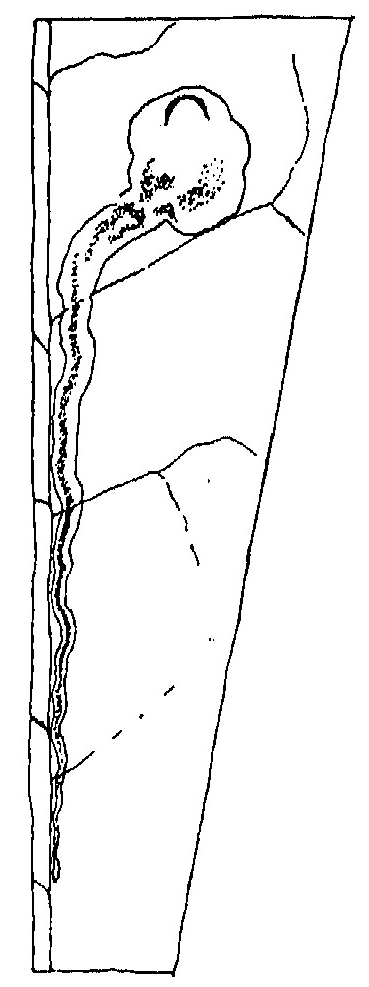
Mine

The wingspan is 4.5-5.2 mm. There are three generations per year.

The larvae feed on Platanus occidentalis. They mine the leaves of their host plant.
