= Ectoedemia chlorantis =

Scientific classification
- Kingdom: Animalia
- Phylum: Arthropoda
- Class: Insecta
- Order: Lepidoptera
- Family: Nepticulidae
- Genus: Ectoedemia
- Species: E. chlorantis

Binomial name
- Ectoedemia chlorantis Meyrick, 1928

Species of moth

Ectoedemia chlorantis is a moth of the family Nepticulidae. It was described by Edward Meyrick in 1928. It is known from Ontario.

The wingspan is about 9 mm.
