= Fomoria pteliaeella =

Scientific classification
- Kingdom: Animalia
- Phylum: Arthropoda
- Clade: Pancrustacea
- Class: Insecta
- Order: Lepidoptera
- Family: Nepticulidae
- Genus: Ectoedemia
- Species: E. pteliaeella

Binomial name
- Ectoedemia pteliaeella (Chambers, 1880)

Synonyms
- Nepticula pteliaeella Chambers, 1880; Ectoedemia pteliaeella (Chambers, 1880)

Species of moth

Fomoria pteliaeella is a species of moth in the family Nepticulidae. It is found in Kentucky and Ohio in the United States.

The wingspan is 4-4.5 mm. There are two generations per year. Larvae may be collected in July and in August and September.

The larvae feed on Ptelea trifoliata. They mine the leaves of their host plant. The egg is deposited on the upper side of the leaf. The mine is much contorted and indistinct, and sometimes blotch-like at first. Later, it becomes more distinct, but is more or less obscured by the scattered frass. Deserted mines become whitish or yellowish. The larva is very bright green in color. The cocoon is dark brown.
