= Ectoedemia pappeivora =

Scientific classification
- Kingdom: Animalia
- Phylum: Arthropoda
- Class: Insecta
- Order: Lepidoptera
- Family: Nepticulidae
- Genus: Ectoedemia
- Species: E. pappeivora

Binomial name
- Ectoedemia pappeivora (Vári, 1963)

Species of moth

Ectoedemia pappeivora is a moth of the family Nepticulidae. It was described by Vári in 1963. It is known from South Africa (it was described from Transvaal).

The larvae feed on Pappea capensis.
