= Ectoedemia albida =

Scientific classification
- Kingdom: Animalia
- Phylum: Arthropoda
- Clade: Pancrustacea
- Class: Insecta
- Order: Lepidoptera
- Family: Nepticulidae
- Genus: Ectoedemia
- Species: E. albida

Binomial name
- Ectoedemia albida Puplesis, 1994

Species of moth

Ectoedemia albida is a moth of the family Nepticulidae. It is only known from southern Turkmenistan and northern Iran.

The wingspan is about 7.4 mm. Adults are on the wing in April and May.

The hostplant is unknown, but it is probably a Populus species.

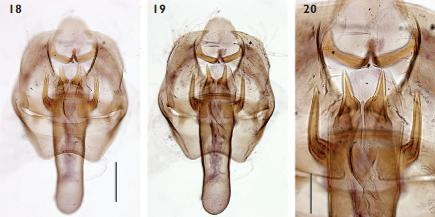
Male genitalia

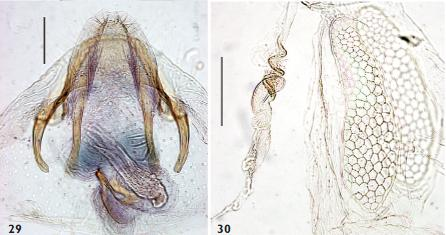
Female genitalia
