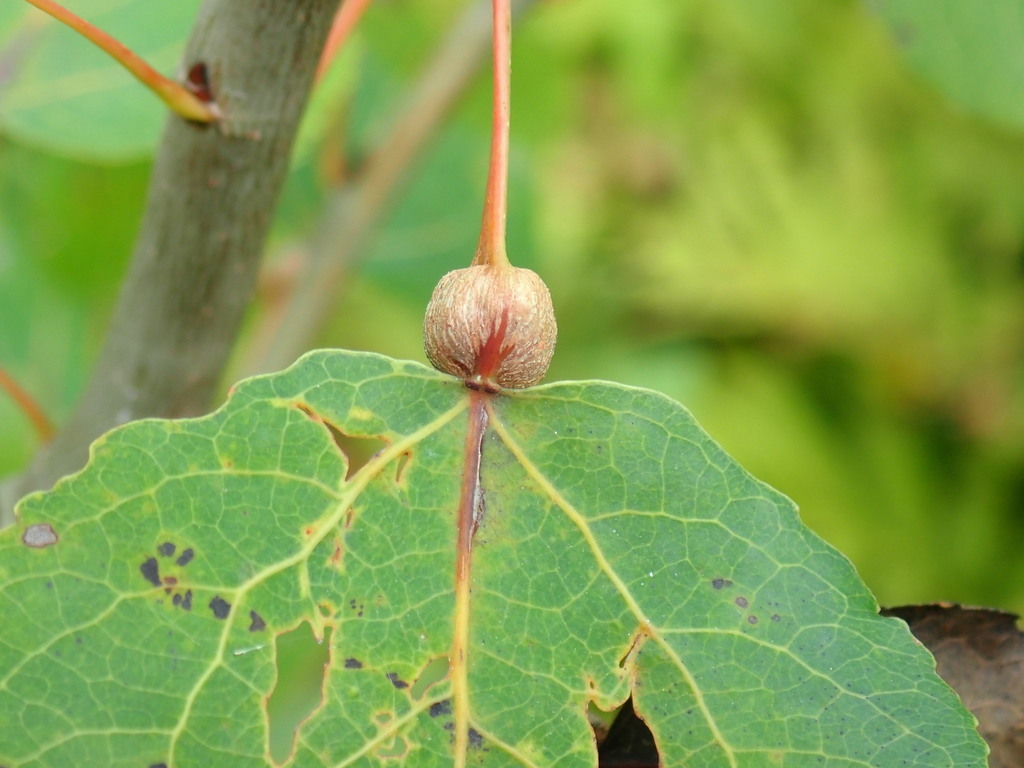

Scientific classification
- Kingdom: Animalia
- Phylum: Arthropoda
- Clade: Pancrustacea
- Class: Insecta
- Order: Lepidoptera
- Family: Nepticulidae
- Genus: Ectoedemia
- Species: E. populella

Binomial name
- Ectoedemia populella Busck, 1907

= Ectoedemia populella =

Species of moth

The poplar petiole gall moth (Ectoedemia populella) is a moth of the family Nepticulidae. It is widely distributed in North America east of the Rocky Mountains. It was first described by Danish-American entomologist August Busck in 1907.

The adult wingspan 7-8.5 mm.

The larvae induce globular galls on the petioles of several Populus species. Mature larvae overwinter in the galls and adults emerge in spring.
