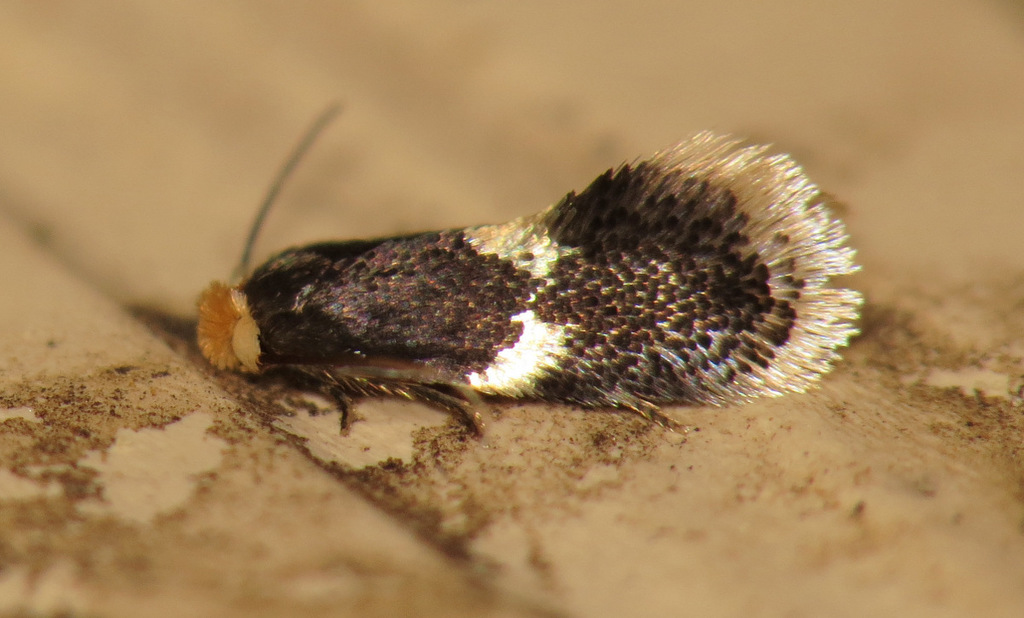

Scientific classification
- Kingdom: Animalia
- Phylum: Arthropoda
- Clade: Pancrustacea
- Class: Insecta
- Order: Lepidoptera
- Family: Nepticulidae
- Genus: Ectoedemia
- Species: E. similella

Binomial name
- Ectoedemia similella (Braun, 1917)

Synonyms
- Nepticula similella Braun, 1917

= Ectoedemia similella =

Species of moth

Ectoedemia similella is a moth of the family Nepticulidae. It is found primarily in eastern North America.

Mine

The wingspan is 5–6 mm.

The larvae feed on Quercus palustris. They mine the leaves of their host plant.
