= Ectoedemia ilicis =

Scientific classification
- Kingdom: Animalia
- Phylum: Arthropoda
- Class: Insecta
- Order: Lepidoptera
- Family: Nepticulidae
- Genus: Ectoedemia
- Species: E. ilicis

Binomial name
- Ectoedemia ilicis (Mendes, 1910)

Synonyms
- Nepticula ilicis Mendes, 1910

Species of moth

Ectoedemia ilicis is a moth of the family Nepticulidae. It is found in the western Mediterranean Region, in southern France and the Iberian Peninsula.

The wingspan is 5.1-7.2 mm. Adults are on wing from March to the end of June. There is one generation per year.

The larvae feed on Quercus coccifera, Quercus ilex, Quercus ilex rotundifolia and Quercus suber. They mine the leaves of their host plant.

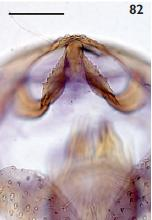
Male genitalia

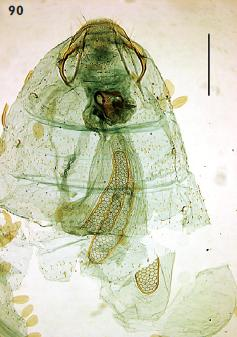
Female genitalia

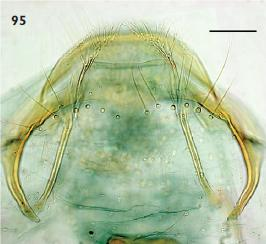
Female terminal abdominal segment
