= Ectoedemia rosiphila =

Scientific classification
- Kingdom: Animalia
- Phylum: Arthropoda
- Class: Insecta
- Order: Lepidoptera
- Family: Nepticulidae
- Genus: Ectoedemia
- Species: E. rosiphila

Binomial name
- Ectoedemia rosiphila Puplesis, 1992

Species of moth

Ectoedemia rosiphila is a moth of the family Nepticulidae. It was described by Rimantas Puplesis in 1990. It is known from Kazakhstan and Tadzhikistan.

The larvae feed on Rosa fedtschenkoana. They mine the leaves of their host plant.
