= Ectoedemia rubifoliella =

Scientific classification
- Kingdom: Animalia
- Phylum: Arthropoda
- Clade: Pancrustacea
- Class: Insecta
- Order: Lepidoptera
- Family: Nepticulidae
- Genus: Ectoedemia
- Species: E. rubifoliella

Binomial name
- Ectoedemia rubifoliella (Clemens, 1860)

Synonyms
- Nepticula rubifoliella Clemens, 1860

Species of moth

Ectoedemia rubifoliella is a moth of the family Nepticulidae. It is indigenous to southeastern Canada and the US states of Ohio, Kentucky, Pennsylvania, and North Carolina.

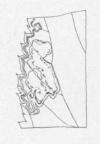
Mine

Its wingspan is about 4 mm.

The larvae feed by mining the leaves of blackberry bushes. This begins with a very narrow linear mine following a vein or the margin of the leaf closely before enlarging into an irregular blotch. Mines containing larvae may be collected in July and September. The larvae are pale green and the cocoon is dark brown.
