= Ectoedemia nylstroomensis =

Scientific classification
- Kingdom: Animalia
- Phylum: Arthropoda
- Clade: Pancrustacea
- Class: Insecta
- Order: Lepidoptera
- Family: Nepticulidae
- Genus: Ectoedemia
- Species: E. nylstroomensis

Binomial name
- Ectoedemia nylstroomensis Scoble, 1983

Species of moth

Ectoedemia nylstroomensis is a moth of the family Nepticulidae. It was described by Scoble in 1983. It is known from South Africa (it was described from Transvaal).
