= Ectoedemia viridissimella =

Scientific classification
- Kingdom: Animalia
- Phylum: Arthropoda
- Class: Insecta
- Order: Lepidoptera
- Family: Nepticulidae
- Genus: Ectoedemia
- Species: E. viridissimella

Binomial name
- Ectoedemia viridissimella (Caradja, 1920)

Synonyms
- Nepticula viridissimella Caradja, 1920; Nepticula nowakowskii Toll, 1957

Species of moth

Ectoedemia viridissimella is a moth of the family Nepticulidae. It is found in Poland, the Czech Republic, Austria and Italy.

The wingspan is 5.2–5.4 mm. Adults are on wing in May. There is probably one generation per year.

The larvae feed on Peucedanum cervaria. They mine the leaves of their host plant.
