= Ectoedemia grandisella =

Scientific classification
- Kingdom: Animalia
- Phylum: Arthropoda
- Clade: Pancrustacea
- Class: Insecta
- Order: Lepidoptera
- Family: Nepticulidae
- Genus: Ectoedemia
- Species: E. grandisella

Binomial name
- Ectoedemia grandisella (Chambers, 1878)

Synonyms
- Nepticula grandisella Chambers, 1878

Species of moth

Ectoedemia grandisella is a moth of the family Nepticulidae. It is found in Texas, United States.
