= Ectoedemia liechtensteini =

Scientific classification
- Kingdom: Animalia
- Phylum: Arthropoda
- Class: Insecta
- Order: Lepidoptera
- Family: Nepticulidae
- Genus: Ectoedemia
- Species: E. liechtensteini

Binomial name
- Ectoedemia liechtensteini (Zimmermann, 1944)

Synonyms
- Nepticula liechtensteini Zimmermann, 1944

Species of moth

Ectoedemia liechtensteini is a moth of the family Nepticulidae. It is found from the Czech Republic and Slovakia to Austria and Serbia.

The wingspan is 4.4-5.2 mm. Adults are on wing from April to June. There is one generation per year.

The larvae feed on Quercus cerris. They mine the leaves of their host plant. The mine is identical to that of Ectoedemia heringi.
