= Ectoedemia subnitescens =

Scientific classification
- Kingdom: Animalia
- Phylum: Arthropoda
- Class: Insecta
- Order: Lepidoptera
- Family: Nepticulidae
- Genus: Ectoedemia
- Species: E. subnitescens

Binomial name
- Ectoedemia subnitescens (Meyrick, 1937)

Species of moth

Ectoedemia subnitescens is a moth of the family Nepticulidae. It was described by Edward Meyrick in 1937. It is known from South Africa (it was described from the Cape Province).
