= Ectoedemia alexandria =

Scientific classification
- Kingdom: Animalia
- Phylum: Arthropoda
- Class: Insecta
- Order: Lepidoptera
- Family: Nepticulidae
- Genus: Ectoedemia
- Species: E. alexandria

Binomial name
- Ectoedemia alexandria Scoble, 1983

Species of moth

Ectoedemia alexandria is a moth of the family Nepticulidae. It was described by Scoble in 1983. It is known from South Africa (it was described from the Cape Province).

The larvae feed on Scutia myrtina.
