= Ectoedemia commiphorella =

Scientific classification
- Kingdom: Animalia
- Phylum: Arthropoda
- Clade: Pancrustacea
- Class: Insecta
- Order: Lepidoptera
- Family: Nepticulidae
- Genus: Ectoedemia
- Species: E. commiphorella

Binomial name
- Ectoedemia commiphorella Scoble, 1978

Species of moth

Ectoedemia commiphorella is a moth of the family Nepticulidae. It was described by Scoble in 1978. It is known from South Africa (it was described from the Langjan Nature Reserve).

The larvae feed on Commiphora pyracanthoides.
