= Ectoedemia permira =

Scientific classification
- Kingdom: Animalia
- Phylum: Arthropoda
- Class: Insecta
- Order: Lepidoptera
- Family: Nepticulidae
- Genus: Ectoedemia
- Species: E. permira

Binomial name
- Ectoedemia permira (Puplesis, 1984)

Synonyms
- Fomoria permira Puplesis, 1984

Species of moth

Ectoedemia permira is a moth of the family Nepticulidae. It was described by R.K. Puplesis in 1984. It is known from the Russian Far East and China.

The larvae feed on Hypericum attenuatum.
