= Ectoedemia peterseni =

Scientific classification
- Kingdom: Animalia
- Phylum: Arthropoda
- Class: Insecta
- Order: Lepidoptera
- Family: Nepticulidae
- Genus: Ectoedemia
- Species: E. peterseni

Binomial name
- Ectoedemia peterseni (Puplesis, 1985)

Synonyms
- Obrussa peterseni Puplesis, 1985; Etainia peterseni

Species of moth

Ectoedemia peterseni is a moth of the family Nepticulidae. It was described by Puplesis in 1985. It is known from the Russian Far East and Japan.

The larvae probably feed on Acer species.
