= Ectoedemia obtusa =

Scientific classification
- Kingdom: Animalia
- Phylum: Arthropoda
- Class: Insecta
- Order: Lepidoptera
- Family: Nepticulidae
- Genus: Ectoedemia
- Species: E. obtusa

Binomial name
- Ectoedemia obtusa (Puplesis & Diskus, 1996)

Synonyms
- Etainia obtusa Puplesis & Diskus, 1996

Species of moth

Ectoedemia obtusa is a moth of the family Nepticulidae. It is found in Spain, France, Italy, Croatia and in Turkmenistan. It is probably also present elsewhere on the Balkan Peninsula and in Turkey and Iran.

Adults are on wing in May and June.

The larvae are thought to feed on Fraxinus species.
