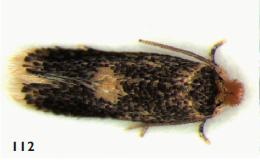

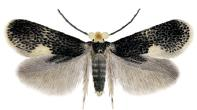

Scientific classification
- Kingdom: Animalia
- Phylum: Arthropoda
- Class: Insecta
- Order: Lepidoptera
- Family: Nepticulidae
- Genus: Ectoedemia
- Species: E. heringella

Binomial name
- Ectoedemia heringella (Mariani, 1939)

Synonyms
- Nepticula heringella Mariani, 1939

= Ectoedemia heringella =

Species of moth

Ectoedemia heringella is a moth of the family Nepticulidae. It is found in the Mediterranean Region, from southern France, Corsica, Sardinia, and Italy to Cyprus. It was first recorded from Great Britain in 2002.

The wingspan is 4.4–6 mm. The forewing usually has white scales along the costa, opposite the dorsal spot, but not forming a distinct spot. In males the hindwing upperside and forewing underside have an elongate patch of brown androconial scales. >

Adults are on wing from late April to the end of June. There is one generation per year.

The larvae feed on Quercus alnifolia and Quercus ilex. They mine the leaves of their host plant.

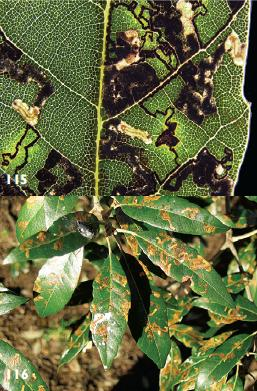
Mines and larvae on Quercus ilex

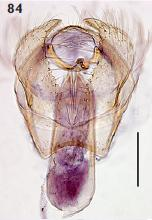
Male genitalia

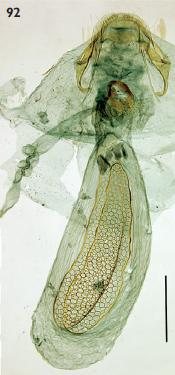
Female genitalia

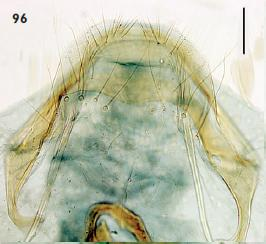
Female terminal abdominal segment
