= Ectoedemia scobleella =

Scientific classification
- Kingdom: Animalia
- Phylum: Arthropoda
- Clade: Pancrustacea
- Class: Insecta
- Order: Lepidoptera
- Family: Nepticulidae
- Genus: Ectoedemia
- Species: E. scobleella

Binomial name
- Ectoedemia scobleella Minet, 2004

Species of moth

Ectoedemia scobleella is a moth of the family Nepticulidae. It was described by Joël Minet in 2004. It is known from Madagascar.
