= Ectoedemia monemvasiae =

Scientific classification
- Kingdom: Animalia
- Phylum: Arthropoda
- Clade: Pancrustacea
- Class: Insecta
- Order: Lepidoptera
- Family: Nepticulidae
- Genus: Ectoedemia
- Species: E. monemvasiae

Binomial name
- Ectoedemia monemvasiae van Nieukerken, 1985

Species of moth

Ectoedemia monemvasiae is a moth of the family Nepticulidae. It is found in Greece (Peloponnesos) and Turkey (Anatolia).

The wingspan is 6.5-7.5 mm. Adults have been caught in July and early August.

Unlike most other Nepticulidae species, the larvae mine the bark of their host, rather than the leaves. The host plant is probably a Fagaceae species.
