= Ectoedemia simiicola =

Scientific classification
- Kingdom: Animalia
- Phylum: Arthropoda
- Clade: Pancrustacea
- Class: Insecta
- Order: Lepidoptera
- Family: Nepticulidae
- Genus: Ectoedemia
- Species: E. simiicola

Binomial name
- Ectoedemia simiicola Scoble, 1983

Species of moth

Ectoedemia simiicola is a moth of the family Nepticulidae. It was described by Scoble in 1983. It is known from South Africa (it was described from the Cape Province).

The larvae feed on Diospyros dichrophylla.
