= Ectoedemia lucidae =

Scientific classification
- Kingdom: Animalia
- Phylum: Arthropoda
- Clade: Pancrustacea
- Class: Insecta
- Order: Lepidoptera
- Family: Nepticulidae
- Genus: Ectoedemia
- Species: E. lucidae

Binomial name
- Ectoedemia lucidae Scoble, 1983

Species of moth

Ectoedemia lucidae is a moth of the family Nepticulidae. It was described by Scoble in 1983. It is known from South Africa (it was described from the Golden Gate National Park in the Orange Free State).

The larvae feed on Halleria lucida.
