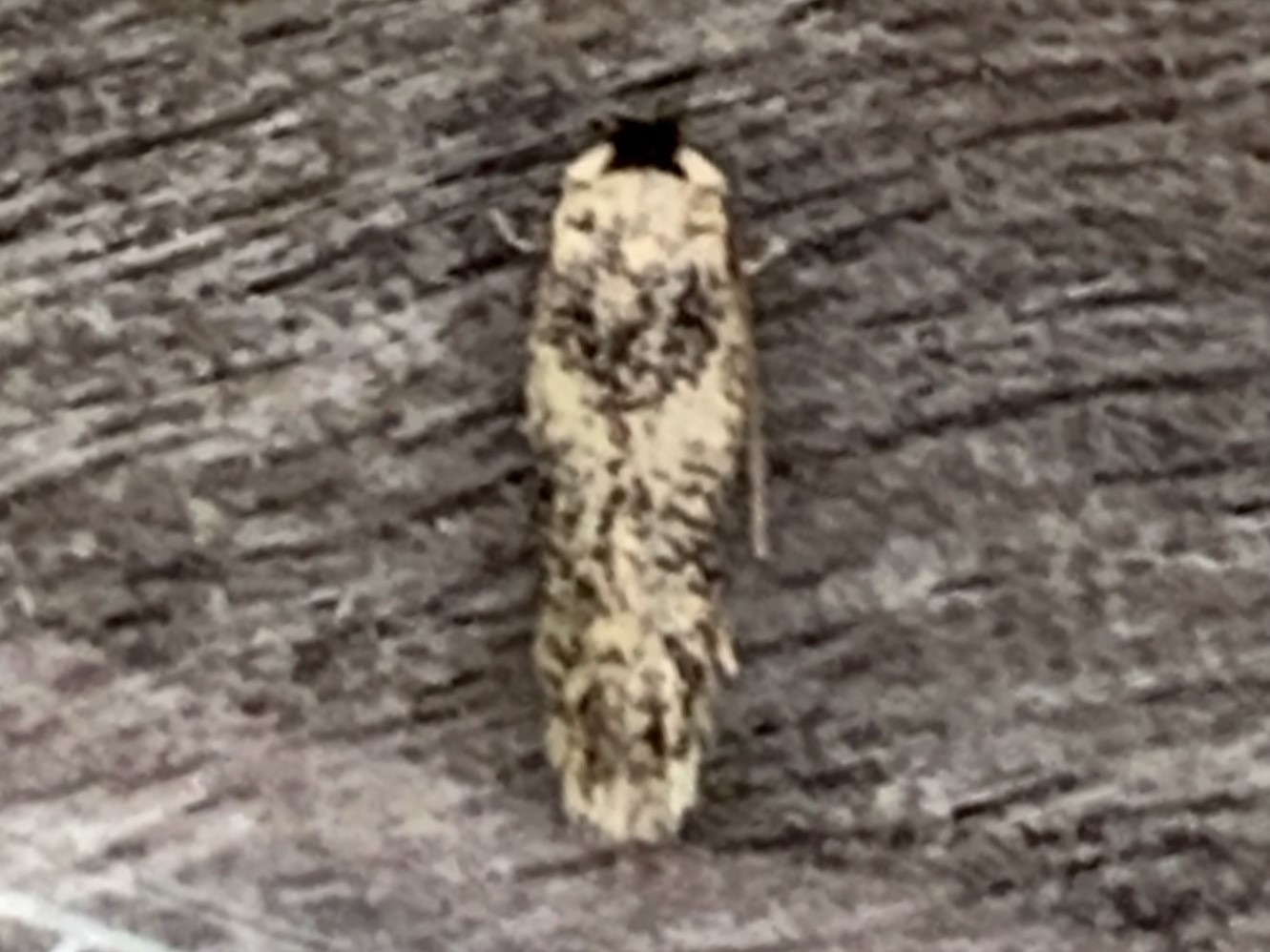

Conservation status
- Unrankable (NatureServe)

Scientific classification
- Kingdom: Animalia
- Phylum: Arthropoda
- Clade: Pancrustacea
- Class: Insecta
- Order: Lepidoptera
- Family: Nepticulidae
- Genus: Zimmermannia
- Species: Z. bosquella

Binomial name
- Zimmermannia bosquella (Chambers, 1878)

Synonyms
- Ectodemia castanaeae [lapsus]; Ectoedemia bosquella (Chambers, 1878); Ectoedemia castaneae Busck, 1913; Ectoedemia heinrichi Busck, 1914; Ectoedemia helenella Wilkinson, 1981; Ectoedemia obrutella sensu Wilkinson & Newton, 1981; Nepticula bosqueella Chambers, 1878; Nepticula bosquella Chambers, 1878; Opostega bosqueella (Chambers, 1878)

= Zimmermannia bosquella =

Species of moth

Zimmermannia bosquella is a moth of the family Nepticulidae. It is found in Virginia, Ohio, and Kentucky in the United States. It is now classified as conspecific with the American chestnut moth, which was formerly considered as extinct.

== Description ==
The wingspan is 9–10 mm. The larvae are full grown in October and early November, producing adults in May and June of the following year.

== Behaviour and ecology ==
The larvae feed on Quercus palustris. They mine the leaves of their host plant.

The moth's synergistic relationship with the North American nut species led to a catastrophic population decline when almost all of the American chestnut trees fell victim to chestnut blight. The American chestnut tree was driven almost to extinction, and the American chestnut moth was thought to be extinct. The American chestnut tree moth was later found to still be extant within populations of Zimmermannia bosquella.
