= Ectoedemia haraldi =

Scientific classification
- Kingdom: Animalia
- Phylum: Arthropoda
- Class: Insecta
- Order: Lepidoptera
- Family: Nepticulidae
- Genus: Ectoedemia
- Species: E. haraldi

Binomial name
- Ectoedemia haraldi (Soffner, 1942)

Synonyms
- Nepticula haraldi Soffner, 1942; Stigmella prinophyllella Le Marchand, 1946

Species of moth

Ectoedemia haraldi is a moth of the family Nepticulidae. It is found in the Mediterranean Region from the Iberian Peninsula and southern France to Greece. It is also found on Corsica and Crete.

The wingspan is 5.8-7.1 mm. Adults are on wing from April to June. There is one generation per year.

The larvae feed on Quercus coccifera, Quercus ilex, Quercus ilex rotundifolia and Quercus suber. They mine the leaves of their host plant.

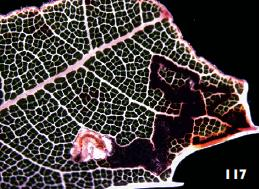
Mine and larvae on Quercus coccifera

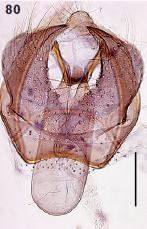
Male genitalia

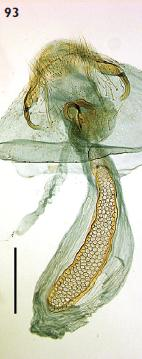
Female genitalia

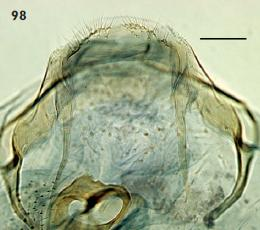
Female terminal abdominal segment
