= Ectoedemia hispanica =

Scientific classification
- Kingdom: Animalia
- Phylum: Arthropoda
- Clade: Pancrustacea
- Class: Insecta
- Order: Lepidoptera
- Family: Nepticulidae
- Genus: Ectoedemia
- Species: E. hispanica

Binomial name
- Ectoedemia hispanica van Nieukerken, 1985

Species of moth

Ectoedemia hispanica is a moth of the family Nepticulidae. It is endemic to eastern and southern Spain.

The wingspan is 6.2-6.8 mm.E. hispanica closely resembles Ectoedemia atrifrontella, both have a pale thorax, but overall hispanica is paler and less contrasting and the thorax more yellowish than in atrifrontella. Adults have been caught in July.

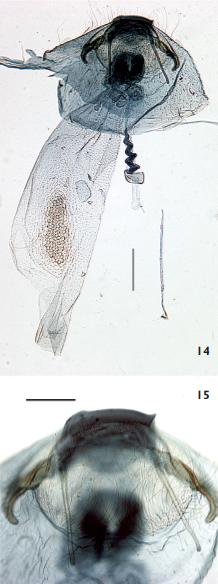
Female genitalia

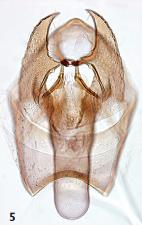
Male genitalia
