= Euphorbia obtusifolia =

The scientific name Euphorbia obtusifolia has been used for at least three species of Euphorbia:

- Euphorbia obtusifolia Lam. is a synonym of Euphorbia terracina L., native from Macaronesia through Hungary and the Mediterranean to the Arabian Peninsula
- Euphorbia obtusifolia Poir. is an illegitimate name that has been applied to:
  - Euphorbia lamarckii Sweet – of which it is a synonym; native to the western Canary Islands (Tenerife, La Gomera, La Palma and El Hierro); also known by the synonym Euphorbia broussonetii
  - Euphorbia regis-jubae J.Gay – with which it has been confused; native to the eastern Canary Islands (Gran Canaria, Lanzarote and Fuerteventura), west Morocco and north-western Western Sahara
