= Ectoedemia anguinella =

Scientific classification
- Kingdom: Animalia
- Phylum: Arthropoda
- Clade: Pancrustacea
- Class: Insecta
- Order: Lepidoptera
- Family: Nepticulidae
- Genus: Ectoedemia
- Species: E. anguinella

Binomial name
- Ectoedemia anguinella (Clemens, 1864)

Synonyms
- Nepticula anguinella Clemens, 1861

Species of moth

Ectoedemia anguinella is a moth of the family Nepticulidae. It was described by James Brackenridge Clemens in 1864. It was described from the US state of Kentucky.
