= Ectoedemia trifasciata =

Scientific classification
- Kingdom: Animalia
- Phylum: Arthropoda
- Class: Insecta
- Order: Lepidoptera
- Family: Nepticulidae
- Genus: Ectoedemia
- Species: E. trifasciata

Binomial name
- Ectoedemia trifasciata (Matsumura, 1931)

Synonyms
- Nepticula trifasciata Matsumura, 1931

Species of moth

Ectoedemia trifasciata is a moth of the family Nepticulidae. It was described by Shōnen Matsumura in 1931. It is known from the Russian Far East and Japan (including Hokkaido).
