= Ectoedemia diskusi =

Species of moth

Hesperolyra diskusi is a moth of the family Nepticulidae. It was originally described as Fomoria diskusi by Puplesis & Robinson in 2000, based on a male holotype collected in the Chiquibul Forest Reserve, Las Cuevas, Cayo District, Belize.

In 2016, van Nieukerken, Stonis, Remeikis & Diškus established the genus Hesperolyra, designating H. diskusi as its type species.

== Description ==
Adults are recognized by a pale costal streak forming an oblique fascia at two-thirds of the forewing, and distinctive features in the male genitalia.

== Distribution ==
The species is only known from Belize. The larval host plant has not yet been documented.

== Taxonomy ==
- Fomoria diskusi Puplesis & Robinson, 2000 (original combination)
- Hesperolyra diskusi (Puplesis & Robinson, 2000) (current valid name)
