= List of moths of South Africa (Nepticulidae) =

This is a list of moths of the family Nepticulidae that are found in South Africa. It also acts as an index to the species articles and forms part of the full List of moths of South Africa.

- Acalyptris acumenta (Scoble, 1980)
- Acalyptris bispinata (Scoble, 1980)
- Acalyptris combretella (Vári, 1955)
- Acalyptris fagarivora (Vári, 1955)
- Acalyptris fulva (Scoble, 1980)
- Acalyptris fuscofascia (Scoble, 1980)
- Acalyptris krooni (Scoble, 1980)
- Acalyptris lanneivora (Vári, 1955)
- Acalyptris lorantivora (Janse, 1948)
- Acalyptris lundiensis (Scoble, 1980)
- Acalyptris mariepsensis (Scoble, 1980)
- Acalyptris molleivora (Scoble, 1980)
- Acalyptris obliquella (Scoble, 1980)
- Acalyptris pundaensis (Scoble, 1980)
- Acalyptris rubiaevora (Scoble, 1980)
- Acalyptris sellata (Scoble, 1980)
- Acalyptris umdoniensis (Scoble, 1980)
- Acalyptris vacuolata (Scoble, 1980)
- Acalyptris vepricola (Vári, 1963)
- Acalyptris vumbaensis (Scoble, 1980)
- Acalyptris zepheriae (Scoble, 1980)
- Areticulata leucosideae Scoble, 1983
- Ectoedemia alexandria Scoble, 1983
- Ectoedemia bicarina Scoble, 1983
- Ectoedemia capensis Scoble, 1983
- Ectoedemia commiphorella Scoble, 1978
- Ectoedemia craspedota (Vári, 1963)
- Ectoedemia crispae Scoble, 1983
- Ectoedemia denticulata Scoble, 1983
- Ectoedemia digitata Scoble, 1983
- Ectoedemia furcella Scoble, 1983
- Ectoedemia fuscata (Janse, 1948)
- Ectoedemia grandinosa (Meyrick, 1911)
- Ectoedemia guerkiae Scoble, 1983
- Ectoedemia gymnosporiae (Vári, 1955)
- Ectoedemia hobohmi (Janse, 1948)
- Ectoedemia incisaevora Scoble, 1983
- Ectoedemia indicaevora Scoble, 1983
- Ectoedemia insulata (Meyrick, 1911)
- Ectoedemia jupiteri Scoble, 1983
- Ectoedemia knysnaensis Scoble, 1983
- Ectoedemia kowynensis Scoble, 1983
- Ectoedemia leptodictyae Scoble, 1983
- Ectoedemia limburgensis Scoble, 1983
- Ectoedemia lucidae Scoble, 1983
- Ectoedemia macrochaeta (Meyrick, 1921)
- Ectoedemia malelanensis Scoble, 1983
- Ectoedemia maritima Scoble, 1983
- Ectoedemia mauni Scoble, 1979
- Ectoedemia myrtinaecola Scoble, 1983
- Ectoedemia nigrimacula (Janse, 1948)
- Ectoedemia nigrisquama Scoble, 1983
- Ectoedemia nylstroomensis Scoble, 1983
- Ectoedemia oleivora (Vári, 1955)
- Ectoedemia pappeivora (Vári, 1963)
- Ectoedemia portensis Scoble, 1983
- Ectoedemia primaria (Meyrick, 1913)
- Ectoedemia psarodes (Vári, 1963)
- Ectoedemia rhabdophora Scoble, 1983
- Ectoedemia royenicola (Vári, 1955)
- Ectoedemia scabridae Scoble, 1983
- Ectoedemia simiicola Scoble, 1983
- Ectoedemia stimulata (Meyrick, 1913)
- Ectoedemia subnitescens (Meyrick, 1937)
- Ectoedemia tecomariae (Vári, 1955)
- Ectoedemia thermae Scoble, 1983
- Ectoedemia umdoniella Scoble, 1983
- Ectoedemia undatae Scoble, 1983
- Ectoedemia vannifera (Meyrick, 1914)
- Ectoedemia wilkinsoni Scoble, 1983
- Etainia crypsixantha (Meyrick, 1918)
- Etainia krugerensis (Scoble, 1983)
- Etainia nigricapitella (Janse, 1948)
- Etainia zimbabwiensis (Scoble, 1983)
- Simplimorpha lanceifoliella (Vári, 1955)
- Stigmella abachausi (Janse, 1948)
- Stigmella abutilonica Scoble, 1978
- Stigmella allophylica Scoble, 1978
- Stigmella ampullata Scoble, 1978
- Stigmella androflava Scoble, 1978
- Stigmella angustivalva Scoble, 1978
- Stigmella caliginosa (Meyrick, 1921)
- Stigmella celtifoliella Vári, 1955
- Stigmella charistis Vári, 1963
- Stigmella confinalis Scoble, 1978
- Stigmella crotonica Scoble, 1978
- Stigmella dombeyivora Scoble, 1978
- Stigmella fluida (Meyrick, 1911)
- Stigmella galactacma (Meyrick, 1924)
- Stigmella generalis Scoble, 1978
- Stigmella geranica Scoble, 1978
- Stigmella grewiae Scoble, 1978
- Stigmella hortorum Scoble, 1978
- Stigmella ingens (Meyrick, 1913)
- Stigmella irrorata (Janse, 1948)
- Stigmella krugeri Vári, 1963
- Stigmella letabensis Scoble, 1978
- Stigmella liota Vári, 1963
- Stigmella nigrata (Meyrick, 1913)
- Stigmella panconista (Meyrick, 1920)
- Stigmella parinarella Vári, 1955
- Stigmella perplexa (Janse, 1948)
- Stigmella platyzona Vári, 1963
- Stigmella porphyreuta (Meyrick, 1917)
- Stigmella potgieteri Scoble, 1978
- Stigmella pretoriata Scoble, 1978
- Stigmella protosema (Meyrick, 1921)
- Stigmella rhynchosiella Vári, 1955
- Stigmella satarensis Scoble, 1978
- Stigmella tragilis Scoble, 1978
- Stigmella triumfettica Scoble, 1978
- Stigmella urbica (Meyrick, 1913)
- Stigmella varii Scoble, 1978
- Stigmella worcesteri Scoble, 1983
- Stigmella xuthomitra (Meyrick, 1921)
- Trifurcula barbertonensis Scoble, 1980
- Trifurcula pulla Scoble, 1980
- Varius ochnicolus (Vári, 1955)
