= Acalyptris martinheringi =

Scientific classification
- Kingdom: Animalia
- Phylum: Arthropoda
- Clade: Pancrustacea
- Class: Insecta
- Order: Lepidoptera
- Family: Nepticulidae
- Genus: Acalyptris
- Species: A. martinheringi

Binomial name
- Acalyptris martinheringi Puplesis & Robinson, 2000

Species of moth

Acalyptris martinheringi is a species of moth of the family Nepticulidae. Formally described by Rimantas Puplesis and Gaden S. Robinson in 2000, it is endemic to Belize. It is known from the Chiquibul Forest Reserve in the Cayo District. It is a small species, with males having a wingspan of 4.7–5.6 mm (0.19–0.22 in) and a forewing length of 2.1–2.5 mm (0.083–0.098 in).

== Taxonomy ==
Acalyptris martinheringi was formally described in 2000 by Rimantas Puplesis and Gaden S. Robinson based on an adult male specimen collected from the Chiquibul Forest Reserve in the Cayo District of Belize. It is named after Martin Hering, an entomologist specializing the study of leaf-miner moths. It is part of the A. fortis species group within the genus.

== Description ==
Acalyptris martinheringi is a small species, with males having a wingspan of 4.7–5.6 mm (0.19–0.22 in) and a forewing length of 2.1–2.5 mm (0.083–0.098 in). The forewing is cream-colored finely speckled with yellowish-brown to brown, densest near the costa and palest at the base and tip. The cilia of the forewing are cream-colored, while the undersurface is brownish. The lance-shaped hindwing is yellowish-cream, with cream-colored cilia. The thorax and tegulae are cream-colored with some brown. The head has cream-colored palps and a brownish-orange to brown frontal tuft. The legs are cream-colored and the antennae are brown to brownish-orange.

== Distribution ==
Acalyptris martinheringi is endemic to Belize, where it is known from the Chiquibul Forest Reserve, Pook’s Hill Nature Reserve, and San Ignacio, all located in the Cayo District. It inhabits rainforests and secondary forests
