= Acalyptris fortis =

Scientific classification
- Kingdom: Animalia
- Phylum: Arthropoda
- Clade: Pancrustacea
- Class: Insecta
- Order: Lepidoptera
- Family: Nepticulidae
- Genus: Acalyptris
- Species: A. fortis

Binomial name
- Acalyptris fortis Puplesis & Robinson, 2000

Species of moth

Acalyptris fortis is a species of moth of the family Nepticulidae. Formally described by Rimantas Puplesis and Gaden S. Robinson in 2000, it is endemic to Belize. It is known from the Chiquibul Forest Reserve, Pook's Hill Nature Reserve, and San Ignacio, all located within the Cayo District, and inhabits rainforests and secondary forests. It is a small species, with males having a wingspan of 4.1–4.3 mm (0.16–0.17 in) and a forewing length of 1.8–1.9 mm (0.071–0.075 in).

== Taxonomy ==
Acalyptris fortis was formally described in 2000 by Rimantas Puplesis and Gaden S. Robinson based on an adult male specimen collected from the San Ignacio in the Cayo District of Belize. It is named for its "strongly armed and relatively large male genitalia". It is part of the A. fortis species group within the genus.

== Description ==
Acalyptris fortis is a small species, with males having a wingspan of 4.1–4.3 mm (0.16–0.17 in) and a forewing length of 1.8–1.9 mm (0.071–0.075 in). The forewing is dark grayish-brown, with a cream area towards the further end that is densely marked with brownish to blackish speckles. There is a thin blackish region along the costa. The cilia of the forewing are cream-colored, while the undersurface is dark grayish-brown. The ochre-cream hindwing is lance-shaped, with cream-colored cilia. The thorax is cream-colored with some fine brown speckles. The head has light brownish-cream palps and a brownish-orange frontal tuft. The abdomen is cream-colored. The legs are cream-colored and the antennae are brown.

== Distribution ==
Acalyptris fortis is endemic to Belize, where it is known from the Chiquibul Forest Reserve, Pook's Hill Nature Reserve, and San Ignacio, all located within the Cayo District. It inhabits rainforests and secondary forests.
