= Acalyptris novenarius =

Scientific classification
- Kingdom: Animalia
- Phylum: Arthropoda
- Clade: Pancrustacea
- Class: Insecta
- Order: Lepidoptera
- Family: Nepticulidae
- Genus: Acalyptris
- Species: A. novenarius

Binomial name
- Acalyptris novenarius Puplesis & Robinson, 2000

Species of moth

Acalyptris novenarius is a moth of the family Nepticulidae. Formally described by Rimantas Puplesis and Gaden S. Robinson in 2000, it is endemic to Belize. It is known from the Chiquibul Forest Reserve in the Cayo District. It is a small species, with males having a wingspan of 4.8–5.1 mm (0.19–0.20 in) and a forewing length of 2.2–2.3 mm (0.087–0.091 in).

== Taxonomy ==
Acalyptris novenarius was formally described in 2000 by Rimantas Puplesis and Gaden S. Robinson based on an adult male specimen collected from the Chiquibul Forest Reserve in the Cayo District of Belize. It is closely related to, but not part of, the A. murex species group within the genus.

== Description ==
Acalyptris novenarius is a small species, with males having a wingspan of 4.8–5.1 mm (0.19–0.20 in) and a forewing length of 2.2–2.3 mm (0.087–0.091 in). The forewing is grey with a purple or blue gloss. The cilia of the forewing are grey, while the undersurface is greyish-brown. The hindwing is grey, with similarly-colored cilia. The thorax and tegulae are greyish-brown, occasionally speckled black. The head has greyish- to brownish-cream palps and a brownish-orange to brownish-yellow frontal tuft. The legs are light to dark greyish-brown above and cream to brownish-cream below, while the antennae are light brown to orangish-brown.

== Distribution ==
Acalyptris novenarius is endemic to Belize, where it is known from the Las Cuevas Biological Station in the Chiquibul Forest Reserve in the Cayo District.
