= Acalyptris unicornis =

Scientific classification
- Kingdom: Animalia
- Phylum: Arthropoda
- Clade: Pancrustacea
- Class: Insecta
- Order: Lepidoptera
- Family: Nepticulidae
- Genus: Acalyptris
- Species: A. unicornis

Binomial name
- Acalyptris unicornis Puplesis & Robinson, 2000

Species of moth

Acalyptris unicornis is a moth of the family Nepticulidae. Formally described by Rimantas Puplesis and Gaden S. Robinson in 2000, it is endemic to Belize. It is known from the Chiquibul Forest Reserve in the Cayo District. It is a small species, with males having a wingspan of 4.4–4.5 mm (0.17–0.18 in) and a forewing length of 1.8–1.9 mm (0.071–0.075 in).

== Taxonomy ==
Acalyptris unicornis was formally described in 2000 by Rimantas Puplesis and Gaden S. Robinson based on an adult male specimen collected from the Chiquibul Forest Reserve in the Cayo District of Belize. The species is named after its "single large cornutus" and "ventrally-directed spine" on its uncus, both of which are unusual derived features for its genus. It is part of the A. peteni species group within the genus.

== Description ==
Acalyptris unicornis is a small species, with males having a wingspan of 4.4–4.5 mm (0.17–0.18 in) and a forewing length of 1.8–1.9 mm (0.071–0.075 in). The forewing is cream-coloured with grey and fuscous speckling. The cilia of the forewing are grey-cream, while the undersurface is cream-colored. The cream-coloured, lance-shaped hindwing is somewhat slender, with similarly colored cilia. The thorax and tegulae are mostly cream. The abdomen is brownish-cream to grey. The head has cream palps and an ochre-orange frontal tuft. The legs are cream-coloured and the antennae are brown. Although drab in appearance, the species has uniquely-shaped male genitalia.

== Distribution ==
Acalyptris unicornis is endemic to Belize, where it is known from the Las Cuevas Biological Station in the Chiquibul Forest Reserve in the Cayo District.
