= Acalyptris trifidus =

Scientific classification
- Kingdom: Animalia
- Phylum: Arthropoda
- Clade: Pancrustacea
- Class: Insecta
- Order: Lepidoptera
- Family: Nepticulidae
- Genus: Acalyptris
- Species: A. trifidus

Binomial name
- Acalyptris trifidus Puplesis & Robinson, 2000

Species of moth

Acalyptris trifidus is a moth of the family Nepticulidae. Formally described by Rimantas Puplesis and Gaden S. Robinson in 2000, it is endemic to Belize. It is known from the Chiquibul Forest Reserve in the Cayo District. It is a small species, with males having a wingspan of 5.1–5.4 mm (0.20–0.21 in) and a forewing length of 2–2.4 mm (0.08–0.09 in).

== Taxonomy ==
Acalyptris trifidus was formally described in 2000 by Rimantas Puplesis and Gaden S. Robinson based on an adult male specimen collected from the Chiquibul Forest Reserve in the Cayo District of Belize. It is part of the A. trifidus species group within the genus.

== Description ==
Acalyptris trifidus is a small species, with males having a wingspan of 5.1–5.4 mm (0.20–0.21 in) and a forewing length of 2–2.4 mm (0.08–0.09 in). The forewing is cream with brownish-black postmedian fascia. The cilia of the forewing are cream and the undersurface is cream-brown. The hindwing is cream-brown with cream cilia. The thorax and tegulae are cream-coloured. The abdomen is purely cream in colour. The head has cream-coloured palps and an extremely light yellowish-cream frontal tuft. The legs are cream-coloured and the antennae are ochre with a cream wash.

== Distribution ==
Acalyptris trifidus is endemic to Belize, where it is known from the Las Cuevas Biological Station in the Chiquibul Forest Reserve in the Cayo District. The caterpillars of this moth feed on Lonchocarpus lineatus.
