= Acalyptris lesbia =

Scientific classification
- Kingdom: Animalia
- Phylum: Arthropoda
- Clade: Pancrustacea
- Class: Insecta
- Order: Lepidoptera
- Family: Nepticulidae
- Genus: Acalyptris
- Species: A. lesbia

Binomial name
- Acalyptris lesbia van Nieukerken & Hull, 2007

Species of moth

Acalyptris lesbia is a species of moth of the family Nepticulidae. It is only known from Skala Kallonis on Lesbos in Greece. The wingspan is 4-4.8 mm. The larvae feed on Limonium gmelinii. They mine the leaves of their host plant.

== Taxonomy ==
The species was formally described in 2007 as Acalyptris lesbia based on specimens collected from the island of Lesbos in Greece. The specific epithet comes from the Latin adjective lesbius, denoting an inhabitant of Lesbos.

== Description ==
Adult males have forewings 1.7–2.1 mm long and a total wingspan of 4.0–4.6 mm. The frontal tuft and collar on the head are white or ochre with dark grey scales. The antennae have 28–34 segments; the scape (first segment) is hidden by the tuft and the flagellum (all segments excluding the first two) is grey. The thorax and forewing are mostly white, speckled with brown-tipped scales. The cilia (fine hairs along the edge of the wing) are also white and a cilia line is present. The hindwing is narrow and grey with bristles along the side. The underside of both wings is dark brown or grey and the abdomen is dark grey . The prominent anal tufts are yellow. In adult females, the forewings are 1.9–2.2 mm long and the total wingspan is 4.4–4.8 mm. There are 29–31 segments in the antennae and the tip of the abdomen is rounded, with no anal tufts.

The leafmines made by the larvae are full-depth and initially twisted or spiral, later following a more linear path through the leaf. The frass is narrow, broken, and brown. Exit holes are on the upper side of the leaf. Leafmines made by A. lesbia are indistinguishable from those made by A. maritima or A. limonii.

== Distribution ==
Acalyptris lesbia is endemic to the island of Lesbos on Greece, where it has only been recorded from Skala Kallonis beach. It feeds exclusively on the plant Limonium gmelinii, which grows along the margins of dunes, in sand near the sea or in grass near salt marsh.

== Biology ==
It only feeds on Limonium gmelinii. It has a white cocoon which it spins on the underside of leaves.
