= Acalyptris laxibasis =

Scientific classification
- Kingdom: Animalia
- Phylum: Arthropoda
- Clade: Pancrustacea
- Class: Insecta
- Order: Lepidoptera
- Family: Nepticulidae
- Genus: Acalyptris
- Species: A. laxibasis

Binomial name
- Acalyptris laxibasis Puplesis & Robinson, 2000

Species of moth

Acalyptris laxibasis is a species of moth of the family Nepticulidae. Formally described by Rimantas Puplesis and Gaden S. Robinson in 2000, it is endemic to Belize. It is known from the Chiquibul Forest Reserve in the Cayo District. It is a small species, with males having a wingspan of 4.9 mm (0.19 in) and a forewing length of 2.0 mm (0.079 in).

== Taxonomy ==
Acalyptris laxibasis was formally described in 2000 by Rimantas Puplesis and Gaden S. Robinson based on an adult male specimen collected from the Chiquibul Forest Reserve in the Cayo District of Belize. It is part of the A. murex species group within the genus.

== Description ==
Acalyptris laxibasis is a small species, with males having a wingspan of 4.9 mm (0.19 in) and a forewing length of 2.0 mm (0.079 in). The forewing is light yellowish-cream to wholly cream in color, finely speckled with brown to grey that is densest near the base and near the costa. More distally, there are two stripes, a blackish-brown postmedian one and a yellowish-cream near the tip of the forewing. The cilia of the forewing are yellowish-cream to cream, while the undersurface is light brownish-cream to cream-colored. The hindwing is greyish-cream, with similarly coloured cilia. The thorax and tegulae are cream-colored, the latter speckled with brown. The head has cream-colored palps and a brownish-orange frontal tuft. The legs are light greyish-cream and the antennae are light brownish-cream.

== Distribution ==
Acalyptris laxibasis is endemic to Belize, where it is known from the Las Cuevas Biological Station in the Chiquibul Forest Reserve in the Cayo District.
