= Acalyptris latipennata =

Scientific classification
- Kingdom: Animalia
- Phylum: Arthropoda
- Clade: Pancrustacea
- Class: Insecta
- Order: Lepidoptera
- Family: Nepticulidae
- Genus: Acalyptris
- Species: A. latipennata

Binomial name
- Acalyptris latipennata (Puplesis & Robinson, 2000)

Species of moth

Acalyptris latipennata is a species of moth of the family Nepticulidae. Formally described by Rimantas Puplesis and Gaden S. Robinson in 2000, it is endemic to Belize. It is known from the Chiquibul Forest Reserve in the Cayo District. It is a small species, with males having a wingspan of 5.4–5.5 mm (0.21–0.22 in) and a forewing length of 2.4–2.5 mm (0.094–0.098 in).

== Taxonomy ==
Acalyptris latipennata was formally described in 2000 as Fomoria latipennata by Rimantas Puplesis and Gaden S. Robinson based on an adult male specimen collected from the Chiquibul Forest Reserve in the Cayo District of Belize. It is named after its split uncus. It was moved to the genus Acalyptris in 2002. It is part of the A. latipennata species group within the genus.

== Description ==
Acalyptris latipennata is a small species, with males having a wingspan of 5.4–5.5 mm (0.21–0.22 in) and a forewing length of 2.4–2.5 mm (0.094–0.098 in). The wide forewing is greyish towards the base while the distal half is greyish-brown. The cilia of the forewing are grey, while the undersurface is greyish-brown. The yellowish-brown hindwing is rather wide, with greyish-brown cilia. The thorax and tegulae are light to dark gray. The head has cream-colored palps and a yellowish-brown frontal tuft. The legs are cream-brown to greyish-brown and the antennae are greyish-brown. It is quite unique in the shape of its male genitalia.

== Distribution ==
Acalyptris latipennata is endemic to Belize, where it is known from the Las Cuevas Biological Station in the Chiquibul Forest Reserve in the Cayo District.
