= A. hispidus =

A. hispidus may refer to:

- Acalyptris hispidus, a species of moth in the family Nepticulidae found in Belize
- Acantholithodes hispidus, a species of hapalogastrid king crab
- Acromyrmex hispidus, a species of leaf-cutter ant in the subfamily Myrmicinae
- Amphelictus hispidus, a species of longhorn beetle in the family Cerambycidae found in Bolivia
- Antennarius hispidus, the shaggy frogfish, a species of marine ray-finned frogfish
- Aphilanthops hispidus, a species of wasp in the family Philanthidae
- Apsectus hispidus, a species of carpet beetle in the family Dermestidae
- Arothron hispidus, the white-spotted puffer, a species of pufferfish
- Arthraxon hispidus, small carpetgrass, a species of annual grass

== Synonyms ==
- Aster hispidus, a synonym of Solidago nemoralis, the gray goldenrod
