= Acalyptris dividua =

Scientific classification
- Kingdom: Animalia
- Phylum: Arthropoda
- Clade: Pancrustacea
- Class: Insecta
- Order: Lepidoptera
- Family: Nepticulidae
- Genus: Acalyptris
- Species: A. dividua

Binomial name
- Acalyptris dividua Puplesis & Robinson, 2000

Species of moth

Acalyptris dividua is a species of moth of the family Nepticulidae. Formally described by Rimantas Puplesis and Gaden S. Robinson in 2000, it is endemic to Belize. It is known from the Chiquibul Forest Reserve in the Cayo District. It is a small species, with males having a wingspan of 5.0–5.2 mm (0.20–0.20 in) and a forewing length of 2.2–2.3 mm (0.087–0.091 in).

== Taxonomy ==
Acalyptris dividua was formally described in 2000 by Rimantas Puplesis and Gaden S. Robinson based on an adult male specimen collected from the Chiquibul Forest Reserve in the Cayo District of Belize. It is named after its split uncus. It is part of the A. latipennata species group within the genus.

== Description ==
Acalyptris dividua is a small species, with males having a wingspan of 5.0–5.2 mm (0.20–0.20 in) and a forewing length of 2.2–2.3 mm (0.087–0.091 in). The forewing is yellowish-cream to yellow in color, with an wide oblique blackish line just proximal to the termen, reaching the cilia at the tornus. The cilia of the forewing are yellowish-cream, while the undersurface is cream-colored. The yellowish-cream hindwing is rather wide, with grayish cream-to-yellow cilia. The thorax and tegulae are yellowish or cream in color. The head has yellowish to cream-colored palps and a brownish-orange frontal tuft. The legs are yellowish and the antennae are yellow to light brownish-yellow. It is quite unique in many of its morphological features.

== Distribution ==
Acalyptris dividua is endemic to Belize, where it is known from the Las Cuevas Biological Station in the Chiquibul Forest Reserve in the Cayo District.
