= Acalyptris bovicorneus =

Scientific classification
- Kingdom: Animalia
- Phylum: Arthropoda
- Clade: Pancrustacea
- Class: Insecta
- Order: Lepidoptera
- Family: Nepticulidae
- Genus: Acalyptris
- Species: A. bovicorneus

Binomial name
- Acalyptris bovicorneus Puplesis & Robinson, 2000

Species of moth

Acalyptris bovicorneus is a species of moth of the family Nepticulidae. Formally described by Rimantas Puplesis and Gaden S. Robinson in 2000, it is endemic to Belize. It is known from the Chiquibul Forest Reserve and San Ignacio, both located within the Cayo District, and inhabits rainforests and secondary forests. It is a small species, with males having a wingspan of 5.4–5.8 mm (0.21–0.23 in) and a forewing length of 2.3–2.5 mm (0.091–0.098 in).

== Taxonomy ==
Acalyptris bovicorneus was formally described in 2000 by Rimantas Puplesis and Gaden S. Robinson based on an adult male specimen collected from the San Ignacio in the Cayo District of Belize. It is part of the A. bovicorneus species group within the genus.

== Description ==
Acalyptris bovicorneus is a small species, with males having a wingspan of 5.4–5.8 mm (0.21–0.23 in) and a forewing length of 2.3–2.5 mm (0.091–0.098 in). The forewing is grayish-cream, with finely speckled with brownish to blackish scales, or immaculate brownish-black. The cilia of the forewing are cream-colored, while the undersurface is dark brownish-gray. The grayish to brownish hindwing is lance-shaped, with grayish to cream cilia. The thorax and tegulae are grayish-brown, finely marked with paler speckles, or immaculate brownish-black. The head has cream-colored palps and a brownish-orange frontal tuft. The legs are cream-colored and the antennae are brown to brownish-gray. Females are broadly like males in their appearance. Although it has a fairly drab coloration, it can be distinguished by its very unique male genitalia.

== Distribution ==
Acalyptris bovicorneus is endemic to Belize, where it is known from the Chiquibul Forest Reserve and San Ignacio, both located within the Cayo District. It inhabits rainforests and secondary forests.
