= Acalyptris platygnathos =

Scientific classification
- Kingdom: Animalia
- Phylum: Arthropoda
- Clade: Pancrustacea
- Class: Insecta
- Order: Lepidoptera
- Family: Nepticulidae
- Genus: Acalyptris
- Species: A. platygnathos

Binomial name
- Acalyptris platygnathos Puplesis & Robinson, 2000

Species of moth

Acalyptris platygnathos is a species of moth of the family Nepticulidae. Formally described by Rimantas Puplesis and Gaden S. Robinson in 2000, it is endemic to Belize. It is known from the Chiquibul Forest Reserve in the Cayo District. It is a small species, with males having a wingspan of 3.9–4.0 mm (0.15–0.16 in) and a forewing length of 1.7 mm (0.067 in).

== Taxonomy ==
Acalyptris platygnathos was formally described in 2000 by Rimantas Puplesis and Gaden S. Robinson based on an adult male specimen collected from the Chiquibul Forest Reserve in the Cayo District of Belize. It is part of the A. fortis species group within the genus.

== Description ==
Acalyptris platygnathos is a small species, with males having a wingspan of 3.9–4.0 mm (0.15–0.16 in) and a forewing length of 1.7 mm (0.067 in). The forewing is greyish-cream, finely speckled greyish-brown, most prominently near the tip and medially. The cilia of the forewing are greyish-brown, with a similarly-colored undersurface. The grey, lance-shaped hindwing is somewhat broad, with similarly colored cilia. The thorax and tegulae are greyish-cream. The abdomen is brownish-cream to grey. The head has greyish-cream palps and a yellowish frontal tuft with a greyish wash. The legs are grey to greyish-cream and the antennae are greyish-brown. Although drab in appearance, the species has uniquely-shaped male genitalia.

== Distribution ==
Acalyptris platygnathos is endemic to Belize, where it is known from the Las Cuevas Biological Station in the Chiquibul Forest Reserve in the Cayo District.
