= Acalyptris bifidus =

Scientific classification
- Kingdom: Animalia
- Phylum: Arthropoda
- Clade: Pancrustacea
- Class: Insecta
- Order: Lepidoptera
- Family: Nepticulidae
- Genus: Acalyptris
- Species: A. bifidus

Binomial name
- Acalyptris bifidus Puplesis & Robinson, 2000

Species of moth

Acalyptris bifidus is a species of moth of the family Nepticulidae. Formally described by Rimantas Puplesis and Gaden S. Robinson in 2000, it is named after aspects of its very unique male genitalia. It has been recorded from Belize and Colombia, where it is known from Chiquibul Forest Reserve in the Cayo District and the municipality of Dagua in Valle del Cauca. It is a small species, with males having a wingspan of 4.3 mm (0.17 in) and a forewing length of 1.9 mm (0.075 in).

== Taxonomy ==
Acalyptris bifidus was formally described in 2000 by Rimantas Puplesis and Gaden S. Robinson based on an adult male specimen collected from the Chiquibul Forest Reserve in the Cayo District of Belize. The species is named after its pseuduncus processes and carinae, two unique and distinguishing features that separate it from others in its genus.

== Description ==
Acalyptris bifidus is a small species, with males having a wingspan of 4.3 mm (0.17 in) and a forewing length of 1.9 mm (0.075 in). The forewing is greyish-cream with finely speckled with brownish to blackish scales and a brownish undersurface. The cilia of the forewing are cream-colored with dusky scales. The gray hindwing is lance-shaped and rather slender, with similarly colored cilia. The thorax and tegulae are cream-colored, finely marked with grayish-brown speckles. There is a immaculate patch to the front of the thorax that has no grayish-brown scales. The head has cream-colored palps and a brownish-orange frontal tuft. Although it is broadly similar to other Acalyptris species in coloration, it can be distinguished by its very unique male genitalia.

== Distribution ==
Acalyptris bifidus is found in Central America and northern South America. It has been recorded from Belize and Colombia, where it is known from Chiquibul Forest Reserve and the municipality of Dagua in Valle del Cauca, respectively.
