= Acalyptris repeteki =

Scientific classification
- Kingdom: Animalia
- Phylum: Arthropoda
- Class: Insecta
- Order: Lepidoptera
- Family: Nepticulidae
- Genus: Acalyptris
- Species: A. repeteki

Binomial name
- Acalyptris repeteki (Puplesis, 1984)

Species of moth

Acalyptris repeteki is a species of moth of the family Nepticulidae. It was described by Puplesis in 1984. It is known from Turkmenistan and the United Arab Emirates.

The habitat consists of deserts.

The wingspan is 5.6 mm. Adults have been recorded in April and May.
