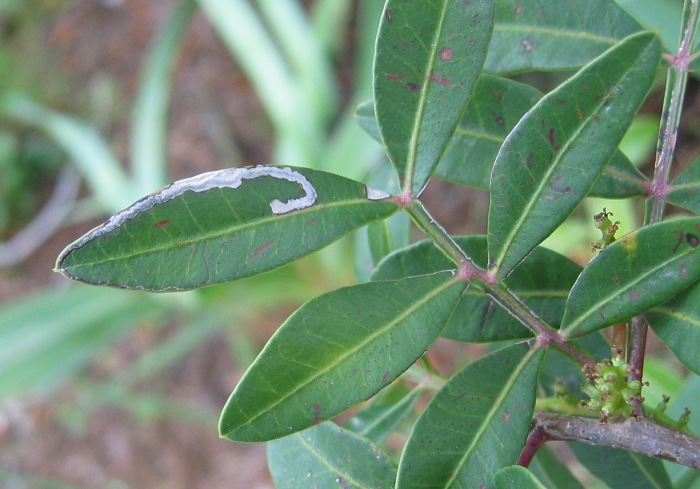

Scientific classification
- Kingdom: Animalia
- Phylum: Arthropoda
- Clade: Pancrustacea
- Class: Insecta
- Order: Lepidoptera
- Family: Nepticulidae
- Genus: Acalyptris
- Species: A. pistaciae

Binomial name
- Acalyptris pistaciae van Nieukerken & Hull, 2007

= Acalyptris pistaciae =

Species of moth

Acalyptris pistaciae is a moth of the family Nepticulidae. It is found in the eastern Mediterranean region, where it is widespread in Greece (mainland as well as the islands), Cyprus and Turkey. It is probably also present in Syria and Lebanon. Mines collected in Israel in 1931 and identified as Simplimorpha promissa may also belong to be this species.

The wingspan is 3.7-5.3 mm. There are two or more generations per year.

The larvae feed on Pistacia lentiscus and Pistacia terebinthus. They mine the leaves of their host plant.
