= Acalyptris distaleus =

Scientific classification
- Kingdom: Animalia
- Phylum: Arthropoda
- Clade: Pancrustacea
- Class: Insecta
- Order: Lepidoptera
- Family: Nepticulidae
- Genus: Acalyptris
- Species: A. distaleus

Binomial name
- Acalyptris distaleus (Wilkinson, 1979)

Species of moth

Acalyptris distaleus is a species of moth of the family Nepticulidae. It was described by Wilkinson in 1979. It is known from Arizona, United States.
