= Acalyptris paradividua =

Scientific classification
- Kingdom: Animalia
- Phylum: Arthropoda
- Clade: Pancrustacea
- Class: Insecta
- Order: Lepidoptera
- Family: Nepticulidae
- Genus: Acalyptris
- Species: A. paradividua

Binomial name
- Acalyptris paradividua Šimkevičiūtė & Stonis, 2009

Species of moth

Acalyptris paradividua is a species of moth of the family Nepticulidae. It is known only from the Pacific Coast of Mexico in the Oaxaca region.

The wingspan is about 5.5 mm. Adults are on wing from November to December. The habitat consists of secondary forests.
