= Acalyptris krugeri =

Scientific classification
- Kingdom: Animalia
- Phylum: Arthropoda
- Class: Insecta
- Order: Lepidoptera
- Family: Nepticulidae
- Genus: Acalyptris
- Species: A. krugeri

Binomial name
- Acalyptris krugeri (Vári, 1963)

Species of moth

Acalyptris krugeri is a species of moth of the family Nepticulidae. It was described by Vári in 1963. It is known from South Africa (it was described from Kruger National Park).

The larvae feed on Schotia brachypetala.
