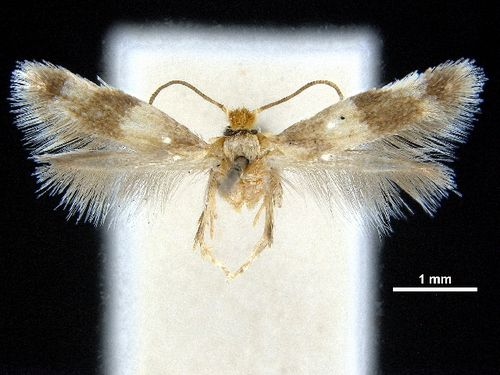

Scientific classification
- Kingdom: Animalia
- Phylum: Arthropoda
- Clade: Pancrustacea
- Class: Insecta
- Order: Lepidoptera
- Family: Nepticulidae
- Genus: Acalyptris
- Species: A. bipinnatellus

Binomial name
- Acalyptris bipinnatellus (Wilkinson, 1979)

= Acalyptris bipinnatellus =

Species of moth

Acalyptris bipinnatellus is a species of moth of the family Nepticulidae. It was first described by Wilkinson in 1979. It is known to be found in Florida, a state of the United States.
