= Acalyptris limonii =

Scientific classification
- Kingdom: Animalia
- Phylum: Arthropoda
- Class: Insecta
- Order: Lepidoptera
- Family: Nepticulidae
- Genus: Acalyptris
- Species: A. limonii

Binomial name
- Acalyptris limonii Z. & A. Laštůvka, 1998

Species of moth

Acalyptris limonii is a species of moth of the family Nepticulidae. It is found along the coasts of Adriatic, Ionian and Aegean Seas, where it has been recorded from Croatia and Greece.

The wingspan is 4.1-4.8 mm.

The larvae feed on Limonium vulgare. They mine the leaves of their host plant.
