= Acalyptris acontarcha =

Scientific classification
- Kingdom: Animalia
- Phylum: Arthropoda
- Class: Insecta
- Order: Lepidoptera
- Family: Nepticulidae
- Genus: Acalyptris
- Species: A. acontarcha

Binomial name
- Acalyptris acontarcha (Meyrick, 1926)

Species of moth

Acalyptris acontarcha is a species of moth of the family Nepticulidae. It was described by Edward Meyrick in 1926. It is known from Katwar, India. The hostplant for the species is Hymenodictyon obovatum.
