= Acalyptris gielisi =

Scientific classification
- Kingdom: Animalia
- Phylum: Arthropoda
- Clade: Pancrustacea
- Class: Insecta
- Order: Lepidoptera
- Family: Nepticulidae
- Genus: Acalyptris
- Species: A. gielisi

Binomial name
- Acalyptris gielisi van Nieukerken, 2010

Species of moth

Acalyptris gielisi is a species of moth of the family Nepticulidae. It was described by Erik J. van Nieukerken in 2010. It is known from the United Arab Emirates.

The wingspan is 4.2 mm for males and 4.5 mm for females. Adults have been recorded in April.
