= Acalyptris ecuadoriana =

Scientific classification
- Kingdom: Animalia
- Phylum: Arthropoda
- Class: Insecta
- Order: Lepidoptera
- Family: Nepticulidae
- Genus: Acalyptris
- Species: A. ecuadoriana

Binomial name
- Acalyptris ecuadoriana Puplesis & Diškus, 2002

Species of moth

Acalyptris ecuadoriana is a species of moth of the family Nepticulidae. It is found in the premontane Amazon rainforest in Ecuador.

The wingspan is 5.4–5.5 mm for males. Adults have been collected in January.
