= Acalyptris turcomanicus =

Scientific classification
- Kingdom: Animalia
- Phylum: Arthropoda
- Class: Insecta
- Order: Lepidoptera
- Family: Nepticulidae
- Genus: Acalyptris
- Species: A. turcomanicus

Binomial name
- Acalyptris turcomanicus (Puplesis, 1984)

Species of moth

Acalyptris turcomanicus is a moth of the family Nepticulidae. It was described by Puplesis in 1984. It is known from Turkmenistan.
