= Acalyptris hispidus =

Scientific classification
- Kingdom: Animalia
- Phylum: Arthropoda
- Clade: Pancrustacea
- Class: Insecta
- Order: Lepidoptera
- Family: Nepticulidae
- Genus: Acalyptris
- Species: A. hispidus

Binomial name
- Acalyptris hispidus Puplesis & Robinson, 2000

Species of moth

Acalyptris hispidus is a species of moth of the family Nepticulidae. Formally described by Rimantas Puplesis and Gaden S. Robinson in 2000, it is found in Ecuador and Belize. It has been recorded from the Chiquibul Forest Reserve in the Cayo District and Misahualli in the Oriente region. It is a small species, with males having a wingspan of 5.8 mm (0.23 in) and a forewing length of 2.6 mm (0.10 in).

== Taxonomy ==
Acalyptris hispidus was formally described in 2000 by Rimantas Puplesis and Gaden S. Robinson based on an adult male specimen collected from the Chiquibul Forest Reserve in the Cayo District of Belize. It is closely related to, but not part of, the A. murex species group within the genus.

== Description ==
Acalyptris hispidus is a small species, with males having a wingspan of 5.8 mm (0.23 in) and a forewing length of 2.6 mm (0.10 in). The forewing is cream-colored in color with some thinly-spread grayish-brown speckles and larger brownish-black patterns. The cilia of the forewing are gray, while the undersurface is grayish-brown. The hindwing is gray. The thorax and tegulae are gray in color. The head has brownish-cream to cream-colored palps and a brownish-orange frontal tuft. The legs are cream-colored and the antennae are yellowish-brown. It can be distinguished from other species by the shape of its gnathos and valva, in the male genitalia.

== Distribution ==
Acalyptris hispidus is found in Central America and northern South America. It has been recorded from Belize and Ecuador, where it is known from the Chiquibul Forest Reserve and Misahualli in the Oriente region, respectively.
