= Acalyptris yucatani =

Scientific classification
- Kingdom: Animalia
- Phylum: Arthropoda
- Clade: Pancrustacea
- Class: Insecta
- Order: Lepidoptera
- Family: Nepticulidae
- Genus: Acalyptris
- Species: A. yucatani

Binomial name
- Acalyptris yucatani Stonis, Remeikis, Diskus & Noreika, 2013

Species of moth

Acalyptris yucatani is a species of moth of the family Nepticulidae. It is found on the Yucatán Peninsula.

The larvae feed on Schinus species. They mine the leaves of their host plant.
