= Acalyptris maritima =

Scientific classification
- Kingdom: Animalia
- Phylum: Arthropoda
- Class: Insecta
- Order: Lepidoptera
- Family: Nepticulidae
- Genus: Acalyptris
- Species: A. maritima

Binomial name
- Acalyptris maritima A. & Z. Laštůvka, 1997

Species of moth

Acalyptris maritima is a species of moth of the family Nepticulidae. It is found along the coasts of Adriatic, Ionian and Aegean Seas, where it has been recorded from Croatia, Greece and Italy.

The wingspan is 4.5-5.5 mm.

The larvae feed on Limonium vulgare. They mine the leaves of their host plant.
