= Acalyptris pyrenaica =

Scientific classification
- Kingdom: Animalia
- Phylum: Arthropoda
- Class: Insecta
- Order: Lepidoptera
- Family: Nepticulidae
- Genus: Acalyptris
- Species: A. pyrenaica

Binomial name
- Acalyptris pyrenaica A. & Z. Laštůvka, 1993

Species of moth

Acalyptris pyrenaica is a moth of the family Nepticulidae. It is only known from the Pyrenees in Spain and the Eifel region in Germany.

The wingspan is 4–5.6 mm.

The immature stages are unknown, but adults were caught by sweeping grassland vegetation from May to July.
