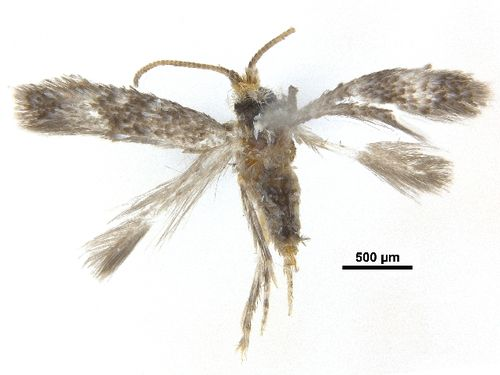

Scientific classification
- Kingdom: Animalia
- Phylum: Arthropoda
- Class: Insecta
- Order: Lepidoptera
- Family: Nepticulidae
- Genus: Acalyptris
- Species: A. bicornutus

Binomial name
- Acalyptris bicornutus (Davis, 1978)

Synonyms
- Microcalyptris bicornutus Davis, 1978

= Acalyptris bicornutus =

Species of moth

Acalyptris bicornutus is a species of moth of the family Nepticulidae. It is found in the Florida Keys.

The length of the forewings is 1.5–1.7 mm. Adults have been collected from late September to late November.
