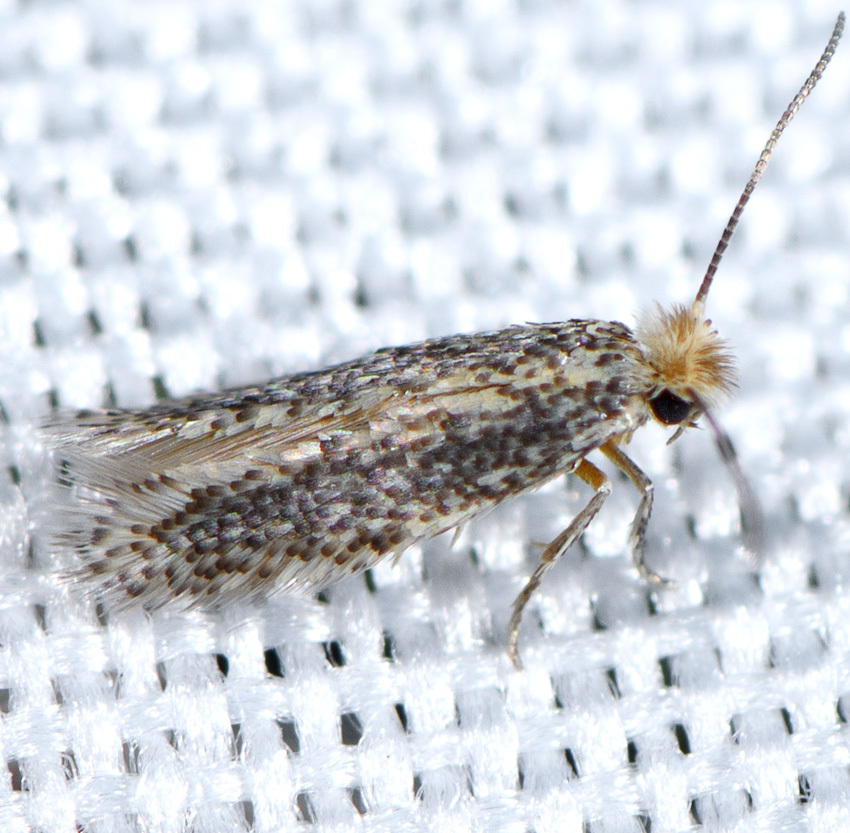

Scientific classification
- Kingdom: Animalia
- Phylum: Arthropoda
- Class: Insecta
- Order: Lepidoptera
- Family: Nepticulidae
- Genus: Acalyptris
- Species: A. lotella

Binomial name
- Acalyptris lotella (Wagner, 1987) Diškus et al., 2003

Synonyms
- Microcalyptris lotella Wagner, 1987

= Acalyptris lotella =

Species of moth

Acalyptris lotella is a species of moth in the family Nepticulidae found in California, United States.

The larvae mine the stems of Lotus scoparius.
