= Acalyptris argyraspis =

Scientific classification
- Kingdom: Animalia
- Phylum: Arthropoda
- Class: Insecta
- Order: Lepidoptera
- Family: Nepticulidae
- Genus: Acalyptris
- Species: A. argyraspis

Binomial name
- Acalyptris argyraspis Puplesis & Diskus, 1995

Species of moth

Acalyptris argyraspis is a species of moth of the family Nepticulidae. It was described by Puplesis and Diskus in 1995. It is known from Tajikistan.
