= Acalyptris insolentis =

Scientific classification
- Kingdom: Animalia
- Phylum: Arthropoda
- Class: Insecta
- Order: Lepidoptera
- Family: Nepticulidae
- Genus: Acalyptris
- Species: A. insolentis

Binomial name
- Acalyptris insolentis Puplesis & Diškus, 2002

Species of moth

Acalyptris insolentis is a species of moth of the Nepticulidae family. It is found in premontane and lowland Amazon rainforest in Ecuador.

The wingspan is 3.8-4.5 mm for males.
