= Acalyptris desertellus =

Scientific classification
- Kingdom: Animalia
- Phylum: Arthropoda
- Class: Insecta
- Order: Lepidoptera
- Family: Nepticulidae
- Genus: Acalyptris
- Species: A. desertellus

Binomial name
- Acalyptris desertellus (Puplesis, 1984)

Species of moth

Acalyptris desertellus is a species of moth of the old family Nepticulidae. It was described by Puplesis in 1984. It is known from Turkmenistan and Uzbekistan.
