= Acalyptris clinomochla =

Scientific classification
- Kingdom: Animalia
- Phylum: Arthropoda
- Class: Insecta
- Order: Lepidoptera
- Family: Nepticulidae
- Genus: Acalyptris
- Species: A. clinomochla

Binomial name
- Acalyptris clinomochla (Meyrick, 1934)

Species of moth

Acalyptris clinomochla is a species of moth of the family Nepticulidae. It was described by Edward Meyrick in 1934. It is known from Bombay, India and Sri Lanka. The hostplant for the species is Bridelia retusa.
