= Acalyptris amazonius =

Scientific classification
- Kingdom: Animalia
- Phylum: Arthropoda
- Class: Insecta
- Order: Lepidoptera
- Family: Nepticulidae
- Genus: Acalyptris
- Species: A. amazonius

Binomial name
- Acalyptris amazonius Puplesis & Diškus, 2002

Species of moth

Acalyptris amazonius is a species of moth of the family Nepticulidae. It is found in lowland Amazon rainforest in Ecuador.

The wingspan is 3.4-3.5 mm for males and about 3.7 mm for females. Adults have been collected in January.
