= Acalyptris vannieukerkeni =

Scientific classification
- Kingdom: Animalia
- Phylum: Arthropoda
- Class: Insecta
- Order: Lepidoptera
- Family: Nepticulidae
- Genus: Acalyptris
- Species: A. vannieukerkeni

Binomial name
- Acalyptris vannieukerkeni Puplesis, 1994

Species of moth

Acalyptris vannieukerkeni is a moth of the family Nepticulidae. It was described by Puplesis in 1994. It is known from Turkmenistan.
