= Acalyptris onorei =

Scientific classification
- Kingdom: Animalia
- Phylum: Arthropoda
- Clade: Pancrustacea
- Class: Insecta
- Order: Lepidoptera
- Family: Nepticulidae
- Genus: Acalyptris
- Species: A. onorei

Binomial name
- Acalyptris onorei Puplesis & Diškus, 2002

Species of moth

Acalyptris onorei is a moth of the family Nepticulidae. It is found in the lowland Amazon rainforest in Ecuador.

The wingspan is 4.5-4.9 mm for males. Adults have been collected in January.
