= Acalyptris lascuevella =

Scientific classification
- Kingdom: Animalia
- Phylum: Arthropoda
- Class: Insecta
- Order: Lepidoptera
- Family: Nepticulidae
- Genus: Acalyptris
- Species: A. lascuevella

Binomial name
- Acalyptris lascuevella Puplesis & Robinson, 2000

Species of moth

Acalyptris lascuevella is a species of moth of the family Nepticulidae. It is probably widely distributed in subtropical and tropical regions of Central America. Currently, it is known from Belize (Maya Mountains: Las Cuevas) and Mexico (the Pacific Coast in the Oaxaca region). The habitat consists of secondary and tropical forests.

The wingspan is about 3.4 mm. Adults are on wing from November to December in Mexico and in April in Belize.
