= Acalyptris pseudohastatus =

Scientific classification
- Kingdom: Animalia
- Phylum: Arthropoda
- Class: Insecta
- Order: Lepidoptera
- Family: Nepticulidae
- Genus: Acalyptris
- Species: A. pseudohastatus

Binomial name
- Acalyptris pseudohastatus Puplesis & Diškus, 2002

Species of moth

Acalyptris pseudohastatus is a moth of the family Nepticulidae. It was described by Puplesis and Diškus in 2002. It is known from premontane rainforest in the Napo region of Ecuador.
