= Acalyptris psammophricta =

Scientific classification
- Kingdom: Animalia
- Phylum: Arthropoda
- Class: Insecta
- Order: Lepidoptera
- Family: Nepticulidae
- Genus: Acalyptris
- Species: A. psammophricta

Binomial name
- Acalyptris psammophricta Meyrick, 1921

Synonyms
- Acalyptris lvovskyi (Puplesis, 1984)

Species of moth

Acalyptris psammophricta is a species of moth of the family Nepticulidae. It was described by Edward Meyrick in 1921. It is found from India westwards to Tunisia and northwards to Mongolia, including Pakistan, Iran, the United Arab Emirates, Israel and Libya.

The habitat consists of deserts and coastal dunes.

The wingspan 4.9–6.9 mm for males and 5.1–6.4 mm for females. Adults are on wing from February to May in the Middle East and North Africa, from May to June and August to September in central Asia and in October in India.
