= Acalyptris brevis =

Scientific classification
- Kingdom: Animalia
- Phylum: Arthropoda
- Class: Insecta
- Order: Lepidoptera
- Family: Nepticulidae
- Genus: Acalyptris
- Species: A. brevis

Binomial name
- Acalyptris brevis Puplesis, 1990

Species of moth

Acalyptris brevis is a species of moth of the family Nepticulidae. It was described by Puplesis in 1990. It is known from Turkmenistan.
