= Aphilanthops subfrigidus =

Scientific classification
- Domain: Eukaryota
- Kingdom: Animalia
- Phylum: Arthropoda
- Class: Insecta
- Order: Hymenoptera
- Family: Philanthidae
- Tribe: Aphilanthopini
- Genus: Aphilanthops
- Species: A. subfrigidus

Binomial name
- Aphilanthops subfrigidus Dunning, 1898

Synonyms
- Aphilanthops elsiae Dunning, 1898

Species of wasp

Aphilanthops subfrigidus is a species of wasp in the family Philanthidae. It is found in North America.
