= Acalyptris tenuijuxtus =

Scientific classification
- Kingdom: Animalia
- Phylum: Arthropoda
- Class: Insecta
- Order: Lepidoptera
- Family: Nepticulidae
- Genus: Acalyptris
- Species: A. tenuijuxtus

Binomial name
- Acalyptris tenuijuxtus (Davis, 1978)

Synonyms
- Microcalyptris tenuijuxtus Davis, 1978

Species of moth

Acalyptris tenuijuxtus is a moth of the family Nepticulidae. It is found in the Florida Keys of the United States.

The length of the forewings is 1.4–1.6 mm. Adults have been collected from early October to late November.
