= Acalyptris galinae =

Scientific classification
- Kingdom: Animalia
- Phylum: Arthropoda
- Class: Insecta
- Order: Lepidoptera
- Family: Nepticulidae
- Genus: Acalyptris
- Species: A. galinae

Binomial name
- Acalyptris galinae (Puplesis, 1984)

Species of moth

Acalyptris galinae is a moth of the family Nepticulidae. It was described by Puplesis in 1984. It is known from Turkmenistan and Uzbekistan, as well as Mongolia and the United Arab Emirates.

Its habitat consists of deserts.

The wingspan 4.4–5.5 mm. Adults are on wing from April to June.
