= Acalyptris rotundus =

Scientific classification
- Kingdom: Animalia
- Phylum: Arthropoda
- Class: Insecta
- Order: Lepidoptera
- Family: Nepticulidae
- Genus: Acalyptris
- Species: A. rotundus

Binomial name
- Acalyptris rotundus Puplesis & Diškus, 2002

Species of moth

Acalyptris rotundus is a moth of the family Nepticulidae. It is found in the Amazon premontane rainforest in Ecuador.

The wingspan is 4.3–4.4 mm for males. Adults have been collected in late January.
