= Acalyptris kizilkumi =

Scientific classification
- Kingdom: Animalia
- Phylum: Arthropoda
- Class: Insecta
- Order: Lepidoptera
- Family: Nepticulidae
- Genus: Acalyptris
- Species: A. kizilkumi

Binomial name
- Acalyptris kizilkumi Falkovitsh, 1986

Species of moth

Acalyptris kizilkumi is a species of moth of the family Nepticulidae. It was described by Mark I. Falkovitsh in 1986. It is known from Turkmenistan and Uzbekistan.
