= Aphilanthops frigidus =

Scientific classification
- Domain: Eukaryota
- Kingdom: Animalia
- Phylum: Arthropoda
- Class: Insecta
- Order: Hymenoptera
- Family: Philanthidae
- Tribe: Aphilanthopini
- Genus: Aphilanthops
- Species: A. frigidus

Binomial name
- Aphilanthops frigidus (F. Smith, 1856)

Synonyms
- Aphilanthops bakeri Dunning, 1896; Nomada dawsoni Swenk, 1912; Philanthus frigidus F. Smith, 1856

Species of wasp

Aphilanthops frigidus is a species of wasp in the family Philanthidae found in North America.
