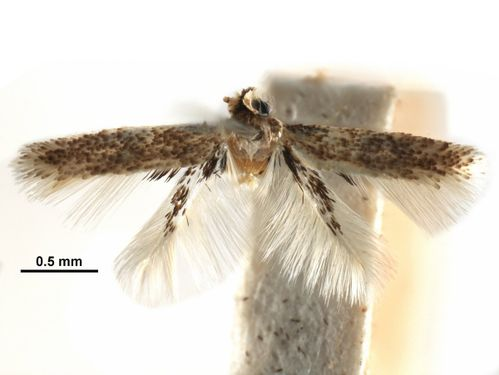

Scientific classification
- Kingdom: Animalia
- Phylum: Arthropoda
- Clade: Pancrustacea
- Class: Insecta
- Order: Lepidoptera
- Family: Nepticulidae
- Genus: Acalyptris
- Species: A. postalatratus

Binomial name
- Acalyptris postalatratus (Wilkinson, 1979)

= Acalyptris postalatratus =

Species of moth

Acalyptris postalatratus is a species of moth of the family Nepticulidae. It was described by Wilkinson in 1979. It is known to inhabit the state of Arizona.
