= Acalyptris staticis =

Scientific classification
- Kingdom: Animalia
- Phylum: Arthropoda
- Clade: Pancrustacea
- Class: Insecta
- Order: Lepidoptera
- Family: Nepticulidae
- Genus: Acalyptris
- Species: A. staticis

Binomial name
- Acalyptris staticis (Walsingham, 1908)

Synonyms
- Stigmella staticis Walsingham, 1908

Species of moth

Acalyptris staticis is a species of moth of the family Nepticulidae. It is only known from the coast of Tenerife, but might also be present on the other Canary Islands and Morocco.

The wingspan is 4–5 mm.

The larvae feed on Limonium pectinatum. They mine the leaves of their host plant.
