= Acalyptris limoniastri =

Scientific classification
- Kingdom: Animalia
- Phylum: Arthropoda
- Clade: Pancrustacea
- Class: Insecta
- Order: Lepidoptera
- Family: Nepticulidae
- Genus: Acalyptris
- Species: A. limoniastri

Binomial name
- Acalyptris limoniastri van Nieukerken & Hull, 2007

Species of moth

Acalyptris limoniastri is a species of moth of the family Nepticulidae. It is only known from the northern borders of the Sahara in Algeria and Tunisia.

The wingspan is 5.5–6.6 mm.

The immature stages are unknown. The species was collected in 1904 from bushes of Limoniastrum guyonianum, they are also found on Limoniastrum monopetalum.
