= Acalyptris melanospila =

Scientific classification
- Kingdom: Animalia
- Phylum: Arthropoda
- Class: Insecta
- Order: Lepidoptera
- Family: Nepticulidae
- Genus: Acalyptris
- Species: A. melanospila

Binomial name
- Acalyptris melanospila (Meyrick, 1934)

Species of moth

Acalyptris melanospila is a species of moth of the family Nepticulidae. It was described by Edward Meyrick in 1934. It is known from Bombay, India. The hostplant for the species is Randia dumetorum.
