= Varius =

Varius (Latin for "knock-kneed" and "different") may refer to:

- Members of the gens Varia, including
  - Lucius Varius Rufus (c. 74 – 14 BC), Roman poet
  - Lucius Varius Ambibulus (fl. c. 133), Roman politician
  - Sextus Varius Marcellus (c. 165 – c. 215), Syro-Roman politician
  - Sextus Varius Avitus Bassianus (c. 204 – 222), birth name of the Roman emperor Elagabalus
- Varius, a genus of moths belonging to the small family Nepticulidae
- Varius Manx, a Polish pop group
- XKO Varius, a web content management system

== See also ==
- The Little Varius
- Various (disambiguation)
