= Acalyptris punctulata =

- Mine

Scientific classification
- Kingdom: Animalia
- Phylum: Arthropoda
- Clade: Pancrustacea
- Class: Insecta
- Order: Lepidoptera
- Family: Nepticulidae
- Genus: Acalyptris
- Species: A. punctulata

Binomial name
- Acalyptris punctulata (Braun, 1910)

Synonyms
- Nepticula punctulata Braun, 1910; Microcalyptris punctulata (Braun, 1910)

Species of moth

Acalyptris punctulata is a moth of the family Nepticulidae. It is endemic to California (USA).

The wingspan is 4.5–5.5 mm (0.18–0.22 in). The larvae feed on Ceanothus cuneatus and Rhamnus californica. They mine the leaves of their host plant.
