= Acalyptris heteranthes =

Scientific classification
- Kingdom: Animalia
- Phylum: Arthropoda
- Class: Insecta
- Order: Lepidoptera
- Family: Nepticulidae
- Genus: Acalyptris
- Species: A. heteranthes

Binomial name
- Acalyptris heteranthes (Meyrick, 1926)

Species of moth

Acalyptris heteranthes is a species of moth of the family Nepticulidae. It was described by Edward Meyrick in 1926. It is known from Karwar, India.
