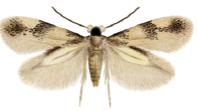

Scientific classification
- Kingdom: Animalia
- Phylum: Arthropoda
- Class: Insecta
- Order: Lepidoptera
- Family: Nepticulidae
- Genus: Acalyptris
- Species: A. platani

Binomial name
- Acalyptris platani (Müller-Rutz, 1934)

Synonyms
- Weberia platani Müller-Rutz, 1934; Niepeltia platani; Trifurcula platani

= Acalyptris platani =

Species of moth

Acalyptris platani is a moth of the family Nepticulidae. It is widespread in southern Europe and western Asia, from Portugal to Iran. It has spread westwards from its original occurrence in the Balkans before 1930, and has since been found in western France and Switzerland. It has also been recorded from Menorca, Bulgaria, Cyprus and Turkey.

The wingspan is 5–5.4 mm. Adults are on wing from in May and June and again in July and August. There are probably two generations per year.

The larvae feed on Platanus × hispanica and Platanus orientalis. They mine the leaves of their host plant.
