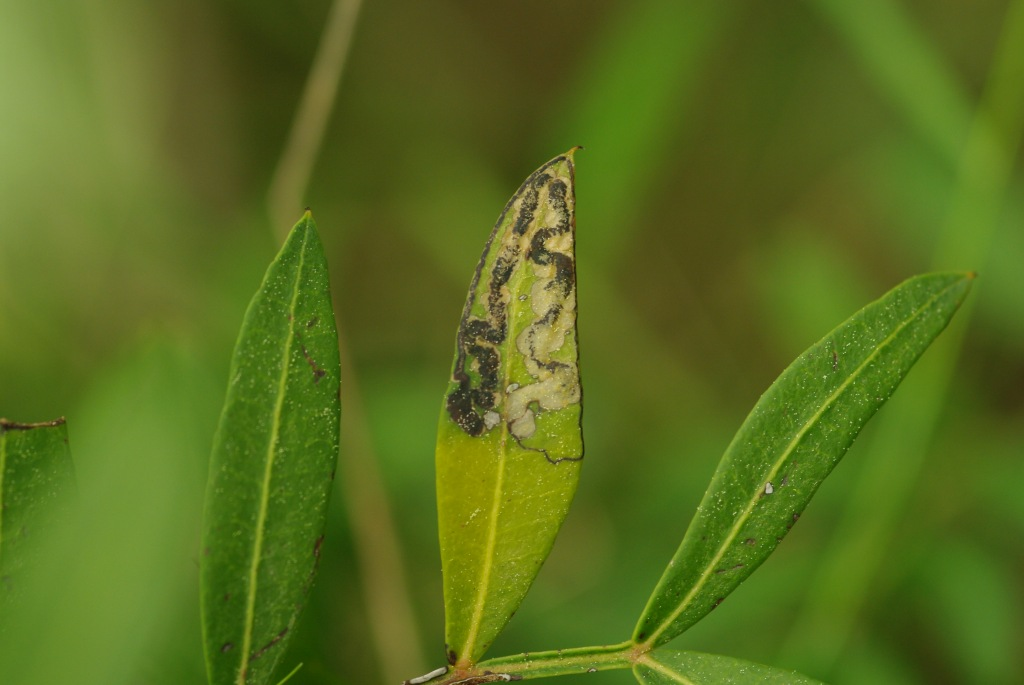

Scientific classification
- Kingdom: Animalia
- Phylum: Arthropoda
- Class: Insecta
- Order: Lepidoptera
- Family: Nepticulidae
- Genus: Acalyptris
- Species: A. minimella

Binomial name
- Acalyptris minimella (Rebel, 1926)

Synonyms
- Trifurcula minimella Rebel, 1926; Nepticula minimella; Niepeltia minimella; Weberina lentiscella Groschke, 1944; Niepeltia lentiscella

= Acalyptris minimella =

Species of moth

Acalyptris minimella is a species of moth of the family Nepticulidae. It is widespread and common in the western Mediterranean region, usually not far from the sea. It has been recorded from Portugal, Spain, France, Italy, Croatia, Ibiza, Mallorca, Corsica, Sardinia and Sicily. It is also present in North Africa, where it has been recorded from Morocco, Algeria and Tunisia.

The wingspan is 4.1-5.8 mm. There are two or more generations per year.

The larvae feed on Pistacia lentiscus and Pistacia terebinthus. They mine the leaves of their host plant.
