= Acalyptris articulosus =

Scientific classification
- Kingdom: Animalia
- Phylum: Arthropoda
- Class: Insecta
- Order: Lepidoptera
- Family: Nepticulidae
- Genus: Acalyptris
- Species: A. articulosus

Binomial name
- Acalyptris articulosus Puplesis & Diškus, 2002

Species of moth

Acalyptris articulosus is a species of moth of the family Nepticulidae. It is found in the Amazon premontane rainforest in Ecuador.

The wingspan is 4.3–4.5 mm for males. Adults have been collected in late January.
