= Acalyptris loranthella =

Scientific classification
- Kingdom: Animalia
- Phylum: Arthropoda
- Clade: Pancrustacea
- Class: Insecta
- Order: Lepidoptera
- Family: Nepticulidae
- Genus: Acalyptris
- Species: A. loranthella

Binomial name
- Acalyptris loranthella (Klimesch, 1937)

Synonyms
- Nepticula loranthella Klimesch, 1937; Stigmella loranthella; Weberina loranthella; Niepeltia loranthella

Species of moth

Acalyptris loranthella is a species of moth of the family Nepticulidae. It is found in south-eastern Europe. It has been recorded from the Czech Republic, Slovakia, eastern Austria, Hungary, Italy, Sicily, Romania and Greece. It is probably also present throughout the Balkan Peninsula and in Turkey.

The wingspan is 3.7–5.5 mm.

The larvae feed on Loranthus europaeus. They mine the leaves of their host plant.
