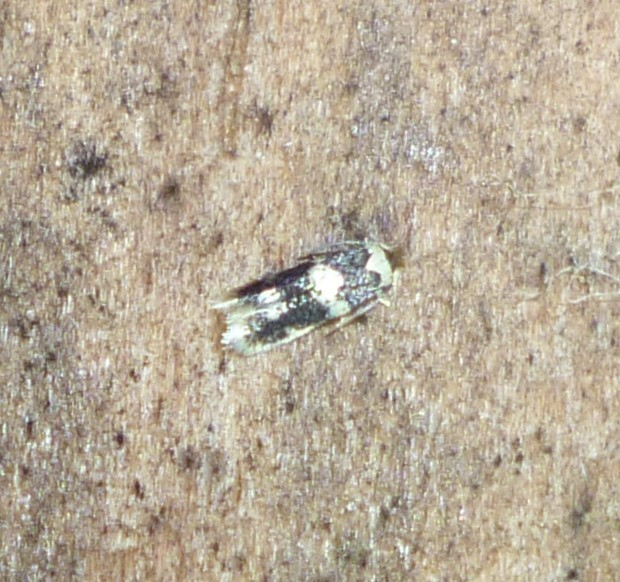

Scientific classification
- Kingdom: Animalia
- Phylum: Arthropoda
- Clade: Pancrustacea
- Class: Insecta
- Order: Lepidoptera
- Family: Nepticulidae
- Genus: Acalyptris
- Species: A. thoracealbella

Binomial name
- Acalyptris thoracealbella (Chambers, 1873)

Synonyms
- Nepticula thoracealbella Chambers, 1873; Nepticula badiocapitella Chambers, 1876

= Acalyptris thoracealbella =

Species of moth

Acalyptris thoracealbella is a moth of the family Nepticulidae. It is found in Kentucky, Ohio and Pennsylvania in the United States.

Adults have been recorded in May and July, suggesting at least two generations.
