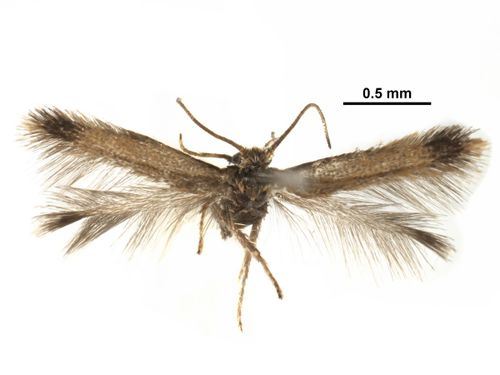

Scientific classification
- Kingdom: Animalia
- Phylum: Arthropoda
- Class: Insecta
- Order: Lepidoptera
- Family: Nepticulidae
- Genus: Acalyptris
- Species: A. scirpi

Binomial name
- Acalyptris scirpi (Braun, 1925)

Synonyms
- Microcalyptris scirpi Davis, 1978

= Acalyptris scirpi =

Species of moth

Acalyptris scirpi is a species of moth of the family Nepticulidae. It is found in Utah, United States.

The larvae feed on Scirpus paludosus. They mine the leaves of their host plant.
