= Acalyptris nigripexus =

Scientific classification
- Kingdom: Animalia
- Phylum: Arthropoda
- Class: Insecta
- Order: Lepidoptera
- Family: Nepticulidae
- Genus: Acalyptris
- Species: A. nigripexus

Binomial name
- Acalyptris nigripexus Puplesis & Diškus, 2003

Species of moth

Acalyptris nigripexus is a moth of the family Nepticulidae. It was described by Puplesis and Diškus in 2003. It is known from the tropical montane forest of Nepal.
