= Acalyptris basihastatus =

Scientific classification
- Kingdom: Animalia
- Phylum: Arthropoda
- Class: Insecta
- Order: Lepidoptera
- Family: Nepticulidae
- Genus: Acalyptris
- Species: A. basihastatus

Binomial name
- Acalyptris basihastatus Puplesis & Diškus, 2002

Species of moth

Acalyptris basihastatus is a species of moth of the family Nepticulidae. It is found in the Amazon premontane rainforest in Ecuador.

The wingspan is 4.3–4.6 mm for males. Adults have been collected in late January.
