= Stigmella fluida =

Scientific classification
- Kingdom: Animalia
- Phylum: Arthropoda
- Class: Insecta
- Order: Lepidoptera
- Family: Nepticulidae
- Genus: Stigmella
- Species: S. fluida

Binomial name
- Stigmella fluida (Meyrick, 1911)

Species of moth

Stigmella fluida is a moth of the family Nepticulidae. It was described by Edward Meyrick in 1911. It is found in South Africa (it was described from Transvaal).
