= Stigmella abachausi =

Scientific classification
- Kingdom: Animalia
- Phylum: Arthropoda
- Class: Insecta
- Order: Lepidoptera
- Family: Nepticulidae
- Genus: Stigmella
- Species: S. abachausi

Binomial name
- Stigmella abachausi (Janse, 1948)

Species of moth

Stigmella abachausi is a moth of the family Nepticulidae. It was described by Anthonie Johannes Theodorus Janse in 1948 and is endemic to Namibia.
