= Acalyptris fagarivora =

Scientific classification
- Kingdom: Animalia
- Phylum: Arthropoda
- Class: Insecta
- Order: Lepidoptera
- Family: Nepticulidae
- Genus: Acalyptris
- Species: A. fagarivora

Binomial name
- Acalyptris fagarivora (Vári, 1955)

Synonyms
- Stigmella fagarivora; Niepeltia fagarivora

Species of moth

Acalyptris fagarivora is a species of moth of the family Nepticulidae. It was described by Vári in 1955. It is known from South Africa (It was described from Pretoria).
