= Stigmella varii =

Scientific classification
- Kingdom: Animalia
- Phylum: Arthropoda
- Clade: Pancrustacea
- Class: Insecta
- Order: Lepidoptera
- Family: Nepticulidae
- Genus: Stigmella
- Species: S. varii

Binomial name
- Stigmella varii Scoble, 1978

Species of moth

Stigmella varii is a moth of the family Nepticulidae. It was described by Scoble in 1978. It is found in South Africa (it was described from the Brits District Hartebeespoortdam in Transvaal).

The larvae feed on Croton gratissimus. They probably mine the leaves of their host plant.
