= Acalyptris lanneivora =

Scientific classification
- Kingdom: Animalia
- Phylum: Arthropoda
- Class: Insecta
- Order: Lepidoptera
- Family: Nepticulidae
- Genus: Acalyptris
- Species: A. lanneivora

Binomial name
- Acalyptris lanneivora (Vári, 1955)

Species of moth

Acalyptris lanneivora is a species of moth of the family Nepticulidae. It was described by Vári in 1955. It is known from South Africa (it was described from Pretoria).

The larvae feed on Lanea discolor.
