= Stigmella irrorata =

Scientific classification
- Kingdom: Animalia
- Phylum: Arthropoda
- Class: Insecta
- Order: Lepidoptera
- Family: Nepticulidae
- Genus: Stigmella
- Species: S. irrorata

Binomial name
- Stigmella irrorata (Janse, 1948)

Species of moth

Stigmella irrorata is a moth of the family Nepticulidae. It was first described by Anthonie Johannes Theodorus Janse in 1948. It is found in Namibia.
