= Stigmella krugeri =

Scientific classification
- Kingdom: Animalia
- Phylum: Arthropoda
- Class: Insecta
- Order: Lepidoptera
- Family: Nepticulidae
- Genus: Stigmella
- Species: S. krugeri

Binomial name
- Stigmella krugeri Vári, 1963

Synonyms
- Stigmella kruegeri

Species of moth

Stigmella krugeri is a moth of the family Nepticulidae. It was described by Vári in 1963. It is found in South Africa.

The larvae feed on Schotia brachypetala.
