= Stigmella nigrata =

Scientific classification
- Kingdom: Animalia
- Phylum: Arthropoda
- Class: Insecta
- Order: Lepidoptera
- Family: Nepticulidae
- Genus: Stigmella
- Species: S. nigrata

Binomial name
- Stigmella nigrata (Meyrick, 1913)

Species of moth

Stigmella nigrata is a moth of the family Nepticulidae. It was described by Edward Meyrick in 1913. It is found in South Africa (it was described from the Waterval Onder in what is now Mpumalanga).

The larvae feed on Ziziphus mucronatus. They probably mine the leaves of their host plant.
