= Stigmella triumfettica =

Scientific classification
- Kingdom: Animalia
- Phylum: Arthropoda
- Clade: Pancrustacea
- Class: Insecta
- Order: Lepidoptera
- Family: Nepticulidae
- Genus: Stigmella
- Species: S. triumfettica

Binomial name
- Stigmella triumfettica Scoble, 1978

Species of moth

Stigmella triumfettica is a moth of the family Nepticulidae. It was described by Scoble in 1978. It is found in South Africa (it was described from the Pretoria District in Transvaal).

The larvae feed on Triumfetta species. They probably mine the leaves of their host plant.
