= Acalyptris obliquella =

Scientific classification
- Kingdom: Animalia
- Phylum: Arthropoda
- Clade: Pancrustacea
- Class: Insecta
- Order: Lepidoptera
- Family: Nepticulidae
- Genus: Acalyptris
- Species: A. obliquella

Binomial name
- Acalyptris obliquella (Scoble, 1980)

Species of moth

Acalyptris obliquella is a species of moth of the family Nepticulidae. It was described by Scoble in 1980. It is known from South Africa (it was described from Natal).

The larvae feed on Bridelia micrantha.
