= Stigmella abutilonica =

Scientific classification
- Kingdom: Animalia
- Phylum: Arthropoda
- Clade: Pancrustacea
- Class: Insecta
- Order: Lepidoptera
- Family: Nepticulidae
- Genus: Stigmella
- Species: S. abutilonica

Binomial name
- Stigmella abutilonica Scoble, 1978

Species of moth

Stigmella abutilonica is a moth of the family Nepticulidae. It was described by Scoble in 1978. It is found in South Africa (it was described from the Umhlanga Rocks in Natal).

The larvae feed on Abutilon grantii. They probably mine the leaves of their host plant.
