= Stigmella urbica =

Scientific classification
- Kingdom: Animalia
- Phylum: Arthropoda
- Class: Insecta
- Order: Lepidoptera
- Family: Nepticulidae
- Genus: Stigmella
- Species: S. urbica

Binomial name
- Stigmella urbica (Meyrick, 1913)

Species of moth

Stigmella urbica is a moth of the family Nepticulidae. It was described by Edward Meyrick in 1913. It is found in South Africa (it was described from Barberton, Mpumalanga).
