= Stigmella generalis =

Scientific classification
- Kingdom: Animalia
- Phylum: Arthropoda
- Clade: Pancrustacea
- Class: Insecta
- Order: Lepidoptera
- Family: Nepticulidae
- Genus: Stigmella
- Species: S. generalis

Binomial name
- Stigmella generalis Scoble, 1978

Species of moth

Stigmella generalis is a moth of the family Nepticulidae. It was described by Scoble in 1978. It is found in South Africa (it was described from the Cape Province).

The larvae feed on Rhus species. They probably mine the leaves of their host plant.
