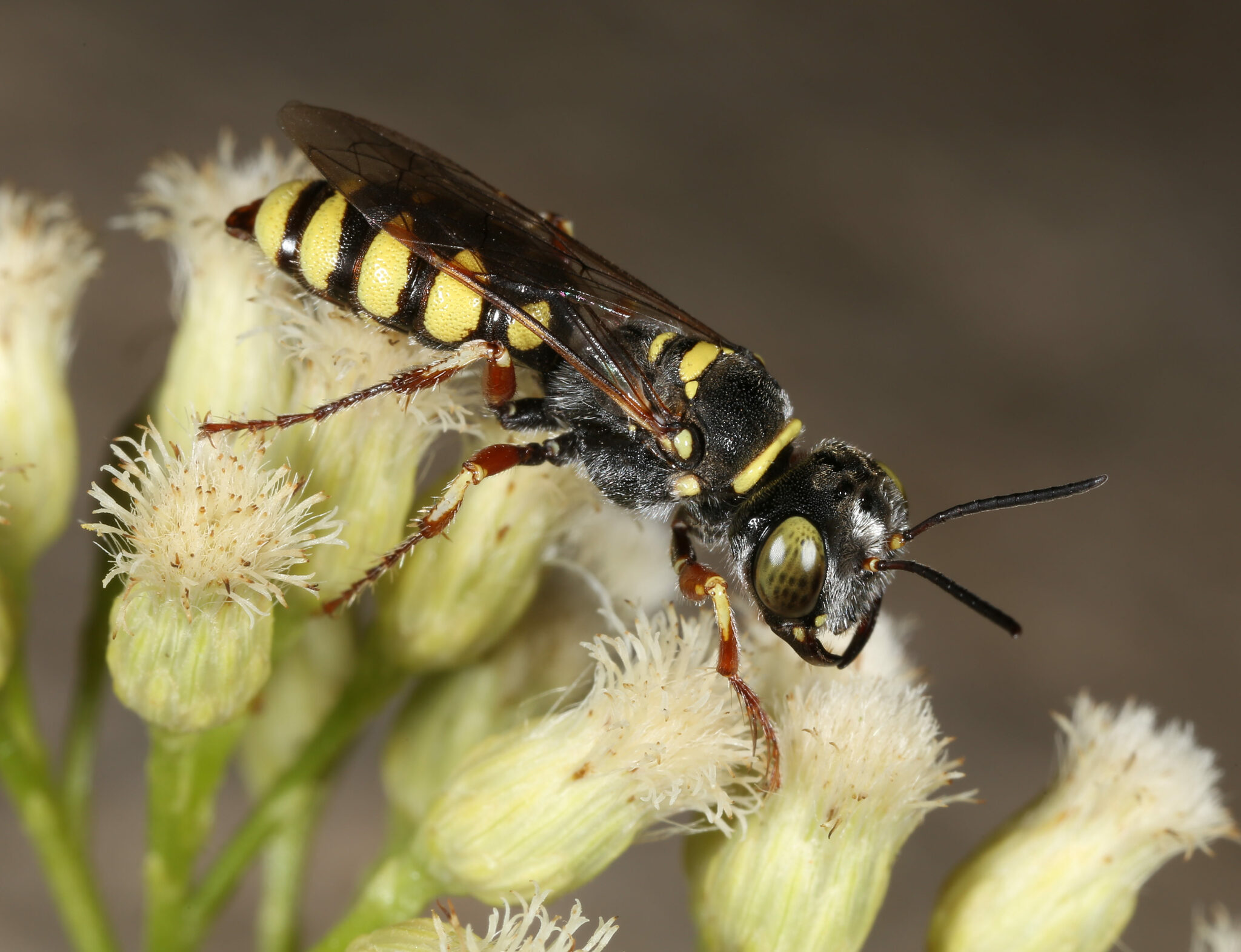
- Clypeadon taurulus

Scientific classification
- Domain: Eukaryota
- Kingdom: Animalia
- Phylum: Arthropoda
- Class: Insecta
- Order: Hymenoptera
- Family: Philanthidae
- Tribe: Aphilanthopini
- Genus: Clypeadon; Patton, 1897

= Clypeadon =

Genus of wasps

Clypeadon is a genus of wasps belonging to the family Philanthidae.

The species of this genus are found in North America.

== Species ==
- Clypeadon bechteli (R.Bohart, 1959)
- Clypeadon californicus (R.Bohart, 1959)
- Clypeadon dreisbachi (R.Bohart, 1959)
- Clypeadon evansi (R.Bohart, 1966)
- Clypeadon haigi (R.Bohart, 1959)
- Clypeadon laticinctus (Cresson, 1865)
- Clypeadon sculleni (R.Bohart, 1959)
- Clypeadon taurulus (Cockerell, 1895)
- Clypeadon utahensis (Baker, 1895)
