= Stigmella platyzona =

Scientific classification
- Kingdom: Animalia
- Phylum: Arthropoda
- Class: Insecta
- Order: Lepidoptera
- Family: Nepticulidae
- Genus: Stigmella
- Species: S. platyzona

Binomial name
- Stigmella platyzona Vári, 1963

Species of moth

Stigmella platyzona is a moth of the family Nepticulidae. It was described by Vári in 1963. It is found in South Africa (it was described from the Cape Province).

The larvae feed on Ficus burttdavyi. They probably mine the leaves of their host plant.
