= Stigmella panconista =

Scientific classification
- Kingdom: Animalia
- Phylum: Arthropoda
- Class: Insecta
- Order: Lepidoptera
- Family: Nepticulidae
- Genus: Stigmella
- Species: S. panconista

Binomial name
- Stigmella panconista (Meyrick, 1920)

Species of moth

Stigmella panconista is a moth of the family Nepticulidae. It was described by Edward Meyrick in 1920. It is found in South Africa (it was described from Cape Town).
