= Acalyptris lorantivora =

Scientific classification
- Kingdom: Animalia
- Phylum: Arthropoda
- Class: Insecta
- Order: Lepidoptera
- Family: Nepticulidae
- Genus: Acalyptris
- Species: A. lorantivora

Binomial name
- Acalyptris lorantivora (Janse, 1948)

Species of moth

Acalyptris lorantivora is a species of moth of the family Nepticulidae. It was described by Anthonie Johannes Theodorus Janse in 1948. It is known from South Africa (it was described from the Cape Province).

The larvae feed on Boscia oleoides.
