= Stigmella rhynchosiella =

Scientific classification
- Kingdom: Animalia
- Phylum: Arthropoda
- Class: Insecta
- Order: Lepidoptera
- Family: Nepticulidae
- Genus: Stigmella
- Species: S. rhynchosiella

Binomial name
- Stigmella rhynchosiella Vári, 1955

Species of moth

Stigmella rhynchosiella is a moth of the family Nepticulidae. It was described by Vári in 1955. It is found in South Africa (it was described from Pretoria).

The larvae feed on Rhynchosia nitens. They probably mine the leaves of their host plant.
