= Stigmella hortorum =

Scientific classification
- Kingdom: Animalia
- Phylum: Arthropoda
- Clade: Pancrustacea
- Class: Insecta
- Order: Lepidoptera
- Family: Nepticulidae
- Genus: Stigmella
- Species: S. hortorum

Binomial name
- Stigmella hortorum Scoble, 1978

Species of moth

Stigmella hortorum is a moth of the family Nepticulidae. It was described by Scoble in 1978. It is found in South Africa (it was described from the Kruger National Park in Transvaal).
