= Stigmella grewiae =

Scientific classification
- Kingdom: Animalia
- Phylum: Arthropoda
- Clade: Pancrustacea
- Class: Insecta
- Order: Lepidoptera
- Family: Nepticulidae
- Genus: Stigmella
- Species: S. grewiae

Binomial name
- Stigmella grewiae Scoble, 1978

Species of moth

Stigmella grewiae is a moth of the family Nepticulidae. It was described by Scoble in 1978. It is found in South Africa (it was described from Balgowan in Natal).

The larvae feed on Grewia occidentalis. They probably mine the leaves of their host plant.
