= Acalyptris vepricola =

Scientific classification
- Kingdom: Animalia
- Phylum: Arthropoda
- Class: Insecta
- Order: Lepidoptera
- Family: Nepticulidae
- Genus: Acalyptris
- Species: A. vepricola

Binomial name
- Acalyptris vepricola (Vári, 1963)

Species of moth

Acalyptris vepricola is a species of moth of the family Nepticulidae. It was described by Vári in 1963. It is known from South Africa (it was described from the Innanda District).

The larvae feed on Vepris undulata.
