= Stigmella worcesteri =

Scientific classification
- Kingdom: Animalia
- Phylum: Arthropoda
- Clade: Pancrustacea
- Class: Insecta
- Order: Lepidoptera
- Family: Nepticulidae
- Genus: Stigmella
- Species: S. worcesteri

Binomial name
- Stigmella worcesteri Scoble, 1983

Synonyms
- Stigmella pallida Scoble nec Braun

Species of moth

Stigmella worcesteri is a moth of the family Nepticulidae. It was described by Scoble in 1983. It is found in South Africa (it was described from the Cape Province).
