= Acalyptris fulva =

Scientific classification
- Kingdom: Animalia
- Phylum: Arthropoda
- Clade: Pancrustacea
- Class: Insecta
- Order: Lepidoptera
- Family: Nepticulidae
- Genus: Acalyptris
- Species: A. fulva

Binomial name
- Acalyptris fulva (Scoble, 1980)

Species of moth

Acalyptris fulva is a species of moth of the family Nepticulidae. It was described by Scoble in 1980. It is known from South Africa (It was described from the Kruger National Park).
