= Acalyptris mariepsensis =

Scientific classification
- Kingdom: Animalia
- Phylum: Arthropoda
- Clade: Pancrustacea
- Class: Insecta
- Order: Lepidoptera
- Family: Nepticulidae
- Genus: Acalyptris
- Species: A. mariepsensis

Binomial name
- Acalyptris mariepsensis (Scoble, 1980)

Species of moth

Acalyptris mariepsensis is a species of moth of the family Nepticulidae. It was described by Scoble in 1980. It is known from South Africa (it was described from the Mariepskop).

The larvae feed on Cassipourea gerrardi.
