= Stigmella galactacma =

Scientific classification
- Kingdom: Animalia
- Phylum: Arthropoda
- Class: Insecta
- Order: Lepidoptera
- Family: Nepticulidae
- Genus: Stigmella
- Species: S. galactacma

Binomial name
- Stigmella galactacma (Meyrick, 1924)

Species of moth

Stigmella galactacma is a moth of the family Nepticulidae. The genus was erected by Franz von Paula Schrank in 1802. It was described by Edward Meyrick in 1924. It is found in South Africa (it was described from Weenen in Natal, now KwaZulu-Natal).
