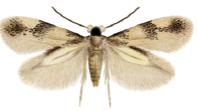
- Acalyptris platani

Scientific classification
- Kingdom: Animalia
- Phylum: Arthropoda
- Class: Insecta
- Order: Lepidoptera
- Family: Nepticulidae
- Subfamily: Nepticulinae
- Genus: Acalyptris; Meyrick, 1921

Synonyms
- Microcalyptris Braun, 1925; Niepeltia Strand, 1934; Weberia Müller-Rutz, 1934 (junior homonym of Weberia Robineau-Desvoidy, 1830); Weberina Müller-Rutz, 1934 (replacement name for Weberia)

= Acalyptris =

Genus of moths

Acalyptris is a genus of moths of the family Nepticulidae.

== Species ==
- Acalyptris acontarcha (Meyrick, 1926)
- Acalyptris acumenta (Scoble, 1980)
- Acalyptris amazonius Puplesis & Diškus, 2002
- Acalyptris arenosus (Falkovitsh, 1986)
- Acalyptris argyraspis Puplesis & Diškus, 1995
- Acalyptris articulosus Puplesis & Diškus, 2002
- Acalyptris auratilis Puplesis & Diškus, 2003
- Acalyptris basihastatus Puplesis & Diškus, 2002
- Acalyptris bicornutus (Davis, 1978)
- Acalyptris bifidus Puplesis & Robinson, 2000
- Acalyptris bipinnatellus (Wilkinson, 1979)
- Acalyptris bispinata (Scoble, 1980)
- Acalyptris bovicorneus Puplesis & Robinson, 2000
- Acalyptris brevis Puplesis, 1990
- Acalyptris clinomochla (Meyrick, 1934)
- Acalyptris combretella (Vári, 1955)
- Acalyptris desertellus (Puplesis, 1984)
- Acalyptris distaleus (Wilkinson, 1979)
- Acalyptris dividua Puplesis & Robinson, 2000
- Acalyptris ecuadoriana Puplesis & Diškus, 2002
- Acalyptris egidijui Puplesis, 1990
- Acalyptris falkovitshi (Puplesis, 1984)
- Acalyptris fagarivora (Vári, 1955)
- Acalyptris fortis Puplesis & Robinson, 2000
- Acalyptris fulva (Scoble, 1980)
- Acalyptris fuscofascia (Scoble, 1980)
- Acalyptris galinae (Puplesis, 1984)
- Acalyptris gielisi Van Nieukerken, 2010
- Acalyptris heteranthes (Meyrick, 1926)
- Acalyptris hispidus Puplesis & Robinson, 2000
- Acalyptris insolentis Puplesis & Diškus, 2002
- Acalyptris kizilkumi (Falkovitsh, 1986)
- Acalyptris krooni (Scoble, 1980)
- Acalyptris krugeri (Vári, 1963)
- Acalyptris lanneivora (Vári, 1955)
- Acalyptris lascuevella Puplesis & Robinson, 2000
- Acalyptris latipennata (Puplesis & Robinson, 2000)
- Acalyptris laxibasis Puplesis & Robinson, 2000
- Acalyptris lesbia van Nieukerken & Hull, 2007
- Acalyptris limoniastri van Nieukerken & Hull, 2007
- Acalyptris limonii Z. & A. Laštůvka, 1998
- Acalyptris loranthella (Klimesch, 1937)
- Acalyptris lorantivora (Janse, 1948)
- Acalyptris lotella Wagner, 1987
- Acalyptris lundiensis (Scoble, 1980)
- Acalyptris lvovskyi (Puplesis, 1984)
- Acalyptris mariepsensis (Scoble, 1980)
- Acalyptris maritima A. & Z. Laštůvka, 1997
- Acalyptris martinheringi Puplesis & Robinson, 2000
- Acalyptris melanospila (Meyrick, 1934)
- Acalyptris minimella (Rebel, 1924)
- Acalyptris molleivora (Scoble, 1980)
- Acalyptris nigripexus Puplesis & Diškus, 2003
- Acalyptris novenarius Puplesis & Robinson, 2000
- Acalyptris obliquella (Scoble, 1980)
- Acalyptris onorei Puplesis & Diškus, 2002
- Acalyptris pallens (Puplesis, 1984)
- Acalyptris paradividua Šimkevičiūtė & Stonis, 2009
- Acalyptris piculus Puplesis, 1990
- Acalyptris pistaciae van Nieukerken & Hull, 2007
- Acalyptris platani (Müller-Rutz, 1934)
- Acalyptris platygnathos Puplesis & Robinson, 2000
- Acalyptris postalatratus (Wilkinson, 1979)
- Acalyptris psammophricta Meyrick, 1921
- Acalyptris pseudohastatus Puplesis & Diškus, 2002
- Acalyptris punctulata (Braun, 1910)
- Acalyptris pundaensis (Scoble, 1980)
- Acalyptris pyrenaica A. & Z. Laštůvka, 1993
- Acalyptris repeteki (Puplesis, 1984)
- Acalyptris rotundus Puplesis & Diškus, 2002
- Acalyptris rubiaevora (Scoble, 1980)
- Acalyptris scirpi (Braun, 1925)
- Acalyptris sellata (Scoble, 1980)
- Acalyptris shafirkanus (Puplesis, 1984)
- Acalyptris staticis (Walsingham, 1908)
- Acalyptris tenuijuxtus (Davis, 1978)
- Acalyptris terrificus Šimkevičiūtė & Stonis, 2009
- Acalyptris thoracealbella (Chambers, 1873)
- Acalyptris trifidus Puplesis & Robinson, 2000
- Acalyptris turcomanicus (Puplesis, 1984)
- Acalyptris umdoniensis (Scoble, 1980)
- Acalyptris unicornis Puplesis & Robinson, 2000
- Acalyptris vacuolata (Scoble, 1980)
- Acalyptris vannieukerkeni Puplesis, 1994
- Acalyptris vepricola (Vári, 1963)
- Acalyptris vittatus (Puplesis, 1984)
- Acalyptris vumbaensis (Scoble, 1980)
- Acalyptris yucatani Stonis, Remeikis, Diskus & Noreika, 2013
- Acalyptris zeyheriae (Scoble, 1980)
