= Stigmella geranica =

Scientific classification
- Kingdom: Animalia
- Phylum: Arthropoda
- Clade: Pancrustacea
- Class: Insecta
- Order: Lepidoptera
- Family: Nepticulidae
- Genus: Stigmella
- Species: S. geranica

Binomial name
- Stigmella geranica Scoble, 1978

Species of moth

Stigmella geranica is a moth of the family Nepticulidae. It was described by Scoble in 1978. It is found in South Africa (it was described from Natal).

The larvae feed on Geranium cf pulchrum species. They probably mine the leaves of their host plant.
