= Stigmella confinalis =

Scientific classification
- Kingdom: Animalia
- Phylum: Arthropoda
- Clade: Pancrustacea
- Class: Insecta
- Order: Lepidoptera
- Family: Nepticulidae
- Genus: Stigmella
- Species: S. confinalis

Binomial name
- Stigmella confinalis Scoble, 1978

Species of moth

Stigmella confinalis is a moth of the family Nepticulidae. It was described by Scoble in 1978. It is found in Zimbabwe.

The larvae feed on Dombeya species. They probably mine the leaves of their host plant.
