= Stigmella celtifoliella =

Scientific classification
- Kingdom: Animalia
- Phylum: Arthropoda
- Class: Insecta
- Order: Lepidoptera
- Family: Nepticulidae
- Genus: Stigmella
- Species: S. celtifoliella

Binomial name
- Stigmella celtifoliella Vári, 1955

Species of moth

Stigmella celtifoliella is a moth of the family Nepticulidae. It was described by Vári in 1955. It is found in South Africa (it was described from Transvaal, Pretoria and the Zoutpansberg).

Adults are on wing in January and April.

The larvae feed on Celtis africana. They probably mine the leaves of their host.
