= Acalyptris combretella =

Scientific classification
- Kingdom: Animalia
- Phylum: Arthropoda
- Class: Insecta
- Order: Lepidoptera
- Family: Nepticulidae
- Genus: Acalyptris
- Species: A. combretella

Binomial name
- Acalyptris combretella (Vári, 1955)

Synonyms
- Niepeltia combretella Vári, 1955

Species of moth

Acalyptris combretella is a species of moth of the family Nepticulidae. It was described by Vári in 1955. It is known from South Africa (it was described from Pretoria in Transvaal).

The larvae feed on Combretum apiculatum.
