= Stigmella crotonica =

Scientific classification
- Kingdom: Animalia
- Phylum: Arthropoda
- Clade: Pancrustacea
- Class: Insecta
- Order: Lepidoptera
- Family: Nepticulidae
- Genus: Stigmella
- Species: S. crotonica

Binomial name
- Stigmella crotonica Scoble, 1978

Species of moth

Stigmella crotonica is a moth of the family Nepticulidae. It was described by Scoble in 1978. It is found in Zimbabwe (it was described from Mount Selinda).

The larvae feed on Croton sylvaticus. They probably mine the leaves of their host plant.
