= Stigmella parinarella =

Scientific classification
- Kingdom: Animalia
- Phylum: Arthropoda
- Class: Insecta
- Order: Lepidoptera
- Family: Nepticulidae
- Genus: Stigmella
- Species: S. parinarella

Binomial name
- Stigmella parinarella Vari, 1955

Species of moth

Stigmella parinarella is a moth of the family Nepticulidae. It was described by Vari in 1955. It is found in South Africa (it was described from Pretoria).

The larvae feed on Parinari capense. They probably mine the leaves of their host plant.
