= Stigmella charistis =

Scientific classification
- Kingdom: Animalia
- Phylum: Arthropoda
- Class: Insecta
- Order: Lepidoptera
- Family: Nepticulidae
- Genus: Stigmella
- Species: S. charistis

Binomial name
- Stigmella charistis Vari, 1963

Species of moth

Stigmella charistis is a moth of the family Nepticulidae. It was described by Vari in 1963. It is found in South Africa (it was described from the Umhlanga Rocks in Natal).

The larvae feed on Grewia occidentalis. They probably mine the leaves of their host plant.
