= Aphilanthops hispidus =

Scientific classification
- Domain: Eukaryota
- Kingdom: Animalia
- Phylum: Arthropoda
- Class: Insecta
- Order: Hymenoptera
- Family: Philanthidae
- Tribe: Aphilanthopini
- Genus: Aphilanthops
- Species: A. hispidus

Binomial name
- Aphilanthops hispidus W. Fox, 1894

Species of wasp

Aphilanthops hispidus is a species of wasp in the family Philanthidae. It is found in Central America and North America.
