= Acalyptris zeyheriae =

Scientific classification
- Kingdom: Animalia
- Phylum: Arthropoda
- Clade: Pancrustacea
- Class: Insecta
- Order: Lepidoptera
- Family: Nepticulidae
- Genus: Acalyptris
- Species: A. zeyheriae

Binomial name
- Acalyptris zeyheriae (Scoble, 1980)

Species of moth

Acalyptris zeyheriae is a species of moth of the family Nepticulidae. It was described by Scoble in 1980. It is known from South Africa (it was described from Transvaal).

The larvae feed on Combretum zeyheri.
