= Stigmella porphyreuta =

Scientific classification
- Kingdom: Animalia
- Phylum: Arthropoda
- Class: Insecta
- Order: Lepidoptera
- Family: Nepticulidae
- Genus: Stigmella
- Species: S. porphyreuta

Binomial name
- Stigmella porphyreuta (Meyrick, 1917)

Species of moth

Stigmella porphyreuta is a moth of the family Nepticulidae. It was described by Edward Meyrick in 1917 and is endemic to Natal, South Africa.
