= Stigmella dombeyivora =

Scientific classification
- Kingdom: Animalia
- Phylum: Arthropoda
- Clade: Pancrustacea
- Class: Insecta
- Order: Lepidoptera
- Family: Nepticulidae
- Genus: Stigmella
- Species: S. dombeyivora

Binomial name
- Stigmella dombeyivora Scoble, 1978

Species of moth

Stigmella dombeyivora is a moth of the family Nepticulidae. It was described by Scoble in 1978. It is found in Zimbabwe (it was described from Umtali).

The larvae feed on Dombeya species. They probably mine the leaves of their host plant.
