= Various =

Various may refer to:

- Various (band), an English dubstep/electronic music duo
- Various artists, a term for a compilation album containing pieces by various musicians
- Various authors, a book containing works by several writers
- The Various, a children's fantasy novel by Steve Augarde

== See also ==
- Various & Gould, a Berlin-based artist duo
- Various Artists – Archives Vol. 4, an album by Steve Vai
- Various Failures, a compilation album by American experimental rock band Swans
- The Various Haunts of Men, a novel by Susan Hill
- Various Positions, an album by Leonard Cohen
  - Various Positions Tour
- Various Positions (film), a 2002 film directed by Ori Kowarsky
- Varius (disambiguation)
