= Aphilanthops =

Scientific classification
- Domain: Eukaryota
- Kingdom: Animalia
- Phylum: Arthropoda
- Class: Insecta
- Order: Hymenoptera
- Family: Philanthidae
- Tribe: Aphilanthopini
- Genus: Aphilanthops; Patton, 1881

Genus of wasps

Aphilanthops is a genus of ant queen-kidnapping wasps in the family Philanthidae. At least four species in Aphilanthops are described.

== Species ==
These four species belong to the genus Aphilanthops:

- A. foxi Dunning, 1898
- A. frigidus (F. Smith, 1856)
- A. hispidus W. Fox, 1894
- A. subfrigidus Dunning, 1898
