= Acalyptris krooni =

Scientific classification
- Kingdom: Animalia
- Phylum: Arthropoda
- Clade: Pancrustacea
- Class: Insecta
- Order: Lepidoptera
- Family: Nepticulidae
- Genus: Acalyptris
- Species: A. krooni

Binomial name
- Acalyptris krooni (Scoble, 1980)

Species of moth

Acalyptris krooni is a species of moth of the family Nepticulidae. It was described by Scoble in 1980. It is known from South Africa (it was described from the Soutpansberg District).
