= Stigmella tragilis =

Scientific classification
- Kingdom: Animalia
- Phylum: Arthropoda
- Clade: Pancrustacea
- Class: Insecta
- Order: Lepidoptera
- Family: Nepticulidae
- Genus: Stigmella
- Species: S. tragilis

Binomial name
- Stigmella tragilis Scoble, 1978

Species of moth

Stigmella tragilis is a moth of the family Nepticulidae. It was described by Scoble in 1978. It is found in South Africa (it was described from Margate in Natal).

The larvae feed on Tragia durbanensis. They probably mine the leaves of their host plant.
