= Acalyptris rubiaevora =

Scientific classification
- Kingdom: Animalia
- Phylum: Arthropoda
- Clade: Pancrustacea
- Class: Insecta
- Order: Lepidoptera
- Family: Nepticulidae
- Genus: Acalyptris
- Species: A. rubiaevora

Binomial name
- Acalyptris rubiaevora (Scoble, 1980)

Species of moth

Acalyptris rubiaevora is a species of moth of the family Nepticulidae. It was described by Scoble in 1980. It is known from South Africa (it was described from Pretoria).

The larvae feed on Canthium inerme.
