= Stigmella caliginosa =

Scientific classification
- Kingdom: Animalia
- Phylum: Arthropoda
- Class: Insecta
- Order: Lepidoptera
- Family: Nepticulidae
- Genus: Stigmella
- Species: S. caliginosa

Binomial name
- Stigmella caliginosa (Meyrick, 1921)

Species of moth

Stigmella caliginosa is a moth of the family Nepticulidae. It was described by Edward Meyrick in 1921. It is found in South Africa.
