= Stigmella perplexa =

Scientific classification
- Kingdom: Animalia
- Phylum: Arthropoda
- Class: Insecta
- Order: Lepidoptera
- Family: Nepticulidae
- Genus: Stigmella
- Species: S. perplexa

Binomial name
- Stigmella perplexa (Janse, 1948)

Species of moth

Stigmella perplexa is a moth of the genus Stigmella and the family Nepticulidae. It was described by Anthonie Johannes Theodorus Janse in 1948. This species of moth is found in Namibia.
