= Stigmella liota =

Scientific classification
- Kingdom: Animalia
- Phylum: Arthropoda
- Class: Insecta
- Order: Lepidoptera
- Family: Nepticulidae
- Genus: Stigmella
- Species: S. liota

Binomial name
- Stigmella liota Vari, 1963

Species of moth

Stigmella liota is a moth of the family Nepticulidae. It was described by Vari in 1963. It is found in South Africa (it was described from the Soutpansberg District in Transvaal).
