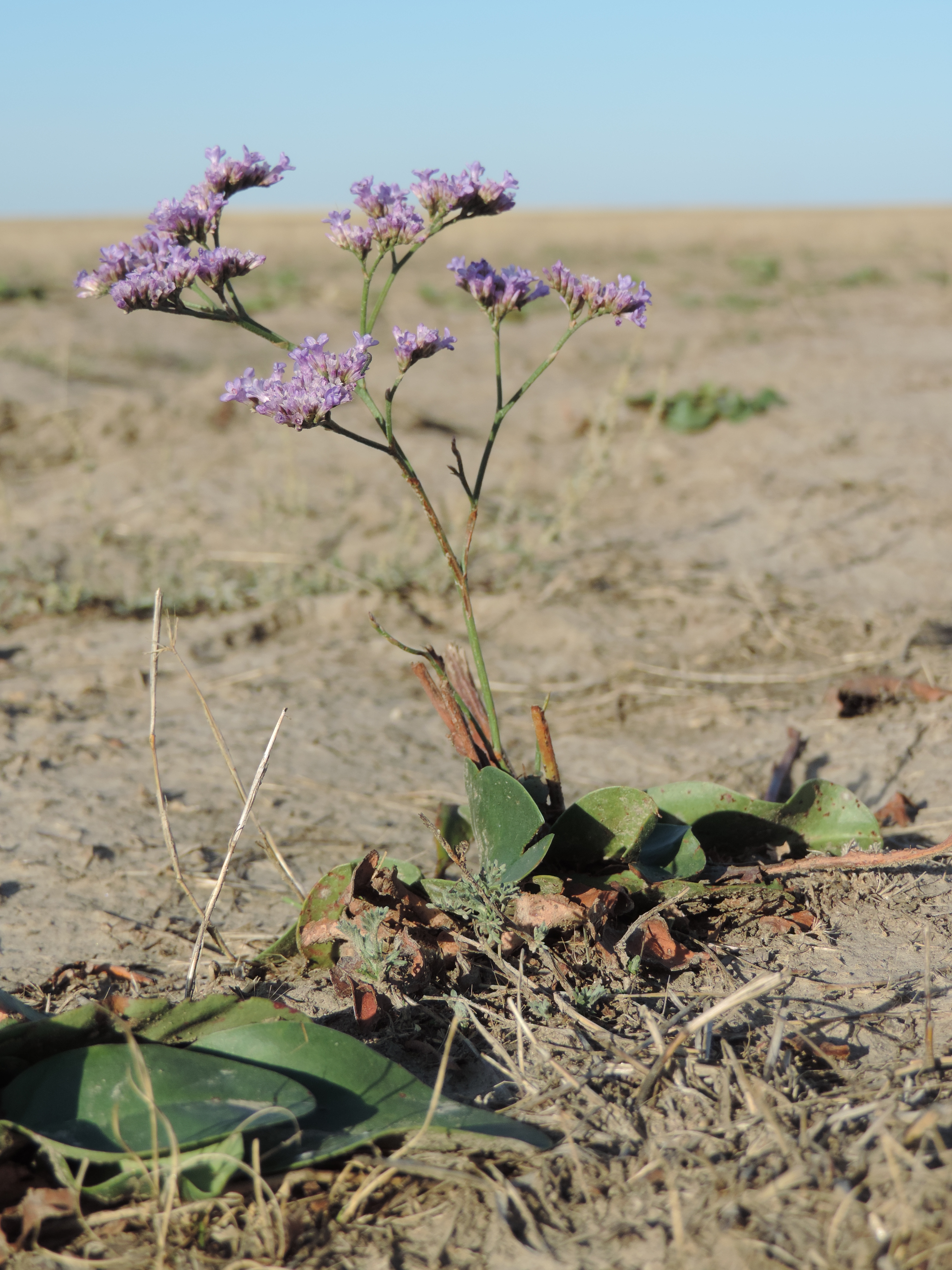
- Habit
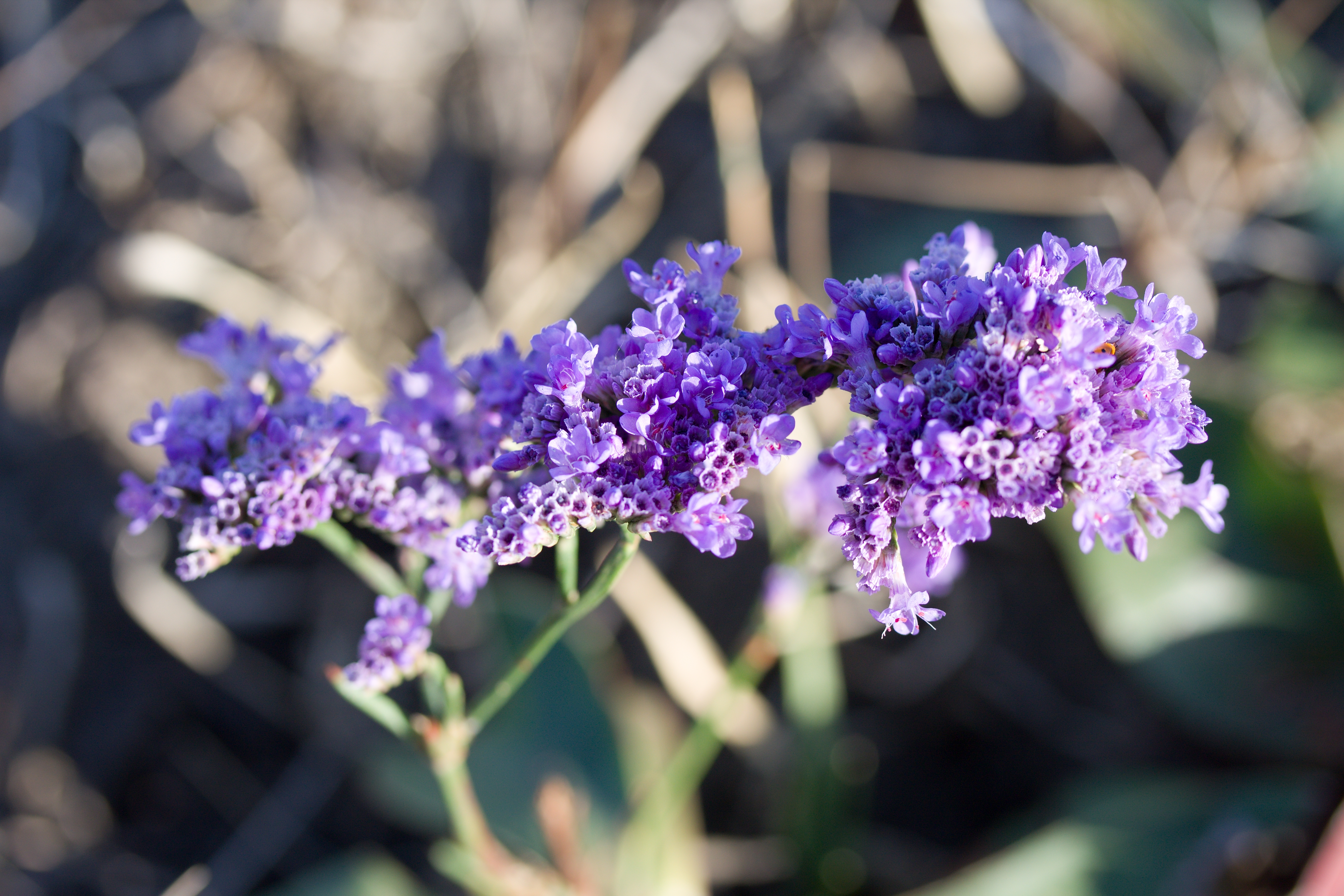
- Close-up of flowers

Scientific classification
- Kingdom: Plantae
- Clade: Tracheophytes
- Clade: Angiosperms
- Clade: Eudicots
- Order: Caryophyllales
- Family: Plumbaginaceae
- Genus: Limonium
- Species: L. gmelini

Binomial name
- Limonium gmelini (Willd.) Kuntze

Synonyms
- List: Limonium gmelinii (Willd.) Kuntze orth. var.; Limonium pycnanthum Kuntze; Statice balansae Boiss.; Statice emarginata Schur; Statice glauca Willd. ex Schult.; Statice gmelini Willd.; Statice pycnantha K.Koch; Taxanthema gmelinii Sweet; Taxanthema scoparium Sweet

= Limonium gmelini =

Species of plant

Limonium gmelini, the Siberian statice, is a species of flowering plant in the family Plumbaginaceae, native to east-central and southeastern Europe, Russia, the north Caucasus, Turkey, Iran, Kazakhstan, Kyrgyzstan, parts of Siberia, Xinjiang, and Mongolia. A widespread halophytic species, it is found growing in seeps, meadows, steppes, roadsides, and wastelands, as long as they are saline.

The unimproved species is available from commercial suppliers, and there are a number of cultivars, including 'Ste10' Dazzle Rocks, and 'Perestrojka'. The Royal Horticultural Society considers this clump-forming perennial's "smoky-blue, long-lasting flowers" to be "very attractive" to pollinators.

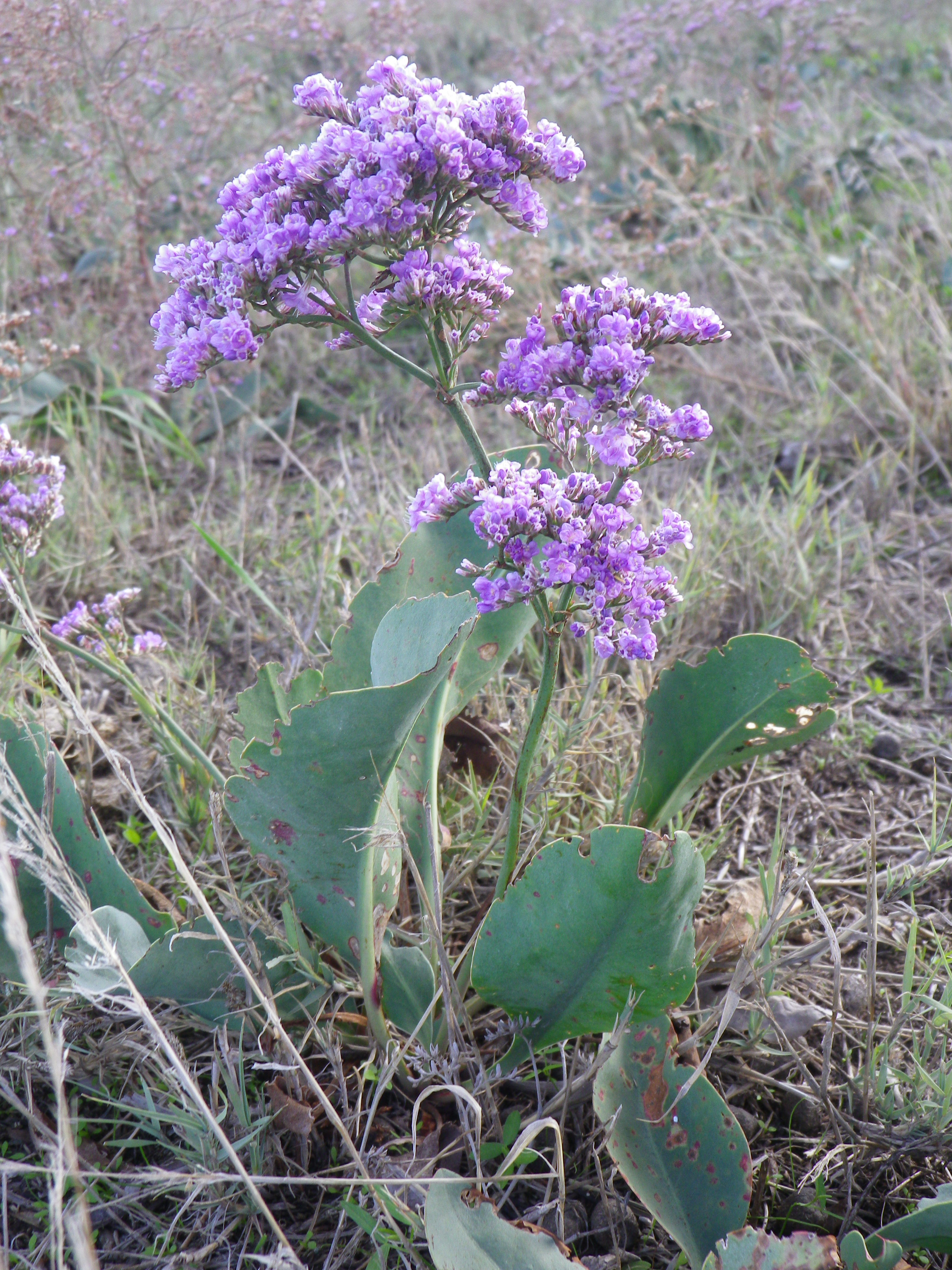
In a different light

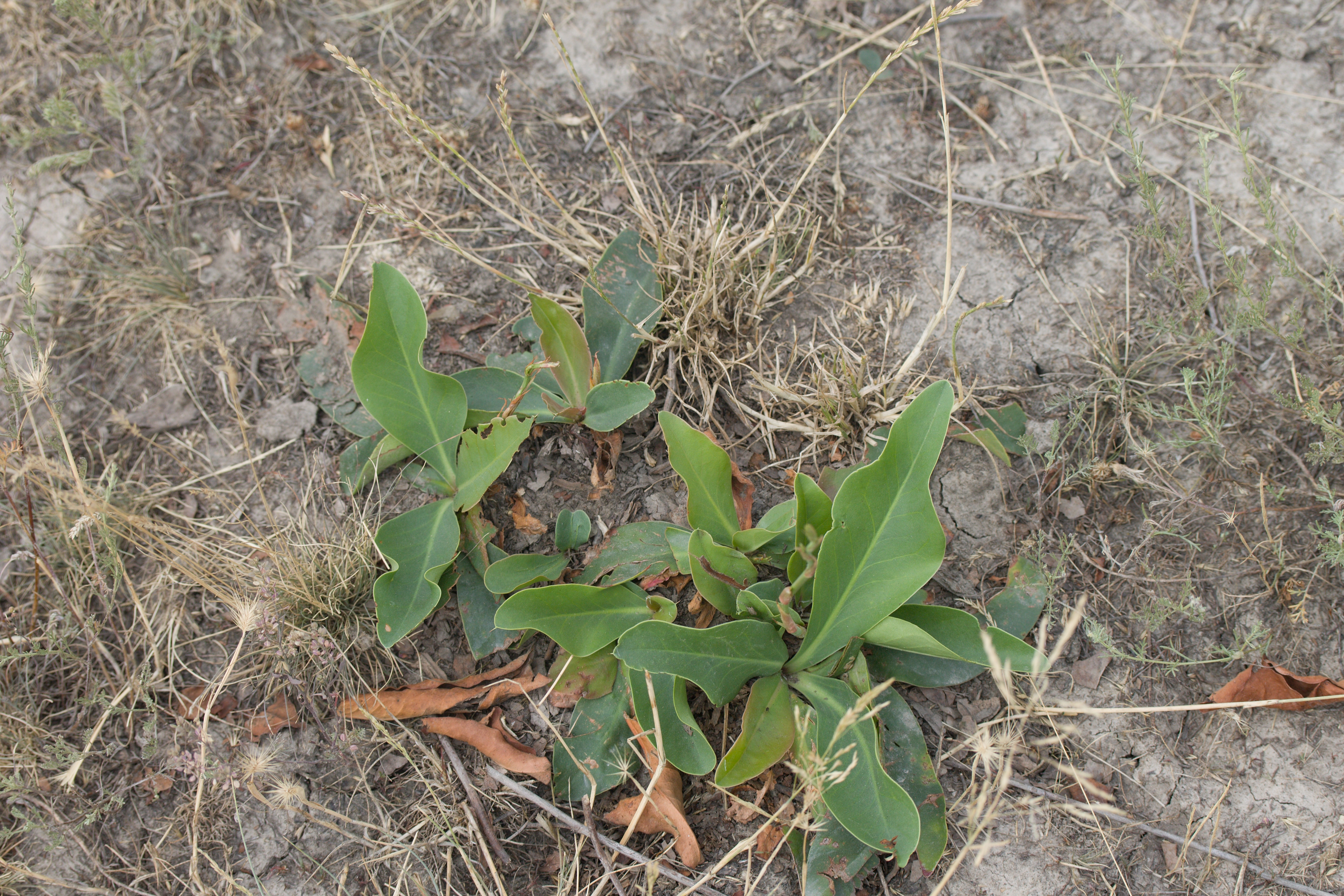
Clump of rosettes

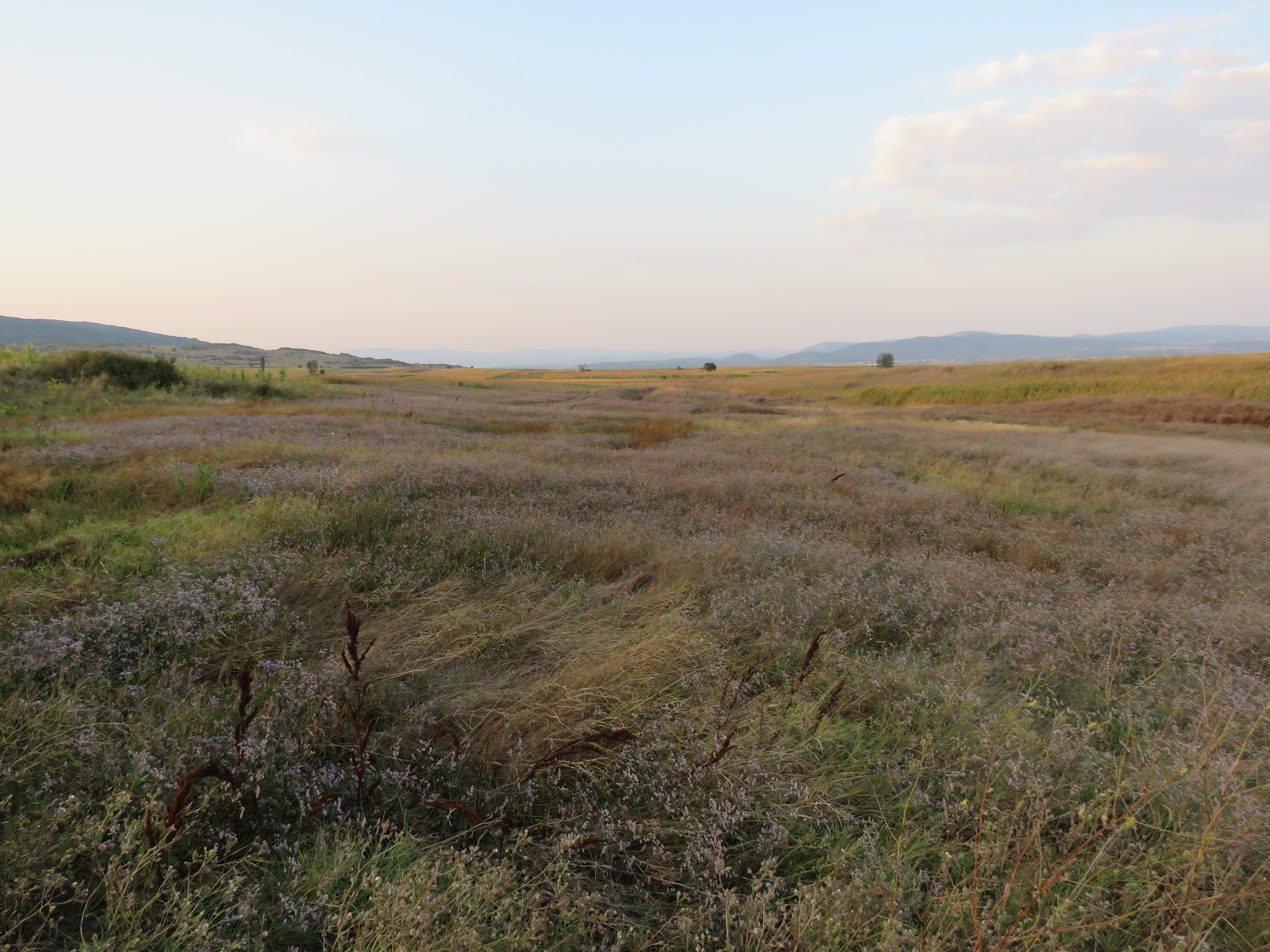
Dominating a meadow
