= Areticulata =

Scientific classification
- Kingdom: Animalia
- Phylum: Arthropoda
- Clade: Pancrustacea
- Class: Insecta
- Order: Lepidoptera
- Family: Nepticulidae
- Subfamily: Nepticulinae
- Genus: Areticulata; Scoble, 1983
- Species: A. leucosideae

Binomial name
- Areticulata leucosideae Scoble, 1983

Genus of moths

Areticulata is a monotypic moth genus of the family Nepticulidae. Its only species, Areticulata leucosideae, is found in South Africa. Both the genus and species were first described by Scoble in 1893.

The larvae feed on Leucosidea sericea. They probably mine the leaves of their host plant.
