= Varius ochnicola =

Scientific classification
- Kingdom: Animalia
- Phylum: Arthropoda
- Clade: Pancrustacea
- Class: Insecta
- Order: Lepidoptera
- Family: Nepticulidae
- Genus: Varius; Scoble, 1983
- Species: V. ochnicola

Binomial name
- Varius ochnicola (Vari, 1955)

Species of moth

Varius ochnicola is the only species in the monotypic moth genus Varius of the family Nepticulidae. The genus was erected by Scoble in 1983. The species was first described by Vari in 1955. It is found in South Africa.

The larvae feed on Ochna pulchra. They probably mine the leaves of their host.
