= Aphilanthopini =

Scientific classification
- Domain: Eukaryota
- Kingdom: Animalia
- Phylum: Arthropoda
- Class: Insecta
- Order: Hymenoptera
- Family: Philanthidae
- Tribe: Aphilanthopini; R. Bohart, 1966

Subfamily of insects

Aphilanthopinae is a subfamily of wasps in the family Philanthidae. There are two genera and 13 described species are in the Aphilanthopini.

== Genera ==
These two genera belong to the subfamily Aphilanthopinae:

- Aphilanthops Patton, 1881(ant queen-kidnapping wasps)
- Clypeadon Patton, 1897
