= Chiquibul Forest Reserve =

Forest reserve in Belize

The Chiquibul Forest Reserve (CFR) lies within Belize's Greater Mayan Mountains.

== Geography ==
The Chiquibul forest reserve lies adjacent to the Belize-Guatemalan border. Iconsists of 59,822 hectares. The Chiquibul Forest Reserve is bordered to the southwest, east, and south by the Chiquibul National Park, on the northwest edge by the Caracol Archaeological Reserve (CAR), and on the north side by the Mountain Pine Ridge. The reserve, along with the national park and archeological reserve, comprise the Chiquibul Forest.

== History ==
The site, which lies wholly within the Greater Mayan Mountains of Belize, was first designated as a forest reserve in 1956 when it covered an area of 184,925.9 hectares. Part of the reserve was then re-classified as the Chiquibul National Park and the Caracol Archeological Reserve. Since the reclassification in 1991, the reserve has covered 59,822 hectares. It is the largest managed reserve in Belize.

== Management ==
The reserve is managed for timber products and non-timber forest products. It is managed by Bulridge Limited under a long-term forest license issued by the Government of Belize in 2006, with the Belize Forest Department as the regulatory body for sustainable forest management. Bulridge Limited, under its long-term forest license, conducts selective logging, as well as silvicultural practices and road maintenance to promote sustainable logging operations.

== Threats ==
The primary threat to the flora and fauna faced by the reserve is poaching, illegal logging, harvesting of Xate by Guatemalan Xateros, and other illegal activities. These activities are performed primarily by residents of a number of Guatemalan communities that lie close to the Belize-Guatemalan border, and have easy access to the reserve. Access to the reserve from the Belizean side is more problematic.

== Flora and fauna ==
The Chiquibul Forest region, including the Chiquibul Forest Reserve, includes seventeen distinct ecosystems which are largely variants of lowland and submontane tropical evergreen broadleaf forests with differing levels of humidity and substrate types. This provides a diversity which habitat for a wide variety of fauna, including many rare species such as jaguar, ocelot, margay, and scarlet macaw. It is estimated the area receives 2,000 mm of rainfall per year and forms part of the Belize River watershed, and riparian areas that support the Baird’s tapir.
