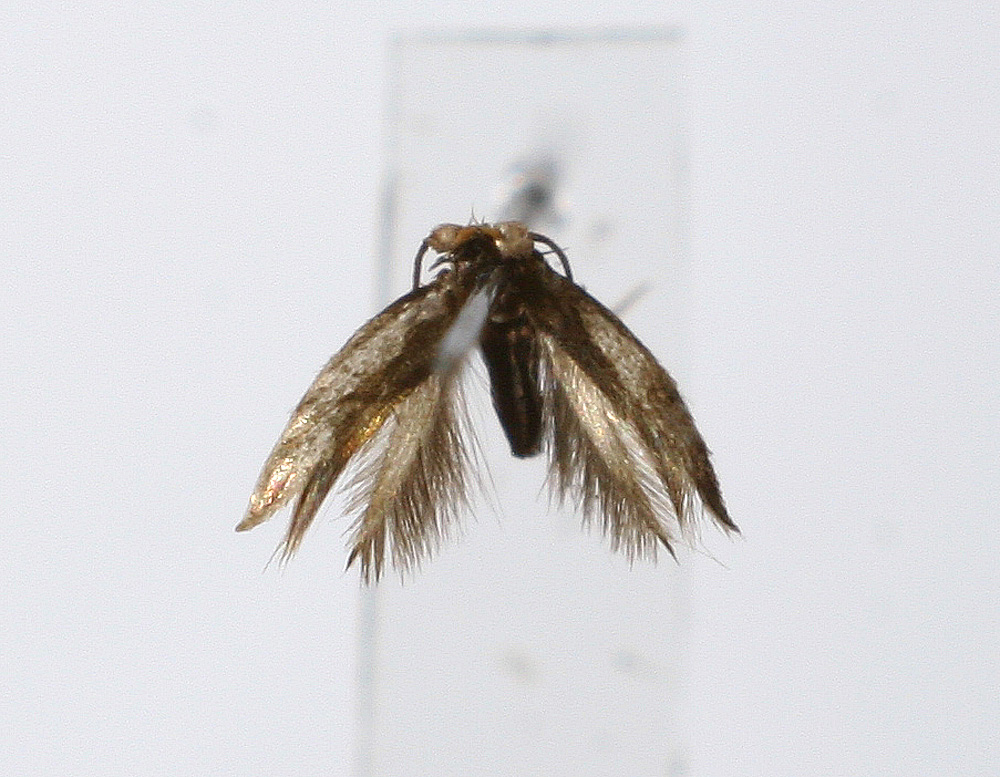
- Stigmella alnetella

Scientific classification
- Kingdom: Animalia
- Phylum: Arthropoda
- Class: Insecta
- Order: Lepidoptera
- Superfamily: Nepticuloidea
- Family: Nepticulidae

Subfamilies and genera
- Pectinivalvinae: Pectinivalva; Roscidotoga; Nepticulinae: Acalyptris; Areticulata; Bohemannia; Ectoedemia; Enteucha; Parafomoria; Simplimorpha; Stigmella; †Stigmellites; Trifurcula; Varius

Diversity
- About 22 genera and 862 species

= Nepticulidae =

Family of moths

Nepticulidae is a family of very small moths with a worldwide distribution. They are characterised by eyecaps over the eyes (see also Opostegidae, Bucculatricidae, Lyonetiidae). These pigmy moths or midget moths, as they are commonly known, include the smallest of all living moths, with a wingspan that can be as little as 3 mm in the case of the European pigmy sorrel moth, but more usually 3.5–10 mm. The wings of adult moths are narrow and lanceolate, sometimes with metallic markings, and with the venation very simplified compared to most other moths.

The minute larvae usually are leaf miners but some species also mine seeds or bark of trees. The Pectinivalvinae, characterised by a "pectinifer" on the valve of the male genitalia, are endemic to Australia, where they mine the leaves of the tree families Myrtaceae (Scoble, 1983) or Cunoniaceae (Eucryphiaceae), and Elaeocarpaceae (Hoare, 2000). This Australian group probably constitutes the sister group of other pigmy moths (the subfamily Nepticulinae), which is distributed around the world except Antarctica (Davis, 1999). Many species undoubtedly await description, especially in tropical areas.

Typical nepticulid moth leaf mines referable to the genera Stigmella and Ectoedemia are known from mid-Cretaceous fossils around 97 million years old.
