= List of moths of Australia (Nepticulidae) =

Partial list of Australian moths

This is a list of the Australian moth species of the family Nepticulidae. It also acts as an index to the species articles and forms part of the full List of moths of Australia.

== Pectinivalvinae ==
- Pectinivalva acmenae Hoare, 2013
- Pectinivalva anazona (Meyrick, 1906)
- Pectinivalva brevipalpa Hoare, 2013
- Pectinivalva caenodora (Meyrick, 1906)
- Pectinivalva chalcitis (Meyrick, 1906)
- Pectinivalva commoni Scoble, 1983
- Pectinivalva endocapna (Meyrick, 1906)
- Pectinivalva funeralis (Meyrick, 1906)
- Pectinivalva gilva (Meyrick, 1906)
- Pectinivalva libera (Meyrick, 1906)
- Pectinivalva melanotis (Meyrick, 1906)
- Pectinivalva minotaurus Hoare, 2013
- Pectinivalva mystaconota Hoare, 2013
- Pectinivalva planetis (Meyrick, 1906)
- Pectinivalva primigena (Meyrick, 1906)
- Pectinivalva quintiniae Hoare & Van Nieukerken, 2013
- Pectinivalva scotodes Hoare, 2013
- Pectinivalva trepida (Meyrick, 1906)
- Pectinivalva tribulatrix Van Nieukerken & Hoare, 2013
- Pectinivalva warburtonensis (Wilson, 1939)
- Roscidotoga callicomae Hoare, 2000
- Roscidotoga eucryphiae Hoare, 2000
- Roscidotoga lamingtonia Van Nieukerken, Van den Berg & Hoare, 2011
- Roscidotoga sapphiripes Hoare, 2000

== Nepticulinae ==
- Ectoedemia hadronycha Hoare, 2000
- Ectoedemia pelops Hoare, 2000
- Ectoedemia squamibunda Hoare, 2000
- Stigmella leucargyra (Meyrick, 1906)
- Stigmella phyllanthina (Meyrick, 1906)
- Stigmella symmora (Meyrick, 1906)
