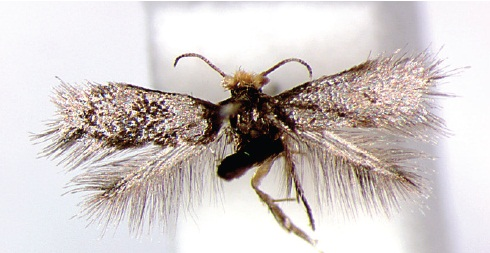
- Female, mounted
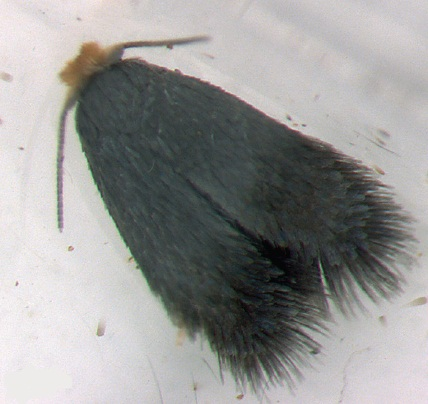
- Female, living

Scientific classification
- Domain: Eukaryota
- Kingdom: Animalia
- Phylum: Arthropoda
- Class: Insecta
- Order: Lepidoptera
- Family: Nepticulidae
- Genus: Pectinivalva
- Species: P. xenadelpha

Binomial name
- Pectinivalva xenadelpha Van Nieukerken & Hoare, 2013

= Pectinivalva xenadelpha =

Species of moth

Pectinivalva xenadelpha is a moth of the family Nepticulidae. It is found in Borneo, east Kalimantan.

The wingspan is about 4 mm for females. The thorax, tegulae and forewings are uniform shining dark grey with weak blue reflections. The hindwings are pale grey.

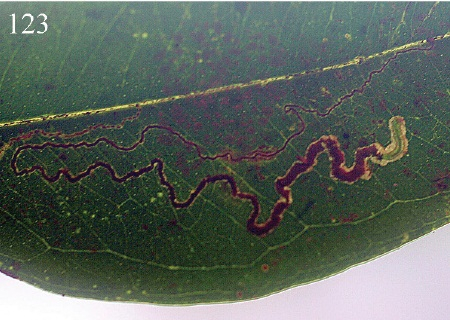
Mine

The larvae feed on Syzygium acuminatissimum. They mine the leaves of their host plant. The mine has the form of a long, very narrow contorted gallery. The first half is very narrow, running from the midrib to the leaf margin, or sometimes along the midrib. This part is filled with blackish frass. The second half is much wider, much contorted and often zigzagging. Here, the frass is compact, black and leaves narrow clear margins. The exit-hole is located on the underside and has the form of a semicircular hole. Pupation takes place in an ochreous cocoon.

== Etymology ==
The species is derived from the Greek xenos (meaning stranger, foreigner) and adelpha (meaning sister) and refers to the close relationship to Pectinivalva acmenae, as well as the great geographical distance between this and other known Pectinivalva species.
