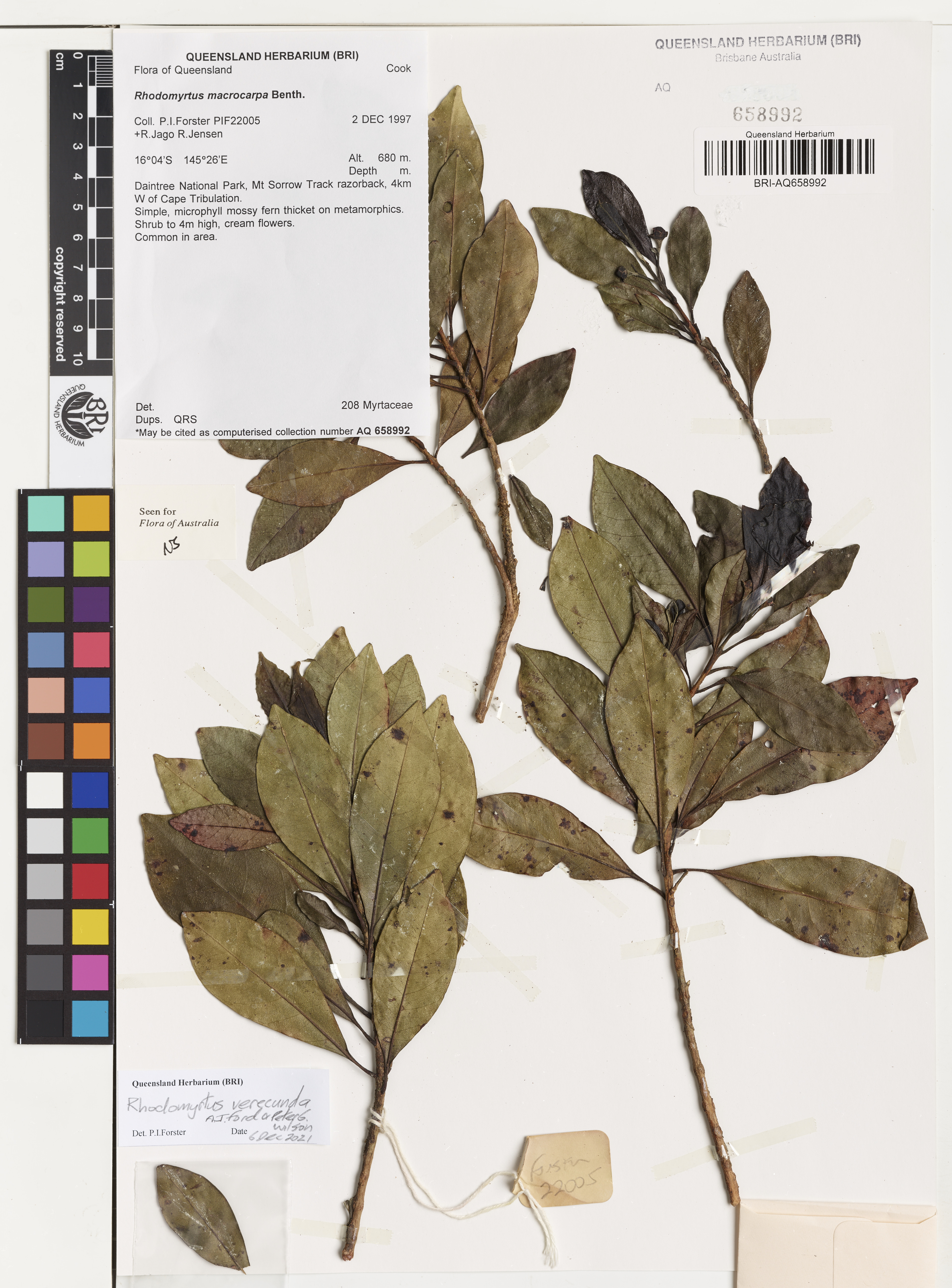

Conservation status
- Least Concern (NCA)

Scientific classification
- Kingdom: Plantae
- Clade: Tracheophytes
- Clade: Angiosperms
- Clade: Eudicots
- Clade: Rosids
- Order: Myrtales
- Family: Myrtaceae
- Genus: Rhodomyrtus
- Species: R. verecunda

Binomial name
- Rhodomyrtus verecunda A.J Ford & Peter G. Wilson

= Rhodomyrtus verecunda =

Species of flowering plant

Rhodomyrtus verecunda is an extremely rare species in the family Myrtaceae, which is endemic to the area in and around Cape Tribulation in North Queensland.

== Description ==
It grows as a shrub or small tree reaching heights of 3 to 5 metres. It differs from Rhodomyrtus macrocarpa in having brochidodromous venation, a funnel-shaped and smooth hypanthium shape and texture, longer styles of 7.5-8mms, a differing inflorescence type and ovule structure (solitary and bilocular) as well as a greater number of ovules per flower (4-6). It has white and yellow flowers with indehiscent, fleshy bacciferous fruit.

== Conservation ==
It has been assessed as Least Concern under the Nature Conservation Act 1992.
