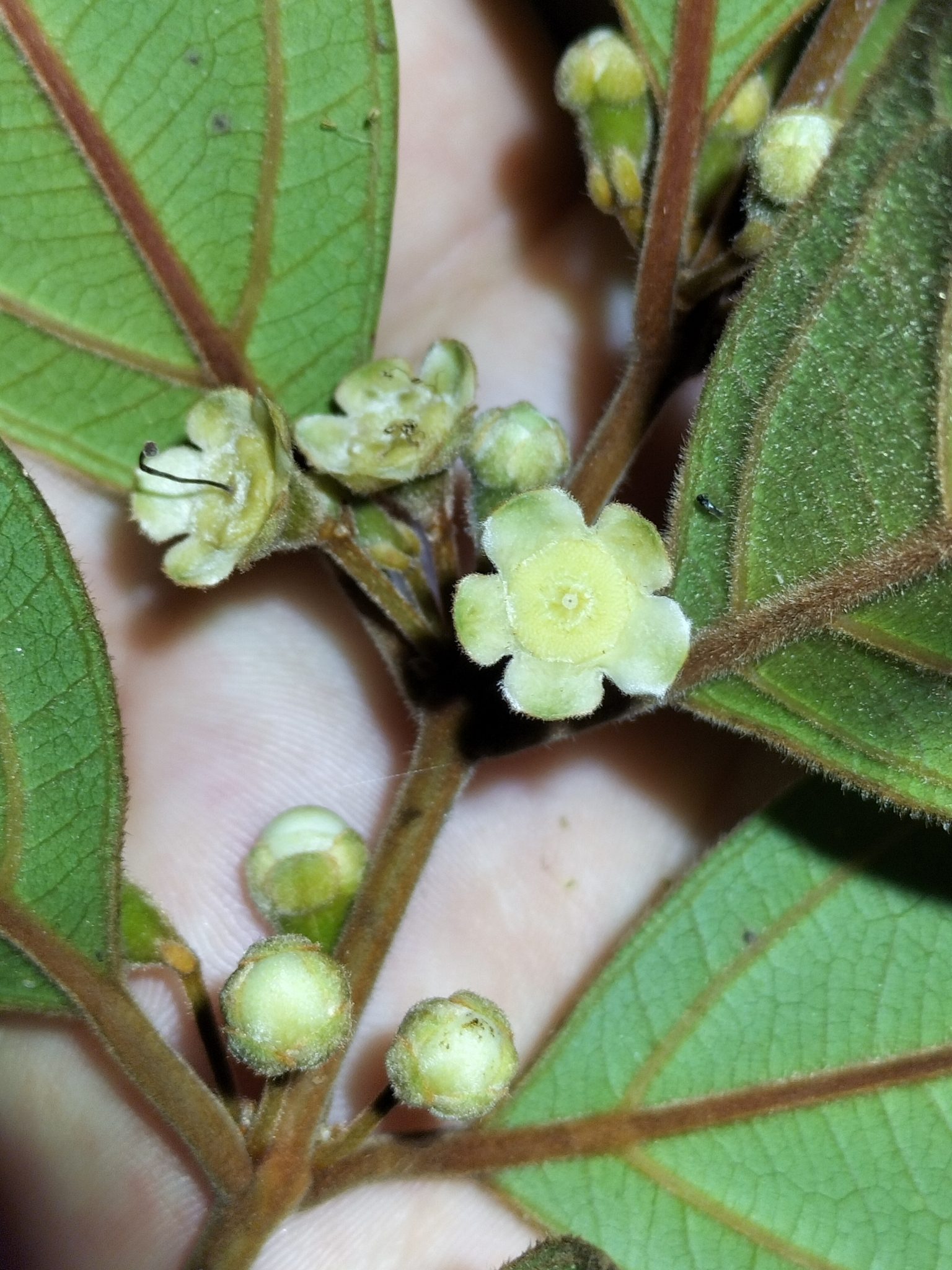

Conservation status
- Endangered (NCA)

Scientific classification
- Kingdom: Plantae
- Clade: Tracheophytes
- Clade: Angiosperms
- Clade: Eudicots
- Clade: Rosids
- Order: Myrtales
- Family: Myrtaceae
- Genus: Rhodomyrtus
- Species: R. pervagata

Binomial name
- Rhodomyrtus pervagata Guymer

= Rhodomyrtus pervagata =

Ironwood

Species of flowering plant

Rhodomyrtus pervagata, commonly known as ironwood or rusty rhodomyrtus, is a species of plants in the clove and eucalyptus family Myrtaceae, found only in northeastern Queensland, Australia. It is a shrub or small tree to 8 m (26 ft) high and a trunk diameter up to 14 cm (5.5 in), with simple 3-veined leaves and very small flowers up to 3.5 mm (0.14 in) diameter. It grows in and on the margins of coastal and sub-coastal rainforest, from the Windsor Tablelands south to the Paluma Range National Park. It prefers soils derived from granite or basalt. The species epithet pervagata means 'common' and refers to its habit of growing along roadsides.

== Conservation ==
This species is listed as endangered under the Queensland Government's Nature Conservation Act. As of 31 December 2024, it has not been assessed by the International Union for Conservation of Nature (IUCN).
