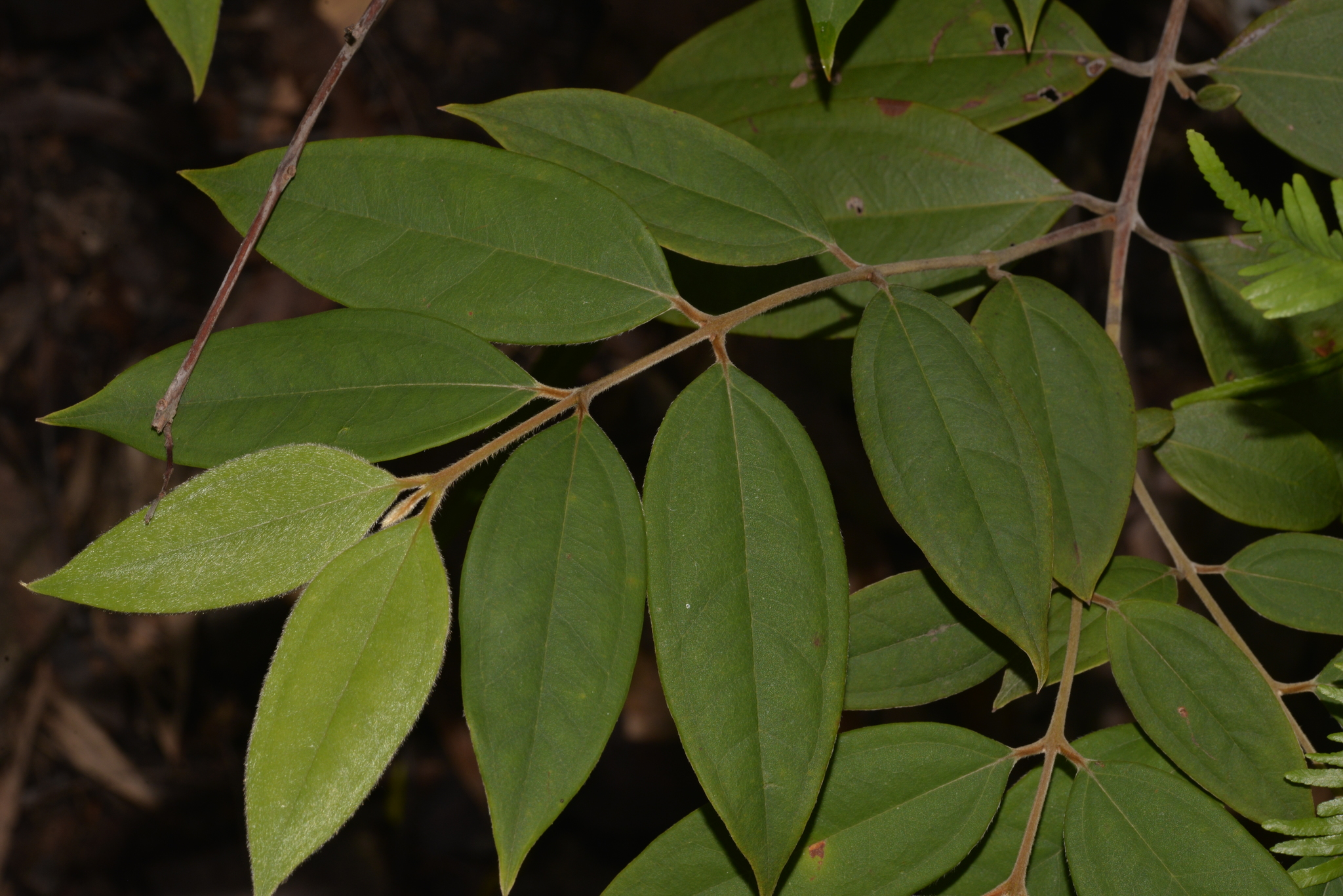

Conservation status
- Least Concern (IUCN 3.1)
- Least Concern (NCA)

Scientific classification
- Kingdom: Plantae
- Clade: Tracheophytes
- Clade: Angiosperms
- Clade: Eudicots
- Clade: Rosids
- Order: Myrtales
- Family: Myrtaceae
- Genus: Rhodomyrtus
- Species: R. trineura

Binomial name
- Rhodomyrtus trineura (F.Muell.) Benth.

Subspecies and varieties
- Rhodomyrtus trineura var. canescens (C.T.White) A.J.Scott; Rhodomyrtus trineura subsp. capensis Guymer; Rhodomyrtus trineura var. macrophylla Domin; Rhodomyrtus trineura var. novoguineensis (Diels) A.J.Scott; Rhodomyrtus trineura subsp. trineura

Synonyms
- Myrtus trineura F.Muell.

= Rhodomyrtus trineura =

Ironwood

Species of plant

Rhodomyrtus trineura is a species of shrub or tree in the family Myrtaceae.

== Description ==
As a small tree it can grow to be 6 metres in height. Its flowering and fruiting time lasts from January to June. It has indehiscent, fleshy bacciferous fruit.

== Habitat and distribution ==
It is native to the Maluku Islands, New Guinea, the Bismarck Archipelago, the D'Entrecasteaux Islands, and Queensland south to Cooroy. Its diverse habitat ranges from low lying wet sclerophyll forests to montane rainforests with a distribution in the tropics and subtropics.

== Conservation ==
It has been assessed as Least Concern under the Nature Conservation Act 1992. The IUCN Red List also assesses the species as Least Concern.
