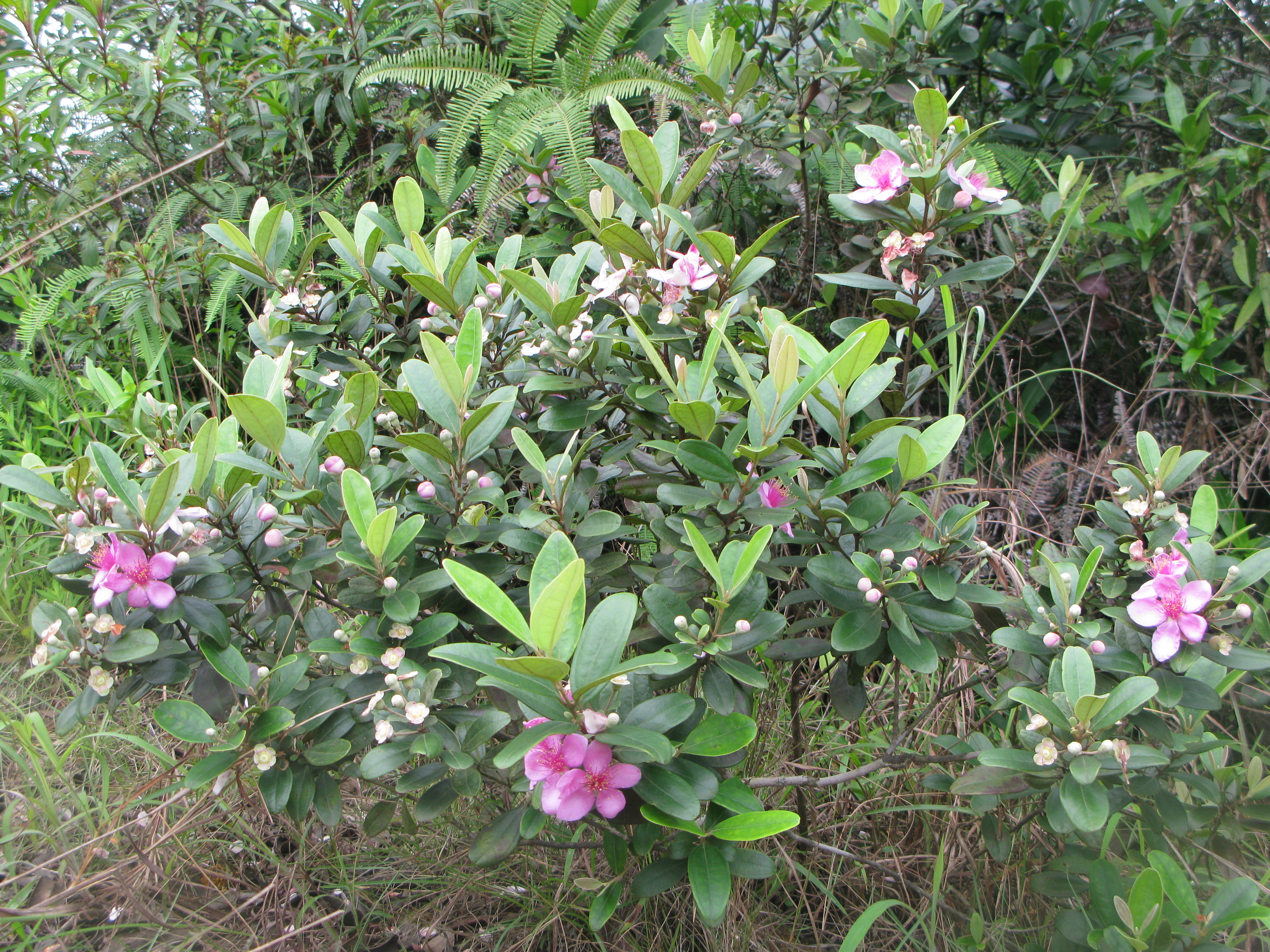

Conservation status
- Least Concern (IUCN 3.1)

Scientific classification
- Kingdom: Plantae
- Clade: Tracheophytes
- Clade: Angiosperms
- Clade: Eudicots
- Clade: Rosids
- Order: Myrtales
- Family: Myrtaceae
- Genus: Rhodomyrtus
- Species: R. tomentosa

Binomial name
- Rhodomyrtus tomentosa (Aiton) Hassk.

Varieties
- Rhodomyrtus tomentosa var. parviflora (Alston) A.J.Scott; Rhodomyrtus tomentosa var. tomentosa

Synonyms
- Cynomyrtus tomentosa (Aiton) Scriv.; Myrtus tomentosa Aiton; synonyms of var. parviflora: Rhodomyrtus parviflora Alston; synonyms of var. tomentosa: Myrtus canescens Lour.

= Rhodomyrtus tomentosa =

Species of flowering plant

Rhodomyrtus tomentosa also known as rose myrtle, is a flowering plant in the family Myrtaceae, native to southern and southeastern Asia, from India, east to southern China, Hong Kong, Taiwan and the Philippines, and south to Malaysia and Sulawesi. It grows in coasts, natural forest, riparian zones, wetlands, moist and wet forests, bog margins, from sea level up to 2400 m elevation.

== Description ==
Rhodomyrtus tomentosa is an evergreen shrub growing up to 4 m (12 feet) tall. The leaves are opposite, leathery, 5–7 cm long and 2–3.5 cm broad, three-veined from the base, oval, obtuse to sharp pointed at the tip, glossy green above, densely grey or rarely yellowish-hairy beneath, with a wide petiole and an entire margin. The flowers are solitary or in clusters of two or three, 2.5–3 cm diameter, with five petals which are tinged white on the outside with purplish-pink or all pink.

The fruit is edible, 10–15 mm long, purple, round, three or four-celled, capped with persistent calyx lobes, soft, with 40-45 seeds in a double row in each cell; seed dispersal is by frugivorous birds and mammals. Seed production and germination rates are high.

Synonyms include Myrtus canescens Lour., Myrtus tomentosa Aiton, Rhodomyrtus parviflora Alston, and Rhodomyrtus tomentosa (Aiton) Wight. Common names include Ceylon hill gooseberry (English), Downy myrtle (English-Florida), Downy rose myrtle (English-Florida), Feijoa (French), Hill gooseberry (English), Hill guava (English), Isenberg bush (English-Hawaii), Myrte-groseille (French), Kemunting (Malaysia), Gangrenzi (China) and Rose myrtle (English-Florida).

== Cultivation and uses ==
It has shown promise as a fire retardant species for use in fire breaks in the Himalayas. It is a popular ornamental plant in gardens in tropical and subtropical areas, grown for its abundant flowers and sweet, edible fruit. The fruit can be made into pies and jams, or used in salads. In Phú Quốc, Vietnam, the fruits are used to produce a wine called rượu sim, and are also made into jellies, or freshly canned with syrup for export.

== Management ==
It has become an invasive species in some countries, spreading to form large, monospecific thickets that displace native flora and fauna. Areas especially affected include Florida, Hawaii, and French Polynesia.

It is able to invade a range of habitats, from pine flatwoods to mangrove marshes. It grows in a wide range of soil types, including salty coastal soil, but is sensitive to heavy salt spray. It is fire-adapted, meaning it is able to resprout prolifically after fire.

This species invades the understory of native pinelands in Florida, forming dense monoculture thickets that displace native flora and fauna through overcrowding and competition. Has the potential to alter the natural fire regimes of invaded areas.

A risk assessment of Rhodomyrtus tomentosa for Hawaii and other Pacific islands was prepared by the Kaulunani Urban Forestry Program and US Forest Service. The alien plant screening system is derived from Pheloung et al. (1999) with minor modifications for use in Pacific islands. The result is a score of 8 and a recommendation of "Likely to cause significant ecological or economic harm in Hawaii and on other Pacific Islands as determined by a high WRA score, which is based on published sources describing species biology and behavior in Hawaii and/or other parts of the world."

In integrated management, seedlings can be removed manually. Mature shrubs may be felled using a chainsaw or brush cutter, and the stumps treated with a commercial herbicide.

It was introduced to Florida and Hawaii in about 1920 (Degener, 1963 in Langeland and Burks, 1999). In Florida it has now spread to 17 counties (Center for Natural Resources, 2003). On Hawaii it was forming impenetrable thickets on Kauai and Hilo by the 1950s (Hosaka and Thistle, 1954 in Langeland and Burks, 1999). It is currently on the State of Hawaii noxious weed list (Meyer, 1998 in PIER, 2003). Research was conducted at the University of Florida 1998–2000 to describe the ecology and determine effective control methods for this species.

It is also a serious problem on Raiatea, French Polynesia (Meyer, 1998 in PIER, 2003).

== Gallery ==
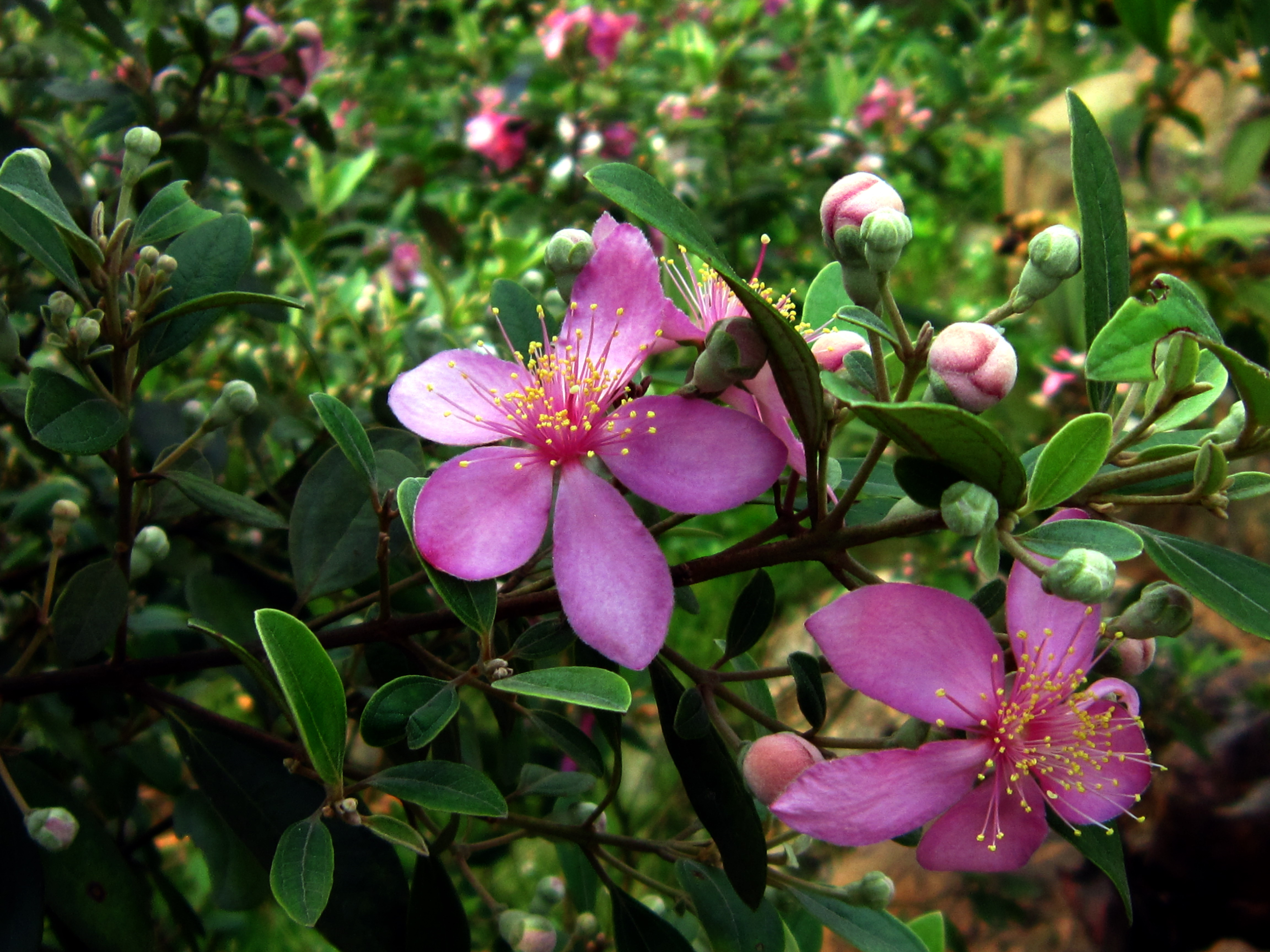
Rhodomyrtus tomentosa flowers

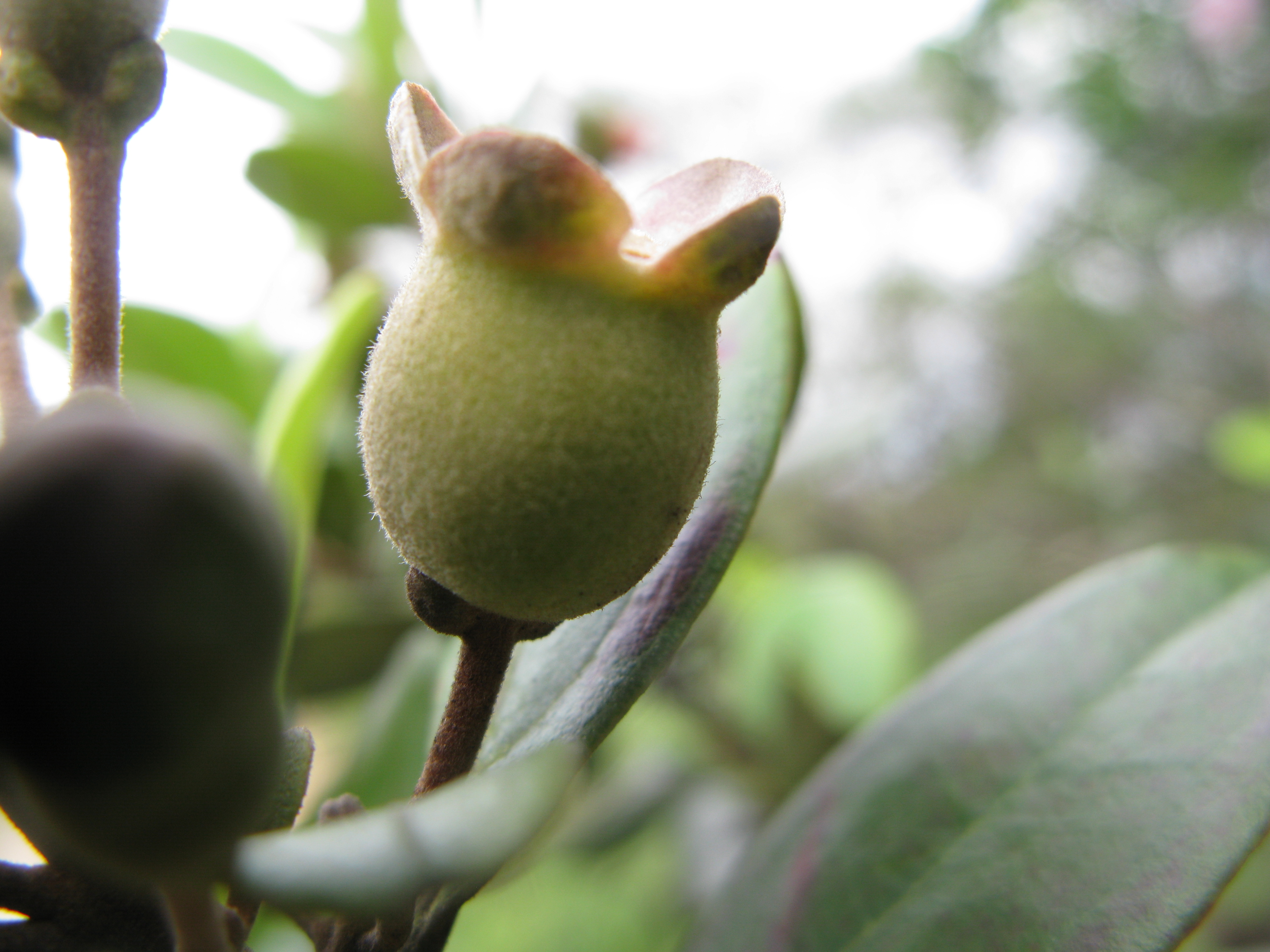
Rhodomyrtus tomentosa immature fruit.

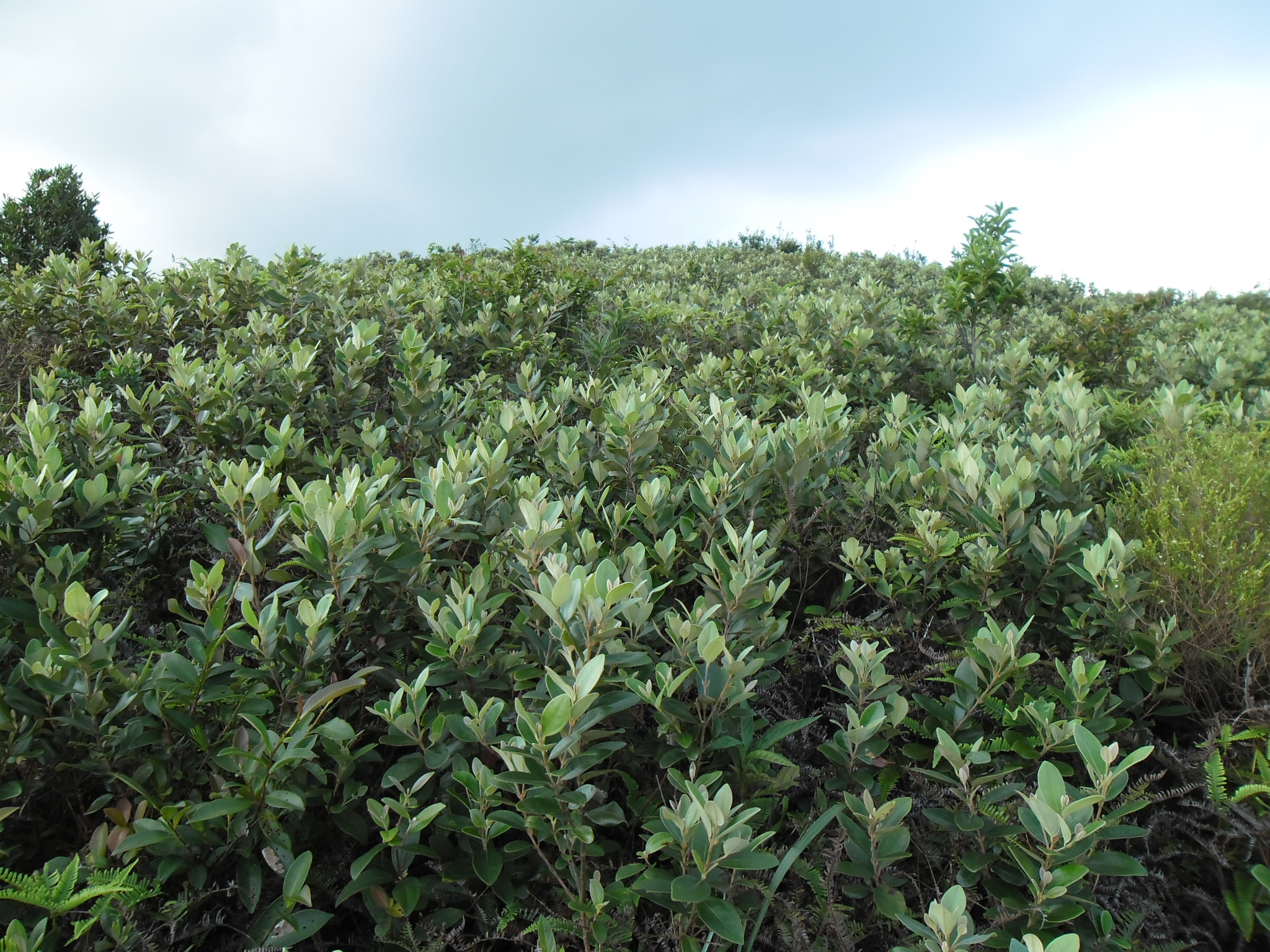
Rhodomyrtus tomentosa bushes in Sai Kung, Hong Kong.

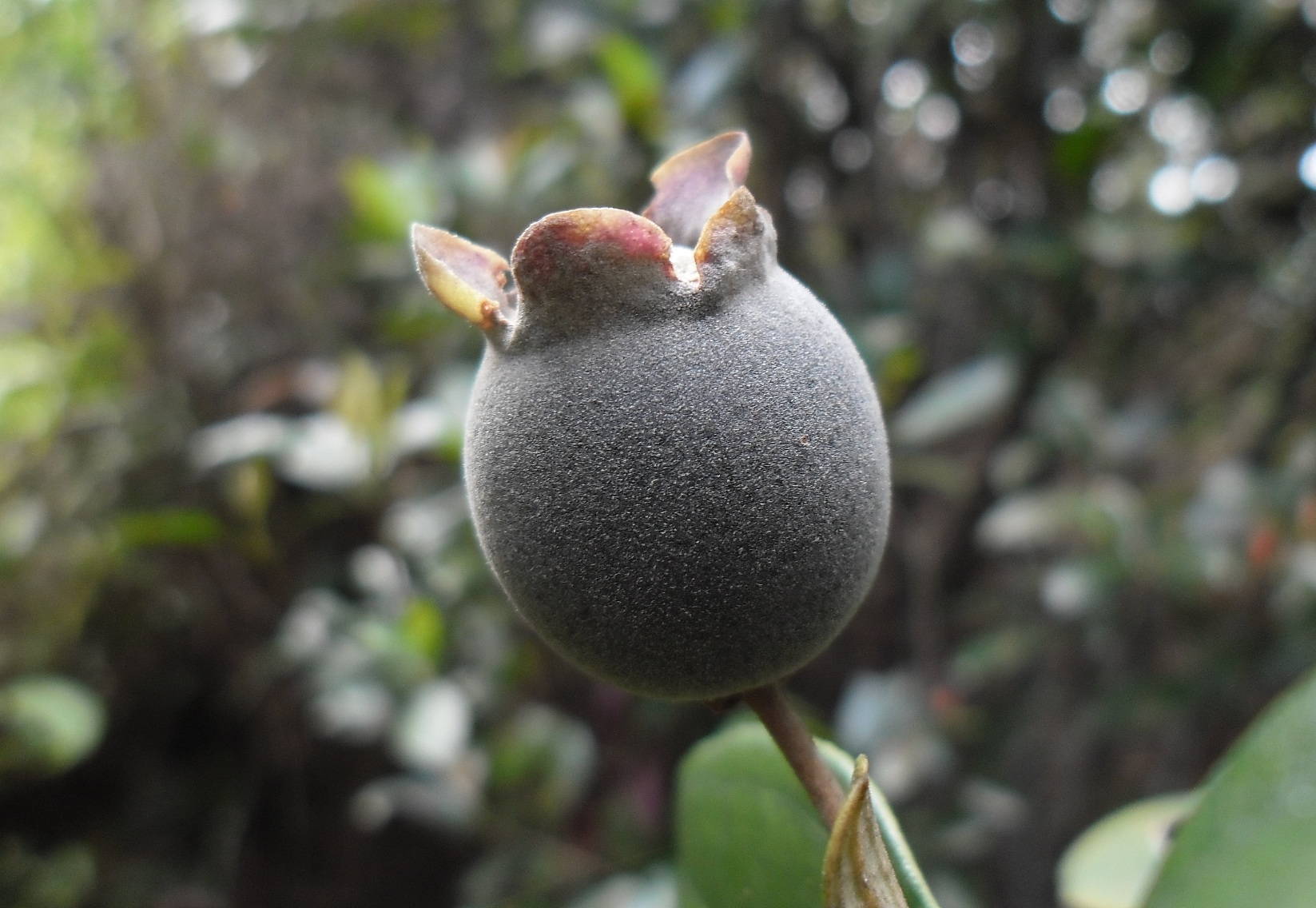
Up close, and high definition of the native rose myrtle, with a ripe fruit in Hong Kong.
