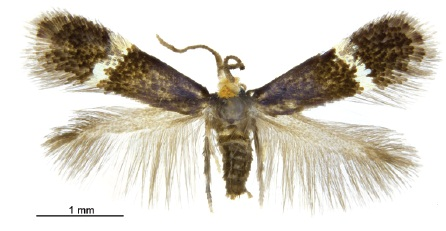
- Pectinivalva brevipalpa

Scientific classification
- Kingdom: Animalia
- Phylum: Arthropoda
- Clade: Pancrustacea
- Class: Insecta
- Order: Lepidoptera
- Family: Nepticulidae
- Genus: Pectinivalva; Scoble, 1983

= Pectinivalva =

Genus of moths

Pectinivalva is a genus of moths of the family Nepticulidae.

== Species ==
- Subgenus Pectinivalva
  - Pectinivalva caenodora (Meyrick, 1906)
  - Pectinivalva chalcitis (Meyrick, 1906)
  - Pectinivalva commoni Scoble, 1983
  - Pectinivalva endocapna (Meyrick, 1906)
  - Pectinivalva gilva (Meyrick, 1906)
  - Pectinivalva melanotis (Meyrick, 1906)
  - Pectinivalva mystaconota Hoare, 2013
- Subgenus Casanovula Hoare, 2013
  - Pectinivalva brevipalpa Hoare, 2013
  - Pectinivalva minotaurus Hoare, 2013
- Subgenus Menurella Hoare, 2013
  - Pectinivalva acmenae Hoare, 2013
  - Pectinivalva anazona (Meyrick, 1906)
  - Pectinivalva funeralis (Meyrick, 1906)
  - Pectinivalva libera (Meyrick, 1906)
  - Pectinivalva planetis (Meyrick, 1906)
  - Pectinivalva primigena (Meyrick, 1906)
  - Pectinivalva quintiniae Hoare & Van Nieukerken, 2013
  - Pectinivalva scotodes Hoare, 2013
  - Pectinivalva trepida (Meyrick, 1906)
  - Pectinivalva tribulatrix Van Nieukerken & Hoare, 2013
  - Pectinivalva warburtonensis (Wilson, 1939)
  - Pectinivalva xenadelpha Van Nieukerken & Hoare, 2013
