= Roscidotoga =

Scientific classification
- Domain: Eukaryota
- Kingdom: Animalia
- Phylum: Arthropoda
- Class: Insecta
- Order: Lepidoptera
- Family: Nepticulidae
- Subfamily: Pectinivalvinae
- Genus: Roscidotoga; Hoare, 2000

Genus of moths

Roscidotoga is a genus of moths of the family Nepticulidae.

== Species ==
- Roscidotoga callicomae Hoare, 2000
- Roscidotoga eucryphiae Hoare, 2000
- Roscidotoga lamingtonia Van Nieukerken, Van den Berg & Hoare, 2011
- Roscidotoga sapphiripes Hoare, 2000
