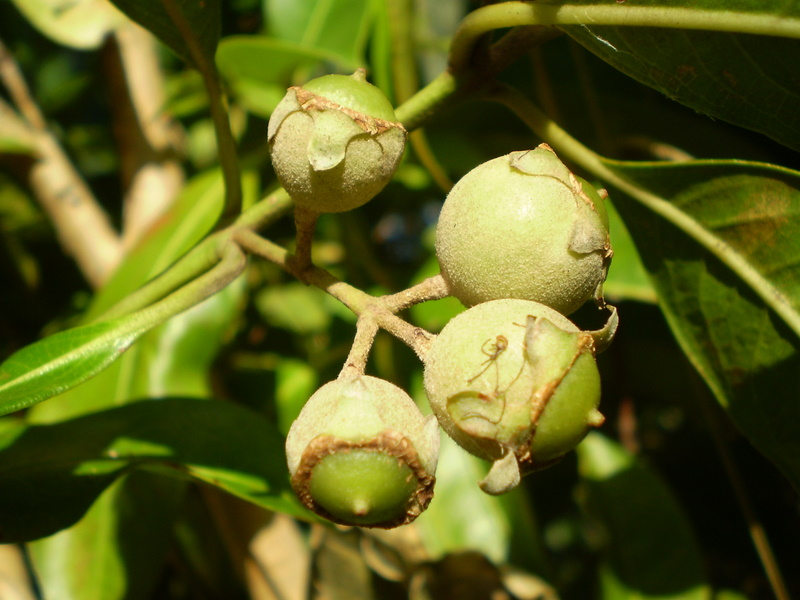

Conservation status
- Critically endangered (EPBC Act)

Scientific classification
- Kingdom: Plantae
- Clade: Tracheophytes
- Clade: Angiosperms
- Clade: Eudicots
- Clade: Rosids
- Order: Myrtales
- Family: Myrtaceae
- Genus: Rhodomyrtus
- Species: R. psidioides

Binomial name
- Rhodomyrtus psidioides (G.Don) Benth.

Synonyms
- Nelitris psidioides G.Don

= Rhodomyrtus psidioides =

Species of shrub

Rhodomyrtus psidioides, the native guava, is a shrub or small rainforest tree up to 12 m (39 ft) high, member of the botanical family Myrtaceae, native to eastern Australia.

Leaves are ovate to elliptic or oblong, 5–25 cm (2–10 in) long and 2.5–6.5 cm (1–3 in) wide, with a glossy upper surface and paler lower surface. Oil glands are numerous, and the leaves have a pineapple-like fragrance and stickiness when crushed. White or pink flowers occur in raceme-like inflorescences; followed by a berry, 15–25 mm (0.59–0.98 in) long, 10–15 mm (0.39–0.59 in) wide, yellow and fleshy.

== Conservation status ==
Rhodomyrtus psidioides is listed as "critically endangered under the Australian Environment Protection and Biodiversity Conservation Act 1999, Queensland Nature Conservation Act 1992, and the New South Wales Biodiversity Conservation Act 2016.

== Uses ==
The berry of native guava is edible with a pleasant aromatic flavor. The tree is fast growing and has an important successional role in rainforest regeneration.
