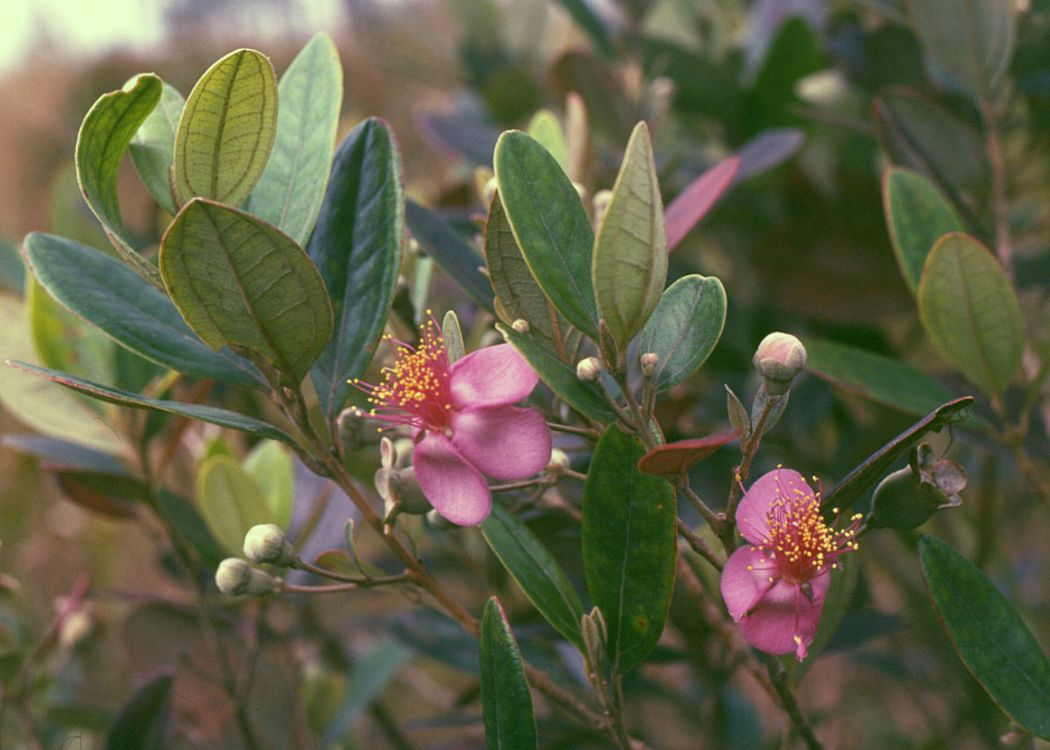
- Rhodomyrtus tomentosa in Phnom Bokor National Park, Cambodia

Scientific classification
- Kingdom: Plantae
- Clade: Tracheophytes
- Clade: Angiosperms
- Clade: Eudicots
- Clade: Rosids
- Order: Myrtales
- Family: Myrtaceae
- Subfamily: Myrtoideae
- Tribe: Myrteae
- Genus: Rhodomyrtus (DC.) Rchb.

Synonyms
- Cynomyrtus Scriv.; Psidiomyrtus Guillaumin

= Rhodomyrtus =

Genus of flowering plants

Rhodomyrtus is a group of shrubs and trees in the family Myrtaceae, described as a genus in 1841 and native to southern China, the Indian subcontinent, Southeast Asia, Melanesia, and Australia.

Its greatest levels of diversity are in New Guinea and northeastern Australia. Snow et al. confirmed in 2008 that the genus is polyphyletic, i.e. it includes taxa that do not have a common predecessor, and they recommended more detailed DNA studies to determine if and how it should be split into two or more smaller monophyletic genera.

== Species ==
As of November 2024, Plants of the World Online accepts the following 22 species:

- Rhodomyrtus effusa Guymer – Queensland
- Rhodomyrtus elegans (Blume) A.J. Scott – Maluku Islands, New Guinea
- Rhodomyrtus guymeriana N.Snow & J.P.Atwood – Papua New Guinea
- Rhodomyrtus kaweaensis N.Snow – Papua New Guinea
- Rhodomyrtus lanata Guymer – Papua New Guinea
- Rhodomyrtus locellata (Guillaumin) Burret – New Caledonia
- Rhodomyrtus longisepala N. Snow & J. McFadden – Papua New Guinea
- Rhodomyrtus macrocarpa Benth. – New Guinea, Aru Islands, Queensland
- Rhodomyrtus mengenensis N.Snow – Papua New Guinea
- Rhodomyrtus misimana N.Snow – Papua New Guinea
- Rhodomyrtus montana Guymer – Western New Guinea
- Rhodomyrtus obovata C.T.White – Papua New Guinea
- Rhodomyrtus pervagata Guymer – Queensland
- Rhodomyrtus pinnatinervis C.T.White – New Guinea, Bismarck Archipelago
- Rhodomyrtus psidioides (G.Don) Benth. – Queensland, New South Wales
- Rhodomyrtus salomonensis (C.T.White) A.J.Scott – Solomon Islands
- Rhodomyrtus sericea Burret – Queensland
- Rhodomyrtus surigaoensis Elmer – Philippines
- Rhodomyrtus takeuchii N.Snow & J.Cantley – Papua New Guinea
- Rhodomyrtus tomentosa (Aiton) Hassk. – India to southern China and Taiwan, Indo-China, Melanesia
- Rhodomyrtus trineura (F.Muell.) Benth. – Maluku Islands, New Guinea, Bismarck Archipelago, Queensland
- Rhodomyrtus verecunda A.J.Ford & Peter G.Wilson – Queensland
