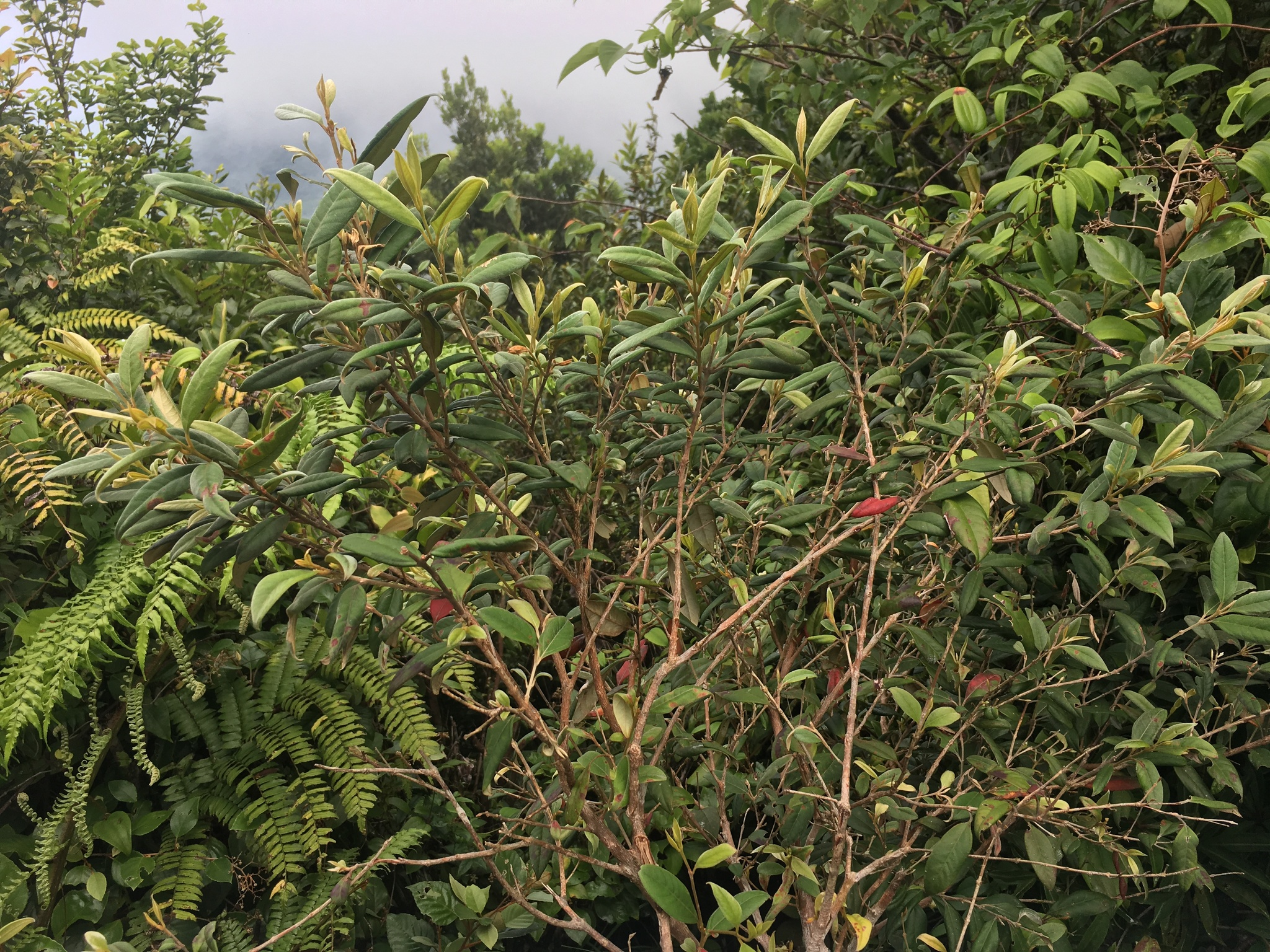

Conservation status
- Least Concern (NCA)

Scientific classification
- Kingdom: Plantae
- Clade: Tracheophytes
- Clade: Angiosperms
- Clade: Eudicots
- Clade: Rosids
- Order: Myrtales
- Family: Myrtaceae
- Genus: Rhodomyrtus
- Species: R. sericea

Binomial name
- Rhodomyrtus sericea Burret

= Rhodomyrtus sericea =

Species of plant

Rhodomyrtus sericea is a species of shrub or tree in the family Myrtaceae. It is endemic to North Queensland.

== Description ==
As a tree it can grow to be 15 metres in height. It flowers from August to March and fruits from December to June. It has indehiscent, fleshy bacciferous fruit.

== Distribution ==
It is found in the Wet Tropics and the Mackay Region, in areas of tropical or subtropical montane rainforest.

== Conservation ==
It has been assessed as Least Concern under the Nature Conservation Act 1992.
