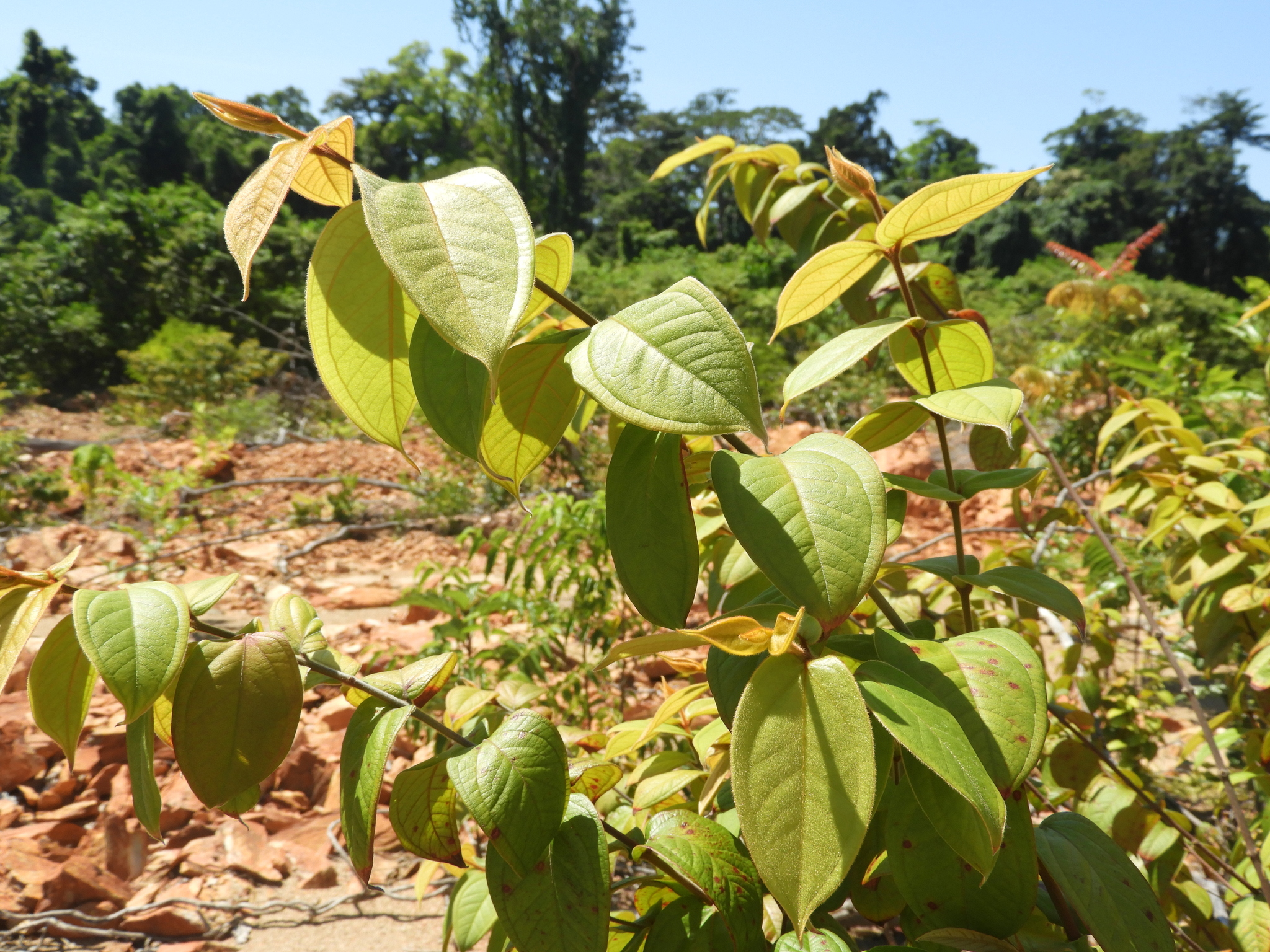

Conservation status
- Endangered (NCA)

Scientific classification
- Kingdom: Plantae
- Clade: Tracheophytes
- Clade: Angiosperms
- Clade: Eudicots
- Clade: Rosids
- Order: Myrtales
- Family: Myrtaceae
- Genus: Rhodomyrtus
- Species: R. effusa

Binomial name
- Rhodomyrtus effusa Guymer

= Rhodomyrtus effusa =

Species of plant

Rhodomyrtus effusa is a species of shrub or tree in the family Myrtaceae. It is endemic to the Wet Tropics of northeast Queensland.

== Description ==
As a small tree it can grow to be 6 metres in height. It flowers from October to February and fruits from January to August. It has indehiscent, fleshy bacciferous fruit.

== Conservation ==
It has been assessed as Endangered under the Nature Conservation Act 1992.
