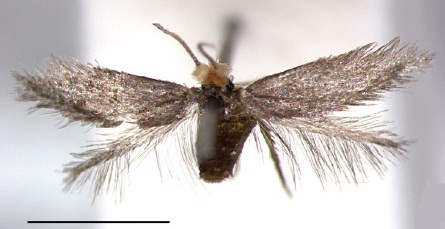
- Female
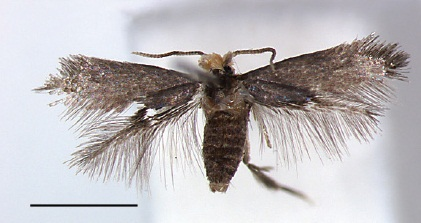
- Male

Scientific classification
- Domain: Eukaryota
- Kingdom: Animalia
- Phylum: Arthropoda
- Class: Insecta
- Order: Lepidoptera
- Family: Nepticulidae
- Genus: Pectinivalva
- Species: P. tribulatrix

Binomial name
- Pectinivalva tribulatrix Van Nieukerken & Hoare, 2013

= Pectinivalva tribulatrix =

Species of moth

Pectinivalva tribulatrix is a moth of the family Nepticulidae. It is found in northern Queensland (Cape Tribulation).

The wingspan is 3.5 mm for males and 3.2 mm for females. The thorax and forewings are entirely shining grey fuscous. The hindwings are grey, with an androconial pocket in the basal half.

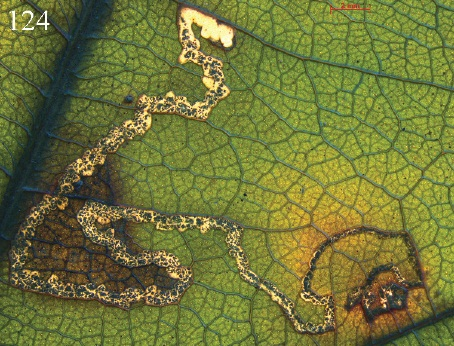
Mine

The larvae feed on Rhodomyrtus macrocarpa. They mine the leaves of their host plant. The mine has the form of a narrow, long gallery, either completely meandering, or partly straight and following a major vein. The frass is black, broken and dispersed over the total gallery width, not leaving clear margins. The edges of the gallery are not straight but irregular. The exit-hole is located on the underside and consists of a semicircular to oval hole. Pupation takes place in a reddish-brown cocoon.

== Etymology ==
The species name is derived from the Latin tribulare (meaning to press), hence tribulatio (meaning distress, trouble) or tribulatrix (meaning one who causes trouble) and refers partly to the type locality (Cape Tribulation), and partly to difficulties the authors encountered in identifying the host plant.
