= Roscidotoga sapphiripes =

Scientific classification
- Domain: Eukaryota
- Kingdom: Animalia
- Phylum: Arthropoda
- Class: Insecta
- Order: Lepidoptera
- Family: Nepticulidae
- Genus: Roscidotoga
- Species: R. sapphiripes

Binomial name
- Roscidotoga sapphiripes Hoare, 2000

Species of moth

Roscidotoga sapphiripes is a moth of the family Nepticulidae. It is found along the north-eastern coast of Queensland.

The larvae feed on Elaeocarpus obovatus. They mine the leaves of their host plant.
