= Pectinivalva chalcitis =

Scientific classification
- Kingdom: Animalia
- Phylum: Arthropoda
- Class: Insecta
- Order: Lepidoptera
- Family: Nepticulidae
- Genus: Pectinivalva
- Species: P. chalcitis

Binomial name
- Pectinivalva chalcitis (Meyrick, 1906)

Synonyms
- Nepticula chalcitis Meyrick, 1906

Species of moth

Pectinivalva chalcitis is a moth of the family Nepticulidae. It is found along the south-western coast of Western Australia.

The wingspan is about 5.5 mm for females.

The larvae possibly feed on Eucalyptus. They probably mine the leaves of their host plant.
