= Pectinivalva anazona =

Scientific classification
- Domain: Eukaryota
- Kingdom: Animalia
- Phylum: Arthropoda
- Class: Insecta
- Order: Lepidoptera
- Family: Nepticulidae
- Genus: Pectinivalva
- Species: P. anazona

Binomial name
- Pectinivalva anazona (Meyrick, 1906)

Synonyms
- Nepticula anazona Meyrick, 1906

Species of moth

Pectinivalva anazona is a moth of the family Nepticulidae. It is found along the Queensland coast of Australia, first described from around Brisbane.

The wingspan is about 4 mm for females.

Larvae probably mine the leaves of their host plant.
