= Pectinivalva gilva =

Scientific classification
- Kingdom: Animalia
- Phylum: Arthropoda
- Class: Insecta
- Order: Lepidoptera
- Family: Nepticulidae
- Genus: Pectinivalva
- Species: P. gilva

Binomial name
- Pectinivalva gilva (Meyrick, 1906)

Synonyms
- Nepticula gilva Meyrick, 1906

Species of moth

Pectinivalva gilva is a moth of the family Nepticulidae. It is found along the south-eastern coast of New South Wales.

The wingspan is about 5.7 mm for females.

The larvae probably feeds on Eucalyptus species. They probably mine the leaves of their host plant.
