= Pectinivalva commoni =

Scientific classification
- Kingdom: Animalia
- Phylum: Arthropoda
- Clade: Pancrustacea
- Class: Insecta
- Order: Lepidoptera
- Family: Nepticulidae
- Genus: Pectinivalva
- Species: P. commoni

Binomial name
- Pectinivalva commoni Scoble, 1983

Species of moth

Pectinivalva commoni is a moth of the family Nepticulidae. It is found along the south-western coast of Western Australia.

The wingspan is about 5.3 mm for males and 5.3-5.6 mm for females.

The larvae feed on a Eucalyptus species, possibly Eucalyptus delegatensis. They mine the leaves of their host plant. The larval mines were collected in September and adults emerged during the following February.
