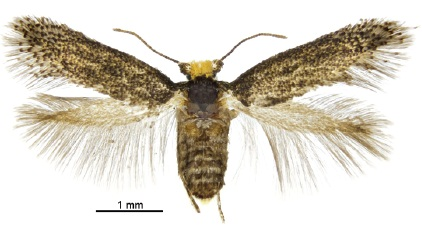
- Female
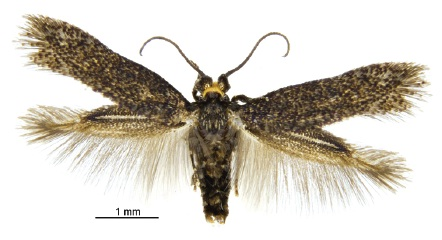
- Male

Scientific classification
- Domain: Eukaryota
- Kingdom: Animalia
- Phylum: Arthropoda
- Class: Insecta
- Order: Lepidoptera
- Family: Nepticulidae
- Genus: Pectinivalva
- Species: P. mystaconota

Binomial name
- Pectinivalva mystaconota Hoare, 2013

= Pectinivalva mystaconota =

Species of moth

Pectinivalva mystaconota is a moth of the family Nepticulidae. It is known from scattered localities in eastern Australia from Wellington, New South Wales south to Mount Nelson, Hobart, Tasmania.

== Description ==
The wingspan is 5.8-7.6 mm for males and 7.5-8.0 mm for females. The thorax and forewings are blackish fuscous and weakly shining. The hindwings are clothed in dark brown scales with iridescent reflections.

== Etymology ==
The specific name is derived from the Greek mystax (meaning moustache) and notos (meaning back) and refers to the tuft of hair-scales on T5 in the male.
