= Pectinivalva primigena =

Scientific classification
- Kingdom: Animalia
- Phylum: Arthropoda
- Class: Insecta
- Order: Lepidoptera
- Family: Nepticulidae
- Genus: Pectinivalva
- Species: P. primigena

Binomial name
- Pectinivalva primigena (Meyrick, 1906)

Synonyms
- Nepticula primigena Meyrick, 1906

Species of moth

Pectinivalva primigena is a moth of the family Nepticulidae. It is found along the south-eastern coast of New South Wales, Australia.

The wingspan is about 4.3 mm for females.
