= Stigmella symmora =

Scientific classification
- Kingdom: Animalia
- Phylum: Arthropoda
- Class: Insecta
- Order: Lepidoptera
- Family: Nepticulidae
- Genus: Stigmella
- Species: S. symmora

Binomial name
- Stigmella symmora (Meyrick, 1906)

Synonyms
- Nepticula symmora Meyrick, 1906

Species of moth

Stigmella symmora is a moth of the family Nepticulidae. It is only known from the southern Gulf coast of South Australia.

The wingspan is 5.2–5.7 mm for males and 5–6 mm for females.

The larvae probably feed on Dodonaea viscosa. They mine the leaves of their host plant.
