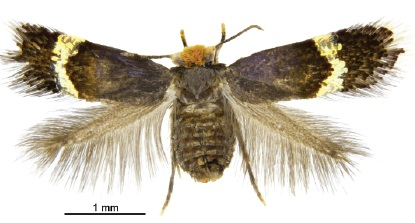
- Female
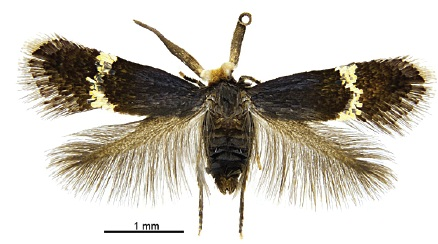
- Male

Scientific classification
- Domain: Eukaryota
- Kingdom: Animalia
- Phylum: Arthropoda
- Class: Insecta
- Order: Lepidoptera
- Family: Nepticulidae
- Genus: Pectinivalva
- Species: P. minotaurus

Binomial name
- Pectinivalva minotaurus Hoare, 2013

= Pectinivalva minotaurus =

Species of moth

Pectinivalva minotaurus is a moth of the family Nepticulidae. It is found in southern Queensland.

The wingspan is 4.7–5.5 mm for males and 4.7–5.8 mm for females. Half of the forewings is dark fuscous with bluish and purplish reflections, beyond this, they are dark fuscous with bronzy reflections. There is a shining pale golden fascia at 2/3. The apex of the wing has purplish reflections at the base of the cilia. The hindwings are grey.

The larvae feed on Lophostemon confertus and Lophostemon suaveolens. They mine the leaves of their host plant. The mine starts as a very long narrow gallery with black linear frass, leaving narrow clear margins. It broadens rather abruptly into an irregular wide gallery or elongate blotch, sometimes with gallery parts, with a central line of black frass or (in the case of the blotch) frass concentrated on one or both sides. The exit-hole is located on the underside and has the form of an almost circular hole. Pupation takes place in a dark reddish brown cocoon.

== Etymology ==
The species is named after the Minotaur and refers to the extraordinarily expanded and flattened male antennae, which are likened to the Minotaur's horns.

== Gallery ==
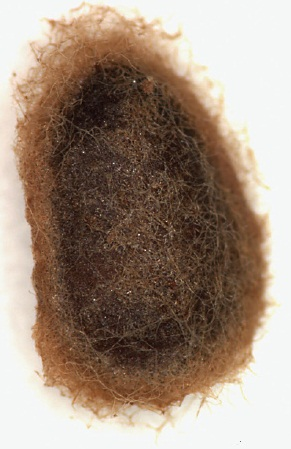
Cocoon

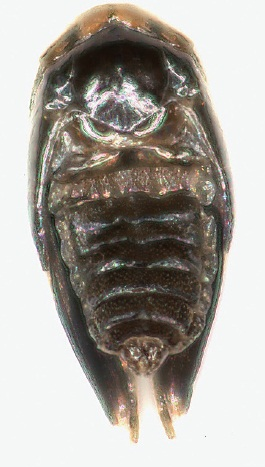
Male pupa, dorsal view

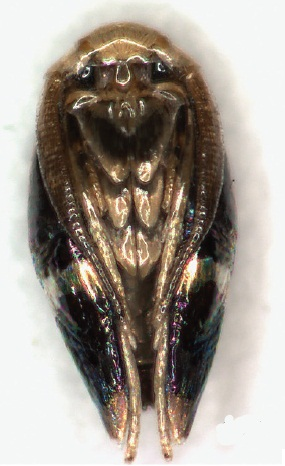
Male pupa, ventral view

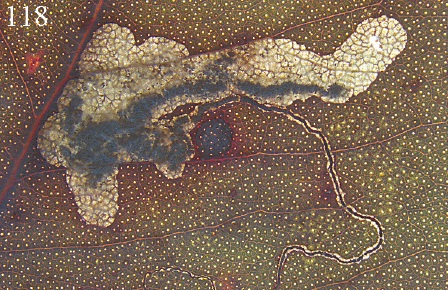
Mine
