= Syzygium acuminatissimum =

Conservation status
- Least Concern (IUCN 3.1)

Scientific classification
- Kingdom: Plantae
- Clade: Tracheophytes
- Clade: Angiosperms
- Clade: Eudicots
- Clade: Rosids
- Order: Myrtales
- Family: Myrtaceae
- Genus: Syzygium
- Species: S. acuminatissimum

Binomial name
- Syzygium acuminatissimum (Blume) DC.

Synonyms
- List: Acmena acuminatissima (Blume) Merr. & L.M.Perry; Eugenia acuminatissima (Blume) Kurz; Jambosa acuminatissima (Blume) Hassk.; Myrtus acuminatissima Blume; Acmena dielsii Merr. & L.M.Perry; Acmena laevifolia (Ridl.) Merr. & L.M.Perry; Acmena polyantha (K.Schum. & Lauterb.) Merr. & L.M.Perry; Eugenia attenuatifolia Merr.; Eugenia cumingiana S.Vidal; Eugenia cuspidato-obovata Hayata; Eugenia eucaudata Elmer ex Merr.; Eugenia gardneri Fern.-Vill.; Eugenia laevifolia Ridl.; Eugenia subdecurrens (Miq.) Merr. & Chun; Syzygium cumingianum (Vidal) Gibbs; Syzygium cuspidato-obovatum (Hayata) Mori; Syzygium subdecurrens Miq.; Xenodendron polyanthum K.Schum. & Lauterb.

Species of flowering plant

Syzygium acuminatissimum, also known as binoloan, lahi-lahi, or xiao pu tao, is a species of plant in the family Myrtaceae. It is a small canopy tree native to southeast China and much of tropical Asia.

== Description ==
Fruit

Syzygium acuminatissimum can grow up to 20 m (66 ft) tall. It has pale or reddish brown bark and grows white flowers.

Its fruit is round, about 1.5 cm (0.6 in) in diameter, and is single-seeded. When ripe, it may be pinkish or dark purple. It is edible.

The leaves are notably pointed, but can be lanceolate, ovate, or elliptic. They are simple and in opposite pairs.

== Taxonomy ==
The species was first described as Myrtus acuminatissima by Carl Ludwig Blume in 1826. In 1828 Augustin Pyramus de Candolle placed the species in genus Syzygium as S. acuminatissimum. Its specific epithet (acuminatissimum) comes from Latin meaning "very pointed", referring to the shape of its leaves.

== Distribution and habitat ==
Syzygium acuminatissimum grows in evergreen forests between 900 and 1,300 m (3,000 and 4,300 ft) above sea level.

== Uses ==
Syzygium acuminatissimum's leaves may be used for mud-dyeing thread. It is also sometimes used as timber.
