= Roscidotoga callicomae =

Scientific classification
- Domain: Eukaryota
- Kingdom: Animalia
- Phylum: Arthropoda
- Class: Insecta
- Order: Lepidoptera
- Family: Nepticulidae
- Genus: Roscidotoga
- Species: R. callicomae

Binomial name
- Roscidotoga callicomae Hoare, 2000

Species of moth

Roscidotoga callicomae is a moth of the family Nepticulidae. It is found along the south-eastern coast of New South Wales and in Queensland.

The larvae feed on Callicoma serratifolia. They mine the leaves of their host plant.
