= Pectinivalva funeralis =

Scientific classification
- Kingdom: Animalia
- Phylum: Arthropoda
- Class: Insecta
- Order: Lepidoptera
- Family: Nepticulidae
- Genus: Pectinivalva
- Species: P. funeralis

Binomial name
- Pectinivalva funeralis (Meyrick, 1906)

Synonyms
- Nepticula funeralis Meyrick, 1906

Species of moth

Pectinivalva funeralis is a moth of the family Nepticulidae. It is found along the southeastern coast of New South Wales.

The wingspan is 5-5.2 mm for males.

The host plant is unknown, but probably a Myrtaceae species. They probably mine the leaves of their host plant.
