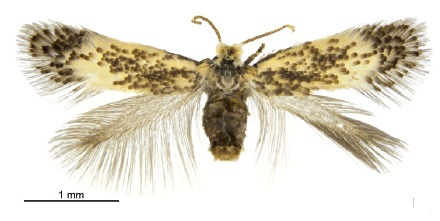
- Female
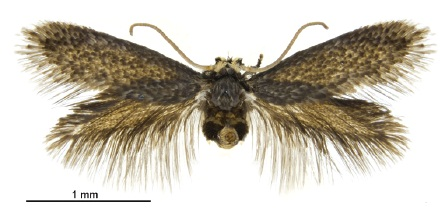
- Male

Scientific classification
- Domain: Eukaryota
- Kingdom: Animalia
- Phylum: Arthropoda
- Class: Insecta
- Order: Lepidoptera
- Family: Nepticulidae
- Genus: Pectinivalva
- Species: P. scotodes

Binomial name
- Pectinivalva scotodes Hoare, 2013

= Pectinivalva scotodes =

Species of moth

Pectinivalva scotodes is a moth of the family Nepticulidae. It is found in New South Wales and southern Queensland.

The wingspan is 5.2–5.7 mm for males and 5.0–5.2 mm for females. In males, the thorax and forewings are entirely blackish brown with a row of long blackish androconial scales projecting from the dorsum. The hindwings are rather broad, dark brown and have a small narrow androconial pocket basally. Females have a paler thorax and forewings. These are yellowish, overlain more or less extensively with brownish fuscous scales. The hindwings are grey and narrower than in males.

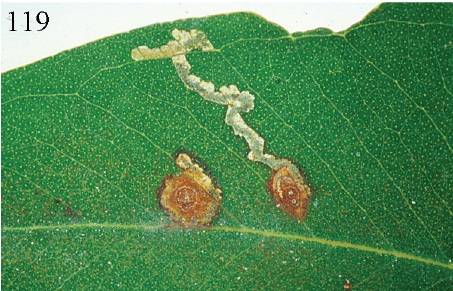
Mine

The larvae feed on Eucalyptus pilularis, Eucalyptus carnea, Eucalyptus acmenoides and probably Eucalyptus saligna. They mine the leaves of their host plant. The mine starts as a tight spiral around the egg, causing a raised red-brown spot on the leaf. It later broadens into a more or less contorted linear gallery with black frass, leaving narrow clear margins. The exit-hole is located on the leaf underside and has the form of a crescentic hole. Several mines may be found in a single leaf. Pupation takes place in a reddish-brown cocoon.

== Etymology ==
The specific name is derived from the Greek skotodes (meaning either dark or dizzy) and refers to both the blackish coloration of the adult male moth, and to the habit of the young larvae, which mine in tight circles.
