= Pectinivalva warburtonensis =

Scientific classification
- Kingdom: Animalia
- Phylum: Arthropoda
- Class: Insecta
- Order: Lepidoptera
- Family: Nepticulidae
- Genus: Pectinivalva
- Species: P. warburtonensis

Binomial name
- Pectinivalva warburtonensis (Wilson, 1939)

Synonyms
- Nepticula warburtonensis Wilson, 1939

Species of moth

Pectinivalva warburtonensis is a moth of the family Nepticulidae. It is found on the Warburton Ranges in Western Australia.

The wingspan is about 5.5 mm for males and females.

The host plant is unknown, but probably a Myrtaceae species. They probably mine the leaves of their host plant.
