= Pectinivalva trepida =

Scientific classification
- Kingdom: Animalia
- Phylum: Arthropoda
- Class: Insecta
- Order: Lepidoptera
- Family: Nepticulidae
- Genus: Pectinivalva
- Species: P. trepida

Binomial name
- Pectinivalva trepida (Meyrick, 1906)

Synonyms
- Nepticula trepida Meyrick, 1906

Species of moth

Pectinivalva trepida is a moth of the family Nepticulidae. It is found along the south-eastern coast of Victoria.

The wingspan is 4.4–4.8 mm for males.

The host plant is unknown, but probably a Myrtaceae species. They probably mine the leaves of their host plant.
