= Pectinivalva endocapna =

Scientific classification
- Kingdom: Animalia
- Phylum: Arthropoda
- Class: Insecta
- Order: Lepidoptera
- Family: Nepticulidae
- Genus: Pectinivalva
- Species: P. endocapna

Binomial name
- Pectinivalva endocapna (Meyrick, 1906)

Synonyms
- Nepticula endocapna Meyrick, 1906

Species of moth

Pectinivalva endocapna is a moth of the family Nepticulidae. It is found along the south-western coast of Western Australia.

The wingspan is 4.7–5.7 mm for males and about 5.5 mm for females.

The larvae probably feed on Eucalyptus species. They probably mine the leaves of their host plant.
