= Pectinivalva caenodora =

Scientific classification
- Kingdom: Animalia
- Phylum: Arthropoda
- Class: Insecta
- Order: Lepidoptera
- Family: Nepticulidae
- Genus: Pectinivalva
- Species: P. caenodora

Binomial name
- Pectinivalva caenodora (Meyrick, 1906)

Synonyms
- Nepticula caenodora Meyrick, 1906

Species of moth

Pectinivalva caenodora is a moth of the family Nepticulidae. It is found along the south-eastern coast of New South Wales.

The wingspan is about 6.4 mm for males and 5.8–6.5 mm for females.

The larvae possibly feed on Eucalyptus. They probably mine the leaves of their host plant.
