= Pectinivalva melanotis =

Scientific classification
- Kingdom: Animalia
- Phylum: Arthropoda
- Class: Insecta
- Order: Lepidoptera
- Family: Nepticulidae
- Genus: Pectinivalva
- Species: P. melanotis

Binomial name
- Pectinivalva melanotis (Meyrick, 1906)

Synonyms
- Nepticula melanotis Meyrick, 1906

Species of moth

Pectinivalva melanotis is a moth of the family Nepticulidae. It is found along the south-eastern coast of New South Wales.

The wingspan is 5-6.6 mm for males.

The larvae probably feed on Eucalyptus species. They probably mine the leaves of their host plant.
