= Roscidotoga lamingtonia =

Scientific classification
- Domain: Eukaryota
- Kingdom: Animalia
- Phylum: Arthropoda
- Class: Insecta
- Order: Lepidoptera
- Family: Nepticulidae
- Genus: Roscidotoga
- Species: R. lamingtonia

Binomial name
- Roscidotoga lamingtonia Van Nieukerken, Van den Berg & Hoare, 2011

Species of moth

Roscidotoga lamingtonia is a moth of the family Nepticulidae. It is found in southern Queensland and northern New South Wales (the McPherson Range).

The wingspan is 5–5.1 mm for males.

The larvae feed on Sloanea woollsii. They mine the leaves of their host plant.

== Etymology ==
The species name is derived from the type locality, Lamington National Park.
