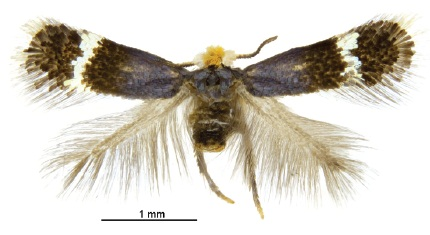
- Female
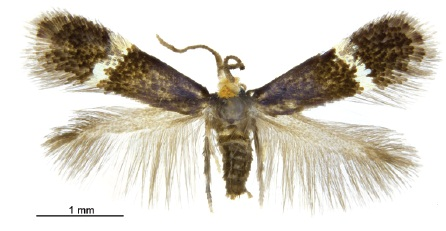
- Male

Scientific classification
- Domain: Eukaryota
- Kingdom: Animalia
- Phylum: Arthropoda
- Class: Insecta
- Order: Lepidoptera
- Family: Nepticulidae
- Genus: Pectinivalva
- Species: P. brevipalpa

Binomial name
- Pectinivalva brevipalpa Hoare, 2013

= Pectinivalva brevipalpa =

Species of moth

Pectinivalva brevipalpa is a moth of the family Nepticulidae. It is found in New South Wales.

The wingspan is 4.3–5.9 mm for males and 4.3–5.2 mm for females. Two-thirds of the forewings is dark fuscous with purplish reflections, there is a shining silver to pale golden fascia at 2/3. The apex of the wing is dark fuscous without reflections. The hindwings are grey.

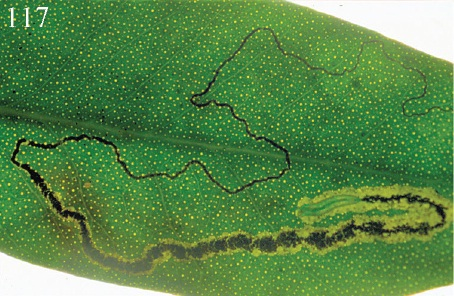
Mine

The larvae feed on Tristaniopsis collina. They mine the leaves of their host plant. The mine starts as a very long narrow gallery either filled with greenish frass or with black linear frass. It broadens rather abruptly into a gallery with a central line of black frass. The exit-hole is located on the upperside and has the form of a semicircular slit. Pupation takes place in a reddish-brown cocoon.

== Etymology ==
The specific name is derived from the Latin brevis (meaning short) and palpus (meaning the sensitive palm of the hand) and refers to the reduced, 2-segmented labial palpi of the adult male.
