= Stigmella leucargyra =

Scientific classification
- Kingdom: Animalia
- Phylum: Arthropoda
- Class: Insecta
- Order: Lepidoptera
- Family: Nepticulidae
- Genus: Stigmella
- Species: S. leucargyra

Binomial name
- Stigmella leucargyra (Meyrick, 1906)

Synonyms
- Nepticula leucargyra Meyrick, 1906

Species of moth

Stigmella leucargyra is a moth of the family Nepticulidae. It is only known from the south-eastern coast of New South Wales, Australia.

The wingspan is about 3.7 mm for males and 4-4.2 mm for females.

The larvae feed on Correa reflexa. They mine the leaves of their host plant.

Larvae where found in July and August. Adults emerged in early September.
