= Roscidotoga eucryphiae =

Scientific classification
- Domain: Eukaryota
- Kingdom: Animalia
- Phylum: Arthropoda
- Class: Insecta
- Order: Lepidoptera
- Family: Nepticulidae
- Genus: Roscidotoga
- Species: R. eucryphiae

Binomial name
- Roscidotoga eucryphiae Hoare, 2000

Species of moth

Roscidotoga eucryphiae is a moth of the family Nepticulidae. It is found in Tasmania.

The larvae feed on Eucryphia lucida. They mine the leaves of their host plant.
