= Pectinivalva planetis =

Scientific classification
- Kingdom: Animalia
- Phylum: Arthropoda
- Class: Insecta
- Order: Lepidoptera
- Family: Nepticulidae
- Genus: Pectinivalva
- Species: P. planetis

Binomial name
- Pectinivalva planetis (Meyrick, 1906)

Synonyms
- Nepticula planetis Meyrick, 1906

Species of moth

Pectinivalva planetis is a moth of the family Nepticulidae. It is found along the southeastern coast of New South Wales.

The wingspan is about 5.5 mm for females.

The host plant is unknown, but probably a Myrtaceae species. They probably mine the leaves of their host plant.
