= Stigmella phyllanthina =

Scientific classification
- Kingdom: Animalia
- Phylum: Arthropoda
- Class: Insecta
- Order: Lepidoptera
- Family: Nepticulidae
- Genus: Stigmella
- Species: S. phyllanthina

Binomial name
- Stigmella phyllanthina (Meyrick, 1906)

Synonyms
- Nepticula phyllanthina Meyrick, 1906

Species of moth

Stigmella phyllanthina is a moth of the family Nepticulidae. It is only known from the south-eastern coast of New South Wales, Australia.

The wingspan is 3.8-4.6 mm for males.

The larvae feed on Glochidion ferdinandi. They mine the leaves of their host plant.
