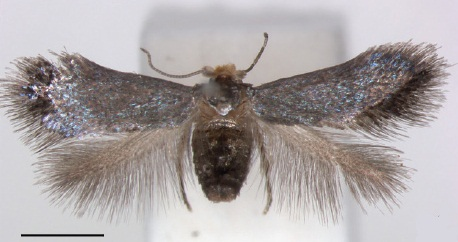
- Female
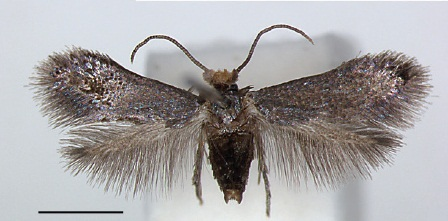
- Male

Scientific classification
- Domain: Eukaryota
- Kingdom: Animalia
- Phylum: Arthropoda
- Class: Insecta
- Order: Lepidoptera
- Family: Nepticulidae
- Genus: Pectinivalva
- Species: P. quintiniae

Binomial name
- Pectinivalva quintiniae Hoare & Van Nieukerken, 2013

= Pectinivalva quintiniae =

Species of moth

Pectinivalva quintiniae is a moth of the family Nepticulidae. It is found in northern New South Wales (Border Ranges National Park) and southern Queensland (Lamington National Park).

The wingspan is 4.7–4.8 mm for males and 5.0–5.8 mm for females. The thorax, tegulae and forewings are uniform shining fuscous with strong blue to violet reflections. The hindwings are grey.

The larvae feed on Quintinia verdonii. They mine the leaves of their host plant. The mine has the form of a long, meandering gallery, with central line of blackish frass taking up most of mine width except near the end where the gallery broadens and the frass takes up only half of the width. The exit-hole is located on the underside and has the form of a semicircular to oval hole. Pupation takes place in a reddish-brown cocoon.

== Etymology ==
The specific name is derived from the hostplant genus.

== Gallery ==
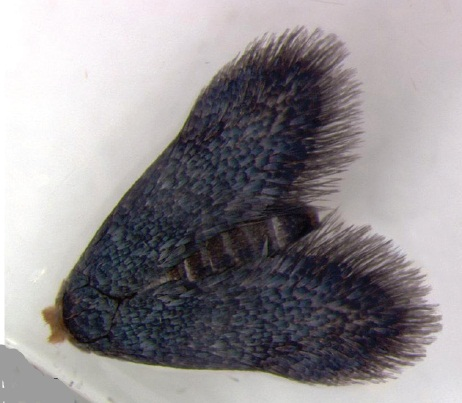
Living male

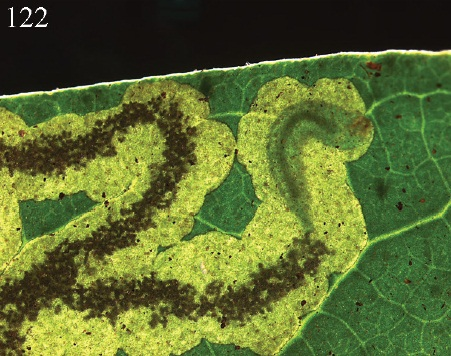
Mine

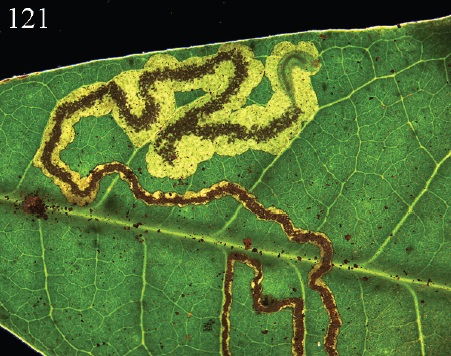
Mine
