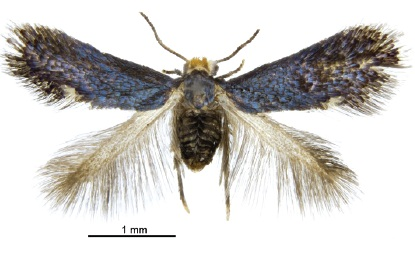
- Female
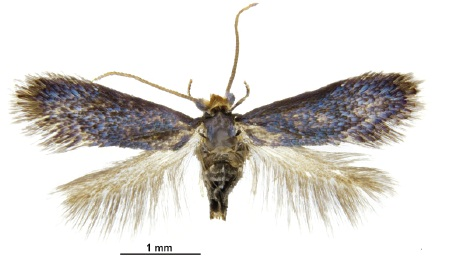
- Male

Scientific classification
- Domain: Eukaryota
- Kingdom: Animalia
- Phylum: Arthropoda
- Class: Insecta
- Order: Lepidoptera
- Family: Nepticulidae
- Genus: Pectinivalva
- Species: P. acmenae

Binomial name
- Pectinivalva acmenae Hoare, 2013

= Pectinivalva acmenae =

Species of moth

Pectinivalva acmenae is a moth of the family Nepticulidae. It is found in New South Wales.

The wingspan is 4.5–5.5 mm for males and 5.2–5.6 mm for females. The thorax, tegulae and forewings are uniform shining dark grey with strong blue reflections. There is an inconspicuous tornal spot consisting of a few white scales. The hindwings are pale grey.

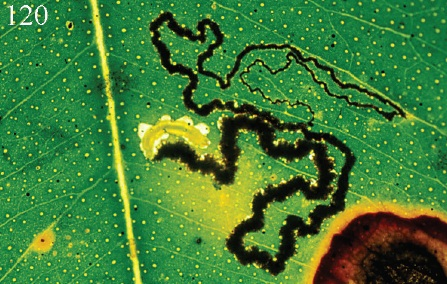
Mine

The larvae feed on Syzygium smithii. They mine the leaves of their host plant. The mine has the form of a long, very narrow contorted gallery, filled with brown frass apart from irregular crenulations along the mine edge. The exit-hole is located on the underside and has the form of a semicircular hole. Pupation takes place in a reddish-brown cocoon.

== Etymology ==
The specific name is derived from the former host-plant genus. Because the moth is referred to under this manuscript name in the first author's unpublished thesis, the authors have chosen to retain it for consistency, in spite of the change in classification of the host-plant.
