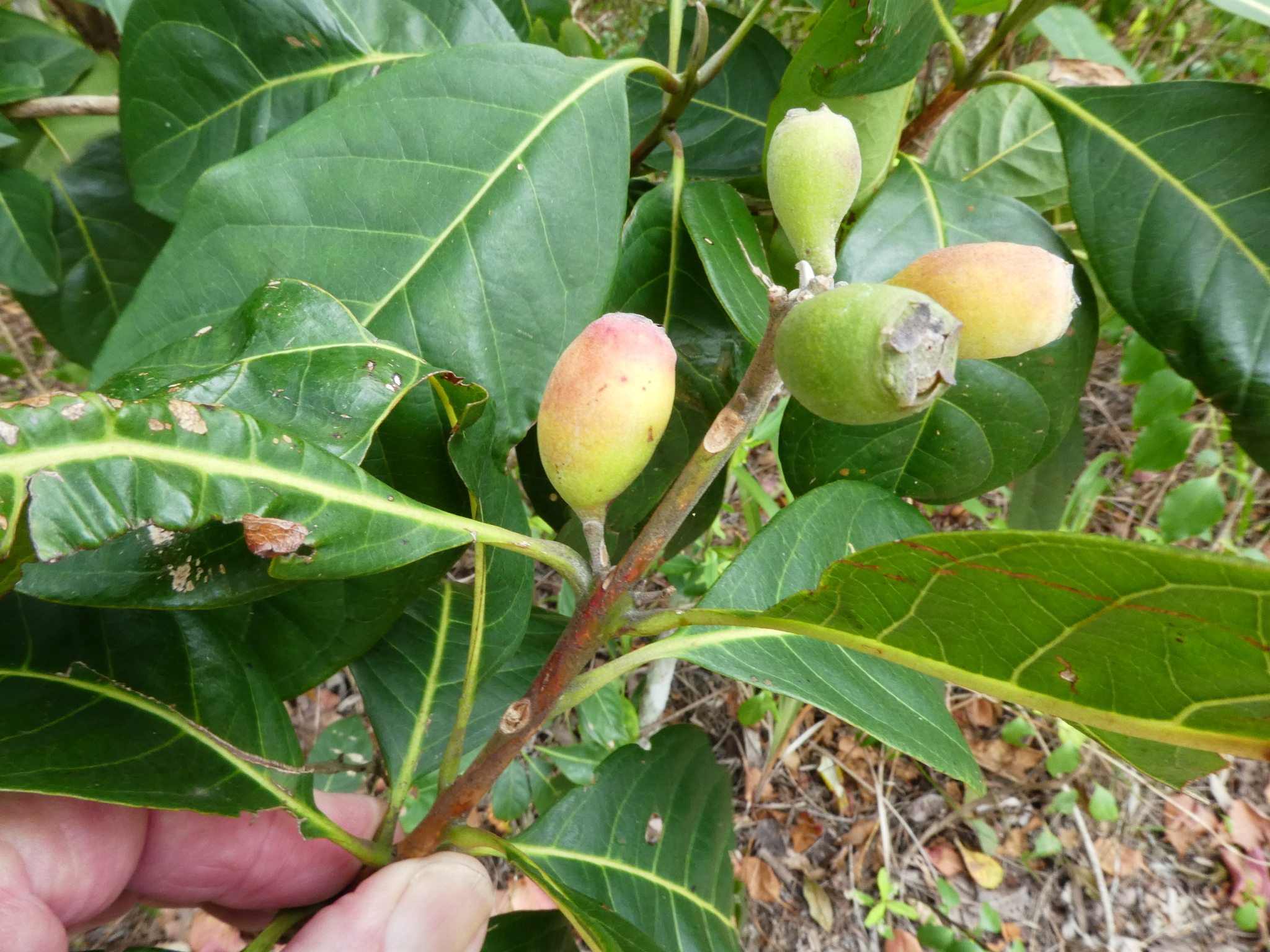
- Fruiting in Cairns, August 2021

Conservation status
- Least Concern (IUCN 3.1)

Scientific classification
- Kingdom: Plantae
- Clade: Tracheophytes
- Clade: Angiosperms
- Clade: Eudicots
- Clade: Rosids
- Order: Myrtales
- Family: Myrtaceae
- Genus: Rhodomyrtus
- Species: R. macrocarpa

Binomial name
- Rhodomyrtus macrocarpa Benth.
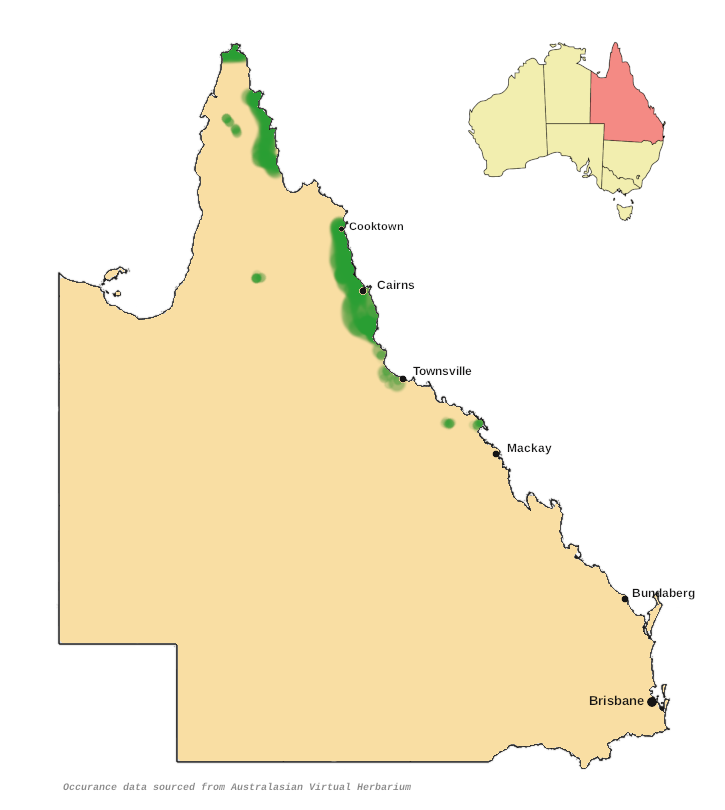

= Rhodomyrtus macrocarpa =

Species of flowering plant

Rhodomyrtus macrocarpa, commonly known as finger cherry, Cooktown loquat, or wannakai, is a species of plant in the family Myrtaceae native to New Guinea, the Aru Islands, and the Australian state of Queensland. Eating the fruits is reputed to cause blindness.

== Description ==
Rhodomyrtus macrocarpa is a shrub or small tree growing to about 8 m (26 ft) tall with rough pale brown bark. The growing tips are covered in fine pale grey hairs. The leaves are elliptic, hairless and simple (i.e. not divided) and arranged in opposite pairs. They measure up to 25 cm (9.8 in) long by 11 cm (4.3 in) wide and are held on petioles about 10–20 mm (0.4–0.8 in) long.

Flowers are produced in the upper leaf axils in clusters of 1–3; they are white or pink and about 2.5 cm (1 in) across, with numerous stamens. The fruit is a pink or red cylindrical botanical berry up to 6 cm (2.4 in) long and 2.5 cm (1 in) wide, containing from one to several flattened, pale brown seeds about 10 mm (0.4 in) diameter.

== Taxonomy ==
This species was first described by the English botanist George Bentham in 1866, based on material collected from Albany Island at the tip of Cape York Peninsula, and from Rockingham Bay. The description was published in volume 3 of Flora Australiensis.

== Conservation ==
As of November 2024, this species has been assessed to be of least concern by the International Union for Conservation of Nature (IUCN) and by the Queensland Government under its Nature Conservation Act. The IUCN's report states that the species has a large range no specific threats have been identified, although habitat loss due to urbanisation in Australia is a minor concern.

== Cultivation ==
The plant produces showy flowers and colourful fruit, which would normally earmark it for cultivation as an ornamental, however, this is discouraged due to the potential toxicity of the fruit.

== Toxicity ==
While it is known that the fruit of this species were eaten by Indigenous Australians without ill-effect, there has been a number of well documented incidents involving European settlers eating the fruit which resulted in them becoming permanently blind. The cases usually involved children, and the ingestion of large numbers of fruit. It has been suggested that unripe fruit or a fungal infection in the fruit may be involved, but as of November 2024 no pathogen or constituent compound of the fruit has been identified as being responsible for the loss of sight, and the cause remains a mystery.

== Gallery ==
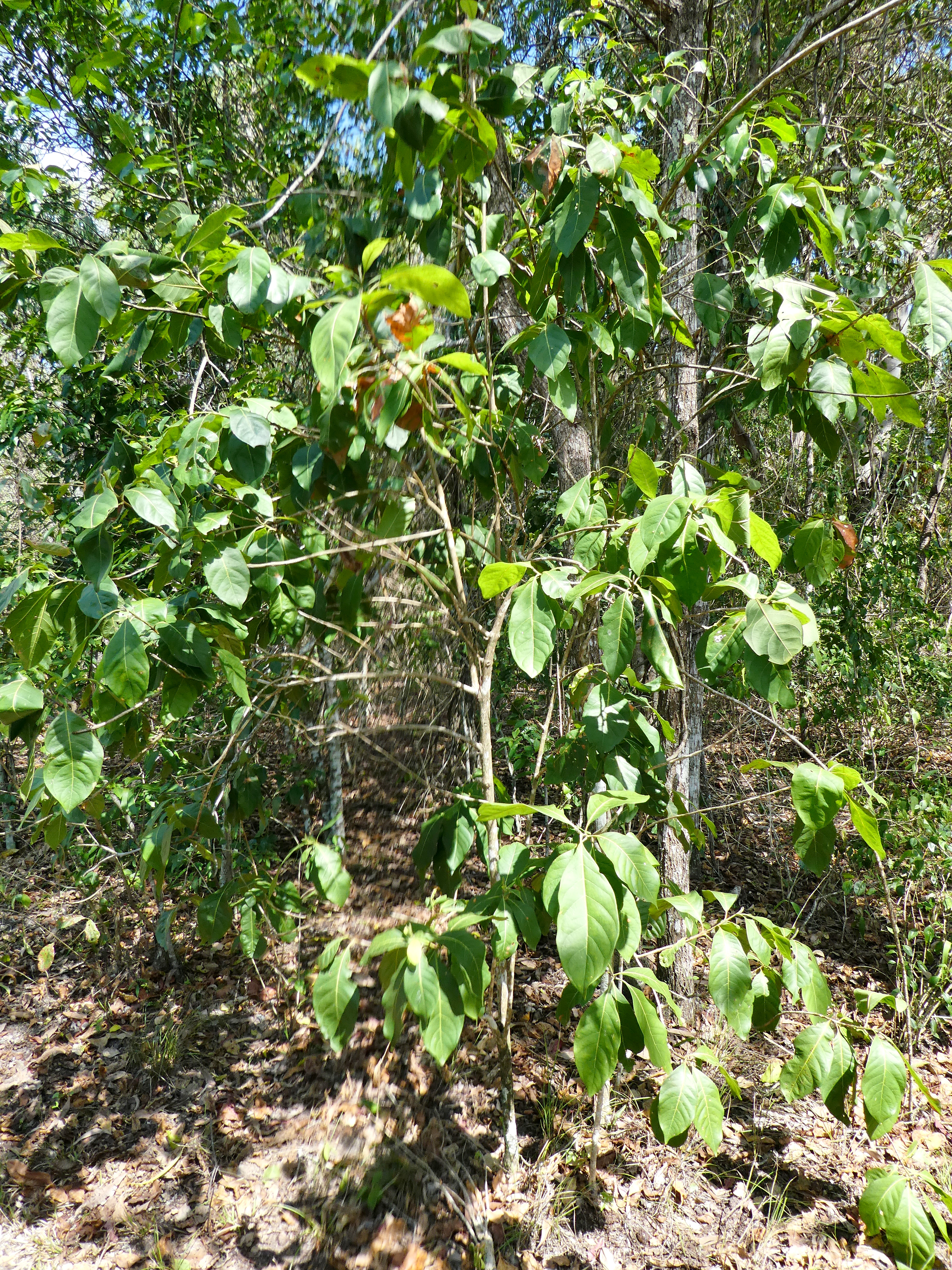
Habit

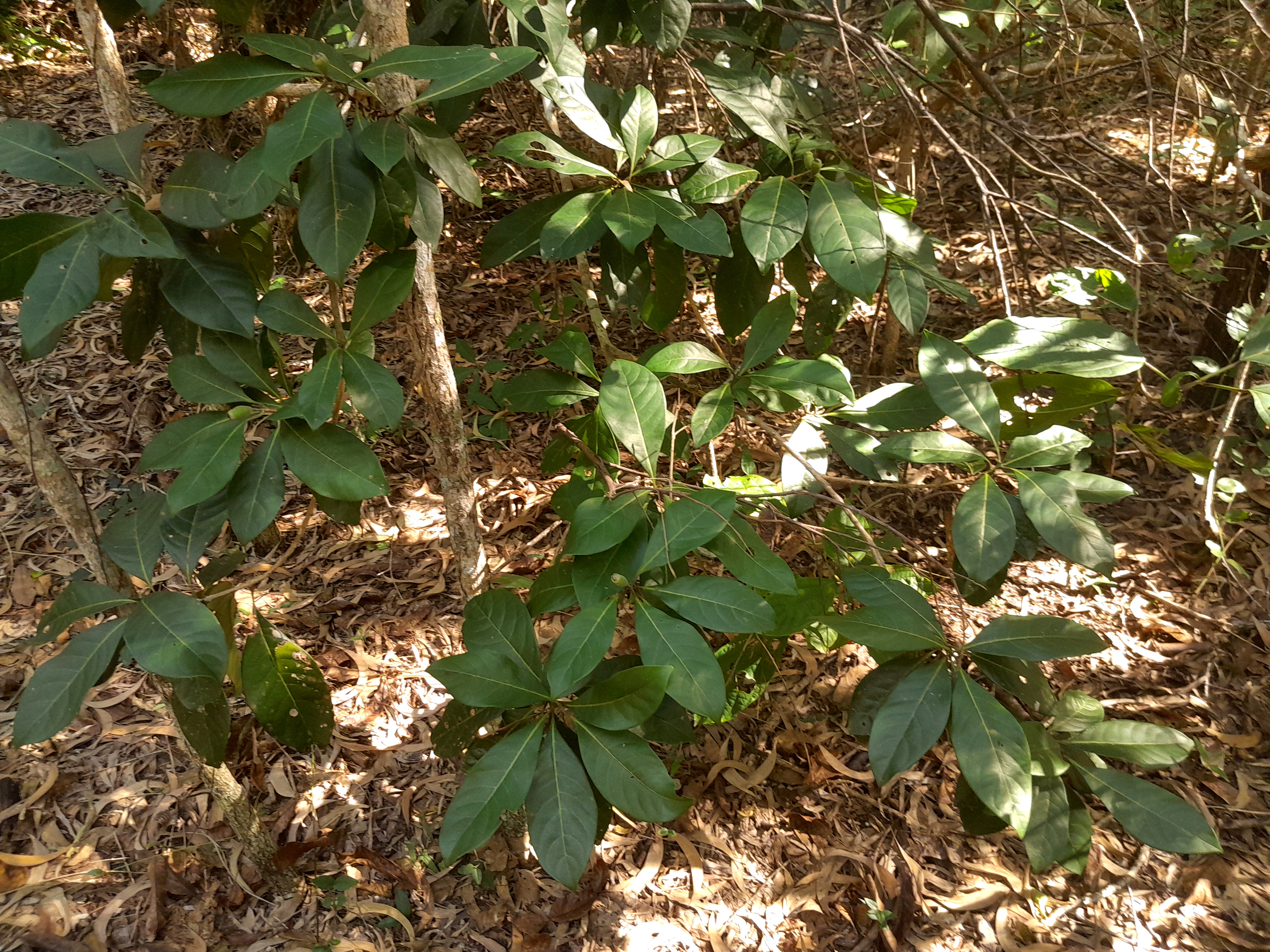
Foliage

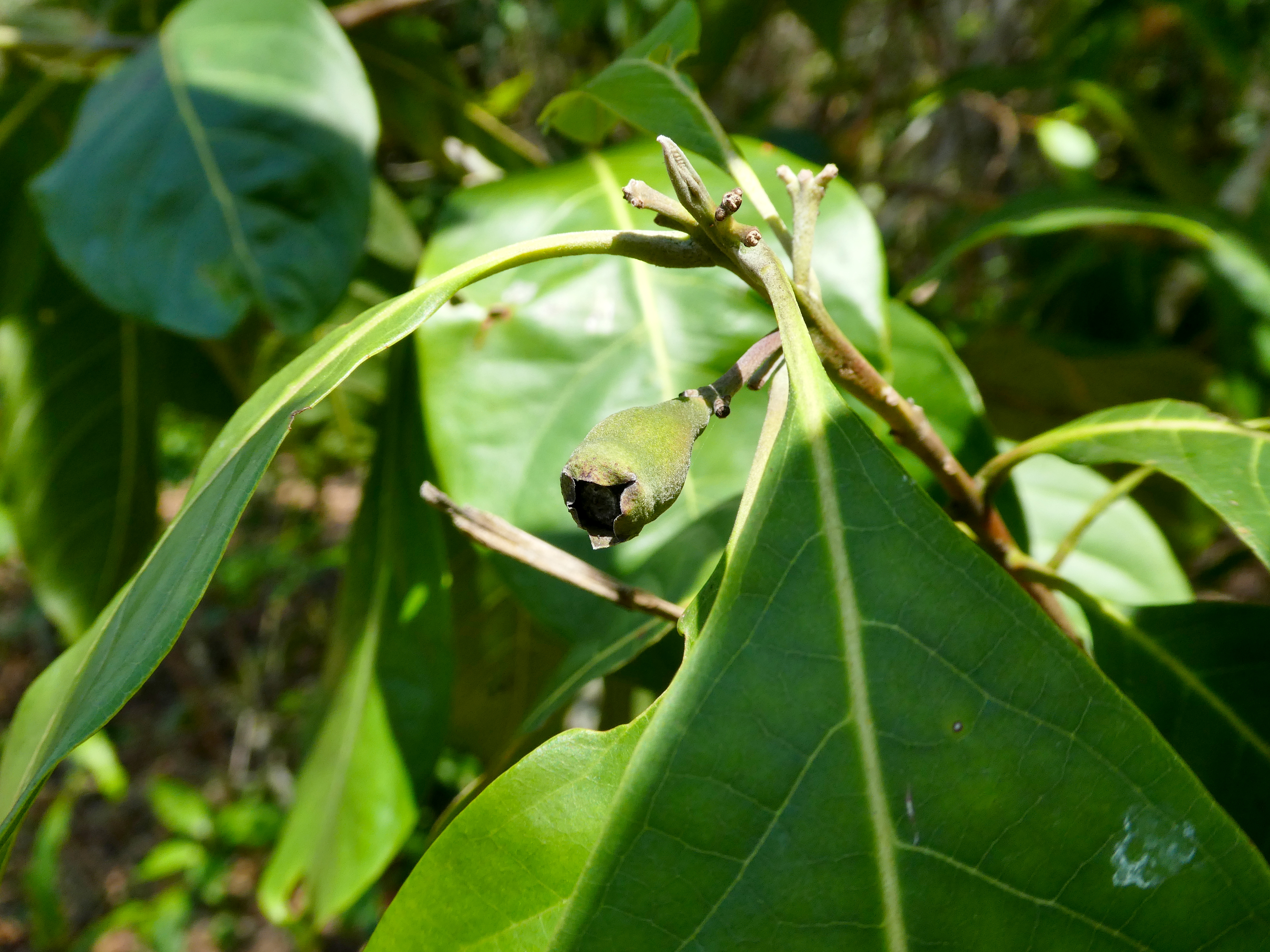
Growing tip and immature fruit

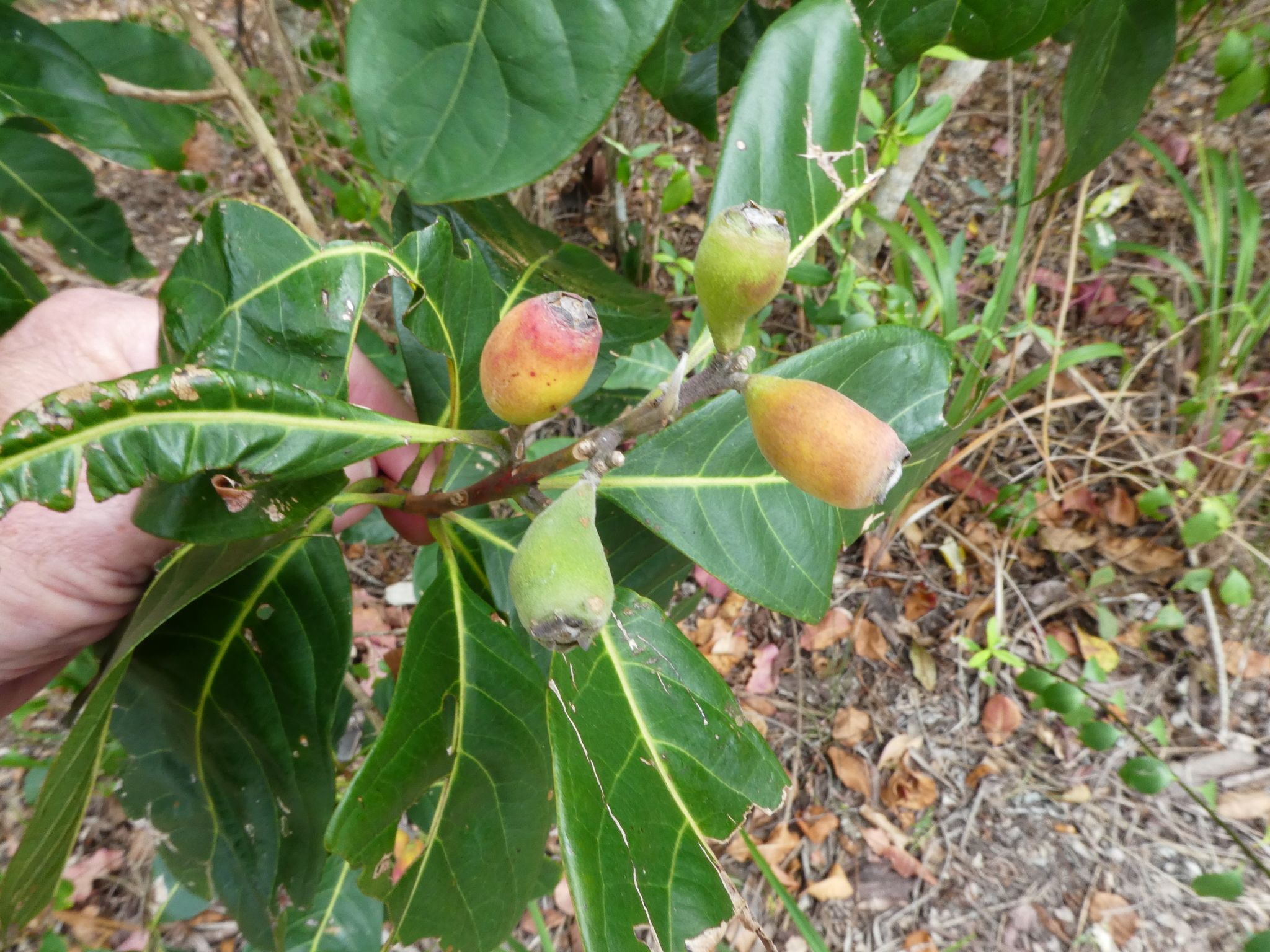
Ripening fruit

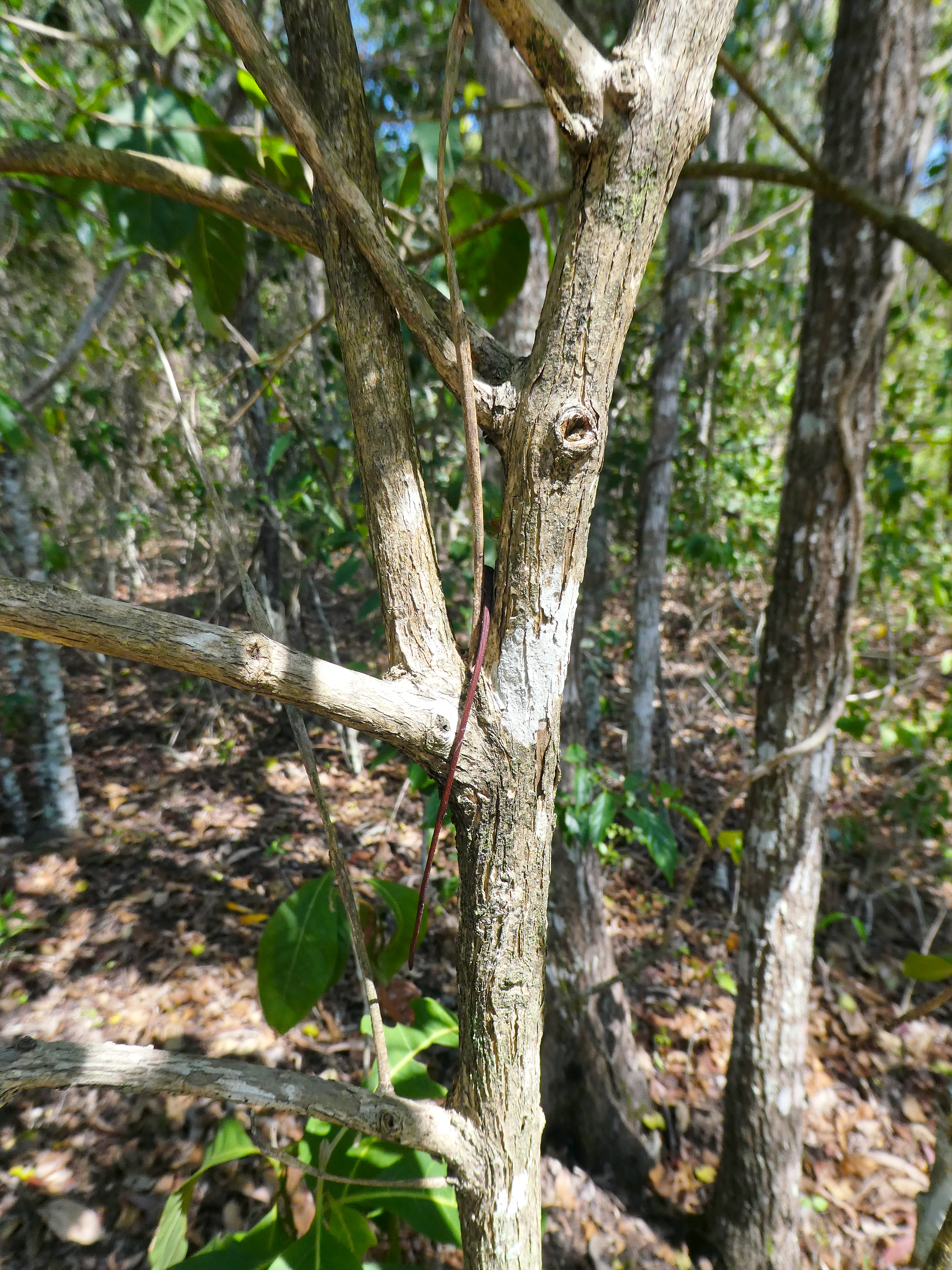
Trunk
