= Bucculatrix brunnella =

Scientific classification
- Kingdom: Animalia
- Phylum: Arthropoda
- Clade: Pancrustacea
- Class: Insecta
- Order: Lepidoptera
- Family: Bucculatricidae
- Genus: Bucculatrix
- Species: B. brunnella

Binomial name
- Bucculatrix brunnella Tokár & Laštůvka, 2018

Species of moth

Bucculatrix brunnella is a moth species in the family Bucculatricidae. It was described by Zdenko Tokár and Aleš Laštůvka in 2018 and is found on Sicily and Sardinia. The specific epithet is a reference to the brown male forewing coloring.

== Description ==
Male adults have ochrous brown forewings, mostly monochrome with only slight, scattered patterning, and a wingspan of 7–7.5 mm. Female adults are smaller, with a wingspan of 6.5 mm, and forewings that are lighter in colour and more noticeably patterned.

Male genitalia are distinctive from other Bucculatrix species. Female genitalia closely resemble those of Bucculatrix mehadiensis, from which it can be distinguished by external appearance.
