= Bucculatrix tetradymiae =

Scientific classification
- Kingdom: Animalia
- Phylum: Arthropoda
- Clade: Pancrustacea
- Class: Insecta
- Order: Lepidoptera
- Family: Bucculatricidae
- Genus: Bucculatrix
- Species: B. tetradymiae

Binomial name
- Bucculatrix tetradymiae Osborne & Rubinoff, 1997

Species of moth

Bucculatrix tetradymiae is a moth in the family Bucculatricidae. It is found in North America, where it has been recorded from the Mojave Desert in California. It was first described by Kendall H. Osborne and Daniel Z. Rubinoff in 1997.
