= Bucculatrix locuples =

Scientific classification
- Kingdom: Animalia
- Phylum: Arthropoda
- Clade: Pancrustacea
- Class: Insecta
- Order: Lepidoptera
- Family: Bucculatricidae
- Genus: Bucculatrix
- Species: B. locuples

Binomial name
- Bucculatrix locuples Meyrick, 1919

Species of moth

Bucculatrix locuples is a moth in the family Bucculatricidae. It was described in 1919 by Edward Meyrick. It is found in North America, where it has been recorded from Kentucky, Quebec and Ohio.

They mine the leaves of their host plant. The larvae feed on Alnus semdata. Pupation takes place in a bright brown to almost black, hairy cocoon, which is spun on a twig.
