= Bucculatrix ceanothiella =

Scientific classification
- Kingdom: Animalia
- Phylum: Arthropoda
- Clade: Pancrustacea
- Class: Insecta
- Order: Lepidoptera
- Family: Bucculatricidae
- Genus: Bucculatrix
- Species: B. ceanothiella

Binomial name
- Bucculatrix ceanothiella Braun, 1918

Species of moth

Bucculatrix ceanothiella is a moth in the family Bucculatricidae. The species was first described in 1918 by Annette Frances Braun. It is found in North America, where it has been recorded from California.

The wingspan is about 6.5 mm. Adults have been recorded on wing from February to May, in July and from September to October.

The larvae feed on Ceanothus species. They mine the leaves of their host plant. Pupation takes place in a white cocoon.
