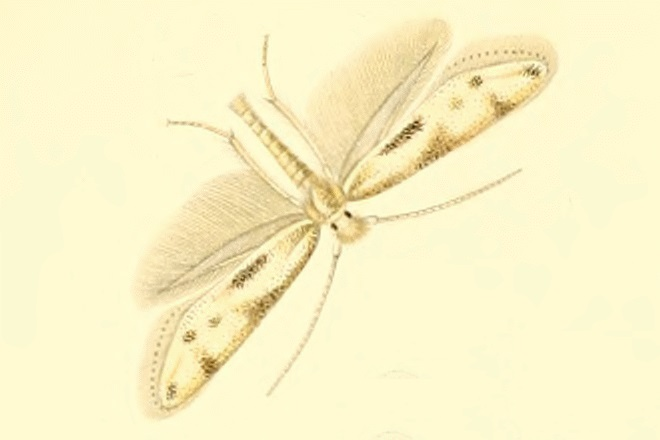

Scientific classification
- Kingdom: Animalia
- Phylum: Arthropoda
- Clade: Pancrustacea
- Class: Insecta
- Order: Lepidoptera
- Family: Bucculatricidae
- Genus: Bucculatrix
- Species: B. lavaterella

Binomial name
- Bucculatrix lavaterella Millière, 1865

= Bucculatrix lavaterella =

Species of moth

Bucculatrix lavaterella is a moth in the family Bucculatricidae. It was described by Pierre Millière in 1865. It is found in France and on Sardinia and Sicily.

== Gallery ==
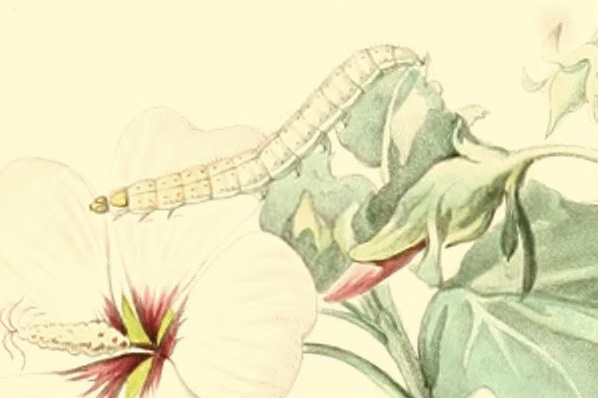
Larva

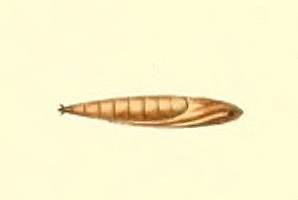
Pupa
