= Bucculatrix galinsogae =

Scientific classification
- Kingdom: Animalia
- Phylum: Arthropoda
- Clade: Pancrustacea
- Class: Insecta
- Order: Lepidoptera
- Family: Bucculatricidae
- Genus: Bucculatrix
- Species: B. galinsogae

Binomial name
- Bucculatrix galinsogae Deschka, 2013

Species of moth

Bucculatrix galinsogae is a moth in the family Bucculatricidae. It is found in Ecuador. The species was described in 2013 by G. Deschka.
