= Bucculatrix ochristrigella =

Scientific classification
- Kingdom: Animalia
- Phylum: Arthropoda
- Clade: Pancrustacea
- Class: Insecta
- Order: Lepidoptera
- Family: Bucculatricidae
- Genus: Bucculatrix
- Species: B. ochristrigella

Binomial name
- Bucculatrix ochristrigella Braun, 1910

Species of moth

Bucculatrix ochristrigella is a species of moth in the family Bucculatricidae. It is found in North America, where it has been recorded from California. It was first described in 1910 by Annette Frances Braun.

The wingspan is 11–12 mm. Adults have been recorded on wing in April.

Larvae have been reared on Madia gracilis.
