= Bucculatrix staintonella =

Scientific classification
- Kingdom: Animalia
- Phylum: Arthropoda
- Clade: Pancrustacea
- Class: Insecta
- Order: Lepidoptera
- Family: Bucculatricidae
- Genus: Bucculatrix
- Species: B. staintonella

Binomial name
- Bucculatrix staintonella Chambers, 1878

Synonyms
- Bucculatrix pertenuis Braun, 1918

Species of moth

Bucculatrix staintonella is a moth in the family Bucculatricidae. It is found in North America, where it has been recorded from Colorado, Florida, Illinois, Indiana, Iowa, Louisiana, Massachusetts, Missouri, New Mexico, South Dakota and West Virginia. The species was described in 1878 by Vactor Tousey Chambers.

The wingspan is 6.5–9 mm. Adults have been recorded on wing in January, from March to April, from June to July and from September to October.

The larvae have been recorded feeding on Populus species.
