= Bucculatrix micropunctata =

Scientific classification
- Kingdom: Animalia
- Phylum: Arthropoda
- Clade: Pancrustacea
- Class: Insecta
- Order: Lepidoptera
- Family: Bucculatricidae
- Genus: Bucculatrix
- Species: B. micropunctata

Binomial name
- Bucculatrix micropunctata Braun, 1963

Species of moth

Bucculatrix micropunctata is a moth in the family Bucculatricidae. It is found in North America, where it has been recorded in California. It was described in 1963 by Annette Frances Braun.
