= Bucculatrix facilis =

Scientific classification
- Kingdom: Animalia
- Phylum: Arthropoda
- Clade: Pancrustacea
- Class: Insecta
- Order: Lepidoptera
- Family: Bucculatricidae
- Genus: Bucculatrix
- Species: B. facilis

Binomial name
- Bucculatrix facilis Meyrick, 1911

Species of moth

Bucculatrix facilis is a moth in the family Bucculatricidae. It was described by Edward Meyrick in 1911. It is found in Namibia and South Africa.
