= Bucculatrix aquila =

Scientific classification
- Kingdom: Animalia
- Phylum: Arthropoda
- Clade: Pancrustacea
- Class: Insecta
- Order: Lepidoptera
- Family: Bucculatricidae
- Genus: Bucculatrix
- Species: B. aquila

Binomial name
- Bucculatrix aquila Seksjaeva, 1992

Species of moth

Bucculatrix aquila is a moth in the family Bucculatricidae. It was described by Svetlana Seksjaeva in 1992. It is found in Russia.
