= Bucculatrix bicolorella =

Scientific classification
- Kingdom: Animalia
- Phylum: Arthropoda
- Clade: Pancrustacea
- Class: Insecta
- Order: Lepidoptera
- Family: Bucculatricidae
- Genus: Bucculatrix
- Species: B. bicolorella

Binomial name
- Bucculatrix bicolorella Chrétien, 1915

Species of moth

Bucculatrix bicolorella is a moth in the family Bucculatricidae. It was described by Pierre Chrétien in 1915. It is found in Italy.

The wingspan is about 6 mm.
