= Bucculatrix melipecta =

Scientific classification
- Kingdom: Animalia
- Phylum: Arthropoda
- Clade: Pancrustacea
- Class: Insecta
- Order: Lepidoptera
- Family: Bucculatricidae
- Genus: Bucculatrix
- Species: B. melipecta

Binomial name
- Bucculatrix melipecta Meyrick, 1914

Species of moth

Bucculatrix melipecta is a moth in the family Bucculatricidae. It was described by Edward Meyrick in 1914. It is found in South Africa.
