= Bucculatrix arnicella =

Scientific classification
- Kingdom: Animalia
- Phylum: Arthropoda
- Clade: Pancrustacea
- Class: Insecta
- Order: Lepidoptera
- Family: Bucculatricidae
- Genus: Bucculatrix
- Species: B. arnicella

Binomial name
- Bucculatrix arnicella Braun, 1925

Species of moth

Bucculatrix arnicella is a species of moth in the family Bucculatricidae. The species was first described in 1925 by Annette Frances Braun. It is found in North America, where it has been recorded from Utah, Montana, Alberta and Wyoming. The habitat consists of open lodgepole pine and Douglas fir forests.

The wingspan is about 8 mm. Adults have been recorded on wing May and from June to August.

The larvae feed on Arnica cordifolia.
