= Bucculatrix seneciensis =

Scientific classification
- Kingdom: Animalia
- Phylum: Arthropoda
- Clade: Pancrustacea
- Class: Insecta
- Order: Lepidoptera
- Family: Bucculatricidae
- Genus: Bucculatrix
- Species: B. seneciensis

Binomial name
- Bucculatrix seneciensis Braun, 1963

Species of moth

Bucculatrix seneciensis is a moth in the family Bucculatricidae. It is found in North America, where it has been recorded from California. It was described by Annette Frances Braun in 1963.

Adults have been recorded on wing in November.

The larvae feed on Senecio species. They probably bore the stem of their host plant.
