= Bucculatrix malivorella =

Scientific classification
- Kingdom: Animalia
- Phylum: Arthropoda
- Clade: Pancrustacea
- Class: Insecta
- Order: Lepidoptera
- Family: Bucculatricidae
- Genus: Bucculatrix
- Species: B. malivorella

Binomial name
- Bucculatrix malivorella Baryshnikova, 2007

Species of moth

Bucculatrix malivorella is a moth in the family Bucculatricidae. It was described in 2007 by Svetlana Vladimirovna Baryshnikova. It is found in Tajikistan.
