= Bucculatrix basifuscella =

Scientific classification
- Kingdom: Animalia
- Phylum: Arthropoda
- Clade: Pancrustacea
- Class: Insecta
- Order: Lepidoptera
- Family: Bucculatricidae
- Genus: Bucculatrix
- Species: B. basifuscella

Binomial name
- Bucculatrix basifuscella Staudinger, 1880

Species of moth

Bucculatrix basifuscella is a moth of the family Bucculatricidae. The species was first described by Otto Staudinger in 1880. It is found in Turkey.
