= Bucculatrix ilecella =

Scientific classification
- Kingdom: Animalia
- Phylum: Arthropoda
- Clade: Pancrustacea
- Class: Insecta
- Order: Lepidoptera
- Family: Bucculatricidae
- Genus: Bucculatrix
- Species: B. ilecella

Binomial name
- Bucculatrix ilecella Busck, 1915

Species of moth

Bucculatrix ilecella is a moth in the family Bucculatricidae. It is found in North America, where it has been recorded from Texas. It was first described by August Busck in 1915.

The wingspan is 4–4.4 mm.
