= Bucculatrix insolita =

Scientific classification
- Kingdom: Animalia
- Phylum: Arthropoda
- Clade: Pancrustacea
- Class: Insecta
- Order: Lepidoptera
- Family: Bucculatricidae
- Genus: Bucculatrix
- Species: B. insolita

Binomial name
- Bucculatrix insolita Braun, 1918

Species of moth

Bucculatrix insolita is a moth in the family Bucculatricidae. It is found in North America, where it has been recorded from California. It was described by Annette Frances Braun in 1918.
