= Bucculatrix transversella =

Scientific classification
- Kingdom: Animalia
- Phylum: Arthropoda
- Clade: Pancrustacea
- Class: Insecta
- Order: Lepidoptera
- Family: Bucculatricidae
- Genus: Bucculatrix
- Species: B. transversella

Binomial name
- Bucculatrix transversella Caradja, 1920

Species of moth

Bucculatrix transversella is a moth in the family Bucculatricidae. It was described by Aristide Caradja in 1920. It is found in Russia.
