= Bucculatrix floccosa =

Scientific classification
- Kingdom: Animalia
- Phylum: Arthropoda
- Clade: Pancrustacea
- Class: Insecta
- Order: Lepidoptera
- Family: Bucculatricidae
- Genus: Bucculatrix
- Species: B. floccosa

Binomial name
- Bucculatrix floccosa Braun, 1923

Species of moth

Bucculatrix floccosa is a moth in the family Bucculatricidae. It is found in North America, where it has been recorded from California and Nevada. It was described by Annette Frances Braun in 1923.
