= Bucculatrix parvinotata =

Scientific classification
- Kingdom: Animalia
- Phylum: Arthropoda
- Clade: Pancrustacea
- Class: Insecta
- Order: Lepidoptera
- Family: Bucculatricidae
- Genus: Bucculatrix
- Species: B. parvinotata

Binomial name
- Bucculatrix parvinotata Braun, 1963

Species of moth

Bucculatrix parvinotata is a moth in the family Bucculatricidae. It is found in North America, where it has been recorded from Arizona and New Mexico. It was described by Annette Frances Braun in 1963.

The wingspan is 11 mm. The forewings are white with black scales. The hindwings are ocherous tinged. Adults have been recorded on wing in July.
