= Bucculatrix pyrivorella =

Scientific classification
- Kingdom: Animalia
- Phylum: Arthropoda
- Clade: Pancrustacea
- Class: Insecta
- Order: Lepidoptera
- Family: Bucculatricidae
- Genus: Bucculatrix
- Species: B. pyrivorella

Binomial name
- Bucculatrix pyrivorella Kuroko, 1964

Species of moth

Bucculatrix pyrivorella (pear leaf miner) is a moth of the family Bucculatricidae. It is found in Japan (on the islands of Hokkaido, Honshu, Shikoku and Kyushu), the Korean Peninsula and the Russian Far East. It was described in 1964 by Hiroshi Kuroko.

The wingspan is 7–7.5 mm. There are four generations per year.

The larvae feed on Pyrus pyrifolia and Malus species. They mine the leaves of their host plant. It is considered a pest on pear trees.
