= Bucculatrix regaella =

Scientific classification
- Kingdom: Animalia
- Phylum: Arthropoda
- Clade: Pancrustacea
- Class: Insecta
- Order: Lepidoptera
- Family: Bucculatricidae
- Genus: Bucculatrix
- Species: B. regaella

Binomial name
- Bucculatrix regaella Chrétien, 1907

Species of moth

Bucculatrix regaella is a moth in the family Bucculatricidae. It is found in Algeria. The species was described in 1907 by Pierre Chrétien.

The larvae feed on Helianthemum sessiliflorum.
