= Bucculatrix edocta =

Scientific classification
- Kingdom: Animalia
- Phylum: Arthropoda
- Clade: Pancrustacea
- Class: Insecta
- Order: Lepidoptera
- Family: Bucculatricidae
- Genus: Bucculatrix
- Species: B. edocta

Binomial name
- Bucculatrix edocta Meyrick, 1921

Species of moth

Bucculatrix edocta is a moth in the family Bucculatricidae. It was described by Edward Meyrick in 1921. It is found in Namibia and South Africa.
