= Bucculatrix divisa =

Scientific classification
- Kingdom: Animalia
- Phylum: Arthropoda
- Clade: Pancrustacea
- Class: Insecta
- Order: Lepidoptera
- Family: Bucculatricidae
- Genus: Bucculatrix
- Species: B. divisa

Binomial name
- Bucculatrix divisa Braun, 1925

Species of moth

Bucculatrix divisa is a moth in the family Bucculatricidae. It is found in North America, where it has been recorded from Utah and Washington. It was first described in 1925 by Annette Frances Braun.
