= Bucculatrix ptochastis =

Scientific classification
- Kingdom: Animalia
- Phylum: Arthropoda
- Clade: Pancrustacea
- Class: Insecta
- Order: Lepidoptera
- Family: Bucculatricidae
- Genus: Bucculatrix
- Species: B. ptochastis

Binomial name
- Bucculatrix ptochastis Meyrick, 1893

Species of moth

Bucculatrix ptochastis is a moth of the family Bucculatricidae. It is found in Australia. It was first described by Edward Meyrick in 1893.
