= Bucculatrix flexuosa =

Scientific classification
- Kingdom: Animalia
- Phylum: Arthropoda
- Clade: Pancrustacea
- Class: Insecta
- Order: Lepidoptera
- Family: Bucculatricidae
- Genus: Bucculatrix
- Species: B. flexuosa

Binomial name
- Bucculatrix flexuosa Walsingham, 1897

Species of moth

Bucculatrix flexuosa is a moth in the family Bucculatricidae. The species was described in 1897 by Thomas de Grey, 6th Baron Walsingham. It is found in the West Indies.

The larvae feed on Acacia nilotica.
