= Bucculatrix loxoptila =

Scientific classification
- Kingdom: Animalia
- Phylum: Arthropoda
- Clade: Pancrustacea
- Class: Insecta
- Order: Lepidoptera
- Family: Bucculatricidae
- Genus: Bucculatrix
- Species: B. loxoptila

Binomial name
- Bucculatrix loxoptila Meyrick, 1914

Species of moth

Bucculatrix loxoptila is a moth in the family Bucculatricidae. It was described by Edward Meyrick in 1914. It is found in Tanzania.

The larvae feed on Gossypium species.
