= Bucculatrix frigida =

Scientific classification
- Kingdom: Animalia
- Phylum: Arthropoda
- Clade: Pancrustacea
- Class: Insecta
- Order: Lepidoptera
- Family: Bucculatricidae
- Genus: Bucculatrix
- Species: B. frigida

Binomial name
- Bucculatrix frigida Deschka, 1992

Species of moth

Bucculatrix frigida is a moth in the family Bucculatricidae. It is found in North America, where it has been recorded from the northern Rocky Mountains (Alberta) and central Alaska. It was described by G. Deschka in 1992.

The length of the forewings is about 3.2 mm. The forewings is light grey.

The larvae feed on Artemisia frigida. They mine the leaves of their host plant.
