= Bucculatrix sinevi =

Scientific classification
- Kingdom: Animalia
- Phylum: Arthropoda
- Clade: Pancrustacea
- Class: Insecta
- Order: Lepidoptera
- Family: Bucculatricidae
- Genus: Bucculatrix
- Species: B. sinevi

Binomial name
- Bucculatrix sinevi Seksjaeva, 1988

Species of moth

Bucculatrix sinevi is a moth in the family Bucculatricidae. It was described by Svetlana Seksjaeva in 1988. It is found in Japan (Hokkaido) and the Russian Far East.

The wingspan is 7–8 mm. The forewings are creamy white with some dark fuscous irrorations. The hindwings are grey.
