= Bucculatrix pectinifera =

Scientific classification
- Kingdom: Animalia
- Phylum: Arthropoda
- Clade: Pancrustacea
- Class: Insecta
- Order: Lepidoptera
- Family: Bucculatricidae
- Genus: Bucculatrix
- Species: B. pectinifera

Binomial name
- Bucculatrix pectinifera Baryshnikova, 2007

Species of moth

Bucculatrix pectinifera is a moth in the family Bucculatricidae. It is found in the Jewish Autonomous Oblast of Russia. The species was described in 2007 by Svetlana Vladimirovna Baryshnikova.
