= Bucculatrix jiblahensis =

Scientific classification
- Kingdom: Animalia
- Phylum: Arthropoda
- Clade: Pancrustacea
- Class: Insecta
- Order: Lepidoptera
- Family: Bucculatricidae
- Genus: Bucculatrix
- Species: B. jiblahensis

Binomial name
- Bucculatrix jiblahensis Mey, 1999

Species of moth

Bucculatrix jiblahensis is a moth in the family Bucculatricidae. It was described by Wolfram Mey in 1999. It is found in Yemen.
