= Bucculatrix kogii =

Scientific classification
- Kingdom: Animalia
- Phylum: Arthropoda
- Clade: Pancrustacea
- Class: Insecta
- Order: Lepidoptera
- Family: Bucculatricidae
- Genus: Bucculatrix
- Species: B. kogii

Binomial name
- Bucculatrix kogii Kobayashi, Hirowatari & Kuroko, 2010

Species of moth

Bucculatrix kogii is a moth in the family Bucculatricidae. It was described by Shigeki Kobayashi, Toshiya Hirowatari and Hiroshi Kuroko in 2010. It is found in Japan (Hokkaido).

The wingspan is 7–8 mm. The forewings are white with dark brown irrorations. The hindwings are grey.

== Etymology ==
The species is named for Mr. Kogi, who collected the holotype.
