= Bucculatrix sphaeralceae =

Scientific classification
- Kingdom: Animalia
- Phylum: Arthropoda
- Clade: Pancrustacea
- Class: Insecta
- Order: Lepidoptera
- Family: Bucculatricidae
- Genus: Bucculatrix
- Species: B. sphaeralceae

Binomial name
- Bucculatrix sphaeralceae Braun, 1963

Species of moth

Bucculatrix sphaeralceae is a moth in the family Bucculatricidae. It is found in North America, where it has been recorded from Texas and California. It was first described by Annette Frances Braun in 1963.

Adults have been recorded on wing in October.

The larvae feed on Malva species.
