= Bucculatrix mellita =

Scientific classification
- Kingdom: Animalia
- Phylum: Arthropoda
- Clade: Pancrustacea
- Class: Insecta
- Order: Lepidoptera
- Family: Bucculatricidae
- Genus: Bucculatrix
- Species: B. mellita

Binomial name
- Bucculatrix mellita Meyrick, 1915

Species of moth

Bucculatrix mellita is a moth in the family Bucculatricidae. It was described by Edward Meyrick in 1915. It is found in Peru.
