= Bucculatrix sexnotata =

Scientific classification
- Kingdom: Animalia
- Phylum: Arthropoda
- Clade: Pancrustacea
- Class: Insecta
- Order: Lepidoptera
- Family: Bucculatricidae
- Genus: Bucculatrix
- Species: B. sexnotata

Binomial name
- Bucculatrix sexnotata Braun, 1927

Species of moth

Bucculatrix sexnotata is a moth in the family Bucculatricidae. It is found in North America, where it has been recorded from California, Kentucky, Maine, New Brunswick, North Carolina, Nova Scotia, Ohio, Ontario, Pennsylvania and Quebec. It was described in 1927 by Annette Frances Braun.
