= Bucculatrix xanthophylla =

Scientific classification
- Kingdom: Animalia
- Phylum: Arthropoda
- Clade: Pancrustacea
- Class: Insecta
- Order: Lepidoptera
- Family: Bucculatricidae
- Genus: Bucculatrix
- Species: B. xanthophylla

Binomial name
- Bucculatrix xanthophylla Meyrick, 1931

Species of moth

Bucculatrix xanthophylla is a moth in the family Bucculatricidae. It is found in Sierra Leone. It was described in 1931 by Edward Meyrick.
