= Bucculatrix subnitens =

Scientific classification
- Kingdom: Animalia
- Phylum: Arthropoda
- Clade: Pancrustacea
- Class: Insecta
- Order: Lepidoptera
- Family: Bucculatricidae
- Genus: Bucculatrix
- Species: B. subnitens

Binomial name
- Bucculatrix subnitens Walsingham, 1914

Species of moth

Bucculatrix subnitens is a moth in the family Bucculatricidae. It is found in North America, where it has been recorded from Arizona. The species was described by Thomas de Grey, 6th Baron Walsingham in 1914.
