= Bucculatrix recognita =

Scientific classification
- Kingdom: Animalia
- Phylum: Arthropoda
- Clade: Pancrustacea
- Class: Insecta
- Order: Lepidoptera
- Family: Bucculatricidae
- Genus: Bucculatrix
- Species: B. recognita

Binomial name
- Bucculatrix recognita Braun, 1963

Species of moth

Bucculatrix recognita is a species of moth in the family Bucculatricidae. It was described by Annette Frances Braun in 1963 and is found in North America, where it has been recorded from Ontario, Maine, New Hampshire, Massachusetts, Missouri, New Jersey, Washington, D.C., North Carolina and South Carolina.

The wingspan is 6–7.5 mm. Adults have been recorded on wing from August to October.

The larvae feed on Quercus macrocarpa. They mine the leaves of their host plant.
