= Bucculatrix ruficoma =

Scientific classification
- Kingdom: Animalia
- Phylum: Arthropoda
- Clade: Pancrustacea
- Class: Insecta
- Order: Lepidoptera
- Family: Bucculatricidae
- Genus: Bucculatrix
- Species: B. ruficoma

Binomial name
- Bucculatrix ruficoma Meyrick, 1931

Species of moth

Bucculatrix ruficoma is a moth in the family Bucculatricidae. It is found in Uganda. It was described in 1931 by Edward Meyrick.

The larvae feed on Ipomoea batatas.
