= Bucculatrix muraseae =

Scientific classification
- Kingdom: Animalia
- Phylum: Arthropoda
- Clade: Pancrustacea
- Class: Insecta
- Order: Lepidoptera
- Family: Bucculatricidae
- Genus: Bucculatrix
- Species: B. muraseae

Binomial name
- Bucculatrix muraseae Kobayashi, Hirowatari & Kuroko, 2010

Species of moth

Bucculatrix muraseae is a moth in the family Bucculatricidae. It was described by Shigeki Kobayashi, Toshiya Hirowatari and Hiroshi Kuroko in 2010. It is found in Japan (Hokkaido, Honshu).

The wingspan is 6–8 mm.

== Etymology ==
The species is named for Mr. Murase, who collected specimens of this species.
