= Bucculatrix fugitans =

Scientific classification
- Kingdom: Animalia
- Phylum: Arthropoda
- Clade: Pancrustacea
- Class: Insecta
- Order: Lepidoptera
- Family: Bucculatricidae
- Genus: Bucculatrix
- Species: B. fugitans

Binomial name
- Bucculatrix fugitans Braun, 1930

Species of moth

Bucculatrix fugitans is a moth in the family Bucculatricidae. It is found in North America, where it has been recorded from Ohio, Massachusetts and Maine. It was described in 1930 by Annette Frances Braun.

Adults have been recorded on wing from June to July.

The larvae feed on Corylus americana and possibly Corylus cornuta. They mine the leaves of their host plant.
