= Bucculatrix firmianella =

Scientific classification
- Kingdom: Animalia
- Phylum: Arthropoda
- Clade: Pancrustacea
- Class: Insecta
- Order: Lepidoptera
- Family: Bucculatricidae
- Genus: Bucculatrix
- Species: B. firmianella

Binomial name
- Bucculatrix firmianella Kuroko, 1982

Species of moth

Bucculatrix firmianella is a moth in the family Bucculatricidae. It was described by Hiroshi Kuroko in 1982. It is found in Japan (Honshu, Shikoku, Kyushu).
