= Bucculatrix cirrhographa =

Scientific classification
- Kingdom: Animalia
- Phylum: Arthropoda
- Clade: Pancrustacea
- Class: Insecta
- Order: Lepidoptera
- Family: Bucculatricidae
- Genus: Bucculatrix
- Species: B. cirrhographa

Binomial name
- Bucculatrix cirrhographa Meyrick, 1915

Species of moth

Bucculatrix cirrhographa is a moth in the family Bucculatricidae. It is found in Ecuador. It was first described in 1915 by Edward Meyrick.
