= Bucculatrix sanaaensis =

Scientific classification
- Kingdom: Animalia
- Phylum: Arthropoda
- Clade: Pancrustacea
- Class: Insecta
- Order: Lepidoptera
- Family: Bucculatricidae
- Genus: Bucculatrix
- Species: B. sanaaensis

Binomial name
- Bucculatrix sanaaensis Mey, 1999

Species of moth

Bucculatrix sanaaensis is a moth in the family Bucculatricidae. It was described in 1999 by Wolfram Mey and is found in Yemen.
