= Bucculatrix speciosa =

Scientific classification
- Kingdom: Animalia
- Phylum: Arthropoda
- Clade: Pancrustacea
- Class: Insecta
- Order: Lepidoptera
- Family: Bucculatricidae
- Genus: Bucculatrix
- Species: B. speciosa

Binomial name
- Bucculatrix speciosa Braun, 1963

Species of moth

Bucculatrix speciosa is a moth in the family Bucculatricidae. It is found in North America, where it has been recorded from Indiana and West Virginia. It was first described in 1963 by Annette Frances Braun.
