= Bucculatrix saccharata =

Scientific classification
- Kingdom: Animalia
- Phylum: Arthropoda
- Clade: Pancrustacea
- Class: Insecta
- Order: Lepidoptera
- Family: Bucculatricidae
- Genus: Bucculatrix
- Species: B. saccharata

Binomial name
- Bucculatrix saccharata Meyrick, 1915

Species of moth

Bucculatrix saccharata is a moth in the family Bucculatricidae. It is found in Colombia. It was first described by Edward Meyrick in 1915.
