= Bucculatrix gossypina =

Scientific classification
- Kingdom: Animalia
- Phylum: Arthropoda
- Clade: Pancrustacea
- Class: Insecta
- Order: Lepidoptera
- Family: Bucculatricidae
- Genus: Bucculatrix
- Species: B. gossypina

Binomial name
- Bucculatrix gossypina Ghesquière, 1940

Species of moth

Bucculatrix gossypina is a moth in the family Bucculatricidae. It was described by Jean Ghesquière in 1940. It is found in the Democratic Republic of the Congo.

Bucculatrix gossypina larvae feed on Gossypium species.
