= Bucculatrix yemenitica =

Scientific classification
- Kingdom: Animalia
- Phylum: Arthropoda
- Clade: Pancrustacea
- Class: Insecta
- Order: Lepidoptera
- Family: Bucculatricidae
- Genus: Bucculatrix
- Species: B. yemenitica

Binomial name
- Bucculatrix yemenitica Mey, 1999

Species of moth

Bucculatrix yemenitica is a moth in the family Bucculatricidae. It is found in Yemen. It was described in 1999 by Wolfram Mey.
