= Bucculatrix monelpis =

Scientific classification
- Kingdom: Animalia
- Phylum: Arthropoda
- Clade: Pancrustacea
- Class: Insecta
- Order: Lepidoptera
- Family: Bucculatricidae
- Genus: Bucculatrix
- Species: B. monelpis

Binomial name
- Bucculatrix monelpis Meyrick, 1928

Species of moth

Bucculatrix monelpis is a moth in the family Bucculatricidae. It was described by Edward Meyrick in 1928. It is found in Zimbabwe.
