= Bucculatrix andalusica =

Scientific classification
- Kingdom: Animalia
- Phylum: Arthropoda
- Clade: Pancrustacea
- Class: Insecta
- Order: Lepidoptera
- Family: Bucculatricidae
- Genus: Bucculatrix
- Species: B. andalusica

Binomial name
- Bucculatrix andalusica Deschka, 1980

Species of moth

Bucculatrix andalusica is a moth species in the family Bucculatricidae. It is found in southern Spain. It was first described by G. Deschka in 1980.

The larvae feed on Artemisia vulgaris. They mine the leaves of their host plant. Possibly creating a blotch mine.
