= Bucculatrix citima =

Scientific classification
- Kingdom: Animalia
- Phylum: Arthropoda
- Clade: Pancrustacea
- Class: Insecta
- Order: Lepidoptera
- Family: Bucculatricidae
- Genus: Bucculatrix
- Species: B. citima

Binomial name
- Bucculatrix citima Seksjaeva, 1989

Species of moth

Bucculatrix citima is a moth in the family Bucculatricidae. It was described by Svetlana Seksjaeva in 1989. It is found in the Russian Far East (Primorsky Krai) and Japan (Hokkaido, Honshu).

The wingspan is 6–7 mm.
