= Bucculatrix needhami =

Scientific classification
- Kingdom: Animalia
- Phylum: Arthropoda
- Clade: Pancrustacea
- Class: Insecta
- Order: Lepidoptera
- Family: Bucculatricidae
- Genus: Bucculatrix
- Species: B. needhami

Binomial name
- Bucculatrix needhami Braun, 1956

Species of moth

Bucculatrix needhami is a moth in the family Bucculatricidae. It was first described in 1956 by Annette Frances Braun. It is found in North America, where it has been recorded from Florida, Kentucky, Illinois, Maine, New York, Ohio, South Carolina and Texas.

The wingspan is 13–15 mm.

The larvae feed on Helianthus species. They create a gall, which has the form of thickening the walls of the stem.
