= Bucculatrix atrosignata =

Scientific classification
- Kingdom: Animalia
- Phylum: Arthropoda
- Clade: Pancrustacea
- Class: Insecta
- Order: Lepidoptera
- Family: Bucculatricidae
- Genus: Bucculatrix
- Species: B. atrosignata

Binomial name
- Bucculatrix atrosignata Braun, 1963

Species of moth

Bucculatrix atrosignata is a moth in the family Bucculatricidae. It was described by Annette Frances Braun in 1963. It is found in North America, where it has been recorded from Utah.

The wingspan is 6.5–7 mm. The forewings are white. The markings are formed by groups of broadly black-tipped scales and a few greyish scales along the basal third of the costa. The hindwings are white.
