= Bucculatrix statica =

Scientific classification
- Kingdom: Animalia
- Phylum: Arthropoda
- Clade: Pancrustacea
- Class: Insecta
- Order: Lepidoptera
- Family: Bucculatricidae
- Genus: Bucculatrix
- Species: B. statica

Binomial name
- Bucculatrix statica Meyrick, 1921

Species of moth

Bucculatrix statica is a moth in the family Bucculatricidae. It is found on Java. It was first described by Edward Meyrick in 1921.
