= Bucculatrix columbiana =

Scientific classification
- Kingdom: Animalia
- Phylum: Arthropoda
- Clade: Pancrustacea
- Class: Insecta
- Order: Lepidoptera
- Family: Bucculatricidae
- Genus: Bucculatrix
- Species: B. columbiana

Binomial name
- Bucculatrix columbiana Braun, 1963

Species of moth

Bucculatrix columbiana is a moth in the family Bucculatricidae. It is found in North America, where it has been recorded from British Columbia and California. It was first described in 1963 by Annette Frances Braun.

Adults have been recorded on wing in June and November.

The larvae feed on Iva axillaris. Pupation takes place in a white cocoon, spun on the underside of the leaves.
