= Bucculatrix xenaula =

Scientific classification
- Kingdom: Animalia
- Phylum: Arthropoda
- Clade: Pancrustacea
- Class: Insecta
- Order: Lepidoptera
- Family: Bucculatricidae
- Genus: Bucculatrix
- Species: B. xenaula

Binomial name
- Bucculatrix xenaula Meyrick, 1893

Species of moth

Bucculatrix xenaula is a moth of the family Bucculatricidae. It is found in South Australia. It was described in 1893 by Edward Meyrick.

Its larvae have been found feeding on the leaves Sterculia and Brachychiton species.
