= Bucculatrix lassella =

Scientific classification
- Kingdom: Animalia
- Phylum: Arthropoda
- Clade: Pancrustacea
- Class: Insecta
- Order: Lepidoptera
- Family: Bucculatricidae
- Genus: Bucculatrix
- Species: B. lassella

Binomial name
- Bucculatrix lassella Meyrick, 1880

Species of moth

Bucculatrix lassella is a moth of the family Bucculatricidae. It is found in Australia. It was first described in 1880 by Edward Meyrick.
