= Bucculatrix ulocarena =

Scientific classification
- Kingdom: Animalia
- Phylum: Arthropoda
- Clade: Pancrustacea
- Class: Insecta
- Order: Lepidoptera
- Family: Bucculatricidae
- Genus: Bucculatrix
- Species: B. ulocarena

Binomial name
- Bucculatrix ulocarena Turner, 1923

Species of moth

Bucculatrix ulocarena is a moth of the family Bucculatricidae. It is found in Australia. It was described in 1923 by Alfred Jefferis Turner.
