= Bucculatrix packardella =

Scientific classification
- Kingdom: Animalia
- Phylum: Arthropoda
- Clade: Pancrustacea
- Class: Insecta
- Order: Lepidoptera
- Family: Bucculatricidae
- Genus: Bucculatrix
- Species: B. packardella

Binomial name
- Bucculatrix packardella Chambers, 1873

Species of moth

Bucculatrix packardella is a moth in the family Bucculatricidae. It was described by Vactor Tousey Chambers in 1873. It is found in North America, where it has been recorded from Ohio, Maine, Michigan, Ontario, Pennsylvania, Washington, D.C., Delaware, New Jersey, New York and Rhode Island.

The wingspan is 6–6.5 mm.
