= Bucculatrix polytita =

Scientific classification
- Kingdom: Animalia
- Phylum: Arthropoda
- Clade: Pancrustacea
- Class: Insecta
- Order: Lepidoptera
- Family: Bucculatricidae
- Genus: Bucculatrix
- Species: B. polytita

Binomial name
- Bucculatrix polytita Braun, 1963

Species of moth

Bucculatrix polytita is a moth in the family Bucculatricidae. It is found in North America, where it has been recorded from Ontario and Quebec. It was described by Annette Frances Braun in 1963.

Adults have been recorded on wing in July.
