= Bucculatrix caspica =

Scientific classification
- Kingdom: Animalia
- Phylum: Arthropoda
- Clade: Pancrustacea
- Class: Insecta
- Order: Lepidoptera
- Family: Bucculatricidae
- Genus: Bucculatrix
- Species: B. caspica

Binomial name
- Bucculatrix caspica Puplesis & Sruoga, 1991

Species of moth

Bucculatrix caspica is a moth in the family Bucculatricidae. It was described by R. Puplesis and V. Sruoga in 1991. It is found in Kazakhstan, Uzbekistan, Tajikistan and the southern part of European Russia. It is most likely a synonym of Bucculatrix ulmifoliae.

The length of the forewings is 2.9–3.1 mm for males and 3.3 mm for females.

The larvae feed on Ulmus species. They mine the leaves of their host plant.
