= Bucculatrix flourensiae =

Scientific classification
- Kingdom: Animalia
- Phylum: Arthropoda
- Clade: Pancrustacea
- Class: Insecta
- Order: Lepidoptera
- Family: Bucculatricidae
- Genus: Bucculatrix
- Species: B. flourensiae

Binomial name
- Bucculatrix flourensiae Braun, 1963

Species of moth

Bucculatrix flourensiae is a species of moth in the family Bucculatricidae. It is found in North America, where it has been recorded from Arizona. It was described by Annette Frances Braun in 1963.

The wingspan is 6.5–7 mm. It feeds primarily on Flourensia cernua.
