= Bucculatrix tridenticola =

Scientific classification
- Kingdom: Animalia
- Phylum: Arthropoda
- Clade: Pancrustacea
- Class: Insecta
- Order: Lepidoptera
- Family: Bucculatricidae
- Genus: Bucculatrix
- Species: B. tridenticola

Binomial name
- Bucculatrix tridenticola Braun, 1963

Species of moth

Bucculatrix tridenticola is a species of moth in the family Bucculatricidae. It is found in North America, where it has been recorded from Manitoba, Colorado, Oregon, Washington, Utah, California and Nevada. The species was first described in 1963 by Annette Frances Braun.

Adults have been recorded on wing from July to August.

The larvae feed on Artemisia tridentata.
