= Bucculatrix pectinella =

Scientific classification
- Kingdom: Animalia
- Phylum: Arthropoda
- Clade: Pancrustacea
- Class: Insecta
- Order: Lepidoptera
- Family: Bucculatricidae
- Genus: Bucculatrix
- Species: B. pectinella

Binomial name
- Bucculatrix pectinella Deschka, 1981

Species of moth

Bucculatrix pectinella is a moth of the family Bucculatricidae. It is found in Iran and Turkmenistan. It was first described in 1981 by G. Descka.

The length of the forewings is about 3.5 mm.
