= Bucculatrix notella =

Scientific classification
- Kingdom: Animalia
- Phylum: Arthropoda
- Clade: Pancrustacea
- Class: Insecta
- Order: Lepidoptera
- Family: Bucculatricidae
- Genus: Bucculatrix
- Species: B. notella

Binomial name
- Bucculatrix notella Seksjaeva, 1996

Species of moth

Bucculatrix notella is a moth in the family Bucculatricidae. It was described by Svetlana Seksjaeva in 1996. It is found in Japan (Hokkaido, Honshu, Kyushu) and the Russian Far East.

The wingspan is 6–7 mm.

The larvae feed on Artemisia princeps. They mine the leaves of their host plant.
