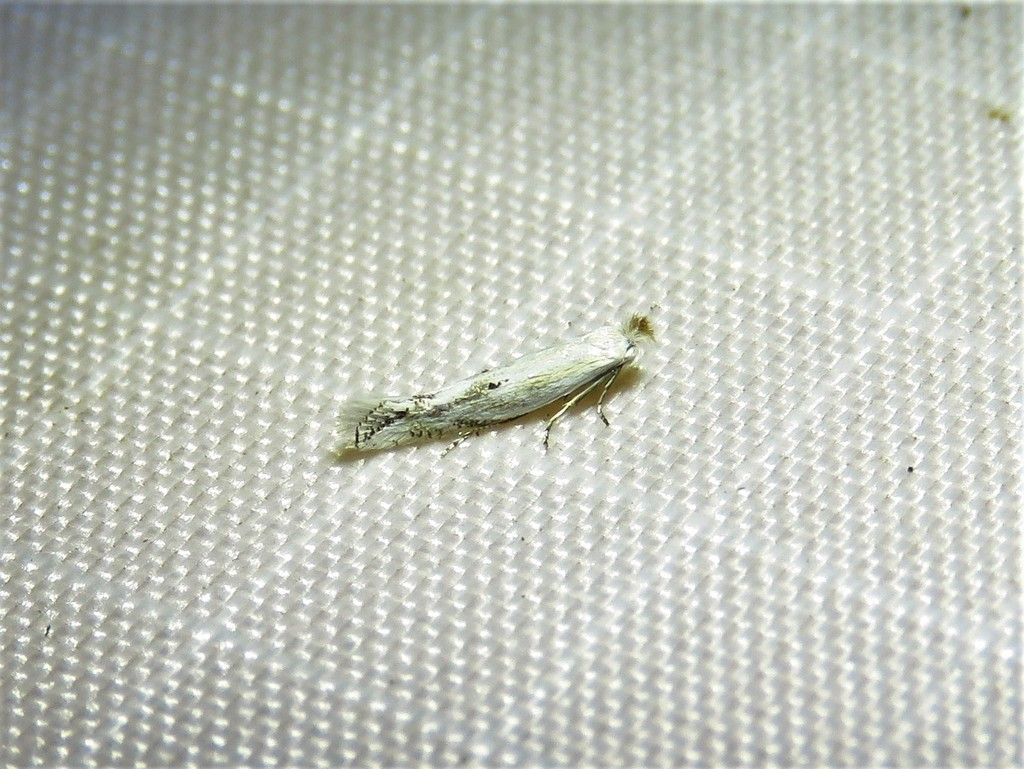

Scientific classification
- Kingdom: Animalia
- Phylum: Arthropoda
- Clade: Pancrustacea
- Class: Insecta
- Order: Lepidoptera
- Family: Bucculatricidae
- Genus: Bucculatrix
- Species: B. longula

Binomial name
- Bucculatrix longula Braun, 1963

= Bucculatrix longula =

Species of moth

Bucculatrix longula is a moth in the family Bucculatricidae. It was described by Annette Frances Braun in 1963. It is found in North America, where it has been recorded from California, Texas, Washington and Utah.

The larvae feed on Helianthus annuus. They create a stem gall.
