= Bucculatrix asphyctella =

Scientific classification
- Kingdom: Animalia
- Phylum: Arthropoda
- Clade: Pancrustacea
- Class: Insecta
- Order: Lepidoptera
- Family: Bucculatricidae
- Genus: Bucculatrix
- Species: B. asphyctella

Binomial name
- Bucculatrix asphyctella Meyrick, 1880

Species of moth

Bucculatrix asphyctella is a moth species of the family Bucculatricidae. It was first described by Edward Meyrick in 1880. It is found in Australia.
