= Bucculatrix exedra =

Scientific classification
- Kingdom: Animalia
- Phylum: Arthropoda
- Clade: Pancrustacea
- Class: Insecta
- Order: Lepidoptera
- Family: Bucculatricidae
- Genus: Bucculatrix
- Species: B. exedra

Binomial name
- Bucculatrix exedra Meyrick, 1915

Species of moth

Bucculatrix exedra is a species of moth of the family Bucculatricidae. It is found in Japan (Honshu, Shikoku, Kyushu) and India. It was first described in 1915 by Edward Meyrick.

The wingspan is about 8 mm.

The larvae feed on Firmiana platanifolia. They mine the leaves of their host plant.
