= Bucculatrix callistricha =

Scientific classification
- Kingdom: Animalia
- Phylum: Arthropoda
- Clade: Pancrustacea
- Class: Insecta
- Order: Lepidoptera
- Family: Bucculatricidae
- Genus: Bucculatrix
- Species: B. callistricha

Binomial name
- Bucculatrix callistricha Braun, 1963

Species of moth

Bucculatrix callistricha is a moth in the family Bucculatricidae. It is found in North America, where it has been recorded from Ohio, Kentucky, Maine, Wisconsin and Quebec. It was first described by Annette Frances Braun in 1963.
