= Bucculatrix ceibae =

Scientific classification
- Kingdom: Animalia
- Phylum: Arthropoda
- Clade: Pancrustacea
- Class: Insecta
- Order: Lepidoptera
- Family: Bucculatricidae
- Genus: Bucculatrix
- Species: B. ceibae

Binomial name
- Bucculatrix ceibae Zeller, 1871

Species of moth

Bucculatrix ceibae is a moth in the family Bucculatricidae. It is found in Bolivia. It was first described by Philipp Christoph Zeller in 1871.

The larvae feed on Ceiba species.
