= Bucculatrix crateracma =

Scientific classification
- Kingdom: Animalia
- Phylum: Arthropoda
- Clade: Pancrustacea
- Class: Insecta
- Order: Lepidoptera
- Family: Bucculatricidae
- Genus: Bucculatrix
- Species: B. crateracma

Binomial name
- Bucculatrix crateracma Meyrick, 1918

Species of moth

Bucculatrix crateracma is a moth in the family Bucculatricidae. It was described by Edward Meyrick in 1918 and is found in India.

The larvae feed on Bombax ceiba.
