= Bucculatrix criticopa =

Scientific classification
- Kingdom: Animalia
- Phylum: Arthropoda
- Clade: Pancrustacea
- Class: Insecta
- Order: Lepidoptera
- Family: Bucculatricidae
- Genus: Bucculatrix
- Species: B. criticopa

Binomial name
- Bucculatrix criticopa Meyrick, 1915

Species of moth

Bucculatrix criticopa is a moth in the family Bucculatricidae. It was described by Edward Meyrick in 1915 and is found in Guyana.
