= Bucculatrix tsurubamella =

Scientific classification
- Kingdom: Animalia
- Phylum: Arthropoda
- Clade: Pancrustacea
- Class: Insecta
- Order: Lepidoptera
- Family: Bucculatricidae
- Genus: Bucculatrix
- Species: B. tsurubamella

Binomial name
- Bucculatrix tsurubamella Kobayashi, Hirowatari & Kuroko, 2010

Species of moth

Bucculatrix tsurubamella is a moth in the family Bucculatricidae. It was described by Shigeki Kobayashi, Toshiya Hirowatari and Hiroshi Kuroko in 2010. It is found on Honshu, the main island of Japan.

The wingspan is 6–7 mm.
