= Bucculatrix verax =

Scientific classification
- Kingdom: Animalia
- Phylum: Arthropoda
- Clade: Pancrustacea
- Class: Insecta
- Order: Lepidoptera
- Family: Bucculatricidae
- Genus: Bucculatrix
- Species: B. verax

Binomial name
- Bucculatrix verax Meyrick, 1918

Species of moth

Bucculatrix verax is a moth in the family Bucculatricidae. It is found in India. The species was described in 1918 by Edward Meyrick.

The larvae feed on Trewia nudiflora.
