= Bucculatrix plucheae =

Scientific classification
- Kingdom: Animalia
- Phylum: Arthropoda
- Clade: Pancrustacea
- Class: Insecta
- Order: Lepidoptera
- Family: Bucculatricidae
- Genus: Bucculatrix
- Species: B. plucheae

Binomial name
- Bucculatrix plucheae Braun, 1963

Species of moth

Bucculatrix plucheae is a moth in the family Bucculatricidae. It is found in North America, where it has been recorded from Florida. It was first described in 1963 by Annette Frances Braun.

Adults have been recorded on wing from April to May and in November.

The larvae feed on Pluchea odorata.
