= Bucculatrix copeuta =

Scientific classification
- Kingdom: Animalia
- Phylum: Arthropoda
- Clade: Pancrustacea
- Class: Insecta
- Order: Lepidoptera
- Family: Bucculatricidae
- Genus: Bucculatrix
- Species: B. copeuta

Binomial name
- Bucculatrix copeuta Meyrick, 1919

Species of moth

Bucculatrix copeuta is a moth in the family Bucculatricidae. It is found in North America, where it has been recorded from Ontario and Maine. The species was first described in 1919 by Edward Meyrick.

The larvae possibly feed on Prunus pensylvanica.
