= Bucculatrix kendalli =

Scientific classification
- Kingdom: Animalia
- Phylum: Arthropoda
- Clade: Pancrustacea
- Class: Insecta
- Order: Lepidoptera
- Family: Bucculatricidae
- Genus: Bucculatrix
- Species: B. kendalli

Binomial name
- Bucculatrix kendalli Blanchard & Knudson, 1985

Species of moth

Bucculatrix kendalli is a moth in the family Bucculatricidae. It is found in North America, where it has been recorded from Texas. It was described by André Blanchard and Edward C. Knudson in 1985.

The larvae feed on Colubrina texensis. They mine the leaves of their host plant. Older larvae feed freely on the leaf.
