= Bucculatrix eschatias =

Scientific classification
- Kingdom: Animalia
- Phylum: Arthropoda
- Clade: Pancrustacea
- Class: Insecta
- Order: Lepidoptera
- Family: Bucculatricidae
- Genus: Bucculatrix
- Species: B. eschatias

Binomial name
- Bucculatrix eschatias Meyrick, 1916

Species of moth

Bucculatrix eschatias is a moth in the family Bucculatricidae. It is found in India. It was described in 1916 by Edward Meyrick.
