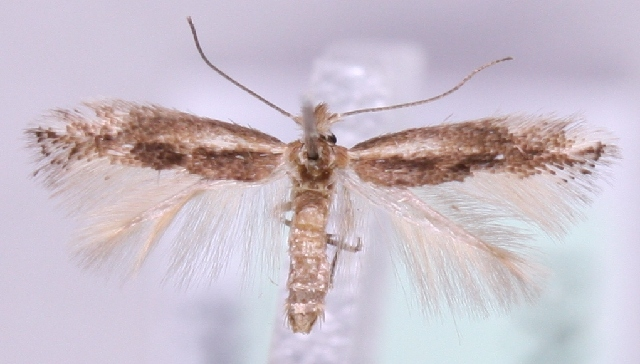

Scientific classification
- Kingdom: Animalia
- Phylum: Arthropoda
- Clade: Pancrustacea
- Class: Insecta
- Order: Lepidoptera
- Family: Bucculatricidae
- Genus: Bucculatrix
- Species: B. chrysanthemella

Binomial name
- Bucculatrix chrysanthemella Rebel, 1896

= Bucculatrix chrysanthemella =

Species of moth

Bucculatrix chrysanthemella is a moth in the family Bucculatricidae. It was described by Hans Rebel in 1896. It is found on the Canary Islands. The species has been introduced in France, Italy, Great Britain and Finland.

The wingspan is 6.5–7.5 mm.

The larvae feed on Argyranthemum frutescens, Argyranthemum teneriffae and Gonospermum fruticosum. They mine the leaves of their host plant. Larvae can be found from January to March.
