= Bucculatrix mirnae =

Scientific classification
- Kingdom: Animalia
- Phylum: Arthropoda
- Clade: Pancrustacea
- Class: Insecta
- Order: Lepidoptera
- Family: Bucculatricidae
- Genus: Bucculatrix
- Species: B. mirnae

Binomial name
- Bucculatrix mirnae H.A. Vargas & G.R.P. Moreira, 2012

Species of moth

Bucculatrix mirnae is a moth in the family Bucculatricidae. It is found in the Azapa Valley in northern Chile. The species was first described in 2012 by Héctor Vargas and Gilson R.P. Moreira.

The length of the forewings is 2.78–3.33 millimetres (0.109–0.131 in).
