= Bucculatrix ochritincta =

Scientific classification
- Kingdom: Animalia
- Phylum: Arthropoda
- Clade: Pancrustacea
- Class: Insecta
- Order: Lepidoptera
- Family: Bucculatricidae
- Genus: Bucculatrix
- Species: B. ochritincta

Binomial name
- Bucculatrix ochritincta Braun, 1963

Species of moth

Bucculatrix ochritincta is a species of moth in the family Bucculatricidae. It is found in North America, where it has been recorded from Maine and Tennessee. It was described by Annette Frances Braun in 1963.
