= Bucculatrix oncota =

Scientific classification
- Kingdom: Animalia
- Phylum: Arthropoda
- Clade: Pancrustacea
- Class: Insecta
- Order: Lepidoptera
- Family: Bucculatricidae
- Genus: Bucculatrix
- Species: B. oncota

Binomial name
- Bucculatrix oncota Meyrick, 1919

Species of moth

Bucculatrix oncota is a moth in the family Bucculatricidae. It was described by Edward Meyrick in 1919. It is found in India.
