= Bucculatrix franseriae =

Scientific classification
- Kingdom: Animalia
- Phylum: Arthropoda
- Clade: Pancrustacea
- Class: Insecta
- Order: Lepidoptera
- Family: Bucculatricidae
- Genus: Bucculatrix
- Species: B. franseriae

Binomial name
- Bucculatrix franseriae Braun, 1963

Species of moth

Bucculatrix franseriae is a moth in the family Bucculatricidae. It is found in North America, where it has been recorded from Arizona and California. It was described in 1963 by Annette Frances Braun.

The larvae feed on Ambrosia deltoidea.
