= Bucculatrix ochrisuffusa =

Scientific classification
- Kingdom: Animalia
- Phylum: Arthropoda
- Clade: Pancrustacea
- Class: Insecta
- Order: Lepidoptera
- Family: Bucculatricidae
- Genus: Bucculatrix
- Species: B. ochrisuffusa

Binomial name
- Bucculatrix ochrisuffusa Braun, 1963

Species of moth

Bucculatrix ochrisuffusa is a moth in the family Bucculatricidae. It is found in North America, where it has been recorded from Ohio. It was described in 1963 by Annette Frances Braun.

The larvae probably feed on Quercus alba.
