= Bucculatrix khomasi =

Scientific classification
- Kingdom: Animalia
- Phylum: Arthropoda
- Clade: Pancrustacea
- Class: Insecta
- Order: Lepidoptera
- Family: Bucculatricidae
- Genus: Bucculatrix
- Species: B. khomasi

Binomial name
- Bucculatrix khomasi Mey, 2011

Species of moth

Bucculatrix khomasi is a moth in the family Bucculatricidae. It was described by Wolfram Mey in 2011. It is found in Namibia.
