= Bucculatrix tanymorpha =

Scientific classification
- Kingdom: Animalia
- Phylum: Arthropoda
- Clade: Pancrustacea
- Class: Insecta
- Order: Lepidoptera
- Family: Bucculatricidae
- Genus: Bucculatrix
- Species: B. tanymorpha

Binomial name
- Bucculatrix tanymorpha Meyrick, 1915

Species of moth

Bucculatrix tanymorpha is a moth in the family Bucculatricidae. It is found in Peru. The species was described by Edward Meyrick in 1915.
