= Bucculatrix diffusella =

Scientific classification
- Kingdom: Animalia
- Phylum: Arthropoda
- Clade: Pancrustacea
- Class: Insecta
- Order: Lepidoptera
- Family: Bucculatricidae
- Genus: Bucculatrix
- Species: B. diffusella

Binomial name
- Bucculatrix diffusella Menhofer, 1943

Species of moth

Bucculatrix diffusella is a moth in the family Bucculatricidae. It was described by Herbert Menhofer in 1943. It is found in south-western France.

The larvae feed on Artemisia maritima. They mine the leaves of their host plant. Young larvae are honey yellow with a brown head. The older larvae are yellowish olive green with a brown head.
