= Bucculatrix hamaboella =

Scientific classification
- Kingdom: Animalia
- Phylum: Arthropoda
- Clade: Pancrustacea
- Class: Insecta
- Order: Lepidoptera
- Family: Bucculatricidae
- Genus: Bucculatrix
- Species: B. hamaboella

Binomial name
- Bucculatrix hamaboella Kobayashi, Hirowatari & Kuroko, 2009

Species of moth

Bucculatrix hamaboella is a moth in the family Bucculatricidae. It was described by Shigeki Kobayashi, Toshiya Hirowatari and Hiroshi Kuroko in 2009. It is found in Japan (Honshu).
