= Bucculatrix similis =

Scientific classification
- Kingdom: Animalia
- Phylum: Arthropoda
- Clade: Pancrustacea
- Class: Insecta
- Order: Lepidoptera
- Family: Bucculatricidae
- Genus: Bucculatrix
- Species: B. similis

Binomial name
- Bucculatrix similis Baryshnikova, 2005

Species of moth

Bucculatrix similis is a moth in the family Bucculatricidae. It was described by Svetlana Vladimirovna Baryshnikova in 2005. It is found in Russia.
