= Bucculatrix koebelella =

Scientific classification
- Kingdom: Animalia
- Phylum: Arthropoda
- Clade: Pancrustacea
- Class: Insecta
- Order: Lepidoptera
- Family: Bucculatricidae
- Genus: Bucculatrix
- Species: B. koebelella

Binomial name
- Bucculatrix koebelella Busck, 1910

Species of moth

Bucculatrix koebelella is a species of moth in the family Bucculatricidae. It is found in North America, where it has been recorded from California. It was described in 1910 by August Busck.

Adults have been recorded on wing from February to April, in June and in September, probably in two generations per year.
