= Bucculatrix lovtsovae =

Scientific classification
- Kingdom: Animalia
- Phylum: Arthropoda
- Clade: Pancrustacea
- Class: Insecta
- Order: Lepidoptera
- Family: Bucculatricidae
- Genus: Bucculatrix
- Species: B. lovtsovae

Binomial name
- Bucculatrix lovtsovae Baryshnikova, 2013

Species of moth

Bucculatrix lovtsovae is a moth in the family Bucculatricidae. It was described by Svetlana Vladimirovna Baryshnikova in 2013. It is found in the Russian Far East (Primorsky).

The wingspan is about 12 mm.
