= Bucculatrix acrogramma =

Scientific classification
- Kingdom: Animalia
- Phylum: Arthropoda
- Clade: Pancrustacea
- Class: Insecta
- Order: Lepidoptera
- Family: Bucculatricidae
- Genus: Bucculatrix
- Species: B. acrogramma

Binomial name
- Bucculatrix acrogramma Meyrick, 1919

Species of moth

Bucculatrix acrogramma is a moth of the family Bucculatricidae that was first described by Edward Meyrick in 1919. It is found in Australia.
