= Bucculatrix parasimilis =

Scientific classification
- Kingdom: Animalia
- Phylum: Arthropoda
- Clade: Pancrustacea
- Class: Insecta
- Order: Lepidoptera
- Family: Bucculatricidae
- Genus: Bucculatrix
- Species: B. parasimilis

Binomial name
- Bucculatrix parasimilis Baryshnikova, 2005

Species of moth

Bucculatrix parasimilis is a moth in the family Bucculatricidae. It was described by Svetlana Vladimirovna Baryshnikova in 2005. It is found in Russia.
