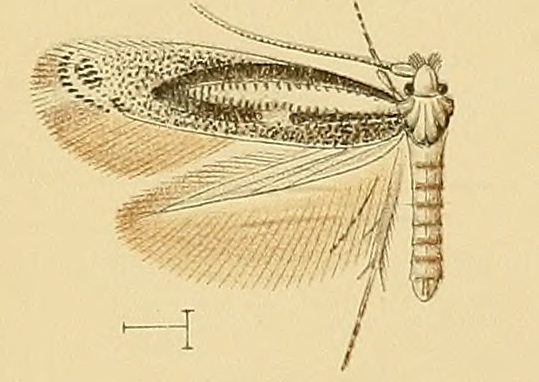

Scientific classification
- Kingdom: Animalia
- Phylum: Arthropoda
- Clade: Pancrustacea
- Class: Insecta
- Order: Lepidoptera
- Family: Bucculatricidae
- Genus: Bucculatrix
- Species: B. canariensis

Binomial name
- Bucculatrix canariensis Walsingham, 1908

= Bucculatrix canariensis =

Species of moth

Bucculatrix canariensis is a moth species of the family Bucculatricidae and was first described by Thomas de Grey, 6th Baron Walsingham in 1908. It is found on the Canary Islands.

The wingspan is 7–8 mm. The forewings are whitish, sprinkled with greyish fuscous and some blackish scaling. The hindwings are shining pale stone-grey.

The larvae feed on Artemisia thuscula. They mine the leaves of their host plant. The larvae can be found from March to April.
