= Bucculatrix niveella =

Scientific classification
- Kingdom: Animalia
- Phylum: Arthropoda
- Clade: Pancrustacea
- Class: Insecta
- Order: Lepidoptera
- Family: Bucculatricidae
- Genus: Bucculatrix
- Species: B. niveella

Binomial name
- Bucculatrix niveella Chambers, 1875

Species of moth

Bucculatrix niveella is a moth in the family Bucculatricidae. It is found in North America, where it has been recorded from Texas and Maine. It was described by Vactor Tousey Chambers in 1875. Adults have been recorded on wing from June to August.
