= Bucculatrix formosa =

Scientific classification
- Kingdom: Animalia
- Phylum: Arthropoda
- Clade: Pancrustacea
- Class: Insecta
- Order: Lepidoptera
- Family: Bucculatricidae
- Genus: Bucculatrix
- Species: B. formosa

Binomial name
- Bucculatrix formosa Puplesis & Seksjaeva, 1992

Species of moth

Bucculatrix formosa is a moth in the family Bucculatricidae. It is found in the Kugitangtau Mountains in Turkmenistan. It was described in 1992 by Rimantas Puplesis and Svetlana Seksjaeva.

The length of the forewings is 2.1–2.7 mm. The hindwings are creamish-white. Adults have been recorded on wing from August to September.
