= Bucculatrix ulmicola =

Scientific classification
- Kingdom: Animalia
- Phylum: Arthropoda
- Clade: Pancrustacea
- Class: Insecta
- Order: Lepidoptera
- Family: Bucculatricidae
- Genus: Bucculatrix
- Species: B. ulmicola

Binomial name
- Bucculatrix ulmicola Kuznetzov, 1962

Species of moth

Bucculatrix ulmicola is a moth in the family Bucculatricidae. It was described by Vladimir Ivanovitsch Kuznetzov in 1962. It is found in Armenia, Kazakhstan, Turkmenistan, Uzbekistan, Tajikistan, Ukraine and southern Russia.

The larvae feed on Ulmus species. They mine the leaves of their host plant.
