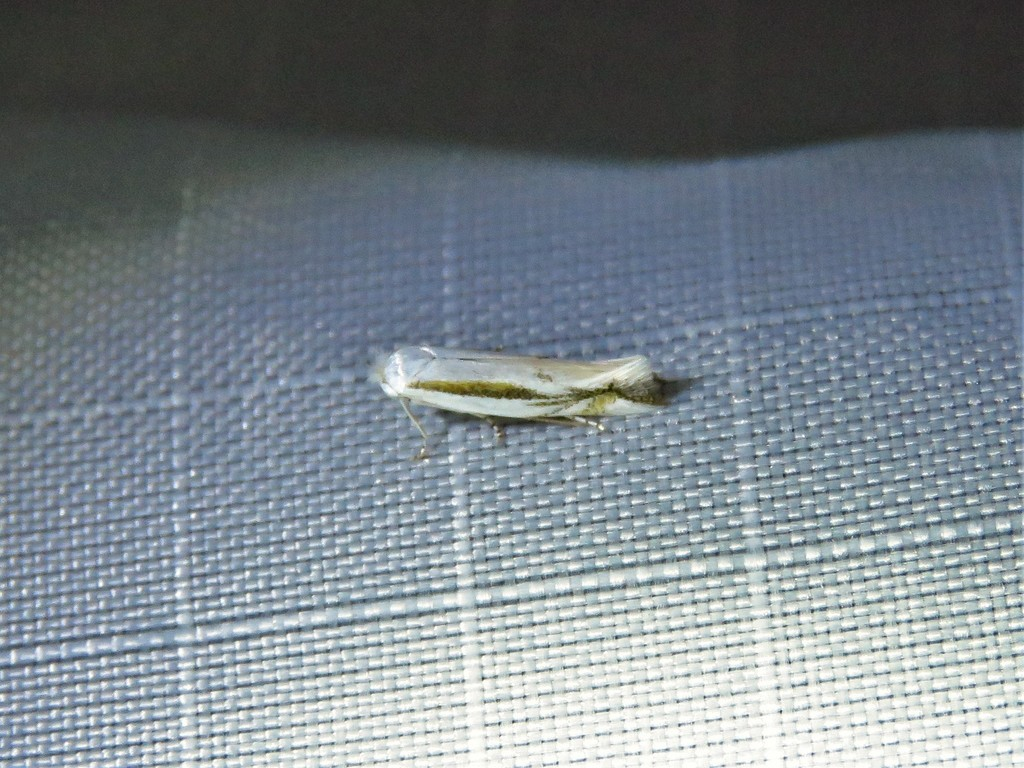

Scientific classification
- Kingdom: Animalia
- Phylum: Arthropoda
- Clade: Pancrustacea
- Class: Insecta
- Order: Lepidoptera
- Family: Bucculatricidae
- Genus: Bucculatrix
- Species: B. magnella

Binomial name
- Bucculatrix magnella Chambers, 1875

= Bucculatrix magnella =

Species of moth

Bucculatrix magnella is a moth in the family Bucculatricidae. It was described in 1875 by Vactor Tousey Chambers. It is found in North America, where it has been recorded from Alabama, Illinois, Florida, Louisiana, Maine, Mississippi, Missouri and Texas.
