= Bucculatrix clerotheta =

Scientific classification
- Kingdom: Animalia
- Phylum: Arthropoda
- Clade: Pancrustacea
- Class: Insecta
- Order: Lepidoptera
- Family: Bucculatricidae
- Genus: Bucculatrix
- Species: B. clerotheta

Binomial name
- Bucculatrix clerotheta Meyrick, 1915

Species of moth

Bucculatrix clerotheta is a moth in the family Bucculatricidae. It was described in 1915 by Edward Meyrick. It is found in India.
