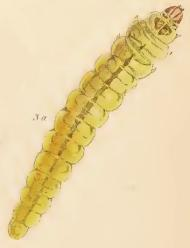
- Drawing of Bucculatrix quinquenotella larva

Scientific classification
- Kingdom: Animalia
- Phylum: Arthropoda
- Clade: Pancrustacea
- Class: Insecta
- Order: Lepidoptera
- Family: Bucculatricidae
- Genus: Bucculatrix
- Species: B. quinquenotella

Binomial name
- Bucculatrix quinquenotella Chambers, 1875

= Bucculatrix quinquenotella =

Species of moth

Bucculatrix quinquenotella is a species of moth of the family Bucculatricidae. It is found in North America, including Kentucky, Ohio, Michigan, Missouri, Iowa, Tennessee, Georgia, South Carolina, North Carolina, Washington, D.C., New Jersey, Massachusetts, New Hampshire, Ontario, Quebec and Nova Scotia. It was described in 1875 by Vactor Tousey Chambers.

The larvae feed on Ampelopsis species.
