= Bucculatrix sororcula =

Scientific classification
- Kingdom: Animalia
- Phylum: Arthropoda
- Clade: Pancrustacea
- Class: Insecta
- Order: Lepidoptera
- Family: Bucculatricidae
- Genus: Bucculatrix
- Species: B. sororcula

Binomial name
- Bucculatrix sororcula Braun, 1963

Species of moth

Bucculatrix sororcula is a moth in the family Bucculatricidae. It is found in North America, where it has been recorded from Arizona and California. It was first described by Annette Frances Braun in 1963.
