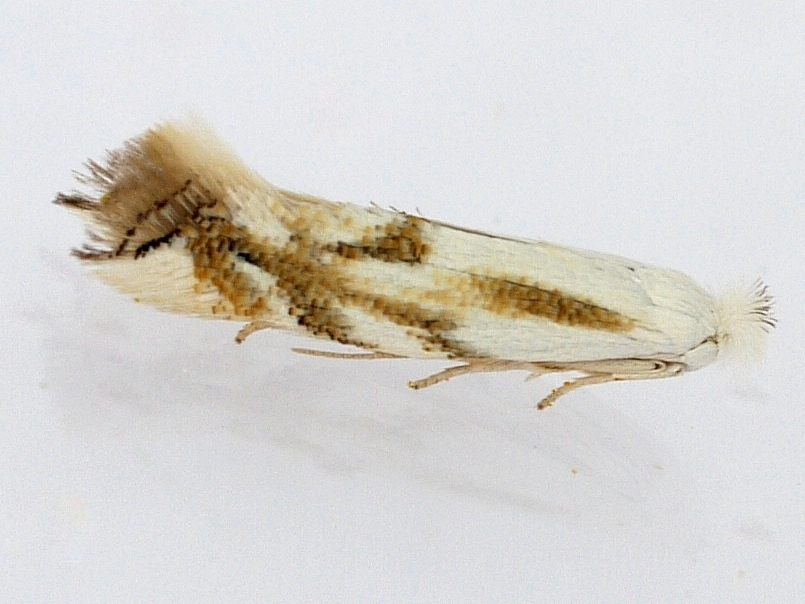

Scientific classification
- Kingdom: Animalia
- Phylum: Arthropoda
- Clade: Pancrustacea
- Class: Insecta
- Order: Lepidoptera
- Family: Bucculatricidae
- Genus: Bucculatrix
- Species: B. solidaginiella

Binomial name
- Bucculatrix solidaginiella Braun, 1963

= Bucculatrix solidaginiella =

Species of moth

Bucculatrix solidaginiella is a species of moth in the family Bucculatricidae. It is found in North America, where it has been recorded from Florida, Louisiana, Maine, Missouri, New Jersey, Mississippi and Ohio. It was described in 1963 by Annette Frances Braun.

The wingspan is 11–12.5 mm. Adults are on wing from April to August.

The larvae feed on Solidago species.
