= Bucculatrix endospiralis =

Scientific classification
- Kingdom: Animalia
- Phylum: Arthropoda
- Clade: Pancrustacea
- Class: Insecta
- Order: Lepidoptera
- Family: Bucculatricidae
- Genus: Bucculatrix
- Species: B. endospiralis

Binomial name
- Bucculatrix endospiralis Deschka, 1981

Species of moth

Bucculatrix endospiralis is a moth of the family Bucculatricidae. It was described by G. Deschka in 1981. It is found in Iran and Yemen.
