= Bucculatrix iranica =

Scientific classification
- Kingdom: Animalia
- Phylum: Arthropoda
- Clade: Pancrustacea
- Class: Insecta
- Order: Lepidoptera
- Family: Bucculatricidae
- Genus: Bucculatrix
- Species: B. iranica

Binomial name
- Bucculatrix iranica Deschka, 1981

Species of moth

Bucculatrix iranica is a moth of the family Bucculatricidae. It was described by G. Deschka in 1981 and is found in Iran.

The length of the forewings is about 4.8 mm.
