= Bucculatrix bicristata =

Scientific classification
- Kingdom: Animalia
- Phylum: Arthropoda
- Clade: Pancrustacea
- Class: Insecta
- Order: Lepidoptera
- Family: Bucculatricidae
- Genus: Bucculatrix
- Species: B. bicristata

Binomial name
- Bucculatrix bicristata Braun, 1963

Species of moth

Bucculatrix bicristata is a species of moth in the family Bucculatricidae. The species was first described in 1963 by Annette Frances Braun. It is found in North America, where it has been recorded from Florida.

The wingspan is 14 mm. Adults have been recorded on wing in May.
