= Bucculatrix quieta =

Scientific classification
- Kingdom: Animalia
- Phylum: Arthropoda
- Clade: Pancrustacea
- Class: Insecta
- Order: Lepidoptera
- Family: Bucculatricidae
- Genus: Bucculatrix
- Species: B. quieta

Binomial name
- Bucculatrix quieta Meyrick, 1913

Species of moth

Bucculatrix quieta is a moth in the family Bucculatricidae. It is found in South Africa. It was described in 1913 by Edward Meyrick.
