= Bucculatrix stictopus =

Scientific classification
- Kingdom: Animalia
- Phylum: Arthropoda
- Clade: Pancrustacea
- Class: Insecta
- Order: Lepidoptera
- Family: Bucculatricidae
- Genus: Bucculatrix
- Species: B. stictopus

Binomial name
- Bucculatrix stictopus Walsingham, 1914

Species of moth

Bucculatrix stictopus is a moth in the family Bucculatricidae. It is found in Mexico. The species was described by Thomas de Grey, 6th Baron Walsingham in 1914.
