= Bucculatrix pallidula =

Scientific classification
- Kingdom: Animalia
- Phylum: Arthropoda
- Clade: Pancrustacea
- Class: Insecta
- Order: Lepidoptera
- Family: Bucculatricidae
- Genus: Bucculatrix
- Species: B. pallidula

Binomial name
- Bucculatrix pallidula Braun, 1963

Species of moth

Bucculatrix pallidula is a species of moth in the family Bucculatricidae. It is found in North America, where it has been recorded from Maine and Utah. It was described in 1963 by Annette Frances Braun.

The wingspan is about 5.5 mm. Adults have been recorded on wing in from June to July.

The larvae feed on a labiate shrub. They mine the leaves of their host plant.
