= Bucculatrix lustrella =

Scientific classification
- Kingdom: Animalia
- Phylum: Arthropoda
- Clade: Pancrustacea
- Class: Insecta
- Order: Lepidoptera
- Family: Bucculatricidae
- Genus: Bucculatrix
- Species: B. lustrella

Binomial name
- Bucculatrix lustrella Snellen, 1884

Species of moth

Bucculatrix lustrella is a moth in the family Bucculatricidae. It was described by Pieter Cornelius Tobias Snellen in 1884. It is found in Russia.

The wingspan is about 8 mm.
