= Bucculatrix viguierae =

Scientific classification
- Kingdom: Animalia
- Phylum: Arthropoda
- Clade: Pancrustacea
- Class: Insecta
- Order: Lepidoptera
- Family: Bucculatricidae
- Genus: Bucculatrix
- Species: B. viguierae

Binomial name
- Bucculatrix viguierae Braun, 1962

Species of moth

Bucculatrix viguierae is a moth in the family Bucculatricidae. It is found in North America, where it has been recorded from New Mexico, Arizona and California. It was first described by Annette Frances Braun in 1962.

Adults have been recorded on wing in April, September and November.
