= Bucculatrix mendax =

Scientific classification
- Kingdom: Animalia
- Phylum: Arthropoda
- Clade: Pancrustacea
- Class: Insecta
- Order: Lepidoptera
- Family: Bucculatricidae
- Genus: Bucculatrix
- Species: B. mendax

Binomial name
- Bucculatrix mendax Meyrick, 1918

Species of moth

Bucculatrix mendax is a moth in the family Bucculatricidae. It was described in 1918 by Edward Meyrick. It is found in India.

The larvae feed on Dalbergia sissoo.
