= Bucculatrix eucalypti =

Scientific classification
- Kingdom: Animalia
- Phylum: Arthropoda
- Clade: Pancrustacea
- Class: Insecta
- Order: Lepidoptera
- Family: Bucculatricidae
- Genus: Bucculatrix
- Species: B. eucalypti

Binomial name
- Bucculatrix eucalypti Meyrick, 1880

Species of moth

Bucculatrix eucalypti is a moth of the family Bucculatricidae. It was described in 1880 by Edward Meyrick and is found in Australia.

The larvae feed on Eucalyptus species. They feed on the underside of the leaves, eroding the surface of the leaf. They pupate in a longitudinally ribbed cocoon.
