= Bucculatrix gossypiella =

Scientific classification
- Kingdom: Animalia
- Phylum: Arthropoda
- Clade: Pancrustacea
- Class: Insecta
- Order: Lepidoptera
- Family: Bucculatricidae
- Genus: Bucculatrix
- Species: B. gossypiella

Binomial name
- Bucculatrix gossypiella Morrill, 1927

Species of moth

Bucculatrix gossypiella is a moth in the family Bucculatricidae. It is found in North America, where it has been recorded from Mexico. The species was described in 1927 by A. W. Morrill.
