= Bucculatrix cretica =

Scientific classification
- Kingdom: Animalia
- Phylum: Arthropoda
- Clade: Pancrustacea
- Class: Insecta
- Order: Lepidoptera
- Family: Bucculatricidae
- Genus: Bucculatrix
- Species: B. cretica

Binomial name
- Bucculatrix cretica Deschka, 1991

Species of moth

Bucculatrix cretica is a moth in the family Bucculatricidae. It was described by G. Deschka in 1991. It is found on Crete.

The length of the forewings is about 3.5 mm.
