= Bucculatrix mesoporphyra =

Scientific classification
- Kingdom: Animalia
- Phylum: Arthropoda
- Clade: Pancrustacea
- Class: Insecta
- Order: Lepidoptera
- Family: Bucculatricidae
- Genus: Bucculatrix
- Species: B. mesoporphyra

Binomial name
- Bucculatrix mesoporphyra (Turner, 1933)

Synonyms
- Tinea mesoporphyra Turner, 1933

Species of moth

Bucculatrix mesoporphyra is a moth of the family Bucculatricidae. It is found in Australia. It was first described in 1933 by Alfred Jefferis Turner.
