= Bucculatrix centroptila =

Scientific classification
- Kingdom: Animalia
- Phylum: Arthropoda
- Clade: Pancrustacea
- Class: Insecta
- Order: Lepidoptera
- Family: Bucculatricidae
- Genus: Bucculatrix
- Species: B. centroptila

Binomial name
- Bucculatrix centroptila Meyrick, 1934

Species of moth

Bucculatrix centroptila is a moth in the family Bucculatricidae that was first described in 1934 by Edward Meyrick. It is found in India.

The larvae feed on Firmiana colorata.
