= Bucculatrix eremospora =

Scientific classification
- Kingdom: Animalia
- Phylum: Arthropoda
- Clade: Pancrustacea
- Class: Insecta
- Order: Lepidoptera
- Family: Bucculatricidae
- Genus: Bucculatrix
- Species: B. eremospora

Binomial name
- Bucculatrix eremospora Meyrick, 1936

Species of moth

Bucculatrix eremospora is a moth in the family Bucculatricidae. The species was first described by Edward Meyrick in 1936. It is found in Taiwan.
