= Bucculatrix cerina =

Scientific classification
- Kingdom: Animalia
- Phylum: Arthropoda
- Clade: Pancrustacea
- Class: Insecta
- Order: Lepidoptera
- Family: Bucculatricidae
- Genus: Bucculatrix
- Species: B. cerina

Binomial name
- Bucculatrix cerina Braun, 1963

Species of moth

Bucculatrix cerina is a moth in the family Bucculatricidae. It is found in North America, where it has been recorded from Florida. It was first described in 1963 by Annette Frances Braun.

Adults have been recorded on wing in January and November.
