= Bucculatrix eupatoriella =

Scientific classification
- Kingdom: Animalia
- Phylum: Arthropoda
- Clade: Pancrustacea
- Class: Insecta
- Order: Lepidoptera
- Family: Bucculatricidae
- Genus: Bucculatrix
- Species: B. eupatoriella

Binomial name
- Bucculatrix eupatoriella Braun, 1918

Species of moth

Bucculatrix eupatoriella is a moth in the family Bucculatricidae. It is found in North America, where it has been recorded from Ohio and North Carolina. It was described in 1918 by Annette Frances Braun.

The larvae feed on Eupatorium perfoliatum. They mine the leaves of their host plant. Pupation takes place in a white cocoon.
