= Bucculatrix diacapna =

Scientific classification
- Kingdom: Animalia
- Phylum: Arthropoda
- Clade: Pancrustacea
- Class: Insecta
- Order: Lepidoptera
- Family: Bucculatricidae
- Genus: Bucculatrix
- Species: B. diacapna

Binomial name
- Bucculatrix diacapna Meyrick, 1920

Species of moth

Bucculatrix diacapna is a moth in the family Bucculatricidae. It was described by Edward Meyrick in 1920. It is found in north-western Persia.
