= Bucculatrix ussurica =

Scientific classification
- Kingdom: Animalia
- Phylum: Arthropoda
- Clade: Pancrustacea
- Class: Insecta
- Order: Lepidoptera
- Family: Bucculatricidae
- Genus: Bucculatrix
- Species: B. ussurica

Binomial name
- Bucculatrix ussurica Seksjaeva, 1996

Species of moth

Bucculatrix ussurica is a moth in the family Bucculatricidae. It was described by Svetlana Seksjaeva in 1996. It is found in Russia.
