= Bucculatrix salutatoria =

Scientific classification
- Kingdom: Animalia
- Phylum: Arthropoda
- Clade: Pancrustacea
- Class: Insecta
- Order: Lepidoptera
- Family: Bucculatricidae
- Genus: Bucculatrix
- Species: B. salutatoria

Binomial name
- Bucculatrix salutatoria Braun, 1925

Species of moth

Bucculatrix salutatoria is a species of moth in the family Bucculatricidae. It is found in North America, where it has been recorded from Utah, Colorado, Wyoming and British Columbia. The species was first described by Annette Frances Braun in 1925.

The wingspan is 8–9.5 mm.

The larvae feed on Artemisia tridentata. They mine the leaves of their host plant.
