= Bucculatrix paliuricola =

Scientific classification
- Kingdom: Animalia
- Phylum: Arthropoda
- Clade: Pancrustacea
- Class: Insecta
- Order: Lepidoptera
- Family: Bucculatricidae
- Genus: Bucculatrix
- Species: B. paliuricola

Binomial name
- Bucculatrix paliuricola Kuznetzov, 1960

Species of moth

Bucculatrix paliuricola is a moth in the family Bucculatricidae. It was described by Vladimir Ivanovitsch Kuznetzov in 1960 (sources differ: The Global Lepidoptera Names Index and Lepidoptera and Some Other Life Forms give 1956). It is found in Turkmenistan and Ukraine.
