= Bucculatrix abdita =

Scientific classification
- Kingdom: Animalia
- Phylum: Arthropoda
- Clade: Pancrustacea
- Class: Insecta
- Order: Lepidoptera
- Family: Bucculatricidae
- Genus: Bucculatrix
- Species: B. abdita

Binomial name
- Bucculatrix abdita Seksjaeva, 1989

Species of moth

Bucculatrix abdita is a moth in the family Bucculatricidae. It was described by Svetlana Seksjaeva in 1989. It is found in the Russian Far East (Primorsky Krai).
