= Bucculatrix spectabilis =

Scientific classification
- Kingdom: Animalia
- Phylum: Arthropoda
- Clade: Pancrustacea
- Class: Insecta
- Order: Lepidoptera
- Family: Bucculatricidae
- Genus: Bucculatrix
- Species: B. spectabilis

Binomial name
- Bucculatrix spectabilis Braun, 1963

Species of moth

Bucculatrix spectabilis is a moth in the family Bucculatricidae first described by Annette Frances Braun in 1963. It is found in North America, where it has been recorded from Arizona.

The wingspan is about 7.5 mm.
