= Bucculatrix hobohmi =

Scientific classification
- Kingdom: Animalia
- Phylum: Arthropoda
- Clade: Pancrustacea
- Class: Insecta
- Order: Lepidoptera
- Family: Bucculatricidae
- Genus: Bucculatrix
- Species: B. hobohmi

Binomial name
- Bucculatrix hobohmi Mey, 2004

Species of moth

Bucculatrix hobohmi is a moth in the family Bucculatricidae. It was described by Wolfram Mey in 2004. It is found in Namibia.
