= Bucculatrix agilis =

Scientific classification
- Kingdom: Animalia
- Phylum: Arthropoda
- Clade: Pancrustacea
- Class: Insecta
- Order: Lepidoptera
- Family: Bucculatricidae
- Genus: Bucculatrix
- Species: B. agilis

Binomial name
- Bucculatrix agilis Meyrick, 1920

Species of moth

Bucculatrix agilis is a moth species in the family Bucculatricidae. It was first described by Edward Meyrick in 1920 and is found in South Africa.

It has been recorded feeding on Acacia horrida.
