= Bucculatrix nota =

Scientific classification
- Kingdom: Animalia
- Phylum: Arthropoda
- Clade: Pancrustacea
- Class: Insecta
- Order: Lepidoptera
- Family: Bucculatricidae
- Genus: Bucculatrix
- Species: B. nota

Binomial name
- Bucculatrix nota Seksjaeva, 1989

Species of moth

Bucculatrix nota is a moth in the family Bucculatricidae. It was described by Svetlana Seksjaeva in 1989. It is found in the Russian Far East (Primorsky Krai) and Japan (Honshu).

The larvae feed on Artemisia princeps. They mine the leaves of their host plant.
