= Bucculatrix taeniola =

Scientific classification
- Kingdom: Animalia
- Phylum: Arthropoda
- Clade: Pancrustacea
- Class: Insecta
- Order: Lepidoptera
- Family: Bucculatricidae
- Genus: Bucculatrix
- Species: B. taeniola

Binomial name
- Bucculatrix taeniola Braun, 1963

Species of moth

Bucculatrix taeniola is a moth in the family Bucculatricidae. It is found in North America, where it has been recorded from California. The species was described by Annette Frances Braun in 1963.

The larvae feed on white sage, which could refer to Salvia apiana or Eurotia lanata.
