= Bucculatrix unipuncta =

Scientific classification
- Kingdom: Animalia
- Phylum: Arthropoda
- Clade: Pancrustacea
- Class: Insecta
- Order: Lepidoptera
- Family: Bucculatricidae
- Genus: Bucculatrix
- Species: B. unipuncta

Binomial name
- Bucculatrix unipuncta Walsingham, 1897

Species of moth

Bucculatrix unipuncta is a moth in the family Bucculatricidae. It is found in the West Indies. The species was described by Thomas de Grey, 6th Baron Walsingham in 1897.
