= Bucculatrix tenebricosa =

Scientific classification
- Kingdom: Animalia
- Phylum: Arthropoda
- Clade: Pancrustacea
- Class: Insecta
- Order: Lepidoptera
- Family: Bucculatricidae
- Genus: Bucculatrix
- Species: B. tenebricosa

Binomial name
- Bucculatrix tenebricosa Braun, 1925

Species of moth

Bucculatrix tenebricosa is a moth in the family Bucculatricidae. It is found in North America, where it has been recorded from Utah. The species was described by Annette Frances Braun in 1925.
