= Bucculatrix altera =

Scientific classification
- Kingdom: Animalia
- Phylum: Arthropoda
- Clade: Pancrustacea
- Class: Insecta
- Order: Lepidoptera
- Family: Bucculatricidae
- Genus: Bucculatrix
- Species: B. altera

Binomial name
- Bucculatrix altera Seksjaeva, 1989

Species of moth

Bucculatrix altera is a moth in the family Bucculatricidae. It was described by Svetlana Seksjaeva in 1989. It is found in the Russian Far East (Primorsky Krai) and Japan (Hokkaido).

The wingspan is 7–8.2 mm.
