= Bucculatrix immaculatella =

Scientific classification
- Kingdom: Animalia
- Phylum: Arthropoda
- Clade: Pancrustacea
- Class: Insecta
- Order: Lepidoptera
- Family: Bucculatricidae
- Genus: Bucculatrix
- Species: B. immaculatella

Binomial name
- Bucculatrix immaculatella Chambers, 1875

Species of moth

Bucculatrix immaculatella is a moth in the family Bucculatricidae. It is found in North America, where it has been recorded from Maine and New Hampshire. It was described in 1875 by Vactor Tousey Chambers.

Adults have been recorded on wing in from June to July.
