= Bucculatrix gossypii =

Scientific classification
- Kingdom: Animalia
- Phylum: Arthropoda
- Clade: Pancrustacea
- Class: Insecta
- Order: Lepidoptera
- Family: Bucculatricidae
- Genus: Bucculatrix
- Species: B. gossypii

Binomial name
- Bucculatrix gossypii Turner, 1926

Species of moth

Bucculatrix gossypii is a moth of the family Bucculatricidae. It is found in Queensland, Australia. The species was described in 1926 by Alfred Jefferis Turner.

The larvae are considered a minor pest, since they feed on the foliage of Gossypium hirsutum. They initially mine the leaves of their host plant. Later, they eat holes in the leaves.
