= Bucculatrix hagnopis =

Scientific classification
- Kingdom: Animalia
- Phylum: Arthropoda
- Clade: Pancrustacea
- Class: Insecta
- Order: Lepidoptera
- Family: Bucculatricidae
- Genus: Bucculatrix
- Species: B. hagnopis

Binomial name
- Bucculatrix hagnopis Meyrick, 1930

Species of moth

Bucculatrix hagnopis is a moth in the family Bucculatricidae. It is found in India. The species was first described in 1930 by Edward Meyrick.
