= Bucculatrix armeniaca =

Scientific classification
- Kingdom: Animalia
- Phylum: Arthropoda
- Clade: Pancrustacea
- Class: Insecta
- Order: Lepidoptera
- Family: Bucculatricidae
- Genus: Bucculatrix
- Species: B. armeniaca

Binomial name
- Bucculatrix armeniaca Deschka, 1992

Species of moth

Bucculatrix armeniaca is a moth in the family Bucculatricidae. It is found in Armenia and the southern part of European Russia. The species was first described by G. Deschka in 1992.

The wingspan is 7.6–7.8 mm.
