= Bucculatrix benenotata =

Scientific classification
- Kingdom: Animalia
- Phylum: Arthropoda
- Clade: Pancrustacea
- Class: Insecta
- Order: Lepidoptera
- Family: Bucculatricidae
- Genus: Bucculatrix
- Species: B. benenotata

Binomial name
- Bucculatrix benenotata Braun, 1963

Species of moth

Bucculatrix benenotata is a moth in the family Bucculatricidae. It was described by Annette Frances Braun in 1963. It is found in North America, where it has been recorded from Arizona.

The wingspan is about 8 mm.
