= Bucculatrix praecipua =

Scientific classification
- Kingdom: Animalia
- Phylum: Arthropoda
- Clade: Pancrustacea
- Class: Insecta
- Order: Lepidoptera
- Family: Bucculatricidae
- Genus: Bucculatrix
- Species: B. praecipua

Binomial name
- Bucculatrix praecipua Meyrick, 1918

Species of moth

Bucculatrix praecipua is a moth in the family Bucculatricidae. It is found in South Africa. It was described by Edward Meyrick in 1918.
