= Bucculatrix leptalea =

Scientific classification
- Kingdom: Animalia
- Phylum: Arthropoda
- Clade: Pancrustacea
- Class: Insecta
- Order: Lepidoptera
- Family: Bucculatricidae
- Genus: Bucculatrix
- Species: B. leptalea

Binomial name
- Bucculatrix leptalea Braun, 1963

Species of moth

Bucculatrix leptalea is a moth in the family Bucculatricidae. It was described by Annette Frances Braun in 1953. It is found in North America, where it has been recorded from Michigan, Manitoba, Washington and California.

The larvae feed on Artemisia dracunculus.
