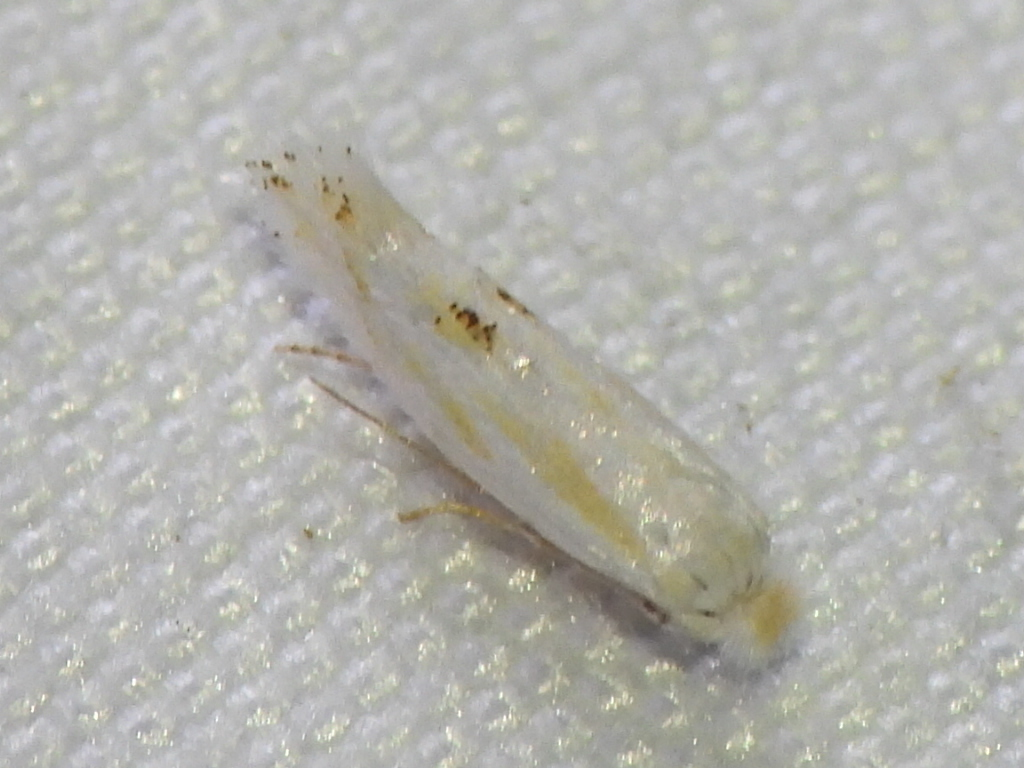

Scientific classification
- Kingdom: Animalia
- Phylum: Arthropoda
- Clade: Pancrustacea
- Class: Insecta
- Order: Lepidoptera
- Family: Bucculatricidae
- Genus: Bucculatrix
- Species: B. simulans

Binomial name
- Bucculatrix simulans Braun, 1963

Synonyms
- Bucculatrix fusicola Breyland & Schmidt, 1948 (nec. Braun, 1920)

= Bucculatrix simulans =

Species of moth

Bucculatrix simulans is a moth in the family Bucculatricidae. It is found in North America, where it has been recorded from Texas to Iowa and Ohio. It was described in 1963 by Annette Frances Braun.

The wingspan is 9.5–10 mm. Adults have been recorded on wing from January to July.

The larvae feed on Helianthus species. They create a stem gall. Pupation takes place in a white to light grey cocoon.
