= Bucculatrix amiculella =

Scientific classification
- Kingdom: Animalia
- Phylum: Arthropoda
- Clade: Pancrustacea
- Class: Insecta
- Order: Lepidoptera
- Family: Bucculatricidae
- Genus: Bucculatrix
- Species: B. amiculella

Binomial name
- Bucculatrix amiculella Zeller, 1897

Species of moth

Bucculatrix amiculella is a moth in the family Bucculatricidae and is known to be found in Colombia. It was first described by Philipp Christoph Zeller in 1897.

The larvae have been recorded feeding on Quercus species.
