= Bucculatrix ramallahensis =

Scientific classification
- Kingdom: Animalia
- Phylum: Arthropoda
- Clade: Pancrustacea
- Class: Insecta
- Order: Lepidoptera
- Family: Bucculatricidae
- Genus: Bucculatrix
- Species: B. ramallahensis

Binomial name
- Bucculatrix ramallahensis Amsel, 1935

Species of moth

Bucculatrix ramallahensis is a moth in the family Bucculatricidae. It is found in Palestine. It was described in 1935 by Hans Georg Amsel.
