= Bucculatrix acuta =

Scientific classification
- Kingdom: Animalia
- Phylum: Arthropoda
- Clade: Pancrustacea
- Class: Insecta
- Order: Lepidoptera
- Family: Bucculatricidae
- Genus: Bucculatrix
- Species: B. acuta

Binomial name
- Bucculatrix acuta Baryshnikova, 2001

Species of moth

Bucculatrix acuta is a moth in the family Bucculatricidae. It was first described by Svetlana Vladimirovna Baryshnikova in 2001, and is found in Nepal.
