= Bucculatrix univoca =

Scientific classification
- Kingdom: Animalia
- Phylum: Arthropoda
- Clade: Pancrustacea
- Class: Insecta
- Order: Lepidoptera
- Family: Bucculatricidae
- Genus: Bucculatrix
- Species: B. univoca

Binomial name
- Bucculatrix univoca Meyrick, 1918

Species of moth

Bucculatrix univoca is a moth in the family Bucculatricidae. It was described by Edward Meyrick in 1918. It is found in Japan (Kyushu, Ryukyu), Taiwan and India.

The wingspan is 5–6.5 mm.

The larvae feed on Ipomoea aquatica (syn. I. reptans); Ipomoea indica (syn. I. congesta); and Ipomoea batatas. They mine the leaves of their host plant.
