= Bucculatrix agnella =

Scientific classification
- Kingdom: Animalia
- Phylum: Arthropoda
- Clade: Pancrustacea
- Class: Insecta
- Order: Lepidoptera
- Family: Bucculatricidae
- Genus: Bucculatrix
- Species: B. agnella

Binomial name
- Bucculatrix agnella Clemens, 1860

Synonyms
- Bucculatrix capitealbella Chambers, 1873; Bucculatrix albicapitella Chambers, 1875

Species of moth

Bucculatrix agnella is a species of moth in the family Bucculatricidae. The species was first described by James Brackenridge Clemens in 1860. It is found in North America, where it has been recorded in Pennsylvania, New Jersey, New York, Washington, D.C., Massachusetts, Indiana, Tennessee, Kentucky, Michigan, Missouri, South Dakota, Maine, Ohio and Texas.

The wingspan is about 7 mm.
