= Bucculatrix tetanota =

Scientific classification
- Kingdom: Animalia
- Phylum: Arthropoda
- Clade: Pancrustacea
- Class: Insecta
- Order: Lepidoptera
- Family: Bucculatricidae
- Genus: Bucculatrix
- Species: B. tetanota

Binomial name
- Bucculatrix tetanota Meyrick, 1918

Species of moth

Bucculatrix tetanota is a moth in the family Bucculatricidae. The species was described by Edward Meyrick in 1918. It is found in India.
