= Bucculatrix trifasciella =

Scientific classification
- Kingdom: Animalia
- Phylum: Arthropoda
- Clade: Pancrustacea
- Class: Insecta
- Order: Lepidoptera
- Family: Bucculatricidae
- Genus: Bucculatrix
- Species: B. trifasciella

Binomial name
- Bucculatrix trifasciella Clemens, 1866

Synonyms
- Bucculatrix obscurofasciella Chambers, 1873

Species of moth

Bucculatrix trifasciella is a moth in the family Bucculatricidae. It was first described by James Brackenridge Clemens in 1866 and is found in North America, where it has been recorded from Maine, New Hampshire, Pennsylvania, New Jersey, Kentucky, Ohio and Ontario.

The larvae feed on Quercus species. They mine the leaves of their host plant.
