= Bucculatrix porthmis =

Scientific classification
- Kingdom: Animalia
- Phylum: Arthropoda
- Clade: Pancrustacea
- Class: Insecta
- Order: Lepidoptera
- Family: Bucculatricidae
- Genus: Bucculatrix
- Species: B. porthmis

Binomial name
- Bucculatrix porthmis Meyrick, 1908

Species of moth

Bucculatrix porthmis is a moth in the family Bucculatricidae. It was described by Edward Meyrick in 1908. It is found in South Africa.
