= Bucculatrix fusicola =

Scientific classification
- Kingdom: Animalia
- Phylum: Arthropoda
- Clade: Pancrustacea
- Class: Insecta
- Order: Lepidoptera
- Family: Bucculatricidae
- Genus: Bucculatrix
- Species: B. fusicola

Binomial name
- Bucculatrix fusicola Braun, 1920

Species of moth

Bucculatrix fusicola is a moth in the family Bucculatricidae. It is found in North America, where it has been recorded from Florida, Maine and Ohio. The species was described in 1920 by Annette Frances Braun.
