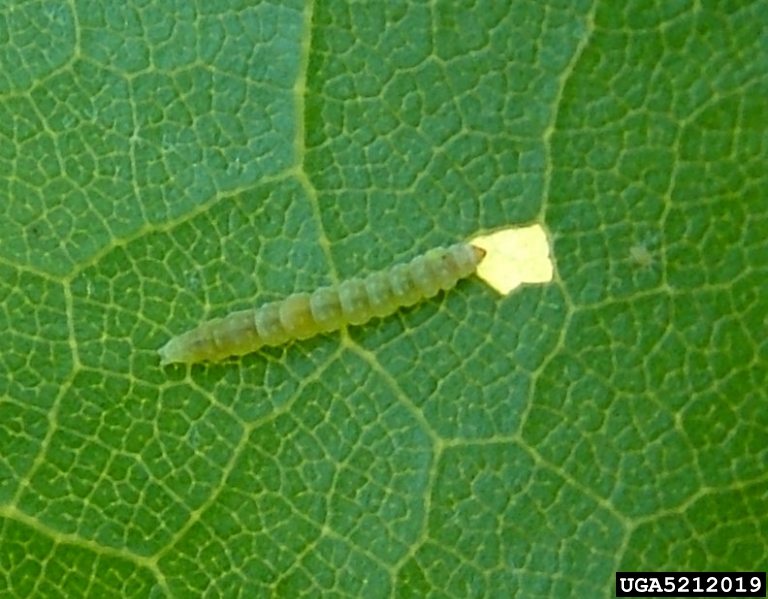
- Larval stage

Scientific classification
- Kingdom: Animalia
- Phylum: Arthropoda
- Clade: Pancrustacea
- Class: Insecta
- Order: Lepidoptera
- Family: Bucculatricidae
- Genus: Bucculatrix
- Species: B. albertiella

Binomial name
- Bucculatrix albertiella Busck, 1910

Synonyms
- Bucculatrix tetrella Braun, 1910

= Bucculatrix albertiella =

Species of moth

The oak-ribbed skeletonizer (Bucculatrix albertiella) is a moth species of the family Bucculatricidae. It was first described by August Busck in 1910. It is found in Alameda County, California. Its wingspan is 8 mm. and the larvae feed on Quercus species.
