= Bucculatrix pannonica =

Scientific classification
- Kingdom: Animalia
- Phylum: Arthropoda
- Clade: Pancrustacea
- Class: Insecta
- Order: Lepidoptera
- Family: Bucculatricidae
- Genus: Bucculatrix
- Species: B. pannonica

Binomial name
- Bucculatrix pannonica Deschka, 1982

Species of moth

Bucculatrix pannonica is a species of moth in the family Bucculatricidae. It was described by G. Deschka in 1982. It is found in Austria and Slovakia.

The length of the forewings is about 4 mm.
