= Bucculatrix hypocypha =

Scientific classification
- Kingdom: Animalia
- Phylum: Arthropoda
- Clade: Pancrustacea
- Class: Insecta
- Order: Lepidoptera
- Family: Bucculatricidae
- Genus: Bucculatrix
- Species: B. hypocypha

Binomial name
- Bucculatrix hypocypha Meyrick, 1936

Species of moth

Bucculatrix hypocypha is a moth in the family Bucculatricidae. It was described in 1936 by Edward Meyrick. It is found in Taiwan.
