= Bucculatrix enceliae =

Scientific classification
- Kingdom: Animalia
- Phylum: Arthropoda
- Clade: Pancrustacea
- Class: Insecta
- Order: Lepidoptera
- Family: Bucculatricidae
- Genus: Bucculatrix
- Species: B. enceliae

Binomial name
- Bucculatrix enceliae Braun, 1963

Species of moth

Bucculatrix enceliae is a species of moth in the family Bucculatricidae. The species was described in 1963 by Annette Frances Braun. It is found in North America, where it has been recorded from California and Arizona.

The wingspan is 7–9 mm. Adults have been recorded on wing from April to May.

The larvae feed on Encelia farinosa. They mine the leaves of their host plant.
