= Bucculatrix nepalica =

Scientific classification
- Kingdom: Animalia
- Phylum: Arthropoda
- Clade: Pancrustacea
- Class: Insecta
- Order: Lepidoptera
- Family: Bucculatricidae
- Genus: Bucculatrix
- Species: B. nepalica

Binomial name
- Bucculatrix nepalica Baryshnikova, 2001

Species of moth

Bucculatrix nepalica is a moth in the family Bucculatricidae. It was described by Seksjaeva Baryshnikova in 2001. It is found in the Nepal.
