= Bucculatrix eurotiella =

Scientific classification
- Kingdom: Animalia
- Phylum: Arthropoda
- Clade: Pancrustacea
- Class: Insecta
- Order: Lepidoptera
- Family: Bucculatricidae
- Genus: Bucculatrix
- Species: B. eurotiella

Binomial name
- Bucculatrix eurotiella Walsingham, 1907

Synonyms
- Bucculatrix chrysothamni Braun, 1925

Species of moth

Bucculatrix eurotiella is a species of moth in the family Bucculatricidae. It is found in North America, where it has been recorded from California, Utah and British Columbia. It was described by Thomas de Grey, 6th Baron Walsingham in 1907.

The wingspan is 8–10 mm. Adults have been recorded on wing in May.

The larvae feed on Chrysothamnus and Senecio species.
