= Bucculatrix platyphylla =

Scientific classification
- Kingdom: Animalia
- Phylum: Arthropoda
- Clade: Pancrustacea
- Class: Insecta
- Order: Lepidoptera
- Family: Bucculatricidae
- Genus: Bucculatrix
- Species: B. platyphylla

Binomial name
- Bucculatrix platyphylla Braun, 1963

Species of moth

Bucculatrix platyphylla is a moth in the family Bucculatricidae. It was described by Annette Frances Braun in 1963 and is found in North America, where it has been recorded from New York.
