= Bucculatrix longispiralis =

Scientific classification
- Kingdom: Animalia
- Phylum: Arthropoda
- Clade: Pancrustacea
- Class: Insecta
- Order: Lepidoptera
- Family: Bucculatricidae
- Genus: Bucculatrix
- Species: B. longispiralis

Binomial name
- Bucculatrix longispiralis Baryshnikova, 2001

Species of moth

Bucculatrix longispiralis is a moth in the family Bucculatricidae. It was described in 2001 by Svetlana Vladimirovna Baryshnikova. It is found in Nepal.
