= Bucculatrix polymniae =

Scientific classification
- Kingdom: Animalia
- Phylum: Arthropoda
- Clade: Pancrustacea
- Class: Insecta
- Order: Lepidoptera
- Family: Bucculatricidae
- Genus: Bucculatrix
- Species: B. polymniae

Binomial name
- Bucculatrix polymniae Braun, 1963

Species of moth

Bucculatrix polymniae is a moth in the family Bucculatricidae. It is found in North America, where it has been recorded from Kentucky and Ohio. It was first described in 1963 by Annette Frances Braun.

The wingspan is about 6–7 mm.

The larvae feed on Polymnia uvedalia. They mine the leaves of their host plant.
