= Bucculatrix pyrenaica =

Scientific classification
- Kingdom: Animalia
- Phylum: Arthropoda
- Clade: Pancrustacea
- Class: Insecta
- Order: Lepidoptera
- Family: Bucculatricidae
- Genus: Bucculatrix
- Species: B. pyrenaica

Binomial name
- Bucculatrix pyrenaica Nel & Varenne, 2004

Species of moth

Bucculatrix pyrenaica is a moth in the family Bucculatricidae. It was described by Jacques Nel and Thierry Varenne in 2004. It is found in French Pyrenees.
