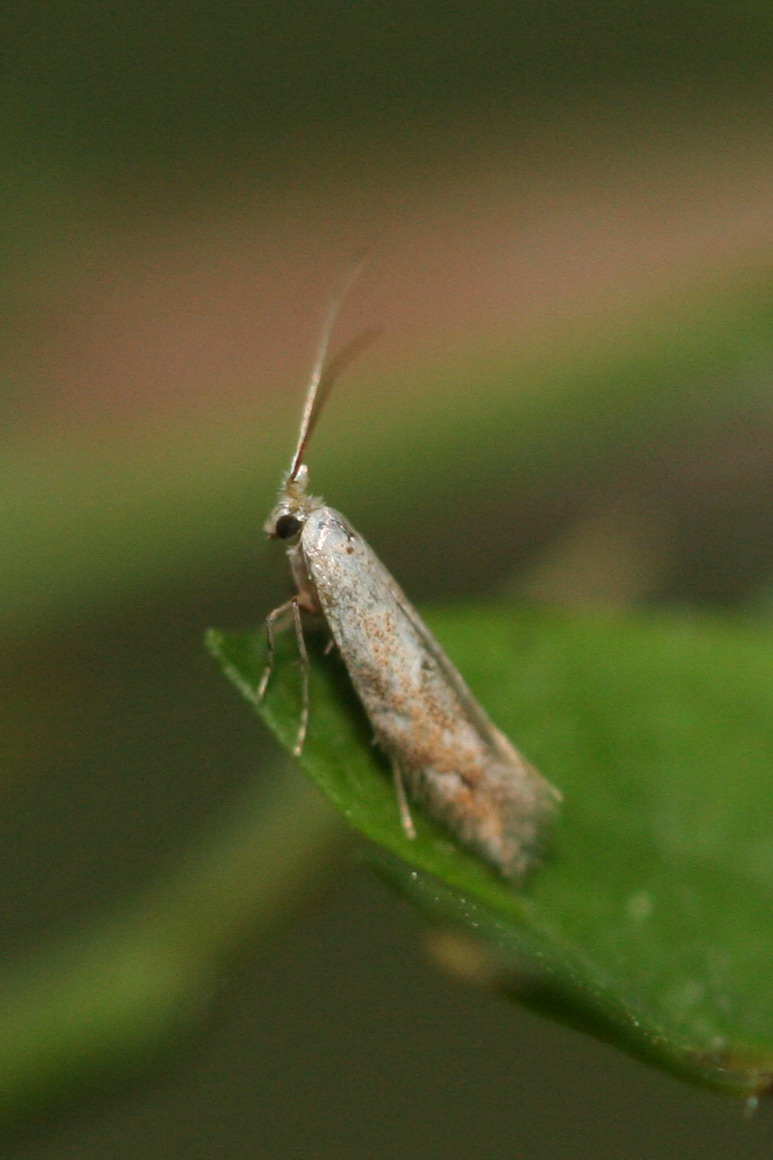

Scientific classification
- Domain: Eukaryota
- Kingdom: Animalia
- Phylum: Arthropoda
- Class: Insecta
- Order: Lepidoptera
- Infraorder: Heteroneura
- Clade: Eulepidoptera
- Clade: Ditrysia
- Superfamily: Gracillarioidea
- Family: Bucculatricidae; Wallengren, 1881
- Genus: Bucculatrix; Zeller, 1839

Diversity
- 1–3 genera and 297 species

Synonyms
- Ceroclastis Zeller, 1848

= Bucculatricidae =

Family of moths

Bucculatricidae or (Bucculatrigidae) is a family of moths. This small family has representatives in all parts of the world. Some authors place the group as a subfamily of the family Lyonetiidae.

Adults of this family are easily overlooked, being very small with narrow wings wrapped around the body at rest. When small, the larvae are leaf-miners, forming distinctive brown blotches on leaves. When larger, they usually feed on the leaves externally. Many species have specific host plants. The pupal cases have distinctive longitudinal ridges, leading to members of the family commonly being called ribbed cocoon makers.

Some authors recognize just a single large genus, Bucculatrix, although two Australian genera, Cryphioxena and the scribbly gum moths (Ogmograptis spp.) are now sometimes placed in this family rather than in Elachistidae.

== Species ==
- Bucculatrix abdita
- Bucculatrix abrepta
- Bucculatrix absinthii
- Bucculatrix acrogramma
- Bucculatrix acuta
- Bucculatrix adelpha
- Bucculatrix agilis
- Bucculatrix agnella
- Bucculatrix ainsliella
- Bucculatrix alaternella
- Bucculatrix albaciliella
- Bucculatrix albedinella
- Bucculatrix albella
- Bucculatrix albertiella
- Bucculatrix albiguttella
- Bucculatrix alpina
- Bucculatrix altera
- Bucculatrix amara
- Bucculatrix ambrosiaefoliella
- Bucculatrix amiculella
- Bucculatrix anaticula
- Bucculatrix andalusica
- Bucculatrix angustata
- Bucculatrix angustisquamella
- Bucculatrix anthemidella
- Bucculatrix anticolona
- Bucculatrix applicita
- Bucculatrix aquila
- Bucculatrix argentisignella
- Bucculatrix armata
- Bucculatrix armeniaca
- Bucculatrix arnicella
- Bucculatrix artemisiella
- Bucculatrix asphyctella
- Bucculatrix atagina
- Bucculatrix atrosignata
- Bucculatrix basifuscella
- Bucculatrix bechsteinella
- Bucculatrix benacicolella
- Bucculatrix benenotata
- Bucculatrix bicinica
- Bucculatrix bicolorella
- Bucculatrix bicristata
- Bucculatrix bifida
- Bucculatrix bisucla
- Bucculatrix brunnella
- Bucculatrix brunnescens
- Bucculatrix callistricha
- Bucculatrix canadensisella
- Bucculatrix canariensis
- Bucculatrix cantabricella
- Bucculatrix caribbea
- Bucculatrix carolinae
- Bucculatrix caspica
- Bucculatrix ceanothiella
- Bucculatrix ceibae
- Bucculatrix centroptila
- Bucculatrix cerina
- Bucculatrix chrysanthemella
- Bucculatrix cidarella
- Bucculatrix cirrhographa
- Bucculatrix citima
- Bucculatrix clavenae
- Bucculatrix clerotheta
- Bucculatrix columbiana
- Bucculatrix comporabile
- Bucculatrix coniforma
- Bucculatrix copeuta
- Bucculatrix cordiaella
- Bucculatrix coronatella
- Bucculatrix crateracma
- Bucculatrix cretica
- Bucculatrix cristatella
- Bucculatrix criticopa
- Bucculatrix cuneigera
- Bucculatrix damarana
- Bucculatrix daures
- Bucculatrix demaryella
- Bucculatrix diacapna
- Bucculatrix diffusella
- Bucculatrix disjuncta
- Bucculatrix divisa
- Bucculatrix domicola
- Bucculatrix dominatrix
- Bucculatrix dulcis
- Bucculatrix eclecta
- Bucculatrix edocta
- Bucculatrix enceliae
- Bucculatrix endospiralis
- Bucculatrix epibathra
- Bucculatrix eremospora
- Bucculatrix ericameriae
- Bucculatrix eschatias
- Bucculatrix eucalypti
- Bucculatrix eugenmaraisi
- Bucculatrix eugrapha
- Bucculatrix eupatoriella
- Bucculatrix eurotiella
- Bucculatrix evanescens
- Bucculatrix exedra
- Bucculatrix extensa
- Bucculatrix facilis
- Bucculatrix fatigatella
- Bucculatrix firmianella
- Bucculatrix flavimaculata Yagi & Hirowatari, 2024
- Bucculatrix flexuosa
- Bucculatrix floccosa
- Bucculatrix flourensiae
- Bucculatrix formosa
- Bucculatrix frangutella
- Bucculatrix franseriae
- Bucculatrix frigida
- Bucculatrix fugitans
- Bucculatrix fusicola
- Bucculatrix galeodes
- Bucculatrix galinsogae
- Bucculatrix gnaphaliella
- Bucculatrix gossypiella
- Bucculatrix gossypii
- Bucculatrix gossypina
- Bucculatrix hackeri
- Bucculatrix hagnopis
- Bucculatrix hamaboella
- Bucculatrix helichrysella
- Bucculatrix herbalbella
- Bucculatrix hobohmi
- Bucculatrix humiliella
- Bucculatrix hypocypha
- Bucculatrix hypsiphila
- Bucculatrix ilecella
- Bucculatrix illecebrosa
- Bucculatrix immaculatella
- Bucculatrix improvisa
- Bucculatrix inchoata
- Bucculatrix increpata
- Bucculatrix infans
- Bucculatrix insolita
- Bucculatrix instigata
- Bucculatrix inusitata
- Bucculatrix iranica
- Bucculatrix ivella
- Bucculatrix jiblahensis
- Bucculatrix kendalli
- Bucculatrix khomasi
- Bucculatrix kimballi
- Bucculatrix kirkspriggsi
- Bucculatrix koebelella
- Bucculatrix kogii
- Bucculatrix laciniatella
- Bucculatrix lassella
- Bucculatrix latella
- Bucculatrix latviaella
- Bucculatrix lavaterella
- Bucculatrix lenis
- Bucculatrix leptalea
- Bucculatrix litigiosella
- Bucculatrix locuples
- Bucculatrix longispiralis
- Bucculatrix longula
- Bucculatrix lovtsovae
- Bucculatrix loxoptila
- Bucculatrix lustrella
- Bucculatrix lutaria
- Bucculatrix luteella
- Bucculatrix magnella
- Bucculatrix makabana
- Bucculatrix malivorella
- Bucculatrix maritima
- Bucculatrix mehadiensis
- Bucculatrix melipecta
- Bucculatrix mellita
- Bucculatrix mendax
- Bucculatrix mesoporphyra
- Bucculatrix micropunctata
- Bucculatrix mirnae
- Bucculatrix monelpis
- Bucculatrix montana
- Bucculatrix muraseae
- Bucculatrix myricae
- Bucculatrix nebulosa
- Bucculatrix needhami
- Bucculatrix nepalica
- Bucculatrix nigricomella
- Bucculatrix nigripunctella
- Bucculatrix nigrovalvata
- Bucculatrix niveella
- Bucculatrix noltei
- Bucculatrix nota
- Bucculatrix notella
- Bucculatrix ochristrigella
- Bucculatrix ochrisuffusa
- Bucculatrix ochritincta
- Bucculatrix ochromeris
- Bucculatrix oncota
- Bucculatrix oppositella
- Bucculatrix orophilella
- Bucculatrix packardella
- Bucculatrix paliuricola
- Bucculatrix pallidula
- Bucculatrix pannonica
- Bucculatrix parasimilis
- Bucculatrix paroptila
- Bucculatrix parthenica
- Bucculatrix parvinotata
- Bucculatrix pectinella
- Bucculatrix pectinifera
- Bucculatrix perfixa
- Bucculatrix pertusella
- Bucculatrix phagnalella
- Bucculatrix platyphylla
- Bucculatrix plucheae
- Bucculatrix polymniae
- Bucculatrix polytita
- Bucculatrix pomifoliella
- Bucculatrix porthmis
- Bucculatrix praecipua
- Bucculatrix pseudosylvella
- Bucculatrix ptochastis
- Bucculatrix pyrenaica
- Bucculatrix pyrivorella
- Bucculatrix quadrigemina
- Bucculatrix quieta
- Bucculatrix quinquenotella
- Bucculatrix ramallahensis
- Bucculatrix ratisbonensis
- Bucculatrix recognita
- Bucculatrix regaella
- Bucculatrix rhamniella
- Bucculatrix ruficoma
- Bucculatrix saccharata
- Bucculatrix sagax
- Bucculatrix salutatoria
- Bucculatrix sanaaensis
- Bucculatrix santolinella
- Bucculatrix seneciensis
- Bucculatrix seorsa
- Bucculatrix separabilis
- Bucculatrix serratella
- Bucculatrix sexnotata
- Bucculatrix similis
- Bucculatrix simulans
- Bucculatrix sinevi
- Bucculatrix solidaginiella
- Bucculatrix sororcula
- Bucculatrix speciosa
- Bucculatrix spectabilis
- Bucculatrix sphaeralceae
- Bucculatrix splendida
- Bucculatrix sporobolella
- Bucculatrix staintonella
- Bucculatrix statica
- Bucculatrix stictopus
- Bucculatrix subnitens
- Bucculatrix taeniola
- Bucculatrix tanymorpha
- Bucculatrix telavivella
- Bucculatrix tenebricosa
- Bucculatrix tetanota
- Bucculatrix tetradymiae
- Bucculatrix thoracella
- Bucculatrix thurberiella
- Bucculatrix transversata
- Bucculatrix transversella
- Bucculatrix tridenticola
- Bucculatrix trifasciella
- Bucculatrix tsurubamella
- Bucculatrix tubulosa
- Bucculatrix ulmella
- Bucculatrix ulmicola
- Bucculatrix ulmifoliae
- Bucculatrix ulocarena
- Bucculatrix unipuncta
- Bucculatrix univoca
- Bucculatrix ussurica
- Bucculatrix varia
- Bucculatrix variabilis
- Bucculatrix verax
- Bucculatrix viguierae
- Bucculatrix wittnebeni
- Bucculatrix xanthophylla
- Bucculatrix xenaula
- Bucculatrix yemenitica
- Bucculatrix zizyphella
- Bucculatrix zophopasta

== Status unclear ==
- Bucculatrix acerifolia Heinrich, 1937 (described from Germany)
- Bucculatrix acerifoliae Heinrich, 1937 (described from Switzerland)
- Bucculatrix auripicta Matsumura, 1931 (described from Japan)
- Bucculatrix helianthemi (=Dichomeris helianthemi?) (recorded food plant: Helianthemum sessiliflorum)
- Bucculatrix imitatella Herrich-Schäffer, 1855
- Bucculatrix turatii Standfuss, 1887 (recorded food plant: Paliurus aculeatus)
