= Bucculatrix litigiosella =

Scientific classification
- Kingdom: Animalia
- Phylum: Arthropoda
- Clade: Pancrustacea
- Class: Insecta
- Order: Lepidoptera
- Family: Bucculatricidae
- Genus: Bucculatrix
- Species: B. litigiosella

Binomial name
- Bucculatrix litigiosella Zeller, 1875

Species of moth

Bucculatrix litigiosella is a moth in the family Bucculatricidae. It was described by Philipp Christoph Zeller in 1875. It is found in North America, where it has been recorded from Texas.
