= Bucculatrix albaciliella =

Scientific classification
- Kingdom: Animalia
- Phylum: Arthropoda
- Clade: Pancrustacea
- Class: Insecta
- Order: Lepidoptera
- Family: Bucculatricidae
- Genus: Bucculatrix
- Species: B. albaciliella

Binomial name
- Bucculatrix albaciliella Braun, 1910

Species of moth

Bucculatrix albaciliella is a moth in the family Bucculatricidae first described by Annette Frances Braun in 1910. It is found in California.

The wingspan is 8–9 mm. Adults have been recorded on wing in April.
