= Bucculatrix serratella =

Scientific classification
- Kingdom: Animalia
- Phylum: Arthropoda
- Clade: Pancrustacea
- Class: Insecta
- Order: Lepidoptera
- Family: Bucculatricidae
- Genus: Bucculatrix
- Species: B. serratella

Binomial name
- Bucculatrix serratella Kobayashi, Hirowatari & Kuroko, 2010

Species of moth

Bucculatrix serratella is a moth in the family Bucculatricidae. It was described by KShigeki Kobayashi, Toshiya Hirowatari and Hiroshi Kuroko in 2010. It is found in Japan (Honshu).
