= Bucculatrix eugrapha =

Scientific classification
- Kingdom: Animalia
- Phylum: Arthropoda
- Clade: Pancrustacea
- Class: Insecta
- Order: Lepidoptera
- Family: Bucculatricidae
- Genus: Bucculatrix
- Species: B. eugrapha

Binomial name
- Bucculatrix eugrapha Braun, 1963

Species of moth

Bucculatrix eugrapha is a moth in the family Bucculatricidae. It is found in North America, where it has been recorded from Ontario. It was described by Annette Frances Braun in 1963.

The wingspan is about 8 mm. The forewings are brown, with whitish marks. The hindwings are dark.
