= Bucculatrix perfixa =

Scientific classification
- Kingdom: Animalia
- Phylum: Arthropoda
- Clade: Pancrustacea
- Class: Insecta
- Order: Lepidoptera
- Family: Bucculatricidae
- Genus: Bucculatrix
- Species: B. perfixa

Binomial name
- Bucculatrix perfixa Meyrick, 1915

Species of moth

Bucculatrix perfixa is a moth of the family Bucculatricidae. It was first described in 1915 by Edward Meyrick and is found in Australia.
