= Bucculatrix wittnebeni =

Scientific classification
- Kingdom: Animalia
- Phylum: Arthropoda
- Clade: Pancrustacea
- Class: Insecta
- Order: Lepidoptera
- Family: Bucculatricidae
- Genus: Bucculatrix
- Species: B. wittnebeni

Binomial name
- Bucculatrix wittnebeni Mey, 2004

Species of moth

Bucculatrix wittnebeni is a moth in the family Bucculatricidae. It is found in Namibia. It was described in 2004 by Wolfram Mey.
