= Bucculatrix pertusella =

Scientific classification
- Kingdom: Animalia
- Phylum: Arthropoda
- Clade: Pancrustacea
- Class: Insecta
- Order: Lepidoptera
- Family: Bucculatricidae
- Genus: Bucculatrix
- Species: B. pertusella

Binomial name
- Bucculatrix pertusella Zeller, 1877

Species of moth

Bucculatrix pertusella is a moth in the family Bucculatricidae. It was described by Philipp Christoph Zeller in 1877 and is found in Colombia.
