= Bucculatrix angustisquamella =

Scientific classification
- Kingdom: Animalia
- Phylum: Arthropoda
- Clade: Pancrustacea
- Class: Insecta
- Order: Lepidoptera
- Family: Bucculatricidae
- Genus: Bucculatrix
- Species: B. angustisquamella

Binomial name
- Bucculatrix angustisquamella Braun, 1925

Species of moth

Bucculatrix angustisquamella is a moth in the family Bucculatricidae. It is found in North America, where it has been recorded from Utah and British Columbia. The species was first described in 1925 by Annette Frances Braun.

The wingspan is 7.5–8 mm.
