= Bucculatrix telavivella =

Scientific classification
- Kingdom: Animalia
- Phylum: Arthropoda
- Clade: Pancrustacea
- Class: Insecta
- Order: Lepidoptera
- Family: Bucculatricidae
- Genus: Bucculatrix
- Species: B. telavivella

Binomial name
- Bucculatrix telavivella Amsel, 1935

Species of moth

Bucculatrix telavivella is a moth in the family Bucculatricidae. It was described by Hans Georg Amsel in 1935. It is found in Italy, the Kaliningrad region and Israel.
