= Bucculatrix epibathra =

Scientific classification
- Kingdom: Animalia
- Phylum: Arthropoda
- Clade: Pancrustacea
- Class: Insecta
- Order: Lepidoptera
- Family: Bucculatricidae
- Genus: Bucculatrix
- Species: B. epibathra

Binomial name
- Bucculatrix epibathra Meyrick, 1934

Species of moth

Bucculatrix epibathra is a moth in the family Bucculatricidae. It is found in India. It was first described in 1934 by Edward Meyrick.
