= Bucculatrix armata =

Scientific classification
- Kingdom: Animalia
- Phylum: Arthropoda
- Clade: Pancrustacea
- Class: Insecta
- Order: Lepidoptera
- Family: Bucculatricidae
- Genus: Bucculatrix
- Species: B. armata

Binomial name
- Bucculatrix armata Seksjaeva, 1989

Species of moth

Bucculatrix armata is a moth in the family Bucculatricidae. It was described by Svetlana Seksjaeva in 1989. It is found in the Russian Far East (Primorsky Krai) and Japan (Hokkaido).

The larvae feed on Tilia japonica. They mine the leaves of their host plant.
