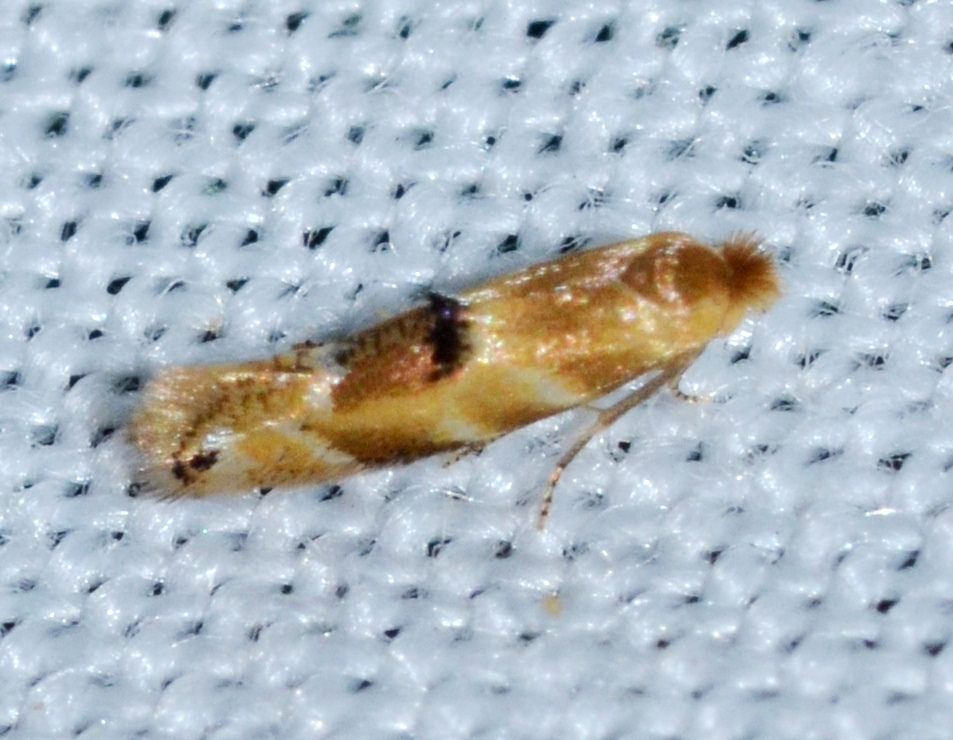

Scientific classification
- Kingdom: Animalia
- Phylum: Arthropoda
- Clade: Pancrustacea
- Class: Insecta
- Order: Lepidoptera
- Family: Bucculatricidae
- Genus: Bucculatrix
- Species: B. coronatella

Binomial name
- Bucculatrix coronatella Clemens, 1860

= Bucculatrix coronatella =

Species of moth

Bucculatrix coronatella is a moth in the family Bucculatricidae. The species was described in 1860 by James Brackenridge Clemens. It is found in North America, where it has been recorded from Alabama, Georgia, Indiana, Kentucky, Maine, Maryland, Massachusetts, New Jersey, Ohio, Oklahoma, Ontario, Pennsylvania, South Carolina, Tennessee, Virginia, Washington, D.C., and West Virginia.
