= Bucculatrix mehadiensis =

Scientific classification
- Kingdom: Animalia
- Phylum: Arthropoda
- Clade: Pancrustacea
- Class: Insecta
- Order: Lepidoptera
- Family: Bucculatricidae
- Genus: Bucculatrix
- Species: B. mehadiensis

Binomial name
- Bucculatrix mehadiensis Rebel, 1903

Species of moth

Bucculatrix mehadiensis is a moth in the family Bucculatricidae. It was described by Hans Rebel in 1903. It is found in Romania.

The wingspan is 7–7.3 mm. The forewings are white with three black marks The hindwings are blackish-grey.
