= List of moths of Japan (Micropterigoidea-Yponomeutoidea) =

Partial list of Japanese moths

This is a list of the Japanese species of the superfamilies Micropterigoidea, Nepticuloidea, Adeloidea, Tischerioidea, Tineoidea, Gracillarioidea and Yponomeutoidea. It also acts as an index to the species articles and forms part of the full List of moths of Japan.

== Micropterigidae ==
- モンフタオビコバネ — Micropterix aureatella (Scopoli, 1763)
- ムモンコバネ — Paramartyria immaculatella Issiki, 1931
- マエモンコバネ — Paramartyria semifasciella Issiki, 1931
- 和名未定 — Issikiomartyria akemiae Hashimoto, 2006
- 和名未定 — Issikiomartyria bisegmentata Hashimoto, 2006
- 和名未定 — Issikiomartyria distincta Hashimoto, 2006
- シロウマヒロコバネ — Issikiomartyria nudata (Issiki, 1953)
- 和名未定 — Issikiomartyria plicata Hashimoto, 2006
- 和名未定 — Kurokopteryx dolichocerata Hashimoto, 2006
- サンダンキョウヒロコバネ — Neomicropteryx bifurca Issiki, 1953
- イシヅチヒロコバネ — Neomicropteryx cornuta Issiki, 1953
- ツルギヒロコバネ — Neomicropteryx elongata Issiki, 1953
- カズサヒロコバネ — Neomicropteryx kazusana Hashimoto, 1992
- 和名未定 — Neomicropteryx kiwana Hashimoto, 2006
- マツムラヒロコバネ — Neomicropteryx matsumurana Issiki, 1931
- ニッポンヒロコバネ — Neomicropteryx nipponensis Issiki, 1931
- 和名未定 — Neomicropteryx redacta Hashimoto, 2006

== Eriocraniidae ==
- ムラサキマダラスイコバネ — Eriocrania komaii Mizukawa, Hirowatari & Hashimoto, 2006
- ハンノキスイコバネ — Eriocrania sakhalinella Kozlov, 1983
- オオスイコバネ — Eriocrania semipurpurella semipurpurella (Stephens, 1835)
- キンマダラスイコバネ — Eriocrania sparrmannella (Bosc, 1791)
- イッシキスイコバネ — Issikiocrania japonicella Moriuti, 1982

== Hepialidae ==
- チシマシロスジコウモリ — Gazoryctra chishimana (Matsumura, 1931)
- オオギンスジコウモリ — Gazoryctra macilentus spinifera Tshistjakov, 1997
- シロテンコウモリ — Palpifer sexnotatus niphonicus (Butler, 1879)
- キタコウモリ — Pharmacis fusconebulosa askoldensis (Staudinger, 1887)
- ウスイロコウモリ — Thitarodes nipponensis Ueda, 1996
- ヒメコウモリ — Thitarodes variabilis (Bremer, 1861)
- キンスジコウモリ — Phymatopus japonicus Inoue, 1982
- コウモリガ — Endoclita excrescens (Butler, 1877)
- キマダラコウモリ — Endoclita sinensis (Moore, 1877)

== Nepticulidae ==
- オオイシチビガ — Trifurcula oishiella Matsumura, 1931
- 和名未定 — Stigmella acrochaetia Kemperman & Wilkinson, 1985
- クヌギクロモグリチビガ — Stigmella aladina Puplesis, 1984
- 和名未定 — Stigmella alaurulenta Kemperman & Wilkinson, 1985
- イチゴモグリチビガ — Stigmella alikurokoi Kemperman & Wilkinson, 1985
- シラカバモグリチビガ — Stigmella betulicola (Stainton, 1856)
- コアカソモグリチビガ — Stigmella boehmeriae Kemperman & Wilkinson, 1985
- アカガシモグリチビガ — Stigmella caesurifasciella Kemperman & Wilkinson, 1985
- シイモグリチビガ — Stigmella castanopsiella (Kuroko, 1978)
- イヌシデモグリチビガ — Stigmella cathepostis Kemperman & Wilkinson, 1985
- クサボケモグリチビガ — Stigmella chaenomelae Kemperman & Wilkinson, 1985
- クヌギギンモグリチビガ — Stigmella chrysopterella Kemperman & Wilkinson, 1985
- 和名未定 — Stigmella clisiotophora Kemperman & Wilkinson, 1985
- ハンノモグリチビガ — Stigmella conchyliata Kemperman & Wilkinson, 1985
- カシワモグリチビガ — Stigmella dentatae Puplesis, 1984
- エゴノモグリチビガ — Stigmella egonokii Kemperman & Wilkinson, 1985
- ズグロモグリチビガ — Stigmella fumida Kemperman & Wilkinson, 1985
- ギンモンモグリチビガ — Stigmella gimmonella (Matsumura, 1931)
- キオビシイモグリチビガ — Stigmella hisaii Kuroko, 2004
- リンゴクロモグリチビガ — Stigmella honshui Kemperman & Wilkinson, 1985
- イチゴアカガネモグリチビガ — Stigmella ichigoiella Kemperman & Wilkinson, 1985
- クナシリモグリチビガ — Stigmella kurilensis Puplesis, 1987
- クヌギモグリチビガ — Stigmella kurokoi Puplesis, 1984
- クロツバラモグリチビガ — Stigmella kurotsubarai Kemperman & Wilkinson, 1985
- 和名未定 — Stigmella nakamurai Kemperman & Wilkinson, 1985
- 和名未定 — Stigmella nireae Kemperman & Wilkinson, 1985
- ギンスジモグリチビガ — Stigmella oa Kemperman & Wilkinson, 1985
- 和名未定 — Stigmella omelkoi Puplesis, 1984
- チヂミザサモグリチビガ — Stigmella oplismeniella Kemperman & Wilkinson, 1985
- ヤクシマモグリチビガ — Stigmella orientalis Kemperman & Wilkinson, 1985
- 和名未定 — Stigmella populnea Kemperman & Wilkinson, 1985
- 和名未定 — Stigmella sesplicata Kemperman & Wilkinson, 1985
- ウラジロノキモグリチビガ — Stigmella sorbivora Kemperman & Wilkinson, 1985
- イチゴギンモグリチビガ — Stigmella spiculifera Kemperman & Wilkinson, 1985
- 和名未定 — Stigmella titivillitia Kemperman & Wilkinson, 1985
- 和名未定 — Stigmella tranocrossa Kemperman & Wilkinson, 1985
- シスジチビガ — Stigmella trifasciata (Matsumura, 1931)
- イタヤモグリチビガ — Stigmella ultima Puplesis, 1984
- ヤナギモグリチビガ — Stigmella vittata Kemperman & Wilkinson, 1985
- ケヤキモグリチビガ — Stigmella zelkoviella Kemperman & Wilkinson, 1985
- ズミモグリチビガ — Stigmella zumii Kemperman & Wilkinson, 1985
- 和名未定 — Bohemannia manschurella Puplesis, 1984
- 和名未定 — Bohemannia nubila Puplesis, 1985
- 和名未定 — Ectoedemia admiranda Puplesis, 1984
- 和名未定 — Ectoedemia amani Svensson, 1966
- ハイイロモグリチビガ — Ectoedemia arisi Puplesis, 1984
- オトギリモグリチビガ — Ectoedemia hypericifolia (Kuroko, 1982)
- 和名未定 — Ectoedemia occultiella (Linnaeus, 1767)
- 和名未定 — Ectoedemia olivina Puplesis, 1984
- 和名未定 — Ectoedemia pilosae Puplesis, 1984
- 和名未定 — Ectoedemia scoblei Puplesis, 1984
- コケモモチビモグリガ — Ectoedemia weaveri (Stainton, 1855)
- Ectoedemia cerviparadisicola Sato, 2012
- フタテンオビモグリチビガ — Etainia capesella (Puplesis, 1985)
- キイロモグリチビガ — Etainia peterseni Puplesis, 1985
- トラフモグリチビガ — Etainia tigrinella (Puplesis, 1985)

== Opostegidae ==
- シロヒラタモグリガ — Opostegoides albellus Sinev, 1990
- ミノドヒラタモグリガ — Opostegoides minodensis (Kuroko, 1982)
- ツマキヒラタモグリガ — Opostegoides omelkoi Kozlov, 1985
- 和名未定 — Eosopostega issikii Davis, 1989
- ヒメヒラタモグリガ — Pseudopostega auritella (Hübner, [1813])
- ツマスジヒラタモグリガ — Pseudopostega crepusculella (Zeller, 1839)

== Heliozelidae ==
- ムラサキツヤコガ — Tyriozela porphyrogona Meyrick, 1931
- ミヤマツヤコガ — Heliozela angulata Lee, Hirowatari & Kuroko, 2006
- ウストビツヤコガ — Heliozela biprominens Lee, Hirowatari & Kuroko, 2006
- トビイロツヤコガ — Heliozela brevitalea Lee, Hirowatari & Kuroko, 2006
- クリチビツヤコガ — Heliozela castaneella Kuroko, 1982
- カツラギツヤコガ — Heliozela glabrata Lee, Hirowatari & Kuroko, 2006
- アシオビツヤコガ — Heliozela limbata Lee, Hirowatari & Kuroko, 2006
- ツヤコガ — Heliozela subpurpurea Meyrick, 1934
- ブドウツヤコガ — Antispila ampelopsia Kuroko, 1961
- サカキツヤコガ — Antispila cleyerella Lee, 2006
- ミズキツヤコガ — Antispila corniella Kuroko, 1961
- 和名未定 — Antispila distyliella Lee, Hirowatari & Kuroko, 2006
- キンモンツヤコガ — Antispila hikosana Kuroko, 1961
- アジサイツヤコガ — Antispila hydrangifoliella Kuroko, 1961
- オオブドウキンモンツヤコガ — Antispila inouei Kuroko, 1987
- 和名未定 — Antispila iviella Kuroko, 1961
- チビブドウツヤコガ — Antispila orbiculella Kuroko, 1961
- ムラサキミズキツヤコガ — Antispila purplella Kuroko, 1961
- 和名未定 — Antispila tateshinensis Kuroko, 1987
- ブドウキンモンツヤコガ — Antispila uenoi Kuroko, 1987

== Adelidae ==
- ムモンケブカヒゲナガ — Adela luminaris Hirowatari, 1997
- アトキケブカヒゲナガ — Adela luteocilis Hirowatari, 1997
- ケブカヒゲナガ — Adela praepilosa Hirowatari, 1997
- ミドリヒゲナガ — Adela reaumurella (Linnaeus, 1758)
- コンオビヒゲナガ — Nemophora ahenea Stringer, 1930
- クロハネシロヒゲナガ — Nemophora albiantennella Issiki, 1930
- オオヒゲナガ — Nemophora amatella (Staudinger, 1892)
- ギンヒゲナガ — Nemophora askoldella (Millière, 1879)
- ホソオビヒゲナガ — Nemophora aurifera (Butler, 1881)
- キオビコヒゲナガ — Nemophora bifasciatella Issiki, 1930
- ヤマキヒゲナガ — Nemophora japonica Stringer, 1930
- カラフトヒゲナガ北海道亜種 — Nemophora karafutonis karafutonis (Matsumura, 1932)
- カラフトヒゲナガ本州以南亜種 — Nemophora karafutonis moriokensis (Okano, 1957)
- 和名未定 — Nemophora lapikella Kozlov, 1997
- イナズマヒゲナガ — Nemophora magnifica Kozlov, 1997
- アマミヒゲナガ — Nemophora marisella Kozlov & Hirowatari, 1997
- ツマモンヒゲナガ — Nemophora ochsenheimerella (Hübner, [1813])
- ギンスジヒゲナガ — Nemophora optima (Butler, 1878)
- ヒロオビヒゲナガ — Nemophora paradisea (Butler, 1881)
- タイワンオオヒゲナガ — Nemophora polychorda (Meyrick, 1914)
- リュウキュウクロヒゲナガ — Nemophora pruinosa Hirowatari, 2005
- ゴマフヒゲナガ — Nemophora raddei (Rebel, 1901)
- ベニオビヒゲナガ — Nemophora rubrofascia (Christoph, 1882)
- アキヨシヒゲナガ — Nemophora smaragdaspis (Meyrick, 1924)
- ウスベニヒゲナガ — Nemophora staudingerella (Christoph, 1881)
- ギンスジコヒゲナガ — Nemophora stellata Hirowatari, 1995
- ミヤマコヒゲナガ — Nemophora sylvatica Hirowatari, 1995
- 和名未定 — Nemophora takamukuella (Matsumura, 1932)
- ウスオビコヒゲナガ — Nemophora tenuifasciata Hirowatari, 2005
- ホソフタオビヒゲナガ — Nemophora trimetrella Stringer, 1930
- キオビクロヒゲナガ — Nemophora umbripennis Stringer, 1930
- ワカヤマヒゲナガ — Nemophora wakayamensis (Matsumura, 1931)
- ウスキヒゲナガ — Nematopogon distinctus Yasuda, 1957
- アトボシウスキヒゲナガ — Nematopogon dorsigutellus (Erschoff, 1877)
- ゴマフヒメウスキヒゲナガ — Nematopogon robertellus (Clerck, 1759)

== Prodoxidae ==
- アルタイマガリガ — Lampronia altaica Zagulajev, 1992
- キマダラマガリガ — Lampronia corticella (Linnaeus, 1758)
- フタオビマガリガ — Lampronia flavimitrella (Hübner, [1817])
- ヘリモンマガリガ — Greya marginimaculata (Issiki, 1957)
- アラスカマガリガ — Greya variabilis Davis & Pellmyr, 1992

== Incurvariidae ==
- ヒメフタオビマガリガ — Phylloporia bistrigella (Haworth, 1828)
- ホソバネマガリガ — Vespina nielseni Kozlov, 1987
- ウスキンモンマガリガ — Procacitas orientella (Kozlov, 1987)
- フタモンマガリガ — Alloclemensia maculata Nielsen, 1981
- ヒトスジマガリガ — Alloclemensia unifasciata Nielsen, 1981
- タカネマガリガ — Excurvaria praelatella ([Denis & Schiffermüller], 1775)
- ムラサキツヤマガリガ — Paraclemensia caerulea (Issiki, 1957)
- ヒメアオマガリガ — Paraclemensia cyanea Nielsen, 1982
- クロツヤマガリガ — Paraclemensia incerta (Christoph, 1882)
- アズキナシマガリガ — Paraclemensia monospina Nielsen, 1982
- クリヒメマガリガ — Paraclemensia oligospina Nielsen, 1982
- イヌシデマガリガ — Paraclemensia viridis Nielsen, 1982
- ハンノキマガリガ — Incurvaria alniella (Issiki, 1957)
- クシヒゲマガリガ — Incurvaria takeuchii Issiki, 1957
- コケモモマガリガ — Incurvaria vetulella (Zetterstedt, 1839)

== Tischeriidae ==
- ニセクヌギキハモグリガ — Tischeria decidua Wocke, 1876
- 和名未定 — Tischeria naraensis Sato, 1993
- クヌギキハモグリガ — Tischeria quercifolia Kuroko, 1982
- バラクロハモグリガ — Emmetia angusticollella (Duponchel, 1843)
- キイチゴクロハモグリガ — Emmetia heinemanni (Wocke, 1871)
- ワレモコウツヤハモグリガ本州以南亜種 — Emmetia szoecsi japonica (Kuroko, 1982)
- ワレモコウツヤハモグリガ北海道亜種 — Emmetia szoecsi szoecsi (Kasy, 1961)
- 和名未定 — Coptotriche japoniella Puplesis and Diskus, 2003

== Tineidae ==
- クシヒゲキヒロズコガ — Pelecystola strigosa (Moore, 1888)
- ナガバヒロズコガ — Cephitinea colonella (Erschoff, 1874)
- マダラマルハヒロズコガ — Gaphara conspersa (Matsumura, 1931)
- クロクモヒロズコガ — Psecadioides aspersus Butler, 1881
- アトスカシモンヒロズコガ — Gerontha borea Moriuti, 1977
- ハチノスヒロズコガ — Cephimallota chasanica (Zagulajev, 1965)
- 和名未定 — Liopycnas percnombra Meyrick, 1937
- 和名未定 — Micrerethista denticulata Davis, 1998
- クロスジキヒロズコガ — Tineovertex melanochryseus (Meyrick, 1911)
- コケヒロズコガ — Eudarcia orbiculidomus (Sakai & Saigusa, 1999)
- オオヒロズコガ — Scardia amurensis Zagulajev, 1965
- 和名未定 — Amorophaga japonica Robinson, 1986
- アトモンヒロズコガ — Morophaga bucephala (Snellen, 1884)
- 和名未定 — Morophaga choragella ([Denis & Schiffermüller], 1775)
- ウスマダラオオヒロズコガ — Morophaga fasciculata Robinson, 1986
- 和名未定 — Morophaga formosana Robinson, 1986
- サカイヒロズコガ — Morophaga iriomotensis Robinson, 1986
- シイタケオオヒロズコガ — Morophagoides moriutii Robinson, 1986
- 和名未定 — Montescardia kurenzovi (Zagulajev, 1966)
- マエモンヒロズコガ — Dinica endochrysa (Meyrick, 1935)
- ウスグロコクガ — Haplotinea insectella (Fabricius, 1794)
- 和名未定 — Nemapogon gerasimovi Zagulajev, 1961
- コクガ — Nemapogon granella (Linnaeus, 1758)
- シラホシミヤマヒロズコガ — Triaxomera puncticulata Miyamoto, Hirowatari & Yamamoto, 2002
- ハイイロスカシモンヒロズコガ — Crypsithyris cana Sakai & Saigusa, 2002
- クロモンチビヒロズコガ — Crypsithyris crococoma Meyrick, 1934
- ウスグロスカシモンヒロズコガ — Crypsithyris japonica Petersen & Gaedike, 1993
- コガタスカシモンヒロズコガ — Crypsithyris saigusai Gaedike, 2000
- ジュウタンガ — Trichophaga tapetzella (Linnaeus, 1758)
- ウスグロイガ — Niditinea baryspilas (Meyrick, 1937)
- クロスジイガ — Niditinea striolella (Matsumura, 1931)
- コイガ — Tineola bisselliella (Hummel, 1823)
- トリノフンヒロズコガ — Tinea columbariella Wocke, 1877
- 和名未定 — Tinea protograpta Meyrick, 1935
- イガ — Tinea translucens Meyrick, 1917
- 和名未定 — Tinea trapezoides Meyrick, 1935
- アトキヒロズコガ — Monopis flavidorsalis (Matsumura, 1931)
- マエモンクロヒロズコガ — Monopis pavlovskii (Zagulajev, 1955)
- 和名未定 — Ceratosticha leptodeta Meyrick, 1935
- デコボコヒロズコガ — Dasyses barbata (Christoph, 1881)
- コブヒロズコガ — Dasyses rugosella (Stainton, 1859)
- アトボシメンコガ — Wegneria cerodelta (Meyrick, 1911)
- クロエリメンコガ — Opogona nipponica Stringer, 1930
- クロテンオオメンコガ — Opogona sacchari (Bojer, 1856)
- モトキメンコガ — Opogona thiadelpha Meyrick, 1934
- ヒメツマオレガ — Dryadaula epischista (Meyrick, 1936)
- クロスジツマオレガ — Erechthias atririvis (Meyrick, 1931)
- チビツマオレガ — Erechthias ioloxa (Meyrick, 1936)
- 和名未定 — Erechthias itoi Moriuti & Kadohara, 1994
- ウスモンツマオレガ — Erechthias sphenoschista (Meyrick, 1931)
- 和名未定 — Erechthias zebrina (Butler, 1881)
- マダラシロツマオレガ — Comodica contributa (Meyrick, 1932)
- 和名未定 — Comodica saitoi Moriuti & Kadohara, 1994
- 和名未定 — Pyloetis mimosae (Stainton, 1859)
- ウスバヒロズコガ — Psychoides phaedrospora (Meyrick, 1935)

== Galacticidae ==
- ネムスガ — Homadaula anisocentra Meyrick, 1922

== Psychidae ==
- 和名未定 — Diplodoma herminata (Geoffroy, 1785)
- 和名未定 — Trigonodoma japonica Sugimoto & Saigusa, 2004
- シロテンチビミノガ — Paranarychia albomaculatella Saigusa, 1961
- 和名未定 — Anatolopsyche stylifera Sugimoto & Saigusa, 2003
- ウスシロテンチビミノガ — Siederia listerella (Linnaeus, 1758)
- 和名未定 — Dahlica parthenogenesis (Saigusa, 1961)
- アマリチビミノガ — Taleporia amariensis Saigusa, 1961
- クロチビミノガ — Taleporia nigropterella Saigusa, 1961
- トガリチビミノガ — Taleporia shosenkyoensis Saigusa, 1961
- ハイイロチビミノガ — Taleporia trichopterella Saigusa, 1961
- ナツノチビミノガ — Kozhantshikovia aestivalis Saigusa, 1961
- ハルノチビミノガ — Kozhantshikovia vernalis Saigusa, 1961
- 和名未定 — Eumasia muscella Saigusa & Sugimoto, 2005
- 和名未定 — Eumasia viridilichenella Saigusa & Sugimoto, 2005
- アキノヒメミノガ — Bacotia sakabei Seino, 1981
- ヒメミノガ — Psyche niphonica (Hori, 1926)
- アシシロマルバネミノガ — Manatha taiwana (Sonan, 1935)
- 和名未定 — Eumeta kiushiuana (Yazaki, 1926)
- チャミノガ — Eumeta minuscula Butler, 1881
- オオミノガ — Eumeta variegata (Snellen, 1879)
- キタクロミノガ — Canephora pungelerii (Heylaerts, 1900)
- オオキタクロミノガ — Canephora unicolor (Hufnagel, 1766)
- シバミノガ — Nipponopsyche fuscescens Yazaki, 1926
- コンドウシロミノガ — Chalioides kondonis Kondo, 1922
- ネグロミノガ — Acanthopsyche nigraplaga (Wileman, 1911)
- ニトベミノガ — Mahasena aurea (Butler, 1881)
- トミナガクロミノガ — Striglocyrbasia meguae Sugimoto & Saigusa, 2001

== Amphitheridae ==
- アトキヒカリバコガ — Roeslerstammia erxlebella bella Moriuti, 1982
- ムジヒカリバコガ — Roeslerstammia pronubella nitidella Moriuti, 1972
- ヨツメナガヒゲガ — Telethera blepharacma Meyrick, 1913
- ホルトノキナガヒゲガ — Agriothera elaeocarpophaga Moriuti, 1978

== Bucculatricidae ==
- Bucculatrix altera Seksjaeva, 1989
- Bucculatrix armata Seksjaeva, 1989
- Bucculatrix cidarella (Zeller, 1839)
- クロツバラチビガ — Bucculatrix citima Seksjaeva, 1992
- Bucculatrix comporabile Seksjaeva, 1989
- Bucculatrix demaryella (Duponchel, 1840)
- Bucculatrix exedra Meyrick, 1915
- アオギリチビガ — Bucculatrix firmianella Kuroko, 1982
- Bucculatrix hamaboella Kobayashi, Hirowatari & Kuroko, 2009
- Bucculatrix kogii Kobayashi, Hirowatari & Kuroko, 2010
- Bucculatrix laciniatella Benander, 1931
- Bucculatrix maritima Stainton, 1851
- Bucculatrix muraseae Kobayashi, Hirowatari & Kuroko, 2010
- Bucculatrix notella Seksjaeva, 1996
- Bucculatrix nota Seksjaeva, 1989
- ナシチビガ — Bucculatrix pyrivorella Kuroko, 1964
- Bucculatrix serratella Kobayashi, Hirowatari & Kuroko, 2010
- Bucculatrix sinevi Seksjaeva, 1988
- Bucculatrix splendida Seksjaeva, 1992
- Bucculatrix thoracella (Thunberg, 1794)
- Bucculatrix tsurubamella Kobayashi, Hirowatari & Kuroko, 2010
- Bucculatrix univoca Meyrick, 1918

== Gracillariidae ==
- ハンノホシボシホソガ — Parornix alni Kumata, 1965
- カバホシボシホソガ — Parornix betulae (Stainton, 1854)
- 和名未定 — Parornix minor Kumata, 1965
- ホシボシホソガ — Parornix multimaculata (Matsumura, 1931)
- ベニホソガ — Macarostola japonica Kumata, 1977
- シロハマキホソガ — Gracillaria albicapitata Issiki, 1930
- 和名未定 — Gracillaria arsenievi (Ermolaev, 1977)
- イボタホソガ — Gracillaria japonica Kumata, 1982
- 和名未定 — Gracillaria ussuriella (Ermolaev, 1977)
- モミジハマキホソガ — Caloptilia acericola Kumata, 1966
- イタヤハマキホソガ — Caloptilia aceris Kumata, 1966
- ハンノハマキホソガ — Caloptilia alni Kumata, 1966
- ヤマモガシハマキホソガ — Caloptilia ariana (Meyrick, 1914)
- 和名未定 — Caloptilia aurifasciata Kumata, 1982
- ツツジハマキホソガ — Caloptilia azaleella (Brants, 1913)
- カンバハマキホソガ — Caloptilia betulicola (Hering, 1928)
- 和名未定 — Caloptilia bipunctata Kumata, 1982
- 和名未定 — Caloptilia callicarpae Kumata, 1982
- クスノハマキホソガ — Caloptilia camphorae Kumata, 1982
- タマホソガ — Caloptilia cecidophora Kumata, 1966
- エノキハマキホソガ — Caloptilia celtidis Kumata, 1982
- ヤナギコハマキホソガ — Caloptilia chrysolampra (Meyrick, 1938)
- 和名未定 — Caloptilia crinotibialis Kumata, 1982
- 和名未定 — Caloptilia cuculipennella (Hübner, [1796])
- フタモンハマキホソガ — Caloptilia geminata Kumata, 1966
- ムラサキハマキホソガ — Caloptilia gloriosa Kumata, 1966
- ヘリングハマキホソガ — Caloptilia heringi Kumata, 1966
- ヒダカハマキホソガ — Caloptilia hidakensis Kumata, 1966
- シキミハマキホソガ — Caloptilia illicii Kumata, 1966
- コガネハマキホソガ — Caloptilia isochrysa (Meyrick, 1908)
- ハンノナガホソガ — Caloptilia issikii Kumata, 1982
- カズラハマキホソガ — Caloptilia kadsurae Kumata, 1966
- 和名未定 — Caloptilia kisoensis Kumata, 1982
- クロコハマキホソガ — Caloptilia kurokoi Kumata, 1966
- ハナヒリノキハマキホソガ — Caloptilia leucothoes Kumata, 1982
- キバナイカリソウハマキホソガ — Caloptilia magnifica moriokensis Kumata, 1982
- コブシハマキホソガ — Caloptilia magnoliae Kumata, 1966
- ミズナラハマキホソガ — Caloptilia mandchurica (Christoph, 1882)
- マツムラハマキホソガ — Caloptilia matsumurai Kumata, 1982
- ミヤマハマキホソガ — Caloptilia monticola Kumata, 1966
- 和名未定 — Caloptilia protiella (Deventer, 1904)
- マダラハマキホソガ — Caloptilia pulverea Kumata, 1966
- 和名未定 — Caloptilia pyrrhaspis (Meyrick, 1931)
- ヌルデハマキホソガ — Caloptilia recitata (Meyrick, 1918)
- ホシヌルデハマキホソガ — Caloptilia rhois Kumata, 1982
- リュウキュウハマキホソガ — Caloptilia ryukyuensis Kumata, 1966
- シラキハマキホソガ — Caloptilia sapiivora Kumata, 1982
- クヌギハマキホソガ — Caloptilia sapporella (Matsumura, 1931)
- マツブサハマキホソガ — Caloptilia schisandrae Kumata, 1966
- イチモンジハマキホソガ — Caloptilia semifasciella Kumata, 1966
- マメハマキホソガ — Caloptilia soyella (Deventer, 1904)
- ヤナギハマキホソガ — Caloptilia stigmatella (Fabricius, 1781)
- 和名未定 — Caloptilia syrphetias (Meyrick, 1907)
- チャノハマキホソガ — Caloptilia theivora (Walsingham, 1893)
- ハルニレハマキホソガ — Caloptilia ulmi Kumata, 1982
- ワカヤマハマキホソガ — Caloptilia wakayamensis Kumata, 1966
- ヤスダハマキホソガ — Caloptilia yasudai Kumata, 1982
- リンゴハマキホソガ — Caloptilia zachrysa (Meyrick, 1937)
- ハスオビハマキホソガ — Povolnya obliquatella (Matsumura, 1931)
- ナラウススジハマキホソガ — Povolnya querci (Kumata, 1982)
- タデキボシホソガ — Calybites phasianipennella (Hübner, [1813])
- 和名未定 — Calybites trimaculata Kumata, 1982
- 和名未定 — Eucalybites aureola Kumata, 1982
- レイシホソガ — Conopomorpha litchiella Bradley, 1986
- レイシシロズホソガ — Conopomorpha sinensis Bradley, 1986
- ホソスジホソガ — Aristaea bathracma (Meyrick, 1912)
- ギンスジホソガ — Aristaea issikii Kumata, 1977
- シロスジホソガ — Aristaea pavoniella (Zeller, 1847)
- クチナシホソガ — Systoloneura geometropis (Meyrick, 1936)
- カンコマダラホソガ — Diphtheroptila scriptulata (Meyrick, 1916)
- ウラジロエノキマダラホソガ — Stomphastis labyrinthica (Meyrick, 1916)
- フジマダラホソガ — Liocrobyla brachybotrys Kuroko, 1960
- ヌスビトハギマダラホソガ — Liocrobyla desmodiella Kuroko, 1982
- ハギマダラホソガ — Liocrobyla kumatai Kuroko, 1982
- クズマダラホソガ — Liocrobyla lobata Kuroko, 1960
- カキアシブサホソガ — Cuphodes diospyrosella (Issiki, 1957)
- フジアシブサホソガ — Cuphodes wisteriella Kuroko, 1982
- 和名未定 — Callicercops iridocrossa (Meyrick, 1938)
- 和名未定 — Cryptolectica chrysalis Kumata & Ermolaev, 1988
- 和名未定 — Cryptolectica ensiformis (Yuan, 1986)
- マテバシイホソガ — Cryptolectica pasaniae Kumata & Kuroko, 1988
- ヌルデギンホソガ — Eteoryctis deversa (Meyrick, 1922)
- ニガキギンホソガ — Eteoryctis picrasmae Kumata & Kuroko, 1988
- フジホソガ — Psydrocercops wisteriae (Kuroko, 1982)
- 和名未定 — Acrocercops albofasciella Yazaki, 1926
- 和名未定 — Acrocercops distylii Kumata & Kuroko, 1988
- シイホソガ — Acrocercops mantica Meyrick, 1908
- シイクロテンホソガ — Acrocercops melanoplecta Meyrick, 1908
- 和名未定 — Acrocercops querci Kumata & Kuroko, 1988
- クルミホソガ — Acrocercops transecta Meyrick, 1931
- ウスズミホソガ — Acrocercops unistriata Yuan, 1986
- 和名未定 — Acrocercops vallata Kumata & Kuroko, 1988
- 和名未定 — Artifodina japonica Kumata, 1985
- 和名未定 — Dialectica geometra (Meyrick, 1916)
- 和名未定 — Dialectica japonica Kumata & Kuroko, 1988
- アカメガシワホソガ — Deoptilia heptadeta (Meyrick, 1936)
- ヤブニッケイホソガ — Gibbovalva civica (Meyrick, 1914)
- コブシホソガ — Gibbovalva kobusi Kumata & Kuroko, 1988
- ホウノキホソガ — Gibbovalva magnoliae Kumata & Kuroko, 1988
- クスオビホソガ — Gibbovalva quadrifasciata (Stainton, 1863)
- ガマホソガ — Gibbovalva tricuneatella (Meyrick, 1880)
- 和名未定 — Gibbovalva urbana (Meyrick, 1908)
- イチジクホソガ — Melanocercops ficuvorella (Yazaki, 1926)
- 和名未定 — Melanocercops phractopa (Meyrick, 1918)
- マメハモグリホソガ — Phodoryctis caerulea (Meyrick, 1920)
- 和名未定 — Phodoryctis stephaniae Kumata & Kuroko, 1988
- ヒサカキホソガ — Borboryctis euryae Kumata & Kuroko, 1988
- 和名未定 — Borboryctis triplaca (Meyrick, 1908)
- ヤマハハコホソガ — Leucospilapteryx anaphalidis Kumata, 1965
- ヨモギホソガ — Leucospilapteryx omissella (Stainton, 1848)
- 和名未定 — Chrysocercops castanopsidis Kumata & Kuroko, 1988
- カバオビホソガ — Telamoptilia cathedraea (Meyrick, 1908)
- イノコズチホソガ — Telamoptilia hemistacta (Meyrick, 1924)
- サツマイモホソガ — Telamoptilia prosacta (Meyrick, 1918)
- 和名未定 — Telamoptilia tiliae Kumata & Ermolaev, 1988
- ナシカワホソガ — Spulerina astaurota (Meyrick, 1922)
- クリカワホソガ — Spulerina castaneae Kumata & Kuroko, 1988
- マツノカワホソガ — Spulerina corticicola Kumata, 1964
- クズホソガ — Spulerina dissotoma (Meyrick, 1931)
- ツタホソガ — Spulerina parthenocissi Kumata & Kuroko, 1988
- クヌギカワホソガ — Spulerina virgulata Kumata & Kuroko, 1988
- ギンモンカワホソガ — Dendrorycter marmaroides Kumata, 1978
- 和名未定 — Ketapangia leucochorda (Meyrick, 1908)
- 和名未定 — Ketapangia regulifera (Meyrick, 1933)
- ギンモンツヤホソガ — Chrysaster hagicola Kumata, 1961
- ミツオビツヤホソガ — Neolithocolletis hikomonticola Kumata, 1963
- ヌスビトハギツヤホソガ — Hyloconis desmodii Kumata, 1963
- ハギツヤホソガ — Hyloconis lespedezae Kumata, 1963
- クズツヤホソガ — Hyloconis puerariae Kumata, 1963
- フジツヤホソガ — Hyloconis wisteriae Kumata, 1963
- イタヤニセキンホソガ — Cameraria acericola Kumata, 1963
- ガマズミニセキンホソガ — Cameraria hikosanensis Kumata, 1963
- モミジニセキンホソガ — Cameraria niphonica Kumata, 1963
- ニセクヌギキンモンホソガ — Phyllonorycter acutissimae (Kumata, 1963)
- アイヌキンモンホソガ — Phyllonorycter aino (Kumata, 1963)
- フタオビキンモンホソガ — Phyllonorycter bicinctella (Matsumura, 1931)
- エノキヒメキンモンホソガ — Phyllonorycter bifurcata (Kumata, 1967)
- 和名未定 — Phyllonorycter carpini (Kumata, 1963)
- カバノキンモンホソガ — Phyllonorycter cavella (Zeller, 1846)
- エノキキンモンホソガ — Phyllonorycter celtidis (Kumata, 1963)
- ナカオビキンモンホソガ — Phyllonorycter cretata (Kumata, 1957)
- ダケカンバキンホソガ — Phyllonorycter dakekanbae (Kumata, 1963)
- ミヤマキンモンホソガ — Phyllonorycter ermani (Kumata, 1963)
- ブナキンモンホソガ — Phyllonorycter fagifolia (Kumata, 1963)
- オオキンモンホソガ — Phyllonorycter gigas (Kumata, 1963)
- カラコギカエデキンモンホソガ — Phyllonorycter ginnalae (Ermolaev, 1981)
- ハンノキンモンホソガ — Phyllonorycter hancola (Kumata, 1958)
- ヒコサンキンモンホソガ — Phyllonorycter hikosana (Kumata, 1963)
- ホソスジキンモンホソガ — Phyllonorycter issikii (Kumata, 1963)
- ヤマトキンモンホソガ — Phyllonorycter japonica (Kumata, 1963)
- エゾキンモンホソガ — Phyllonorycter jezoniella (Matsumura, 1931)
- サンザシキンモンホソガ — Phyllonorycter jozanae (Kumata, 1967)
- クルミキンモンホソガ — Phyllonorycter juglandis (Kumata, 1963)
- コケモモキンモンホソガ — Phyllonorycter junoniella (Zeller, 1846)
- カミジョウキンモンホソガ — Phyllonorycter kamijoi (Kumata, 1963)
- キソキンモンホソガ — Phyllonorycter kisoensis Kumata & Park, 1978
- クロコキンモンホソガ — Phyllonorycter kurokoi (Kumata, 1963)
- オヒョウキンモンホソガ — Phyllonorycter laciniatae (Kumata, 1967)
- キンスジシロホソガ — Phyllonorycter leucocorona (Kumata, 1957)
- ツヤオビキンモンホソガ — Phyllonorycter longispinata (Kumata, 1958)
- スイカズラキンモンホソガ — Phyllonorycter lonicerae (Kumata, 1963)
- ネジキキンモンホソガ — Phyllonorycter lyoniae (Kumata, 1963)
- ナカモンキンホソガ — Phyllonorycter maculata (Kumata, 1963)
- マツダキンモンホソガ — Phyllonorycter matsudai Kumata, 1986
- ズグロキンモンホソガ — Phyllonorycter melacoronis (Kumata, 1963)
- ミズナラキンモンホソガ — Phyllonorycter mongolicae (Kumata, 1963)
- ネジロキンモンホソガ — Phyllonorycter nigristella (Kumata, 1957)
- クヌギキンモンホソガ — Phyllonorycter nipponicella (Issiki, 1930)
- カエデキンモンホソガ — Phyllonorycter orientalis (Kumata, 1963)
- アサダキンモンホソガ — Phyllonorycter ostryae (Kumata, 1963)
- マダラキンモンホソガ — Phyllonorycter pastorella (Zeller, 1846)
- カシワミスジキンモンホソガ — Phyllonorycter persimilis Fujihara, Sato & Kumata, 2000
- ナラキンモンホソガ — Phyllonorycter pseudolautella (Kumata, 1963)
- サワグルミキンモンホソガ — Phyllonorycter pterocaryae (Kumata, 1963)
- ナカグロキンモンホソガ — Phyllonorycter pulchra (Kumata, 1963)
- ヒメキンモンホソガ — Phyllonorycter pygmaea (Kumata, 1963)
- キンモンホソガ — Phyllonorycter ringoniella (Matsumura, 1931)
- ハスオビキンモンホソガ — Phyllonorycter rostrispinosa (Kumata, 1963)
- ヤナギキンモンホソガ — Phyllonorycter salicicolella (Sircom, 1848)
- ハスオビヤナギキンモンホソガ — Phyllonorycter salictella (Zeller, 1846)
- ミスジキンモンホソガ — Phyllonorycter similis Kumata, 1982
- ナナカマドキンモンホソガ — Phyllonorycter sorbicola (Kumata, 1963)
- フトオビキンモンホソガ — Phyllonorycter spinolella (Duponchel, 1838)
- コゴメウツギキンモンホソガ — Phyllonorycter stephanandrae (Kumata, 1967)
- ヤマハンノキキンモンホソガ — Phyllonorycter strigulatella (Zeller, 1846)
- エゴノキンモンホソガ — Phyllonorycter styracis (Kumata, 1963)
- タカギキンモンホソガ — Phyllonorycter takagii (Kumata, 1963)
- ハシバミキンモンホソガ — Phyllonorycter tenebriosa (Kumata, 1967)
- ミツオビキンモンホソガ — Phyllonorycter tritorrhecta (Meyrick, 1935)
- ツルギキンモンホソガ — Phyllonorycter turugisana (Kumata, 1963)
- ウチダキンモンホソガ — Phyllonorycter uchidai (Kumata, 1963)
- ニレキンモンホソガ — Phyllonorycter ulmi (Kumata, 1963)
- ツマスジキンモンホソガ — Phyllonorycter ulmiforiella (Hübner, [1817])
- ガマズミキンモンホソガ — Phyllonorycter viburni (Kumata, 1963)
- クサフジキンモンホソガ — Phyllonorycter viciae (Kumata, 1963)
- ワタナベキンモンホソガ — Phyllonorycter watanabei (Kumata, 1963)
- ヤクシマキンモンホソガ — Phyllonorycter yakusimensis (Kumata, 1967)
- ケヤキキンモンホソガ — Phyllonorycter zelkovae (Kumata, 1963)
- チビキンモンホソガ — Porphyrosela alternata Kumata, 1993
- 和名未定 — Porphyrosela dorinda (Meyrick, 1912)
- Eumetriochroa araliella Kobayashi, Huang & Hirowatari, 2013
- キヅタオビギンホソガ — Eumetriochroa hederae Kumata, 1998
- 和名未定 — Eumetriochroa hiranoi Kumata, 1998
- 和名未定 — Eumetriochroa kalopanacis Kumata, 1998
- イヌツゲオビギンホソガ — Eumetriochroa miyatai Kumata, 1998
- ネズミモチクロホソガ — Metriochroa fraxinella Kumata, 1998
- 和名未定 — Metriochroa syringae Kumata, 1998
- 和名未定 — Corythoxestis sunosei (Kumata, 1998)
- Corythoxestis tricalysiella Kobayashi, Huang & Hirowatari, 2013
- 和名未定 — Corythoxestis yaeyamensis (Kumata, 1998)
- Guttigera schefflerella Kobayashi, Huang & Hirowatari, 2013
- ミカンコハモグリ — Phyllocnistis citrella Stainton, 1856
- 和名未定 — Phyllocnistis cornella Ermolaev, 1987
- ユズリハコハモグリ — Phyllocnistis hyperbolacma (Meyrick, 1931)
- ヤナギコハモグリ — Phyllocnistis saligna (Zeller, 1839)
- センダンコハモグリ — Phyllocnistis selenopa Meyrick, 1915
- ブドウコハモグリ — Phyllocnistis toparcha Meyrick, 1918
- 和名未定 — Phyllocnistis unipunctella (Stephens, 1834)

== Yponomeutidae ==
- アセビツバメスガ — Saridoscelis kodamai Moriuti, 1961
- シャシャンボツバメスガ — Saridoscelis sphenias Meyrick, 1894
- シロツバメスガ — Saridoscelis synodias Meyrick, 1932
- マルギンバネスガ — Thecobathra anas (Stringer, 1930)
- トガリギンバネスガ — Thecobathra eta (Moriuti, 1963)
- ツヤギンバネスガ — Niphonympha vera Moriuti, 1963
- オオボシハイスガ — Yponomeuta anatolicus Stringer, 1930
- モトキスガ — Yponomeuta bipunctellus Matsumura, 1931
- ツリバナスガ — Yponomeuta eurinellus Zagulajev, 1969
- ヒメボシハイスガ — Yponomeuta griseatus Moriuti, 1977
- ニシキギスガ — Yponomeuta kanaiellus Matsumura, 1931
- 和名未定 — Yponomeuta kostjuki Gershenson, 1985
- ツルマサキスガ — Yponomeuta mayumivorellus Matsumura, 1931
- マサキスガ — Yponomeuta meguronis Matsumura, 1931
- 和名未定 — Yponomeuta menkeni Gershenson & Ulenberg, 1998
- ヤマハイスガ — Yponomeuta montanatus Moriuti, 1977
- リンゴスガ — Yponomeuta orientalis Zagulajev, 1969
- マユミハイスガ — Yponomeuta osakae Moriuti, 1977
- オオボシオオスガ — Yponomeuta polystictus Butler, 1879
- コマユミシロスガ — Yponomeuta polystigmellus Felder & Felder, 1862
- サクラスガ — Yponomeuta refrigerata Meyrick, 1931
- ベンケイソウスガ — Yponomeuta sedella (Treitschke, 1833)
- ツルウメモドキスガ — Yponomeuta sociatus Moriuti, 1972
- マユミシロスガ — Yponomeuta spodocrossus Meyrick, 1935
- マユミオオスガ — Yponomeuta tokyonellus Matsumura, 1931
- ツマグロハイスガ — Yponomeuta yanagawanus Matsumura, 1931
- ヒメニセハイスガ — Eumonopyta unicornis Moriuti, 1977
- ムモンニセハイスガ — Euhyponomeuta secundus Moriuti, 1977
- ホシニセハイスガ — Teinoptila guttella Moriuti, 1977
- ハイズソバカススガ — Kessleria insulella Moriuti, 1977
- シロズキヌスガ — Kessleria pseudosericella Moriuti, 1977
- ヒメホソスガ — Euhyponomeutoides namikoae Moriuti, 1977
- ホソスガ — Euhyponomeutoides trachydeltus (Meyrick, 1931)
- イボタコスガ — Zelleria hepariella Stainton, 1849
- ニセイボタコスガ — Zelleria japonicella Moriuti, 1977
- ハシドイコスガ — Zelleria silvicolella Moriuti, 1977
- ホソバコスガ — Xyrosaris lichneuta Meyrick, 1918
- アトジロコスガ — Lycophantis bradleyi Moriuti, 1963
- オオシロジスガ — Klausius major Moriuti, 1977
- ヒメシロジスガ — Klausius minor Moriuti, 1977
- キエリヒメスガ — Lampresthia lucella Moriuti, 1977
- アトスカシモンヒメスガ — Metanomeuta fulvicrinis Meyrick, 1935
- ニセウスグロヒメスガ — Swammerdamia caesiella (Hübner, [1796])
- ウスグロヒメスガ — Swammerdamia pyrella (Villers, 1789)
- マンネングサヒメスガ — Swammerdamia sedella Moriuti, 1977
- ミヤマヒメスガ — Paraswammerdamia monticolella Moriuti, 1977
- ウスキヒメスガ — Cedestis exiguata Moriuti, 1977
- アカマツハモグリスガ — Ocnerostoma friesei Svensson, 1966
- クルミニセスガ — Prays alpha Moriuti, 1977
- トネリコニセスガ — Prays beta Moriuti, 1977
- ミヤマイボタニセスガ — Prays delta Moriuti, 1977
- ハイイロニセスガ — Prays epsilon Moriuti, 1977
- ツヤズニセスガ — Prays gamma Moriuti, 1977
- ミヤマガマズミニセスガ — Prays iota Moriuti, 1977
- ムモンニセスガ — Prays kappa Moriuti, 1977
- サンゴジュニセスガ — Prays lambda Moriuti, 1977
- ガマズミニセスガ — Prays omicron Moriuti, 1977
- シロズメムシガ — Argyresthia albicomella Moriuti, 1969
- ナナカマドメムシガ — Argyresthia alpha Friese & Moriuti, 1968
- カタキンメムシガ — Argyresthia angusta Moriuti, 1969
- スギメムシガ — Argyresthia anthocephala Meyrick, 1936
- セジロメムシガ — Argyresthia assimilis Moriuti, 1977
- モチツツジメムシガ — Argyresthia beta Friese & Moriuti, 1968
- シロモンキンメムシガ — Argyresthia brockeella (Hübner, [1813])
- ヒノキハモグリガ — Argyresthia chamaecypariae Moriuti, 1965
- クロモンメムシガ — Argyresthia communana Moriuti, 1969
- リンゴヒメシンクイ — Argyresthia conjugella Zeller, 1839
- カオキメムシガ — Argyresthia festiva Moriuti, 1969
- シンチュウムモンメムシガ — Argyresthia flavicomans Moriuti, 1969
- ハイイロムモンメムシガ — Argyresthia fujiyamae Moriuti, 1969
- ズミメムシガ — Argyresthia ivella (Haworth, 1828)
- カラマツエダモグリガ — Argyresthia laevigatella Herrich-Schäffer, 1855
- アトモンメムシガ — Argyresthia magna Moriuti, 1969
- オオムジメムシガ — Argyresthia metallicolor Moriuti, 1969
- トドマツメムシガ — Argyresthia nemorivaga Moriuti, 1969
- シロオビキンメムシガ — Argyresthia perbella Moriuti, 1969
- ネズミサシミモグリガ — Argyresthia praecocella Zeller, 1839
- アトジロメムシガ — Argyresthia rara Moriuti, 1969
- アミメシロメムシガ — Argyresthia retinella Zeller, 1839
- ビャクシンハモグリガ — Argyresthia sabinae Moriuti, 1965
- オオキメムシガ — Argyresthia subrimosa Meyrick, 1932
- ツツジメムシガ — Argyresthia tutuzicolella Moriuti, 1969
- ニホンニセメムシガ — Paraargyresthia japonica Moriuti, 1969

== Ypsolophidae ==
- スイカズラクチブサガ — Bhadorcosma lonicerae Moriuti, 1977
- ホソトガリクチブサガ — Ypsolopha acuminatus (Butler, 1878)
- ギンスジクチブサガ — Ypsolopha albistriatus (Issiki, 1930)
- メノコクチブサガ — Ypsolopha amoenellus (Christoph, 1882)
- キンツヤクチブサガ — Ypsolopha auratus Moriuti, 1977
- オオキクチブサガ — Ypsolopha blandellus (Christoph, 1882)
- ノコヒゲクチブサガ — Ypsolopha cristatus Moriuti, 1977
- ミダレモンクチブサガ — Ypsolopha distinctatus Moriuti, 1977
- キイロクチブサガ — Ypsolopha flavus (Issiki, 1930)
- サビイロクチブサガ — Ypsolopha fujimotoi Moriuti, 1964
- オオアトベリクチブサガ — Ypsolopha japonicus Moriuti, 1964
- シロムネクチブサガ — Ypsolopha leuconotellus (Snellen, 1884)
- マユミオオクチブサガ — Ypsolopha longus Moriuti, 1964
- コナラクチブサガ — Ypsolopha parallelus (Caradja, 1939)
- ウスイロクチブサガ — Ypsolopha parenthesellus (Linnaeus, 1761)
- マエシロクチブサガ — Ypsolopha saitoi Moriuti, 1964
- 和名未定 — Ypsolopha sasayamanus (Matsumura, 1931)
- シロスジクチブサガ — Ypsolopha strigosus (Butler, 1879)
- コメツガクチブサガ — Ypsolopha tsugae Moriuti, 1977
- アトベリクチブサガ — Ypsolopha vittellus (Linnaeus, 1758)
- クロテンキクチブサガ — Ypsolopha yasudai Moriuti, 1964
- ムラサキクチブサガ — Rhabdocosma aglaophanes Meyrick, 1935

== Plutellidae ==
- ダイセツナガ — Plutella porrectella (Linnaeus, 1758)
- コナガ — Plutella xylostella (Linnaeus, 1758)
- ヒロバコナガ — Leuroperna sera (Meyrick, 1889)
- アトモンナガ — Rhigognostis japonica (Moriuti, 1977)
- ナガバナガ — Rhigognostis senilella (Zetterstedt, 1840)
- シロオビクロナガ — Eidophasia albifasciata Issiki, 1930

== Acrolepiidae ==
- ヨモギハモグリコガ — Digitivalva artemisiella Moriuti, 1972
- チビカザリコガ — Digitivalva hemiglypha Diakonoff & Arita, 1976
- 和名未定 — Digitivalva sibirica Toll, 1958
- アトシロモンコガ — Digitivalvopsis paradoxa (Moriuti, 1982)
- キマダラコガ — Acrolepiopsis clavivalvatella Moriuti, 1972
- ミズギボウシアトモンコガ — Acrolepiopsis delta (Moriuti, 1961)
- トコロミコガ — Acrolepiopsis issikiella (Moriuti, 1961)
- ヤマノイモムカゴコガ — Acrolepiopsis japonica Gaedike, 1982
- ナガイモコガ — Acrolepiopsis nagaimo Yasuda, 2000
- ウチョウランハモグリコガ — Acrolepiopsis orchidophaga Moriuti, 1982
- イノコズチコガ — Acrolepiopsis persimilis Moriuti, 1974
- 和名未定 — Acrolepiopsis peterseni Gaedike
- ギボウシアトモンコガ — Acrolepiopsis postomacula (Matsumura, 1931)
- ネギコガ — Acrolepiopsis sapporensis (Matsumura, 1931)
- ヤマノイモコガ — Acrolepiopsis suzukiella (Matsumura, 1931)

== Glyphipterigidae ==
- コホソハマキモドキ — Glyphipterix alpha Moriuti & Saito, 1964
- シロオビホソハマキモドキ — Glyphipterix basifasciata Issiki, 1930
- オオホソハマキモドキ — Glyphipterix beta Moriuti & Saito, 1964
- シロモンホソハマキモドキ — Glyphipterix delta Moriuti & Saito, 1964
- 和名未定 — Glyphipterix ditiorana (Walker, 1863)
- アトフタモンホソハマキモドキ — Glyphipterix euleucotoma Diakonoff & Arita, 1976
- シロズホソハマキモドキ — Glyphipterix forsterella nivicaput Arita, 1987
- ヒメシロスジホソハマキモドキ — Glyphipterix funditrix Diakonoff & Arita, 1976
- カラカネホソハマキモドキ — Glyphipterix gamma Moriuti & Saito, 1964
- キスジホソハマキモドキ — Glyphipterix gaudialis Diakonoff & Arita, 1976
- ヒメキスジホソハマキモドキ — Glyphipterix gemmula Diakonoff & Arita, 1976
- メスモンホソハマキモドキ — Glyphipterix imparfasciata Arita, 1979
- キモンホソハマキモドキ — Glyphipterix japonicella Zeller, 1877
- キオビホソハマキモドキ — Glyphipterix luteomaculata Arita, 1979
- メラニアホソハマキモドキ — Glyphipterix melania Diakonoff & Arita, 1976
- トウキョウホソハマキモドキ — Glyphipterix mikadonis Arita & Owada, 2006
- ヘリグロホソハマキモドキ — Glyphipterix nigromarginata Issiki, 1930
- ホソモンホソハマキモドキ — Glyphipterix okui Diakonoff & Arita, 1976
- アトミスジホソハマキモドキ — Glyphipterix regula Diakonoff & Arita, 1976
- 和名未定 — Glyphipterix scleriae Arita, 1987
- ナミホソハマキモドキ — Glyphipterix semiflavana Issiki, 1930
- ヒロモンホソハマキモドキ — Glyphipterix trigonodes Arita, 1979
- ツマキホソハマキモドキ — Lepidotarphius perornatellus (Walker, 1864)
- ツヤホソハマキモドキ — Carmentina molybdotoma (Diakonoff & Arita, 1979)

== Heliodinidae ==
- クロマイコガ — Corsocasis coronias Meyrick, 1912
- ハリギリマイコガ — Epicroesa chromatorhoea Diakonoff & Arita, 1979

== Bedelliidae ==
- ノアサガオハモグリガ — Bedellia ipomoella Kuroko, 1982
- ヒルガオハモグリガ — Bedellia somnulentella (Zeller, 1847)

== Lyonetiidae ==
- シャリンバイハモグリガ — Lyonetia anthemopa Meyrick, 1936
- バクチノキハモグリガ — Lyonetia bakuchia Kuroko, 1964
- カラムシハモグリガ — Lyonetia boehmeriella Kuroko, 1964
- クリハモグリガ — Lyonetia castaneella Kuroko, 1964
- モモハモグリガ — Lyonetia clerkella (Linnaeus, 1758)
- ヒサカキハモグリガ — Lyonetia euryella Kuroko, 1964
- ツツジハモグリガ — Lyonetia ledi Wocke, 1859
- ハマヒサカキハモグリガ — Lyonetia meridiana Kuroko, 1982
- ヤマモモハモグリガ — Lyonetia myricella Kuroko, 1964
- リンゴハモグリガ — Lyonetia prunifoliella malinella (Matsumura, 1910)
- ヤスダハモグリガ — Lyonetia yasudai Kuroko, 1964
- ダイズギンモンハモグリ — Microthauma glycinella Kuroko, 1964
- ヤマハギシロハモグリ — Microthauma lespedezella Seksjaeva, 1990
- ツルウメモドキシロハモグリ — Proleucoptera celastrella Kuroko, 1964
- ツリバナシロハモグリ — Proleucoptera oxyphyllella Kuroko, 1964
- サルトリイバラシロハモグリ — Proleucoptera smilactis Kuroko, 1964
- ポプラシロハモグリ — Paraleucoptera sinuella (Reutti, 1853)
- カラコギカエデシロハモグリ — Leucoptera ermolaevi Seksjaeva, 1990
- クズシロハモグリ — Leucoptera puerariella Kuroko, 1964
