= Phyllonorycter japonica =

Scientific classification
- Kingdom: Animalia
- Phylum: Arthropoda
- Class: Insecta
- Order: Lepidoptera
- Family: Gracillariidae
- Genus: Phyllonorycter
- Species: P. japonica

Binomial name
- Phyllonorycter japonica (Kumata, 1963)

Synonyms
- Lithocolletis japonica Kumata, 1963

Species of moth

Phyllonorycter japonica is a moth of the family Gracillariidae. It is known from Japan (the islands of Hokkaidō, Honshū, Kyūshū and Shikoku) and the Russian Far East.

The wingspan is 6–8 mm.

The larvae feed on Carpinus laxiflora, Carpinus tschonoskii, Corylus heterophylla, Corylus mandshurica and Ostrya japonica. They mine the leaves of their host plant.
