= Stigmella spiculifera =

Scientific classification
- Kingdom: Animalia
- Phylum: Arthropoda
- Clade: Pancrustacea
- Class: Insecta
- Order: Lepidoptera
- Family: Nepticulidae
- Genus: Stigmella
- Species: S. spiculifera

Binomial name
- Stigmella spiculifera Kemperman & Wilkinson, 1985

Species of moth

Stigmella spiculifera is a moth of the family Nepticulidae. It is only known from Kyushu in Japan.

The larvae feed on Rubus hirsutus and Rubus palmatus. They mine the leaves of their host plant.
