= Kurokopteryx =

Scientific classification
- Kingdom: Animalia
- Phylum: Arthropoda
- Class: Insecta
- Order: Lepidoptera
- Family: Micropterigidae
- Genus: Kurokopteryx; Hashimoto, 2006

Species
- see text.

Genus of moths in family Micropterigidae

Kurokopteryx is a genus of small primitive metallic moths in the family Micropterigidae. It was described in 2006 by Hashimoto and is specific to Japan, in the Honshu, Shikoku, and Kyushu prefectures. Its forewing length is 4.2 to 4.9 millimetres (0.17 to 0.19 in) on males and 4.1 to 4.8 millimetres (0.16 to 0.19 in) on females.

== Species ==
- Kurokopteryx dolichocerata (Hashimoto, 2006)
