= Phyllonorycter ostryae =

Scientific classification
- Kingdom: Animalia
- Phylum: Arthropoda
- Class: Insecta
- Order: Lepidoptera
- Family: Gracillariidae
- Genus: Phyllonorycter
- Species: P. ostryae

Binomial name
- Phyllonorycter ostryae (Kumata, 1963)

Synonyms
- Lithocolletis ostryae Kumata, 1963

Species of moth

Phyllonorycter ostryae is a moth of the family Gracillariidae. It is known from Hokkaidō island of Japan.

The wingspan is 5.5-6.5 mm.

The larvae feed on Ostrya japonica. They mine the leaves of their host plant.
