= Phyllonorycter pulchra =

Scientific classification
- Kingdom: Animalia
- Phylum: Arthropoda
- Class: Insecta
- Order: Lepidoptera
- Family: Gracillariidae
- Genus: Phyllonorycter
- Species: P. pulchra

Binomial name
- Phyllonorycter pulchra (Kumata, 1963)

Synonyms
- Lithocolletis pulchra Kumata, 1963

Species of moth

Phyllonorycter pulchra is a moth of the family Gracillariidae. It is known from the islands of Kyushu and Honshu in Japan and from Taiwan.

The wingspan is 6.5–7.5 mm.

The larvae feed as leaf miners on Rubus illecebrosus and Rubus palmatus var. coptophyllus. The larva mines into the inter-parenchyma of the leaves.
