= Stigmella clisiotophora =

Scientific classification
- Kingdom: Animalia
- Phylum: Arthropoda
- Clade: Pancrustacea
- Class: Insecta
- Order: Lepidoptera
- Family: Nepticulidae
- Genus: Stigmella
- Species: S. clisiotophora

Binomial name
- Stigmella clisiotophora Kemperman & Wilkinson, 1985

Species of moth

Stigmella clisiotophora is a moth of the family Nepticulidae. It is only known from the small island of Tsushima in Japan, but is probably also present in China.

Living larvae were collected in mid-October and adults emerged in June of the next year. There are at least two generations per year in southern Japan.

The larvae feed on Quercus variabilis. They mine the leaves of their host plant. The mine is similar to that of Stigmella fumida on the same host.
