= Ketapangia =

Scientific classification
- Kingdom: Animalia
- Phylum: Arthropoda
- Class: Insecta
- Order: Lepidoptera
- Family: Gracillariidae
- Subfamily: Gracillariinae
- Genus: Ketapangia; Kumata, 1995

Species
- See text

Genus of moths

Ketapangia is a genus of moths in the family Gracillariidae.

== Species ==
- Ketapangia leucochorda (Meyrick, 1908)
- Ketapangia regulifera (Meyrick, 1933)
