= Phyllonorycter turugisana =

Scientific classification
- Kingdom: Animalia
- Phylum: Arthropoda
- Class: Insecta
- Order: Lepidoptera
- Family: Gracillariidae
- Genus: Phyllonorycter
- Species: P. turugisana

Binomial name
- Phyllonorycter turugisana (Kumata, 1963)

Synonyms
- Lithocolletis turugisana Kumata, 1963

Species of moth

Phyllonorycter turugisana is a moth of the family Gracillariidae. It is known from the islands of Shikoku, Kyushu and Hokkaido in Japan.

The wingspan is about 7 mm.

The larvae feed on Carpinus cordata, Carpinus laxiflora and Ostrya japonica. They probably mine the leaves of their host plant.
