= Stigmella alikurokoi =

Scientific classification
- Kingdom: Animalia
- Phylum: Arthropoda
- Clade: Pancrustacea
- Class: Insecta
- Order: Lepidoptera
- Family: Nepticulidae
- Genus: Stigmella
- Species: S. alikurokoi

Binomial name
- Stigmella alikurokoi Kemperman & Wilkinson, 1985

Species of moth

Stigmella alikurokoi is a moth of the family Nepticulidae. It is only known from Kyushu in Japan.

There are three generations or more per year.

The larvae feed on Rubus buergeri, Rubus phoenicolasius and Rubus palmatus var. coptophyllus. They mine the leaves of their host plant.
