= Ketapangia regulifera =

Scientific classification
- Kingdom: Animalia
- Phylum: Arthropoda
- Class: Insecta
- Order: Lepidoptera
- Family: Gracillariidae
- Genus: Ketapangia
- Species: K. regulifera

Binomial name
- Ketapangia regulifera (Meyrick, 1933)

Synonyms
- Acrocercops regulifera Meyrick, 1933

Species of moth

Ketapangia regulifera is a moth of the family Gracillariidae. It is known from Japan (Ryukyu Islands), Malaysia (Sarawak, West Malaysia, Kedah and Pahang), the Philippines (Luzon) and Taiwan.

The wingspan is 6.8–8.4 mm.

The larvae feed on Terminalia catappa. They mine the leaves of their host plant.
