= Phyllonorycter sorbicola =

Scientific classification
- Kingdom: Animalia
- Phylum: Arthropoda
- Class: Insecta
- Order: Lepidoptera
- Family: Gracillariidae
- Genus: Phyllonorycter
- Species: P. sorbicola

Binomial name
- Phyllonorycter sorbicola (Kumata, 1963)

Synonyms
- Lithocolletis sorbicola Kumata, 1963

Species of moth

Phyllonorycter sorbicola is a moth of the family Gracillariidae. It is known from Japan (the islands of Hokkaido and Shikoku) and the Russian Far East.

The wingspan is 6–7 mm.

The larvae feed as leaf miners on Sorbus matsumurana, Sorbus commixta, Sorbus alnifolia, Prunus avium, Malus pumila and Malus asiatica.
