= Phyllonorycter similis =

Scientific classification
- Kingdom: Animalia
- Phylum: Arthropoda
- Class: Insecta
- Order: Lepidoptera
- Family: Gracillariidae
- Genus: Phyllonorycter
- Species: P. similis

Binomial name
- Phyllonorycter similis Kumata, 1982

Species of moth

Phyllonorycter similis is a moth of the family Gracillariidae. It is known from Japan (the islands of Hokkaidō, Honshū, Kyūshū, Satunan and Shikoku), Korea and the Russian Far East.
