= Caloptilia acericola =

Scientific classification
- Kingdom: Animalia
- Phylum: Arthropoda
- Class: Insecta
- Order: Lepidoptera
- Family: Gracillariidae
- Genus: Caloptilia
- Species: C. acericola

Binomial name
- Caloptilia acericola Kumata, 1966

Species of moth

Caloptilia acericola is a moth of the family Gracillariidae. It is known from Japan (Hokkaidō, Honshū, Kyūshū) and the Russian Far East.

The wingspan is 9–11 mm.

The larvae feed on Acer japonicum, Acer mono, Acer palmatum and Acer pseudosieboldianum. They probably mine the leaves of their host plant.
