= Phyllonorycter dakekanbae =

Scientific classification
- Kingdom: Animalia
- Phylum: Arthropoda
- Class: Insecta
- Order: Lepidoptera
- Family: Gracillariidae
- Genus: Phyllonorycter
- Species: P. dakekanbae

Binomial name
- Phyllonorycter dakekanbae (Kumata, 1963)

Synonyms
- Lithocolletis dakekanbae Kumata, 1963

Species of moth

Phyllonorycter dakekanbae is a moth of the family Gracillariidae. It is known from Hokkaidō island in Japan and the Russian Far East.

The wingspan is about 7.5 mm.

The larvae feed on Betula ermanii and Betula platyphylla var. japonica. They mine the leaves of their host plant.
