= Phyllonorycter uchidai =

Scientific classification
- Kingdom: Animalia
- Phylum: Arthropoda
- Class: Insecta
- Order: Lepidoptera
- Family: Gracillariidae
- Genus: Phyllonorycter
- Species: P. uchidai

Binomial name
- Phyllonorycter uchidai (Kumata, 1963)

Synonyms
- Lithocolletis uchidai Kumata, 1963; Phyllonorycter uchidae Kuznetzov, 1999

Species of moth

Phyllonorycter uchidai is a moth of the family Gracillariidae. It is known from Hokkaido island of Japan.

The wingspan is 6–7 mm.

The larvae feed as leaf miners on Sorbus alnifolia. The mine is ptychonomous and located on the upper surface of the leaf.
