= Phyllonorycter nigristella =

Scientific classification
- Kingdom: Animalia
- Phylum: Arthropoda
- Class: Insecta
- Order: Lepidoptera
- Family: Gracillariidae
- Genus: Phyllonorycter
- Species: P. nigristella

Binomial name
- Phyllonorycter nigristella (Kumata, 1957)

Synonyms
- Lithocolletis nigristella Kumata, 1957

Species of moth

Phyllonorycter nigristella is a moth of the family Gracillariidae. It is found on the islands of Hokkaidō, Honshū and Shikoku in Japan and in the Russian Far East.

The larvae feed on Quercus dentata, Quercus mongolica and Quercus serrata. They mine the leaves of their host plant.
