= Phyllonorycter lyoniae =

Scientific classification
- Kingdom: Animalia
- Phylum: Arthropoda
- Clade: Pancrustacea
- Class: Insecta
- Order: Lepidoptera
- Family: Gracillariidae
- Genus: Phyllonorycter
- Species: P. lyoniae

Binomial name
- Phyllonorycter lyoniae (Kumata, 1963)

Synonyms
- Lithocolletis lyoniae Kumata, 1963

Species of moth

Phyllonorycter lyoniae is a moth of the family Gracillariidae, described by Tosio Kumata in 1963. It is known from the islands of Shikoku, Kyushu and Honshu in Japan. Its wingspan is 6.5–7 mm.
