= Acrocercops unistriata =

Scientific classification
- Domain: Eukaryota
- Kingdom: Animalia
- Phylum: Arthropoda
- Class: Insecta
- Order: Lepidoptera
- Family: Gracillariidae
- Genus: Acrocercops
- Species: A. unistriata

Binomial name
- Acrocercops unistriata Yuan, 1986

Species of moth

Acrocercops unistriata is a moth of the family Gracillariidae. It is known from China (Guangdong, Zhejiang), Hong Kong, Japan (Tusima, Honshū, the Ryukyu Islands, Shikoku), Nepal and Taiwan.

The wingspan is 6.5–9.4 mm.

The larvae feed on Castanopsis indica, Castanopsis lanata, Lithocarpus glaber, Quercus acuta, Quercus acutissima, Quercus glauca, Quercus pachyloma, Quercus phillyraeoides, Quercus serrata and Quercus sessilifolia. They mine the leaves of their host plant.
