= Phyllonorycter kisoensis =

Scientific classification
- Kingdom: Animalia
- Phylum: Arthropoda
- Class: Insecta
- Order: Lepidoptera
- Family: Gracillariidae
- Genus: Phyllonorycter
- Species: P. kisoensis

Binomial name
- Phyllonorycter kisoensis Kumata & Park, 1978

Species of moth

Phyllonorycter kisoensis is a moth of the family Gracillariidae. It is known from the main island of Honshū in Japan and from the Russian Far East.

The wingspan is 6.2–8 mm.

The larvae feed on Alnus hirsuta. They mine the leaves of their host plant.
