= Stigmella kurotsubarai =

Scientific classification
- Kingdom: Animalia
- Phylum: Arthropoda
- Clade: Pancrustacea
- Class: Insecta
- Order: Lepidoptera
- Family: Nepticulidae
- Genus: Stigmella
- Species: S. kurotsubarai

Binomial name
- Stigmella kurotsubarai Kemperman & Wilkinson, 1985

Species of moth

Stigmella kurotsubarai is a moth of the family Nepticulidae. It is only known to exist on Honshu, the largest island in Japan.

The larvae feed on Rhamnus davurica var. nipponica. They mine the leaves of their host plant.
