= Phyllonorycter carpini =

Scientific classification
- Kingdom: Animalia
- Phylum: Arthropoda
- Class: Insecta
- Order: Lepidoptera
- Family: Gracillariidae
- Genus: Phyllonorycter
- Species: P. carpini

Binomial name
- Phyllonorycter carpini (Kumata, 1963)

Synonyms
- Lithocolletis carpini Kumata, 1963

Species of moth

Phyllonorycter carpini is a moth of the family Gracillariidae. It is known from Japan (Hokkaidō) and the Russian Far East.

The wingspan is 5.5–6.5 mm.
