= Phyllonorycter ulmi =

Scientific classification
- Kingdom: Animalia
- Phylum: Arthropoda
- Class: Insecta
- Order: Lepidoptera
- Family: Gracillariidae
- Genus: Phyllonorycter
- Species: P. ulmi

Binomial name
- Phyllonorycter ulmi (Kumata, 1963)

Synonyms
- Lithocolletis ulmi Kumata, 1963

Species of moth

Phyllonorycter ulmi is a moth of the family Gracillariidae. It is known from Japan (Hokkaido island), Korea and the Russian Far East.

The wingspan is 5–6 mm.

The larvae feed as leaf miners on Ulmus davidiana var. japonica, Ulmus japonica, Zelkova serrata and Ulmus laciniata. The mine is ptychonomous and created on the upper surface of the leaves.
