= Phyllonorycter stephanandrae =

Scientific classification
- Kingdom: Animalia
- Phylum: Arthropoda
- Class: Insecta
- Order: Lepidoptera
- Family: Gracillariidae
- Genus: Phyllonorycter
- Species: P. stephanandrae

Binomial name
- Phyllonorycter stephanandrae (Kumata, 1967)

Synonyms
- Lithocolletis stephanandrae Kumata, 1967

Species of moth

Phyllonorycter stephanandrae is a moth of the family Gracillariidae. It is known from the island of Honshū in Japan.

The wingspan is 6–7 mm.

The larvae feed on Stephanandra incisa. They mine the leaves of their host plant.
