= Glyphipterix basifasciata =

Scientific classification
- Kingdom: Animalia
- Phylum: Arthropoda
- Clade: Pancrustacea
- Class: Insecta
- Order: Lepidoptera
- Family: Glyphipterigidae
- Genus: Glyphipterix
- Species: G. basifasciata

Binomial name
- Glyphipterix basifasciata Issiki, 1931

Synonyms
- Glyphipteryx jezonica Matsumura, 1931

Species of moth

Glyphipterix basifasciata is a species of sedge moth in the genus Glyphipterix. It was described by Syuti Issiki in 1931. It is found in Japan (Hokkaido, Honshu, Shikoku) and on the Kuril Islands.

The wingspan is 11–15 mm.
