= Phyllonorycter nipponicella =

Scientific classification
- Kingdom: Animalia
- Phylum: Arthropoda
- Class: Insecta
- Order: Lepidoptera
- Family: Gracillariidae
- Genus: Phyllonorycter
- Species: P. nipponicella

Binomial name
- Phyllonorycter nipponicella (Kumata, 1963)

Synonyms
- Lithocolletis nipponicella Kumata, 1963

Species of moth

Phyllonorycter nipponicella is a moth of the family Gracillariidae. It is known from Honshū island of Japan, and from Korea and the Russian Far East.

The wingspan is 7-8.5 mm.

The larvae feed on Quercus acutissima and Quercus variabilis. They mine the leaves of their host plant.
