= Phyllonorycter gigas =

Scientific classification
- Kingdom: Animalia
- Phylum: Arthropoda
- Class: Insecta
- Order: Lepidoptera
- Family: Gracillariidae
- Genus: Phyllonorycter
- Species: P. gigas

Binomial name
- Phyllonorycter gigas (Kumata, 1963)

Synonyms
- Lithocolletis gigas Kumata, 1963

Species of moth

Phyllonorycter gigas is a moth of the family Gracillariidae. It is known from Honshu island of Japan.

The wingspan is about 11 mm.
