= Stigmella zelkoviella =

Scientific classification
- Kingdom: Animalia
- Phylum: Arthropoda
- Clade: Pancrustacea
- Class: Insecta
- Order: Lepidoptera
- Family: Nepticulidae
- Genus: Stigmella
- Species: S. zelkoviella

Binomial name
- Stigmella zelkoviella Kemperman & Wilkinson, 1985

Species of moth

Stigmella zelkoviella is a moth of the family Nepticulidae. It is only known from Kyushu in Japan.

Adults are on wing from the end of April. There are probably two to three generations per year.

The larvae feed on Zelkova serrata. They mine the leaves of their host plant.
