= Phyllonorycter leucocorona =

Scientific classification
- Kingdom: Animalia
- Phylum: Arthropoda
- Class: Insecta
- Order: Lepidoptera
- Family: Gracillariidae
- Genus: Phyllonorycter
- Species: P. leucocorona

Binomial name
- Phyllonorycter leucocorona (Kumata, 1957)

Synonyms
- Lithocolletis leucocorona Kumata, 1957; Phyllonorycter leucocorna Kogi, 2005

Species of moth

Phyllonorycter leucocorona is a moth of the family Gracillariidae. It is known from the islands of Hokkaidō, Honshū and Kyūshū in Japan.

The larvae feed on Quercus dentata and Quercus serrata. They mine the leaves of their host plant.
