= Stigmella omelkoi =

Scientific classification
- Kingdom: Animalia
- Phylum: Arthropoda
- Class: Insecta
- Order: Lepidoptera
- Family: Nepticulidae
- Genus: Stigmella
- Species: S. omelkoi

Binomial name
- Stigmella omelkoi Puplesis, 1984

Synonyms
- Stigmella kumatai Kemperman & Wilkinson, 1985

Species of moth

Stigmella omelkoi is a moth of the family Nepticulidae. It is found in Russia (Primorskiy Kray), Japan (Hokkaido) and China (Heilongjiang).

The wingspan is 4.7-5.6 mm. There are two generations per year. Adults are on wing in May–June and again from July to early September.

The larvae feed on Quercus mongolica (including var. grosseserrata in Japan) and Quercus serrata (in Japan). They mine the leaves of their host plant.
