= Bucculatrix comporabile =

Scientific classification
- Kingdom: Animalia
- Phylum: Arthropoda
- Clade: Pancrustacea
- Class: Insecta
- Order: Lepidoptera
- Family: Bucculatricidae
- Genus: Bucculatrix
- Species: B. comporabile

Binomial name
- Bucculatrix comporabile Seksjaeva, 1989

Species of moth

Bucculatrix comporabile is a moth in the family Bucculatricidae. It was described by Svetlana Seksjaeva in 1989. It is found in the Russian Far East (Primorsky Krai) and Japan (Hokkaido, Honshu).

The wingspan is 6–7 mm.

The larvae feed on Quercus crispula, Quercus dentata and possibly Quercus serrata. They mine the leaves of their host plant.
