= Phyllonorycter pterocaryae =

Scientific classification
- Kingdom: Animalia
- Phylum: Arthropoda
- Class: Insecta
- Order: Lepidoptera
- Family: Gracillariidae
- Genus: Phyllonorycter
- Species: P. pterocaryae

Binomial name
- Phyllonorycter pterocaryae (Kumata, 1963)

Synonyms
- Lithocolletis pterocaryae Kumata, 1963

Species of moth

Phyllonorycter pterocaryae is a moth of the family Gracillariidae. It is known from the island of Hokkaidō in Japan from the Russian Far East.

The wingspan is 5–6 mm.

The larvae feed on Juglans ailanthifolia, Juglans mandschurica, Juglans regia, and Pterocarya rhoifolia. They mine the leaves of their host plant.
