= Stigmella dentatae =

Scientific classification
- Kingdom: Animalia
- Phylum: Arthropoda
- Clade: Pancrustacea
- Class: Insecta
- Order: Lepidoptera
- Family: Nepticulidae
- Genus: Stigmella
- Species: S. dentatae

Binomial name
- Stigmella dentatae Puplesis, 1984

Synonyms
- Stigmella pulla Kemperman & Wilkinson, 1985

Species of moth

Stigmella dentatae is a moth of the family Nepticulidae. It is found in Japan (Hokkaido), Russia (Primorsky Krai) and China (Heilongjiang).

The wingspan is 5.1–6.4 mm (0.20–0.25 in). Adults are on wing in May and again from July to September. There are two generations per year.

The larvae feed on Quercus mongolica (including var. grosseserrata in Japan) and Quercus dentata (in Primorskiy Kray). They mine the leaves of their host plant.
