= Caloptilia hidakensis =

Scientific classification
- Kingdom: Animalia
- Phylum: Arthropoda
- Class: Insecta
- Order: Lepidoptera
- Family: Gracillariidae
- Genus: Caloptilia
- Species: C. hidakensis

Binomial name
- Caloptilia hidakensis Kumata, 1966

Species of moth

Caloptilia hidakensis is a moth of the family Gracillariidae. It is known from the islands of Hokkaidō and Honshū in Japan and from the Russian Far East.

The wingspan is about 11 mm.

The larvae feed on Acer mono. They probably mine the leaves of their host plant.
