= Glyphipterix japonicella =

Scientific classification
- Kingdom: Animalia
- Phylum: Arthropoda
- Clade: Pancrustacea
- Class: Insecta
- Order: Lepidoptera
- Family: Glyphipterigidae
- Genus: Glyphipterix
- Species: G. japonicella

Binomial name
- Glyphipterix japonicella Zeller, 1877

Species of moth

Glyphipterix japonicella is a species of sedge moth in the genus Glyphipterix. It was described by Philipp Christoph Zeller in 1877. It is found in Japan.

The wingspan is 12–16 mm.
