= Stigmella tranocrossa =

Scientific classification
- Kingdom: Animalia
- Phylum: Arthropoda
- Clade: Pancrustacea
- Class: Insecta
- Order: Lepidoptera
- Family: Nepticulidae
- Genus: Stigmella
- Species: S. tranocrossa

Binomial name
- Stigmella tranocrossa Kemperman & Wilkinson, 1985

Synonyms
- Stigmella ussurica Puplesis, 1987

Species of moth

Stigmella tranocrossa is a moth of the family Nepticulidae. It is found in Hokkaido in Japan and the Russian Far East (Primorsky Krai).

There are probably two or more generations per year since adults occur in July from September to October.
