= Stigmella ultima =

Scientific classification
- Kingdom: Animalia
- Phylum: Arthropoda
- Class: Insecta
- Order: Lepidoptera
- Family: Nepticulidae
- Genus: Stigmella
- Species: S. ultima

Binomial name
- Stigmella ultima Puplesis, 1984

Species of moth

Stigmella ultima is a moth of the family Nepticulidae. It is found in eastern Asia, including the Primorye region in Russia and in Japan. It is probably also present in north-eastern China.

The larvae feed on Acer mono and Acer platanoides.
