= Phyllonorycter watanabei =

Scientific classification
- Kingdom: Animalia
- Phylum: Arthropoda
- Class: Insecta
- Order: Lepidoptera
- Family: Gracillariidae
- Genus: Phyllonorycter
- Species: P. watanabei

Binomial name
- Phyllonorycter watanabei (Kumata, 1963)

Synonyms
- Lithocolletis watanabei Kumata, 1963

Species of moth

Phyllonorycter watanabei is a moth of the family Gracillariidae. It is known from the islands of Hokkaido, Shikoku, Honshu and Kyushu in Japan and from the Russian Far East.

The wingspan is 5.5–6 mm.

The larvae feed as leaf miners on Pourthiaea villosa and Pyrus ussuriensis. The mine is ptychonomous and located in the space between two veins of the lower surface of the leaf.
