= Liopycnas =

Scientific classification
- Kingdom: Animalia
- Phylum: Arthropoda
- Clade: Pancrustacea
- Class: Insecta
- Order: Lepidoptera
- Family: Tineidae
- Subfamily: Myrmecozelinae
- Genus: Liopycnas; Meyrick, 1937
- Species: L. percnombra

Binomial name
- Liopycnas percnombra Meyrick, 1937

Genus of moths

Liopycnas is a genus of moths belonging to the family Tineidae. It contains only one species, Liopycnas percnombra, which is found in Japan.
