= Phyllonorycter bicinctella =

Scientific classification
- Kingdom: Animalia
- Phylum: Arthropoda
- Clade: Pancrustacea
- Class: Insecta
- Order: Lepidoptera
- Family: Gracillariidae
- Genus: Phyllonorycter
- Species: P. bicinctella

Binomial name
- Phyllonorycter bicinctella (Matsumura, 1931)

Synonyms
- Lithocolletis bicinctella Matsumura, 1931

Species of moth

Phyllonorycter bicinctella is a moth of the family Gracillariidae. It is known from Hokkaido island of Japan and the Russian Far East.

The larvae feed on Ulmus davidiana var. japonica, Quercus crispula and Ulmus pumila. They mine the leaves of their host plant.
