= Phyllonorycter kurokoi =

Scientific classification
- Kingdom: Animalia
- Phylum: Arthropoda
- Class: Insecta
- Order: Lepidoptera
- Family: Gracillariidae
- Genus: Phyllonorycter
- Species: P. kurokoi

Binomial name
- Phyllonorycter kurokoi (Kumata, 1963)

Synonyms
- Lithocolletis kurokoi Kumata, 1963

Species of moth

Phyllonorycter kurokoi is a moth of the family Gracillariidae. It is known from Kyushu island of Japan.

The wingspan is 7-7.5 mm.

The larvae feed as leaf miners on Acer mono. The mine is situated on the lower surface of the leaf.
