= Phyllonorycter tritorrhecta =

Scientific classification
- Kingdom: Animalia
- Phylum: Arthropoda
- Class: Insecta
- Order: Lepidoptera
- Family: Gracillariidae
- Genus: Phyllonorycter
- Species: P. tritorrhecta

Binomial name
- Phyllonorycter tritorrhecta (Meyrick, 1935)

Synonyms
- Lithocolletis tritorrhecta Meyrick, 1935

Species of moth

Phyllonorycter tritorrhecta is a moth of the family Gracillariidae. It is known from Honshu island in Japan.

The wingspan is 5–6 mm.

The larvae feed on Zelkova serrata. They mine the leaves of their host plant. The mine is ptychonomous and created on the upper surface of the leaves.
