= Glyphipterix nigromarginata =

Scientific classification
- Kingdom: Animalia
- Phylum: Arthropoda
- Clade: Pancrustacea
- Class: Insecta
- Order: Lepidoptera
- Family: Glyphipterigidae
- Genus: Glyphipterix
- Species: G. nigromarginata

Binomial name
- Glyphipterix nigromarginata Issiki, 1930

Synonyms
- Glyphipteryx suzukii Matsumura, 1931

Species of moth

Glyphipterix nigromarginata is a species of sedge moth in the genus Glyphipterix. It was described by Syuti Issiki in 1930. It is found in Japan.

The wingspan is 11–13 mm.
