= Phyllonorycter ermani =

Scientific classification
- Kingdom: Animalia
- Phylum: Arthropoda
- Class: Insecta
- Order: Lepidoptera
- Family: Gracillariidae
- Genus: Phyllonorycter
- Species: P. ermani

Binomial name
- Phyllonorycter ermani (Kumata, 1963)

Synonyms
- Lithocolletis ermani Kumata, 1963

Species of moth

Phyllonorycter ermani is a moth of the family Gracillariidae. It is known from the island of Hokkaidō in Japan and the Russian Far East.

The wingspan is 7-8.5 mm.

The larvae feed on Alnus maximowiczii and Betula ermanii. They mine the leaves of their host plant.
