= Glyphipterix scleriae =

Scientific classification
- Kingdom: Animalia
- Phylum: Arthropoda
- Clade: Pancrustacea
- Class: Insecta
- Order: Lepidoptera
- Family: Glyphipterigidae
- Genus: Glyphipterix
- Species: G. scleriae

Binomial name
- Glyphipterix scleriae Arita, 1987

Species of moth

Glyphipterix scleriae is a species of sedge moth in the genus Glyphipterix. It was described by Yutaka Arita in 1987. It is found in Japan.
