= Phyllonorycter hikosana =

Scientific classification
- Kingdom: Animalia
- Phylum: Arthropoda
- Class: Insecta
- Order: Lepidoptera
- Family: Gracillariidae
- Genus: Phyllonorycter
- Species: P. hikosana

Binomial name
- Phyllonorycter hikosana (Kumata, 1963)

Synonyms
- Lithocolletis hikosana Kumata, 1963

Species of moth

Phyllonorycter hikosana is a moth of the family Gracillariidae. It is known from Kyūshū island of Japan.

The larvae feed on Carpinus tschonoskii. They mine the leaves of their host plant.
