= Stigmella kurilensis =

Scientific classification
- Kingdom: Animalia
- Phylum: Arthropoda
- Class: Insecta
- Order: Lepidoptera
- Family: Nepticulidae
- Genus: Stigmella
- Species: S. kurilensis

Binomial name
- Stigmella kurilensis Puplesis, 1987

Species of moth

Stigmella kurilensis is a moth of the family Nepticulidae. It is only known from Hokkaido (Japan) and Kunashiri Island (southern Kurils).

Adults are on wing in early June and August. There are probably two generations per year.

The host plant is unknown.
