= Kurokopteryx dolichocerata =

Scientific classification
- Kingdom: Animalia
- Phylum: Arthropoda
- Class: Insecta
- Order: Lepidoptera
- Family: Micropterigidae
- Genus: Kurokopteryx
- Species: K. dolichocerata

Binomial name
- Kurokopteryx dolichocerata Hashimoto, 2006

Moth species in family Micropterigidae

Kurokopteryx dolichocerata is a species of moth belonging to the family Micropterigidae. It was described by Hashimoto in 2006 and is endemic to Japan.

The length of the forewings is 4.2–4.9 millimetres (0.17–0.19 in) for males and 4.1-4.8 mm for females.
