= Caloptilia issikii =

Scientific classification
- Kingdom: Animalia
- Phylum: Arthropoda
- Class: Insecta
- Order: Lepidoptera
- Family: Gracillariidae
- Genus: Caloptilia
- Species: C. issikii

Binomial name
- Caloptilia issikii Kumata, 1982

Species of moth

Caloptilia issikii is a moth of the family Gracillariidae. It is known from China, Japan (the islands of Hokkaidō and Honshū) and the Russian Far East.

The wingspan is 10.8-11.5 mm.

The larvae feed on Alnus species, including Alnus japonica. They mine the leaves of their host plant.
