= Acrocercops transecta =

Scientific classification
- Kingdom: Animalia
- Phylum: Arthropoda
- Class: Insecta
- Order: Lepidoptera
- Family: Gracillariidae
- Genus: Acrocercops
- Species: A. transecta

Binomial name
- Acrocercops transecta Meyrick, 1931

Synonyms
- Acrocercops lyonella (Kuznetzov & Baryshnikova, 1998); Acrocercops lyoniella Kuroko, 1982

Species of moth

Acrocercops transecta is a moth of the family Gracillariidae. It is known from Japan (Hokkaidō, Honshū, Kyūshū, Shikoku, Tusima), Korea, the Russian Far East and Taiwan.

The wingspan is 7.4–9.6 mm.

The larvae feed on Lyonia ovalifolia, Carya aquatica, Carya myristiciformis, Carya ovata, Juglans ailanthifolia, Juglans cinerea, Juglans cordiformis, Juglans hindsii, Juglans illinoensis, Juglans mandschurica, Juglans nigra, Juglans regia, Juglans sieboldiana, Platycarya strobilacea and Pterocarya rhoifolia. They mine the leaves of their host plant.
