= Stigmella boehmeriae =

Scientific classification
- Kingdom: Animalia
- Phylum: Arthropoda
- Clade: Pancrustacea
- Class: Insecta
- Order: Lepidoptera
- Family: Nepticulidae
- Genus: Stigmella
- Species: S. boehmeriae

Binomial name
- Stigmella boehmeriae Kemperman & Wilkinson, 1985

Species of moth

Stigmella boehmeriae is a moth of the family Nepticulidae. It is only known from Kyushu in Japan.

Adults are on wing from mid-April, late July and late August. There are probably four or more generations per year.

The larvae feed on Boehmeria nipononivea and Boehmeria spicata. They mine the leaves of their host plant.
