= Stigmella nakamurai =

Scientific classification
- Kingdom: Animalia
- Phylum: Arthropoda
- Clade: Pancrustacea
- Class: Insecta
- Order: Lepidoptera
- Family: Nepticulidae
- Genus: Stigmella
- Species: S. nakamurai

Binomial name
- Stigmella nakamurai Kemperman & Wilkinson, 1985

Species of moth

Stigmella nakamurai is a moth of the family Nepticulidae. It is only known from Hokkaido in Japan.

Adults are on wing in August. There is probably one generation per year.

The larvae feed on Ulmus davidiana var. japonica. They mine the leaves of their host plant.
