= Stigmella cathepostis =

Scientific classification
- Kingdom: Animalia
- Phylum: Arthropoda
- Clade: Pancrustacea
- Class: Insecta
- Order: Lepidoptera
- Family: Nepticulidae
- Genus: Stigmella
- Species: S. cathepostis

Binomial name
- Stigmella cathepostis Kemperman & Wilkinson, 1985

Species of moth

Stigmella cathepostis is a moth of the family Nepticulidae. It is only known from Kyushu in Japan and the Russian Far East (Primorskiy Kray).

There might be up to three generations per year.

The larvae feed on Carpinus tschonoskii. They mine the leaves of their host plant.
