= Caloptilia callicarpae =

Scientific classification
- Domain: Eukaryota
- Kingdom: Animalia
- Phylum: Arthropoda
- Class: Insecta
- Order: Lepidoptera
- Family: Gracillariidae
- Genus: Caloptilia
- Species: C. callicarpae

Binomial name
- Caloptilia callicarpae Kumata, 1982

Species of insect

Caloptilia callicarpae is a moth of the family Gracillariidae. It is known from Japan (Shikoku, the Ryukyu Islands).

The wingspan is 6.5-8.2 mm.

The larvae feed on Callicarpa species, including Callicarpa japonica. They mine the leaves of their host plant.
