= Phyllonorycter viciae =

Scientific classification
- Kingdom: Animalia
- Phylum: Arthropoda
- Class: Insecta
- Order: Lepidoptera
- Family: Gracillariidae
- Genus: Phyllonorycter
- Species: P. viciae

Binomial name
- Phyllonorycter viciae (Kumata, 1963)

Synonyms
- Lithocolletis viciae Kumata, 1963

Species of moth

Phyllonorycter viciae is a moth of the family Gracillariidae. It can be found on Hokkaido island in Japan and in the Russian Far East.

The wingspan is 6–7 mm.
