= Stigmella caesurifasciella =

Scientific classification
- Kingdom: Animalia
- Phylum: Arthropoda
- Clade: Pancrustacea
- Class: Insecta
- Order: Lepidoptera
- Family: Nepticulidae
- Genus: Stigmella
- Species: S. caesurifasciella

Binomial name
- Stigmella caesurifasciella Kemperman & Wilkinson, 1985

Synonyms
- Stigmella egregilustrata Kemperman & Wilkinson, 1985

Species of moth

Stigmella caesurifasciella is a moth of the family Nepticulidae. It is only known from Honshu and Kyushu in Japan, but is probably also present in China.

The larvae feed on Cyclobalanopsis glauca and Cyclobalanopsis acuta. They mine the leaves of their host plant.
