= Caloptilia alni =

Scientific classification
- Kingdom: Animalia
- Phylum: Arthropoda
- Class: Insecta
- Order: Lepidoptera
- Family: Gracillariidae
- Genus: Caloptilia
- Species: C. alni

Binomial name
- Caloptilia alni Kumata, 1966

Species of moth

Caloptilia alni is a moth of the family Gracillariidae. It is known from China, Japan (Honshū, Hokkaidō), Korea and the Russian Far East.

The wingspan is 14.5–16 mm.

The larvae feed on Alnus hirsuta and Alnus japonica. They probably mine the leaves of their host plant.
