= Phyllonorycter ginnalae =

Scientific classification
- Domain: Eukaryota
- Kingdom: Animalia
- Phylum: Arthropoda
- Class: Insecta
- Order: Lepidoptera
- Family: Gracillariidae
- Genus: Phyllonorycter
- Species: P. ginnalae

Binomial name
- Phyllonorycter ginnalae (Ermolaev, 1981)

Species of moth

Phyllonorycter ginnalae is a moth of the family Gracillariidae. It is known from the Russian Far East and Honshū island of Japan.

The larvae feed on Acer species, including Acer ginnala. They probably mine the leaves of their host plant.
