= Glyphipterix beta =

Scientific classification
- Kingdom: Animalia
- Phylum: Arthropoda
- Clade: Pancrustacea
- Class: Insecta
- Order: Lepidoptera
- Family: Glyphipterigidae
- Genus: Glyphipterix
- Species: G. beta

Binomial name
- Glyphipterix beta Moriuti & Saito, 1964

Synonyms
- Glyphipteryx japonicella Matsumura, 1931 (nec Zeller, 1877)

Species of moth

Glyphipterix beta is a species of sedge moth in the genus Glyphipterix. It is found in Japan and on the Kuril Islands.

The wingspan is 12–16 mm.
