= Ketapangia leucochorda =

Scientific classification
- Kingdom: Animalia
- Phylum: Arthropoda
- Class: Insecta
- Order: Lepidoptera
- Family: Gracillariidae
- Genus: Ketapangia
- Species: K. leucochorda

Binomial name
- Ketapangia leucochorda (Meyrick, 1908)

Synonyms
- Macarostola leucochorda Meyrick, 1908; Parectopa leucochorda

Species of moth

Ketapangia leucochorda is a moth of the family Gracillariidae. It is known from India (the states of Karnataka and Maharashtra), Japan (the Ogasawara Islands) and Kiribati (the Gilbert Islands).

The wingspan is 7.1–8.2 mm.

The larvae feed on Terminalia catappa and Terminalia chebula. They mine the leaves of their host plant.
