= Caloptilia leucothoes =

Scientific classification
- Kingdom: Animalia
- Phylum: Arthropoda
- Class: Insecta
- Order: Lepidoptera
- Family: Gracillariidae
- Genus: Caloptilia
- Species: C. leucothoes

Binomial name
- Caloptilia leucothoes Kumata, 1982

Species of moth

Caloptilia leucothoes is a moth of the family Gracillariidae. It is known from the islands of Hokkaidō, Honshū and Kyūshū in Japan, from the Russian Far East and from Korea.

The wingspan is 8.2–11 mm.

The larvae feed on Leucothoe grayana, Menziesia pentandra and Rhododendron species, including Rhododendron albrechti, Rhododendron dauricum, Rhododendron dilatatum and Rhododendron reticulatum. They mine the leaves of their host plant.
