= Phyllonorycter laciniatae =

Scientific classification
- Kingdom: Animalia
- Phylum: Arthropoda
- Class: Insecta
- Order: Lepidoptera
- Family: Gracillariidae
- Genus: Phyllonorycter
- Species: P. laciniatae

Binomial name
- Phyllonorycter laciniatae (Kumata, 1967)

Synonyms
- Lithocolletis laciniatae Kumata, 1967

Species of moth

Phyllonorycter laciniatae is a moth of the family Gracillariidae. It is known from Hokkaidō island of Japan and from the Russian Far East.

The wingspan is 6.5-7.5 mm.

The larvae feed on Ulmus japonica, Ulmus laciniata, Ulmus propinqua and Ulmus pumila. They mine the leaves of their host plant.
