= Phyllonorycter styracis =

Scientific classification
- Kingdom: Animalia
- Phylum: Arthropoda
- Class: Insecta
- Order: Lepidoptera
- Family: Gracillariidae
- Genus: Phyllonorycter
- Species: P. styracis

Binomial name
- Phyllonorycter styracis (Kumata, 1963)

Synonyms
- Lithocolletis styracis Kumata, 1963

Species of moth

Phyllonorycter styracis is a moth of the family Gracillariidae. It is known from Kyūshū, Japan.

The wingspan is 7–8 mm.

The larvae feed on Styrax japonicus. They mine the leaves of their host plant.
