= Phyllonorycter takagii =

Scientific classification
- Kingdom: Animalia
- Phylum: Arthropoda
- Class: Insecta
- Order: Lepidoptera
- Family: Gracillariidae
- Genus: Phyllonorycter
- Species: P. takagii

Binomial name
- Phyllonorycter takagii (Kumata, 1963)

Synonyms
- Lithocolletis takagii Kumata, 1963

Species of moth

Phyllonorycter takagii is a moth of the family Gracillariidae. It is known from the island of Honshū in Japan and from the Russian Far East.

The wingspan is 5.5–6 mm.

The larvae feed on Alnus japonica. They mine the leaves of their host plant.
