= Nemophora karafutonis =

Scientific classification
- Kingdom: Animalia
- Phylum: Arthropoda
- Clade: Pancrustacea
- Class: Insecta
- Order: Lepidoptera
- Family: Adelidae
- Genus: Nemophora
- Species: N. karafutonis

Binomial name
- Nemophora karafutonis (Matsumura, 1932)

Synonyms
- Nemotois karafutonis Matsumura, 1932; Nemophora moriokensis Okano, 1957

Species of moth

Nemophora karafutonis is a moth of the family Adelidae or fairy longhorn moths. It was described by Shōnen Matsumura in 1932. It is found in the Russian Far East and Japan.

The length of the forewings is 7–8.5 mm for males and 7–7.5 mm for females.

== Subspecies ==
- Nemophora karafutonis karafutonis
- Nemophora karafutonis moriokensis (Okano, 1957)
