= Phyllonorycter melacoronis =

Scientific classification
- Kingdom: Animalia
- Phylum: Arthropoda
- Class: Insecta
- Order: Lepidoptera
- Family: Gracillariidae
- Genus: Phyllonorycter
- Species: P. melacoronis

Binomial name
- Phyllonorycter melacoronis (Kumata, 1963)

Synonyms
- Lithocolletis melacoronis Kumata, 1963

Species of moth

Phyllonorycter melacoronis is a moth of the family Gracillariidae. It is known from Japan (Kyushu), the Russian Far East and Korea.

The wingspan is 5-5.5 mm.

The larvae feed as leaf miners on Rhododendron species, including Rhododendron dauricum and Rhododendron mucronulatum.
