= Caloptilia kisoensis =

Scientific classification
- Kingdom: Animalia
- Phylum: Arthropoda
- Class: Insecta
- Order: Lepidoptera
- Family: Gracillariidae
- Genus: Caloptilia
- Species: C. kisoensis

Binomial name
- Caloptilia kisoensis Kumata, 1982

Species of moth

Caloptilia kisoensis is a moth of the family Gracillariidae. It is known from Japan (Honshū), Korea and the Russian Far East.

The wingspan is 11–13.8 mm.

The larvae feed on Acer ginnala and Acer mono. They mine the leaves of their host plant.
