= Phyllonorycter persimilis =

Scientific classification
- Kingdom: Animalia
- Phylum: Arthropoda
- Class: Insecta
- Order: Lepidoptera
- Family: Gracillariidae
- Genus: Phyllonorycter
- Species: P. persimilis

Binomial name
- Phyllonorycter persimilis Fujihara, Sato & Kumata, 2001

Synonyms
- Phyllonorycter presimilis Kogi, 2005

Species of moth

Phyllonorycter persimilis is a moth of the family Gracillariidae. It is known from the islands of Honshū and Hokkaidō in Japan.

The larvae feed on Quercus dentata. They mine the leaves of their host plant.
