= Glyphipterix mikadonis =

Scientific classification
- Kingdom: Animalia
- Phylum: Arthropoda
- Clade: Pancrustacea
- Class: Insecta
- Order: Lepidoptera
- Family: Glyphipterigidae
- Genus: Glyphipterix
- Species: G. mikadonis

Binomial name
- Glyphipterix mikadonis Arita & Owada, 2006

Species of moth

Glyphipterix mikadonis is a species of sedge moth in the genus Glyphipterix which is endemic to Japan.

The wingspan is 10.5–12.5 millimetres (0.41–0.49 in). Adults have been recorded from the end of May to the beginning of June.
