= Phyllonorycter rostrispinosa =

Scientific classification
- Kingdom: Animalia
- Phylum: Arthropoda
- Class: Insecta
- Order: Lepidoptera
- Family: Gracillariidae
- Genus: Phyllonorycter
- Species: P. rostrispinosa

Binomial name
- Phyllonorycter rostrispinosa (Kumata, 1967)

Synonyms
- Lithocolletis rostrispinosa Kumata, 1967

Species of moth

Phyllonorycter rostrispinosa is a moth of the family Gracillariidae. It is known from the islands of Kyūshū and Honshū in Japan.

== Size ==
The wingspan is about 5.5 mm.

== Larvae ==
The larvae feed on Quercus serrata, Quercus acutissima and Quercus variabilis. They mine the leaves of their host plant.
