= Caloptilia querci =

Scientific classification
- Kingdom: Animalia
- Phylum: Arthropoda
- Class: Insecta
- Order: Lepidoptera
- Family: Gracillariidae
- Genus: Caloptilia
- Species: C. querci

Binomial name
- Caloptilia querci Kumata, 1982

Synonyms
- Povolnya querci (Kumata, 1982)

Species of moth

Caloptilia querci or Povolnya querci is a moth of the family Gracillariidae. It is known from Japan (Hokkaidō, Honshū, Kyūshū, the Ryukyu Islands) and Korea.

The wingspan is 12–14 mm. The larvae feed on Castanea crenata, Castanopsis cuspidata, Quercus acutissima, Quercus glauca, and Quercus mongolica. They mine the leaves of their host plant during early instars and roll the leaves during late instars.
