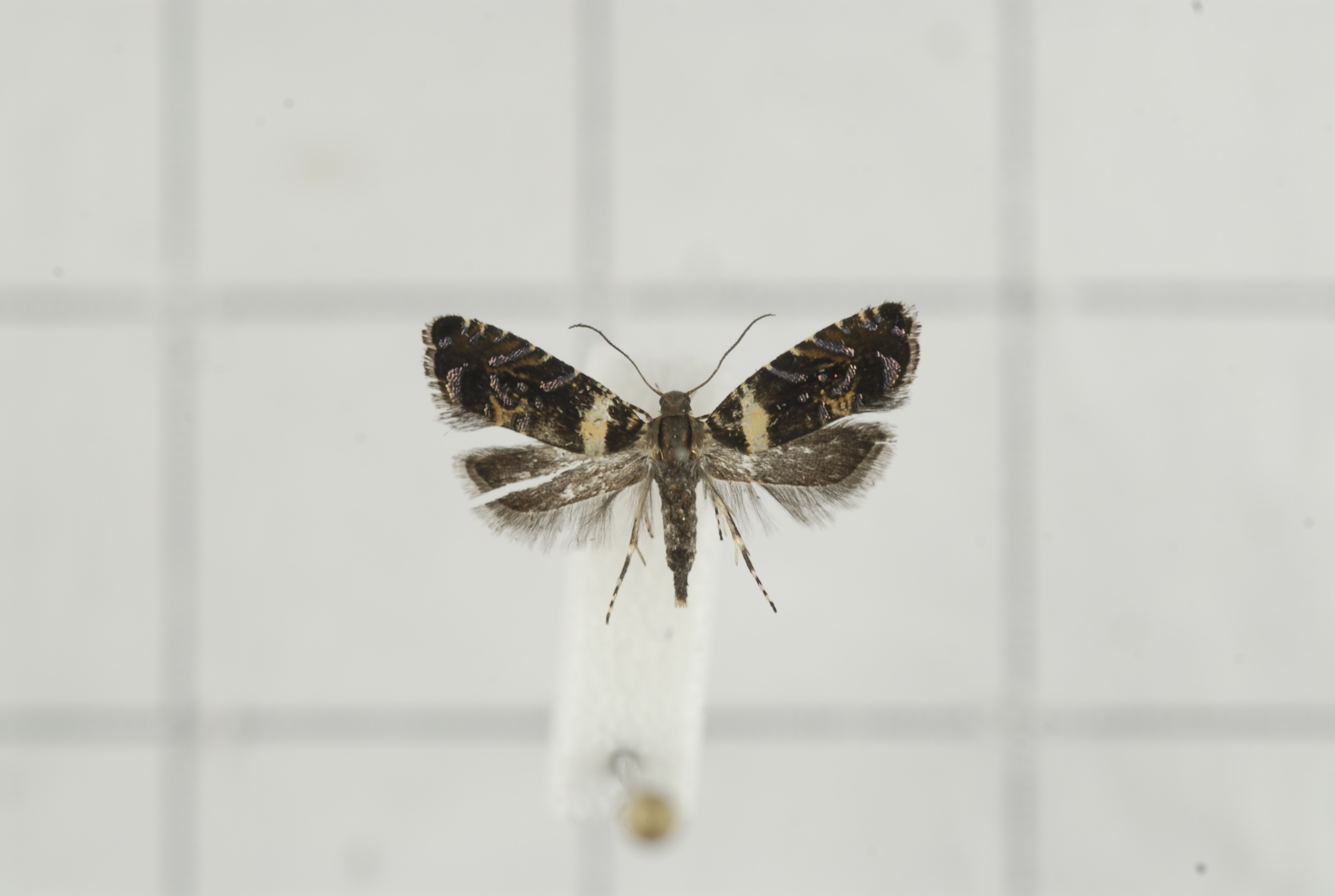

Scientific classification
- Kingdom: Animalia
- Phylum: Arthropoda
- Clade: Pancrustacea
- Class: Insecta
- Order: Lepidoptera
- Family: Glyphipterigidae
- Genus: Glyphipterix
- Species: G. gemmula

Binomial name
- Glyphipterix gemmula Diakonoff, 1976

= Glyphipterix gemmula =

Species of moth

Glyphipterix gemmula is a species of sedge moth in the genus Glyphipterix. It was described by Alexey Diakonoff in 1976. It is found in Japan and Taiwan.

The wingspan is 7–8 mm.
