= Phyllonorycter lonicerae =

Scientific classification
- Kingdom: Animalia
- Phylum: Arthropoda
- Class: Insecta
- Order: Lepidoptera
- Family: Gracillariidae
- Genus: Phyllonorycter
- Species: P. lonicerae

Binomial name
- Phyllonorycter lonicerae (Kumata, 1963)

Synonyms
- Lithocolletis lonicerae Kumata, 1963

Species of moth

Phyllonorycter lonicerae is a moth of the family Gracillariidae. It is known from the islands of Honshu, Shikoku and Kyushu in Japan and from China.

The wingspan is 6–7 mm.

The larvae feed as leaf miners on Lonicera japonica. The mine is slightly tentiform and located on the lower surface of the leaf.
