= Stigmella gimmonella =

Scientific classification
- Kingdom: Animalia
- Phylum: Arthropoda
- Clade: Pancrustacea
- Class: Insecta
- Order: Lepidoptera
- Family: Nepticulidae
- Genus: Stigmella
- Species: S. gimmonella

Binomial name
- Stigmella gimmonella (Matsumura, 1931)

Synonyms
- Nepticula gimmonella Matsumura, 1931

Species of moth

Stigmella gimmonella is a moth of the family Nepticulidae. It is only known from Hokkaido in Japan.

Adults are on wing from July to August and from May to June. There are probably two generations per year.

The larvae feed on Ulmus laciniata and Ulmus davidiana var. japonica. They mine the leaves of their host plant.
