= Caloptilia schisandrae =

Scientific classification
- Kingdom: Animalia
- Phylum: Arthropoda
- Class: Insecta
- Order: Lepidoptera
- Family: Gracillariidae
- Genus: Caloptilia
- Species: C. schisandrae

Binomial name
- Caloptilia schisandrae Kumata, 1966

Synonyms
- Caloptilia schizandrae Ermolaev, 1986

Species of moth

Caloptilia schisandrae is a moth of the family Gracillariidae. It is known from China (Zhejiang), Japan (Hokkaidō and Honshū), Korea and the Russian Far East.

The wingspan is 14.5-15.5 mm.

The larvae feed on Schisandra chinensis. They probably mine the leaves of their host plant.
