= Phyllonorycter longispinata =

Scientific classification
- Kingdom: Animalia
- Phylum: Arthropoda
- Class: Insecta
- Order: Lepidoptera
- Family: Gracillariidae
- Genus: Phyllonorycter
- Species: P. longispinata

Binomial name
- Phyllonorycter longispinata (Kumata, 1958)

Synonyms
- Lithocolletis longispinata Kumata, 1958

Species of moth

Phyllonorycter longispinata is a moth of the family Gracillariidae. It is known from the islands of Hokkaidō and Honshū in Japan.

The larvae feed on Alnus hirsuta and Alnus japonica. They mine the leaves of their host plant.
