= Stigmella hisaii =

Scientific classification
- Kingdom: Animalia
- Phylum: Arthropoda
- Class: Insecta
- Order: Lepidoptera
- Family: Nepticulidae
- Genus: Stigmella
- Species: S. hisaii

Binomial name
- Stigmella hisaii Kuroko, 2004

Species of moth

Stigmella hisaii is a moth of the family Nepticulidae. It is found in Japan.

The larvae feed on Castanopsis cuspidata. They probably mine the leaves of their host.
