= Caloptilia aceris =

Scientific classification
- Kingdom: Animalia
- Phylum: Arthropoda
- Class: Insecta
- Order: Lepidoptera
- Family: Gracillariidae
- Genus: Caloptilia
- Species: C. aceris

Binomial name
- Caloptilia aceris Kumata, 1966

Species of moth

Caloptilia aceris is a moth of the family Gracillariidae. It is known from China, Japan (Honshū, Hokkaidō), Korea and the Russian Far East.

The wingspan is 9.5–12 mm.

The larvae feed on Acer miyabei, Acer mono, Acer palmatum and Acer saccharum. They probably mine the leaves of their host plant.
