= Stigmella titivillitia =

Scientific classification
- Kingdom: Animalia
- Phylum: Arthropoda
- Clade: Pancrustacea
- Class: Insecta
- Order: Lepidoptera
- Family: Nepticulidae
- Genus: Stigmella
- Species: S. titivillitia

Binomial name
- Stigmella titivillitia Kemperman & Wilkinson, 1985

Species of moth

Stigmella titivillitia is a moth of the family Nepticulidae. It is only known from Hokkaido in Japan.

The larvae feed on Alnus japonica and Alnus hirsuta. They mine the leaves of their host plant.
