= Phyllonorycter juglandis =

Scientific classification
- Kingdom: Animalia
- Phylum: Arthropoda
- Class: Insecta
- Order: Lepidoptera
- Family: Gracillariidae
- Genus: Phyllonorycter
- Species: P. juglandis

Binomial name
- Phyllonorycter juglandis (Kumata, 1963)

Synonyms
- Lithocolletis juglandis Kumata, 1963

Species of moth

Phyllonorycter juglandis is a moth of the family Gracillariidae. It is known from Hokkaidō island in Japan.

The wingspan of this moth is 6.5–8 mm. The larvae feed on Juglans ailanthifolia and Pterocarya rhoifolia. They mine the leaves of their host plant.
