= Caloptilia celtidis =

Scientific classification
- Kingdom: Animalia
- Phylum: Arthropoda
- Class: Insecta
- Order: Lepidoptera
- Family: Gracillariidae
- Genus: Caloptilia
- Species: C. celtidis

Binomial name
- Caloptilia celtidis Kumata, 1982

Species of moth

Caloptilia celtidis is a moth of the family Gracillariidae. It is known from China (Zhejiang, Jiangxi, Shannxi, Sichuan, Anhui, Gansu, Guizhou, Hainan, Henan, Hubei, Hunan), Hong Kong and Japan (Kyūshū, Honshū).

The wingspan is 9.2–12 mm. Adults of the autumnal form are on wing in October and November, while the aestival form is on wing in July.

The larvae feed on Celtis jessoensis and Celtis sinensis. They mine the leaves of their host plant.
