= Phyllonorycter ringoniella =

Scientific classification
- Kingdom: Animalia
- Phylum: Arthropoda
- Clade: Pancrustacea
- Class: Insecta
- Order: Lepidoptera
- Family: Gracillariidae
- Genus: Phyllonorycter
- Species: P. ringoniella

Binomial name
- Phyllonorycter ringoniella (Matsumura, 1931)

Synonyms
- Lithocolletis ringoniella Matsumura, 1931

Species of moth

Phyllonorycter ringoniella is a moth of the family Gracillariidae. It is known from Japan (Hokkaido and Honshu), China, Korea and the Russian Far East.

The wingspan is 6.5-7.5 mm.

The larvae feed on Malus pumila, Malus baccata, Malus domestica, Malus mandshurica, Malus sieboldii, Malus toringo, Prunus avium, Prunus salicina and Pyrus species. They mine the leaves of their host plant.
