= Caloptilia magnoliae =

Scientific classification
- Kingdom: Animalia
- Phylum: Arthropoda
- Clade: Pancrustacea
- Class: Insecta
- Order: Lepidoptera
- Family: Gracillariidae
- Genus: Caloptilia
- Species: C. magnoliae

Binomial name
- Caloptilia magnoliae Kumata, 1966

Species of moth

Caloptilia magnoliae is a moth of the family Gracillariidae. It is known from the islands of Hokkaidō and Honshū in Japan and from Korea.

The wingspan is 14.5–15.5 mm.

The larvae feed on Magnolia heptapetala, Magnolia hypoleuca and Magnolia kobus. They probably mine the leaves of their host plant.
