= Phyllonorycter aino =

Scientific classification
- Kingdom: Animalia
- Phylum: Arthropoda
- Class: Insecta
- Order: Lepidoptera
- Family: Gracillariidae
- Genus: Phyllonorycter
- Species: P. aino

Binomial name
- Phyllonorycter aino (Kumata, 1963)

Synonyms
- Lithocolletis aino Kumata, 1963

Species of moth

Phyllonorycter aino is a moth of the family Gracillariidae. It is known from the island of Hokkaido in Japan and Korea.

The wingspan is 5.5–6 mm.

The larvae feed as leaf miners on Spiraea salicifolia. The mine is ptychonomous and located on the lower surface of the leaf.
