= Glyphipterix funditrix =

Scientific classification
- Kingdom: Animalia
- Phylum: Arthropoda
- Clade: Pancrustacea
- Class: Insecta
- Order: Lepidoptera
- Family: Glyphipterigidae
- Genus: Glyphipterix
- Species: G. funditrix

Binomial name
- Glyphipterix funditrix Diakonoff, 1976

Species of moth

Glyphipterix funditrix is a species of sedge moth in the genus Glyphipterix. It was described by Alexey Diakonoff in 1976. It is found in Japan (Hokkaido).

The wingspan is 8–11 mm.
