= Stigmella kurokoi =

Scientific classification
- Kingdom: Animalia
- Phylum: Arthropoda
- Class: Insecta
- Order: Lepidoptera
- Family: Nepticulidae
- Genus: Stigmella
- Species: S. kurokoi

Binomial name
- Stigmella kurokoi Puplesis, 1984

Synonyms
- Stigmella valvaurigemmata Kemperman & Wilkinson, 1985

Species of moth

Stigmella kurokoi is a species of moth in the family Nepticulidae. It is only known from Japan (Kyushu and Hokkaido) and Russia (Primorskiy Kray), but is probably also present in China. The larvae are leaf miners who feed on Quercus dentata, producing a linear mine.
