= Stigmella vittata =

Scientific classification
- Kingdom: Animalia
- Phylum: Arthropoda
- Clade: Pancrustacea
- Class: Insecta
- Order: Lepidoptera
- Family: Nepticulidae
- Genus: Stigmella
- Species: S. vittata

Binomial name
- Stigmella vittata Kemperman & Wilkinson, 1985

Species of moth

Stigmella vittata is a moth of the family Nepticulidae. It is only known from Honshu in Japan.

Adults are on wing from early May. There are two to three generations per year.

The larvae feed on Salix species, including Salix gracilistyla. They mine the leaves of their host plant.
