= Caloptilia chrysolampra =

Scientific classification
- Kingdom: Animalia
- Phylum: Arthropoda
- Class: Insecta
- Order: Lepidoptera
- Family: Gracillariidae
- Genus: Caloptilia
- Species: C. chrysolampra

Binomial name
- Caloptilia chrysolampra (Meyrick, 1936)

Synonyms
- Gracilaria chrysolampra Meyrick, 1936

Species of moth

Caloptilia chrysolampra is a moth of the family Gracillariidae. It is known from China, Japan (Honshū, Kyūshū, Shikoku), Korea and Taiwan.

The wingspan is 8.2–9.2 mm.

The larvae feed on Populus nigra and Salix species, including Salix babylonica and Salix pseudo-lasiopyne. They mine the leaves of their host plant.
