= Stigmella sesplicata =

Scientific classification
- Kingdom: Animalia
- Phylum: Arthropoda
- Clade: Pancrustacea
- Class: Insecta
- Order: Lepidoptera
- Family: Nepticulidae
- Genus: Stigmella
- Species: S. sesplicata

Binomial name
- Stigmella sesplicata Kemperman & Wilkinson, 1985

Species of moth

Stigmella sesplicata is a moth of the family Nepticulidae. It is found in Japan (Kyushu).

The larvae feed on Rhododendron species. They probably mine the leaves of their host plant.

== Taxonomy ==
It was previously treated as a synonym of Stigmella lediella.
