= Phyllonorycter fagifolia =

Scientific classification
- Kingdom: Animalia
- Phylum: Arthropoda
- Class: Insecta
- Order: Lepidoptera
- Family: Gracillariidae
- Genus: Phyllonorycter
- Species: P. fagifolia

Binomial name
- Phyllonorycter fagifolia (Kumata, 1963)

Synonyms
- Lithocolletis fagifolia Kumata, 1963

Species of moth

Phyllonorycter fagifolia is a moth of the family Gracillariidae. It is known from the islands of Hokkaidō and Kyūshū in Japan.

The wingspan is 5.5-6.5 mm.

The larvae feed on Fagus crenata. They mine the leaves of their host plant.
