= Phyllonorycter hancola =

Scientific classification
- Kingdom: Animalia
- Phylum: Arthropoda
- Class: Insecta
- Order: Lepidoptera
- Family: Gracillariidae
- Genus: Phyllonorycter
- Species: P. hancola

Binomial name
- Phyllonorycter hancola (Kumata, 1958)

Synonyms
- Lithocolletis hancola Kumata, 1958

Species of moth

Phyllonorycter hancola is a moth of the family Gracillariidae. It is known from the islands of Hokkaidō and Honshū in Japan and from the Russian Far East.

The larvae feed on Alnus hirsuta and Alnus japonica. They mine the leaves of their host plant.
