= Caloptilia pyrrhaspis =

Scientific classification
- Kingdom: Animalia
- Phylum: Arthropoda
- Class: Insecta
- Order: Lepidoptera
- Family: Gracillariidae
- Genus: Caloptilia
- Species: C. pyrrhaspis

Binomial name
- Caloptilia pyrrhaspis (Meyrick, 1931)

Synonyms
- Caloptilia bicolor Ermolaev, 1977

Species of moth

Caloptilia pyrrhaspis is a moth of the family Gracillariidae. It is known from China (Sichuan), Japan (Hokkaidō, Honshū) and the Russian Far East.

The wingspan is 11–12 mm.

The larvae feed on Betula dahurica, Betula ermanii, Betula grossa and Betula platyphylla. They mine the leaves of their host plant.
