= Phyllonorycter kamijoi =

Scientific classification
- Kingdom: Animalia
- Phylum: Arthropoda
- Clade: Pancrustacea
- Class: Insecta
- Order: Lepidoptera
- Family: Gracillariidae
- Genus: Phyllonorycter
- Species: P. kamijoi

Binomial name
- Phyllonorycter kamijoi (Kumata, 1963)

Synonyms
- Lithocolletis kamijoi Kumata, 1963

Species of moth

Phyllonorycter kamijoi is a moth of the family Gracillariidae. It is known from the islands of Honshū and Kyūshū in Japan and from Korea.

The wingspan is 5.5-6.5 mm.

The larvae feed on Castanea crenata and Quercus acutissima. They mine the leaves of their host plant.
