= Phyllonorycter celtidis =

Scientific classification
- Kingdom: Animalia
- Phylum: Arthropoda
- Class: Insecta
- Order: Lepidoptera
- Family: Gracillariidae
- Genus: Phyllonorycter
- Species: P. celtidis

Binomial name
- Phyllonorycter celtidis (Kumata, 1963)

Synonyms
- Lithocolletis celtidis Kumata, 1963

Species of moth

Phyllonorycter celtidis is a moth of the family Gracillariidae. It is known from Hokkaido and Kyushu, Japan.

The wingspan is 6.5–7 mm (0.26–0.28 in).

The larvae feed as leaf miners on Celtis sinensis and Celtis jessoensis. The mine is ptychonomous and located on the lower surface of the leaves.
