= Caloptilia heringi =

Scientific classification
- Kingdom: Animalia
- Phylum: Arthropoda
- Class: Insecta
- Order: Lepidoptera
- Family: Gracillariidae
- Genus: Caloptilia
- Species: C. heringi

Binomial name
- Caloptilia heringi Kumata, 1966

Species of moth

Caloptilia heringi is a moth of the family Gracillariidae. It is known from Japan (Hokkaidō) and the Russian Far East.

The wingspan is 11.5–13 mm.

The larvae feed on Acer mono. They probably mine the leaves of their host plant.
