= Phyllonorycter orientalis =

Scientific classification
- Kingdom: Animalia
- Phylum: Arthropoda
- Class: Insecta
- Order: Lepidoptera
- Family: Gracillariidae
- Genus: Phyllonorycter
- Species: P. orientalis

Binomial name
- Phyllonorycter orientalis (Kumata, 1963)

Synonyms
- Lithocolletis orientalis Kumata, 1963

Species of moth

Phyllonorycter orientalis is a moth of the family Gracillariidae. It is known from the islands of Hokkaido and Kyushu in Japan and from the Russian Far East and Taiwan.

The wingspan is 5.5–6 mm.

The larvae feed as leaf miners on Acer species, including Acer mono, Acer palmatum and Acer carpinifolium. The mine is situated on the lower surface of the leaf.
