= Adela praepilosa =

Scientific classification
- Kingdom: Animalia
- Phylum: Arthropoda
- Clade: Pancrustacea
- Class: Insecta
- Order: Lepidoptera
- Family: Adelidae
- Genus: Adela
- Species: A. praepilosa

Binomial name
- Adela praepilosa (Hirowatari, 1997)

Species of moth

Adela praepilosa is a moth (order Lepidoptera) belonging to the family Adelidae, the fairy longhorn moths. Its Japanese name is kebuka higenaga (ケブカヒゲナガ).

== Distribution ==
Adela praepilosa is only known to exist in Japan. It was first described in 1997 after a revision of the genus Adela by the Japanese taxonomist Toshiya Hirowatari. Type specimens from Japan, housed at the Natural History Museum of London, were mistakenly labeled A. nobilis, a species distributed throughout much of Asia. Hirowatari discovered that A. nobilis was not present in Japan, and the specimens, found on the islands of Honshu, Shikoku, and Kyushu were distinct. He named the new species A. praepilosa, and named two other Japanese species: A. luteocilis and A. luminaris.
