= Phyllonorycter zelkovae =

Scientific classification
- Kingdom: Animalia
- Phylum: Arthropoda
- Class: Insecta
- Order: Lepidoptera
- Family: Gracillariidae
- Genus: Phyllonorycter
- Species: P. zelkovae

Binomial name
- Phyllonorycter zelkovae (Kumata, 1963)

Synonyms
- Lithocolletis zelkovae Kumata, 1963

Species of moth

Phyllonorycter zelkovae is a moth of the family Gracillariidae. It is known from the islands of Honshu and Kyushu in Japan.

The wingspan is 6–7 mm.

The larvae feed as leaf miners on Zelkova serrata.
