= Stigmella castanopsiella =

Scientific classification
- Kingdom: Animalia
- Phylum: Arthropoda
- Class: Insecta
- Order: Lepidoptera
- Family: Nepticulidae
- Genus: Stigmella
- Species: S. castanopsiella

Binomial name
- Stigmella castanopsiella (Kuroko, 1978)

Synonyms
- Nepticula castanopsiella Kuroko, 1978

Species of moth

Stigmella castanopsiella is a moth of the family Nepticulidae. It is only known from Honshū and Kyushu in Japan, but is probably also present in China.

Adults are on wing in March. There is probably one generation per year.

The larvae feed on Castanopsis cuspidata var. sieboldii. They mine the leaves of their host plant.
