= Caloptilia obliquatella =

Scientific classification
- Domain: Eukaryota
- Kingdom: Animalia
- Phylum: Arthropoda
- Class: Insecta
- Order: Lepidoptera
- Family: Gracillariidae
- Genus: Caloptilia
- Species: C. obliquatella

Binomial name
- Caloptilia obliquatella (Matsumura, 1931)

Synonyms
- Gracillaria obliquatella Matsumura, 1931; Povolnya obliquatella (Matsumura, 1931)

Species of moth

Caloptilia obliquatella or Povolnya obliquatella is a moth of the family Gracillariidae. It is known from Japan (Honshū) and Korea.

The wingspan is 11–13 mm. The larvae feed on Quercus species, including Quercus acutissima. They mine the leaves of their host plant during early instars and roll the leaves during late instars.
