= Phyllonorycter jezoniella =

Scientific classification
- Kingdom: Animalia
- Phylum: Arthropoda
- Clade: Pancrustacea
- Class: Insecta
- Order: Lepidoptera
- Family: Gracillariidae
- Genus: Phyllonorycter
- Species: P. jezoniella

Binomial name
- Phyllonorycter jezoniella (Matsumura, 1931)

Synonyms
- Lithocolletis jezoniella Matsumura, 1931

Species of moth

Phyllonorycter jezoniella is a moth of the family Gracillariidae. It is known from Japan (the islands of Hokkaido and Honshu) and the Russian Far East.

The larvae feed on Acer mono. They mine the leaves of their host plant.
