= Caloptilia ulmi =

Scientific classification
- Kingdom: Animalia
- Phylum: Arthropoda
- Class: Insecta
- Order: Lepidoptera
- Family: Gracillariidae
- Genus: Caloptilia
- Species: C. ulmi

Binomial name
- Caloptilia ulmi Kumata, 1982

Synonyms
- Caloptilia ulmiella Ermolaev, 1984

Species of moth

Caloptilia ulmi is a moth of the family Gracillariidae. It is known from China, Japan (Honshū, Hokkaidō) and the Russian Far East.

The wingspan is 11–14 mm.

The larvae feed on Ulmus davidiana, Ulmus japonica, Ulmus laciniata and Zelkova serrata. They mine the leaves of their host plant.
