= Stigmella aladina =

Scientific classification
- Kingdom: Animalia
- Phylum: Arthropoda
- Class: Insecta
- Order: Lepidoptera
- Family: Nepticulidae
- Genus: Stigmella
- Species: S. aladina

Binomial name
- Stigmella aladina Puplesis, 1984

Synonyms
- Stigmella quercifaga Kemperman & Wilkinson, 1985

Species of moth

Stigmella aladina is a moth of the family Nepticulidae. It is found in Russia (Primorskiy Kray), China (Heilongjiang) and Japan (Honshu, Kyushu).

The wingspan is 4.6-5.7 mm. There are two generations per year. Adults are on wing in July and August and again in spring, although this second generation is only known from reared specimens.

The larvae feed on Quercus mongolica and Quercus serrata and Quercus acutissima in Japan. They mine the leaves of their host plant.
