= Phyllonorycter yakusimensis =

Scientific classification
- Kingdom: Animalia
- Phylum: Arthropoda
- Class: Insecta
- Order: Lepidoptera
- Family: Gracillariidae
- Genus: Phyllonorycter
- Species: P. yakusimensis

Binomial name
- Phyllonorycter yakusimensis (Kumata, 1967)

Synonyms
- Lithocolletis yakusimensis Kumata, 1967

Species of moth

Phyllonorycter yakusimensis is a moth of the family Gracillariidae. It is known from the island of Kyūshū in Japan.

The wingspan is 9-9.5 mm.

The larvae feed on Rhododendron tashiroi. They mine the leaves of their host plant.
