= Glyphipterix imparfasciata =

Scientific classification
- Kingdom: Animalia
- Phylum: Arthropoda
- Clade: Pancrustacea
- Class: Insecta
- Order: Lepidoptera
- Family: Glyphipterigidae
- Genus: Glyphipterix
- Species: G. imparfasciata

Binomial name
- Glyphipterix imparfasciata Arita, 1979

Species of moth

Glyphipterix imparfasciata is a species of sedge moths in the genus Glyphipterix. It was described by Yutaka Arita in 1979. It is found in Japan.

The wingspan is about 10 mm.
