= Glyphipterix gaudialis =

Scientific classification
- Kingdom: Animalia
- Phylum: Arthropoda
- Clade: Pancrustacea
- Class: Insecta
- Order: Lepidoptera
- Family: Glyphipterigidae
- Genus: Glyphipterix
- Species: G. gaudialis

Binomial name
- Glyphipterix gaudialis Diakonoff, 1976

Species of moth

Glyphipterix gaudialis is a species of sedge moth in the genus Glyphipterix. It was described by Alexey Diakonoff in 1976. It is found in Japan.

The wingspan is 11–14 mm.
