= Stigmella oa =

Scientific classification
- Kingdom: Animalia
- Phylum: Arthropoda
- Clade: Pancrustacea
- Class: Insecta
- Order: Lepidoptera
- Family: Nepticulidae
- Genus: Stigmella
- Species: S. oa

Binomial name
- Stigmella oa Kemperman & Wilkinson, 1985

Species of moth

Stigmella oa is a moth of the family Nepticulidae. It is only known from Honshu in Japan.
