= Stigmella egonokii =

Scientific classification
- Kingdom: Animalia
- Phylum: Arthropoda
- Clade: Pancrustacea
- Class: Insecta
- Order: Lepidoptera
- Family: Nepticulidae
- Genus: Stigmella
- Species: S. egonokii

Binomial name
- Stigmella egonokii Kemperman & Wilkinson, 1985

Species of moth

Stigmella egonokii is a moth of the family Nepticulidae. It is only known from Kyushu in Japan.

Adults of the first generation are on wing from the end of April. Second-generation larvae appear in late June, the third-generation larvae in late September to late October. There are two to three generations per year.

The larvae feed on Styrax japonica. They mine the leaves of their host plant.
