= Phyllonorycter bifurcata =

Scientific classification
- Kingdom: Animalia
- Phylum: Arthropoda
- Class: Insecta
- Order: Lepidoptera
- Family: Gracillariidae
- Genus: Phyllonorycter
- Species: P. bifurcata

Binomial name
- Phyllonorycter bifurcata (Kumata, 1967)

Synonyms
- Lithocolletis bifurcata Kumata, 1967

Species of moth

Phyllonorycter bifurcata is a moth of the family Gracillariidae. It is known from the islands of Kyūshū, Shikoku and Tusima in Japan.

The wingspan is about 5.5 mm.

The larvae feed on Celtis jessoensis and Celtis sinensis. They mine the leaves of their host plant.
