= Stigmella acrochaetia =

Scientific classification
- Kingdom: Animalia
- Phylum: Arthropoda
- Clade: Pancrustacea
- Class: Insecta
- Order: Lepidoptera
- Family: Nepticulidae
- Genus: Stigmella
- Species: S. acrochaetia

Binomial name
- Stigmella acrochaetia Kemperman & Wilkinson, 1985

Species of moth

Stigmella acrochaetia is a moth of the family Nepticulidae. It is only known from Hokkaido in Japan.
