= Phyllonorycter tenebriosa =

Scientific classification
- Kingdom: Animalia
- Phylum: Arthropoda
- Class: Insecta
- Order: Lepidoptera
- Family: Gracillariidae
- Genus: Phyllonorycter
- Species: P. tenebriosa

Binomial name
- Phyllonorycter tenebriosa (Kumata, 1967)

Synonyms
- Lithocolletis tenebriosa Kumata, 1967

Species of moth

Phyllonorycter tenebriosa is a moth of the family Gracillariidae. It is known from the island of Honshū in Japan.

The wingspan is 6-6.5 mm.

The larvae feed on Corylus heterophylla. They probably mine the leaves of their host plant.
