= Glyphipterix trigonodes =

Scientific classification
- Kingdom: Animalia
- Phylum: Arthropoda
- Clade: Pancrustacea
- Class: Insecta
- Order: Lepidoptera
- Family: Glyphipterigidae
- Genus: Glyphipterix
- Species: G. trigonodes

Binomial name
- Glyphipterix trigonodes Arita, 1979

Species of moth

Glyphipterix trigonodes is a species of sedge moth in the genus Glyphipterix. It was described by Yutaka Arita in 1979. It is found on the Ryukyu Islands and in Taiwan.

The wingspan is 8–10 mm.
