= Stigmella fumida =

Scientific classification
- Kingdom: Animalia
- Phylum: Arthropoda
- Clade: Pancrustacea
- Class: Insecta
- Order: Lepidoptera
- Family: Nepticulidae
- Genus: Stigmella
- Species: S. fumida

Binomial name
- Stigmella fumida Kemperman & Wilkinson, 1985

Synonyms
- Stigmella chrysopterella Kemperman & Wilkinson, 1985; Stigmella kurii Kemperman & Wilkinson, 1985

Species of moth

Stigmella fumida is a moth of the family Nepticulidae. It is found in Japan (Tsushima, possibly Kyushu), North Korea and China (Yunnan).

The wingspan is 5.2-6.1 mm. Larvae have been found in October and adults were reared from February to May, one adult was collected in July in Korea. There are probably at least two generations per year.

The larvae feed on Quercus acutissima, Quercus variabilis and possibly also on Castanea crenata. They mine the leaves of their host plant.
