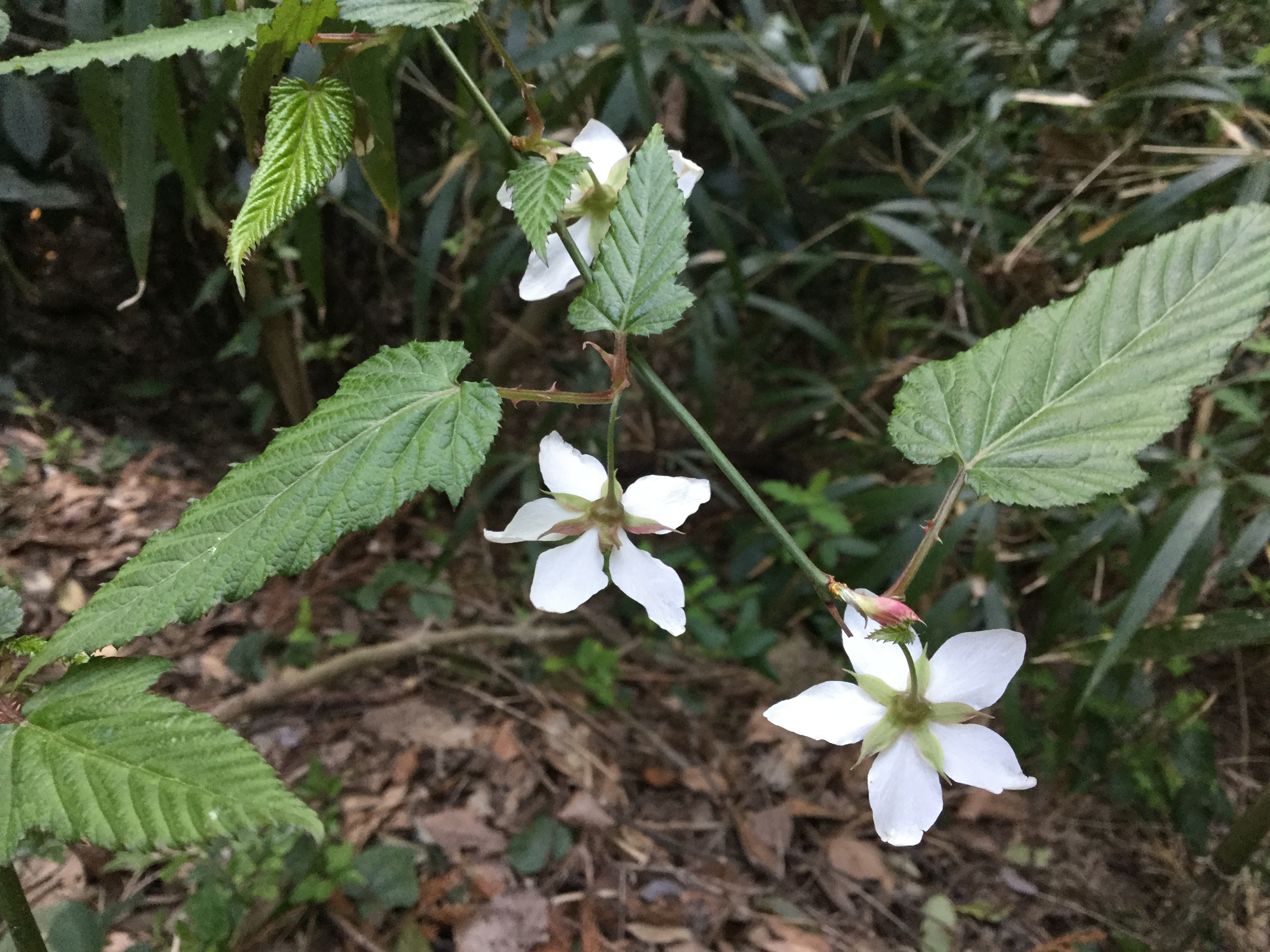

Scientific classification
- Kingdom: Plantae
- Clade: Tracheophytes
- Clade: Angiosperms
- Clade: Eudicots
- Clade: Rosids
- Order: Rosales
- Family: Rosaceae
- Genus: Rubus
- Subgenus: Rubus subg. Idaeobatus
- Species: R. palmatus

Binomial name
- Rubus palmatus Thunb. (1784)

Synonyms
- List: Rubus yakumontanus Masamune; Rubus tanakae Kuntze; Rubus sohayakiensis Koidz.; Rubus similis Kuntze; Rubus palmatus yakumontanus (Masam.) Hatusima ex H. Ohba; Rubus palmatus coptophyllus (A. Gray) Kuntze; Rubus palmatus inerme K. Ide; Rubus palmatus coronarius H. Ohba; Rubus palmatoides Kuntze; Rubus omogoensis Koidz.; Rubus horiyoshitakae Koidz.; Rubus fauriei Lév. & Vaniot; Rubus edulis Koidz.; Rubus dulcis Koidz.; Rubus coptophyllus A. Gray; Rubus palmata Greene

= Rubus palmatus =

Species of plant

Rubus palmatus, also known as mayberry, is an ornamental bramble that has white flowers and yellow edible fruits that ripen in May. It is native to Korea and Japan.
