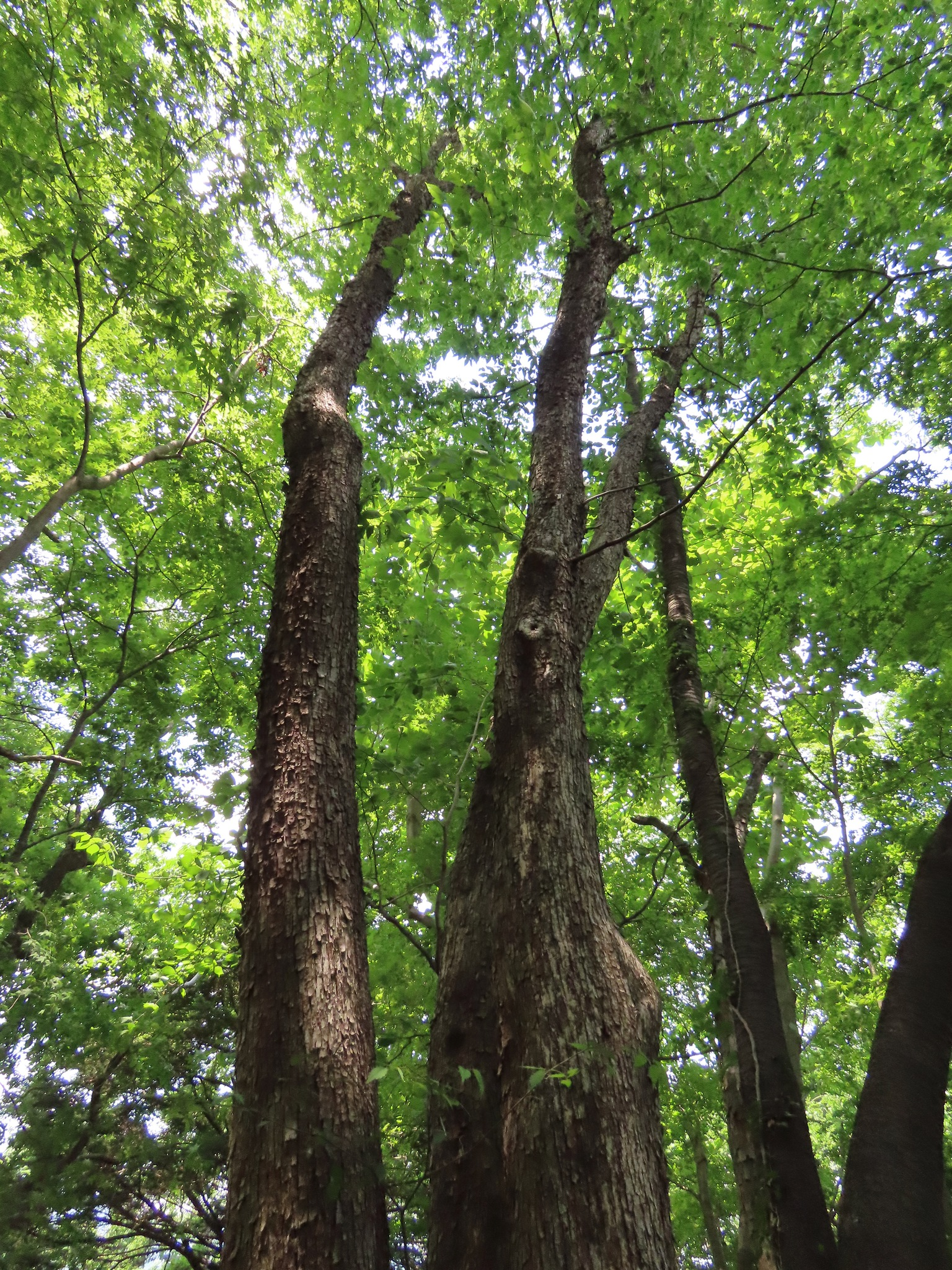

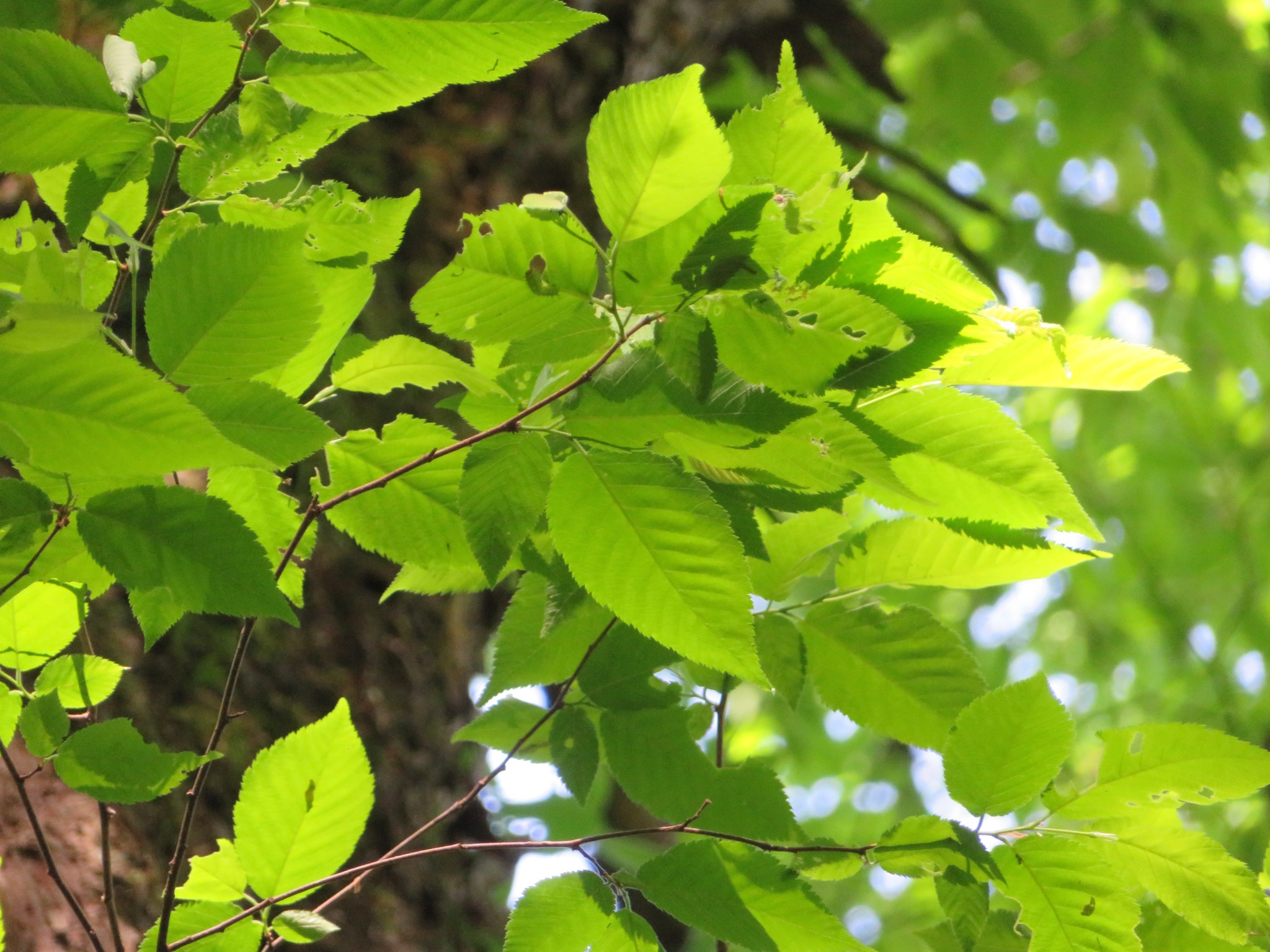

Conservation status
- Least Concern (IUCN 3.1)

Scientific classification
- Kingdom: Plantae
- Clade: Embryophytes
- Clade: Tracheophytes
- Clade: Angiosperms
- Clade: Eudicots
- Clade: Rosids
- Order: Fagales
- Family: Betulaceae
- Genus: Ostrya
- Species: O. japonica

Binomial name
- Ostrya japonica Sarg.

Synonyms
- Ostrya japonica var. homochaeta Honda; Ostrya liana Hu; Ostrya ostrya var. japonica (Sarg.) C.K.Schneid., not validly publ.; Ostrya virginica var. japonica Maxim. ex Sarg., not validly publ.

= Ostrya japonica =

Species of tree

Ostrya japonica, known as East Asian hophornbeam, or Japanese hop-hornbeam, is a species of tree in the Betulaceae family growing to 25 m tall. It is native to Japan, Korea and China. In China, it grows in temperate forests of southern Gansu, Hebei, Henan, Hubei, and Shaanxi provinces from 1,000–2,800 metres (3,300–9,200 ft) elevation. In Japan it is known as Asada (浅田).
