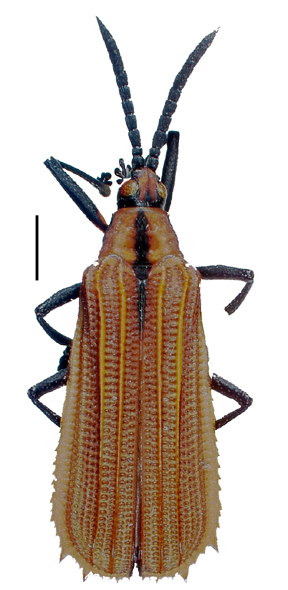
- Oxychalepus normalis by C.L. Staines

Scientific classification
- Kingdom: Animalia
- Phylum: Arthropoda
- Clade: Pancrustacea
- Class: Insecta
- Order: Coleoptera
- Suborder: Polyphaga
- Infraorder: Cucujiformia
- Family: Chrysomelidae
- Subfamily: Cassidinae
- Tribe: Chalepini
- Genus: Oxychalepus; Uhmann, 1937

= Oxychalepus =

Genus of leaf beetles

Oxychalepus is a genus of beetles belonging to the family Chrysomelidae.

== Species ==
Species	Described by	Habitats	Length (adults)	Appearance	Notes
Oxychalepus alienus	Baly, 1885	Colombia, Costa Rica, El Salvador, Honduras, Mexico, Nicaragua, Panama and Venezuela	7.6–9 mm	Yellowish, with a black head, antennae and legs; both the pronotum and elytron have black markings	They have been recorded feeding on Centrosema macrocarpum and Cassia fruticosa.
Oxychalepus anchora	Chapuis, 1877	Argentina, Bolivia, Brazil, Colombia, Costa Rica, Ecuador, El Salvador, Guatemala, Honduras, Mexico, Nicaragua, Panama, Paraguay, Peru, Trinidad and Venezuela	7.4–9.2 mm	Black head and antennae, while the pronotum is yellow with a medial black band and two black lateral bands; the elytron is orangish-yellow with a black anchor-like marking	They have been recorded feeding on Canavalia ensiformis, Canavalia spontanea, Cymbosema species, as well as Solanum auriculatum, Calopogonium mucunoides, Phaseolus vulgaris, Phaseolus lunatus, Glycine max and Mucuna mutesiana.
Oxychalepus angulatus	Staines, 2010	Argentina and Bolivia	10.9–11.1 mm	Black head, antennae and legs, while the pronotum and elytron are orangish-yellow with black markings	The species name is derived from Latin angulus (meaning corner or angle) and refers to the distinctly angulate lateral margin of the pronotum.
Oxychalepus balyanus	Weise, 1911	Belize, Colombia, Costa Rica, El Salvador, Guatemala, Honduras, Mexico (Baja California, Guerrero, Morelos, Jalisco, Tabasco, Tamaulipas, Veracruz, Quintana Roo) and Nicaragua	6.3–8.7 mm	Black head, antennae and legs, while the pronotum and elytron are orangish-yellow with black markings	They have been recorded feeding on Centrosema pubescens, Desmodium species, as well as Dioclea megacarpa.
Oxychalepus bisignatus	Chapuis, 1877	Argentina, Bolivia, Brazil and Ecuador	6–8.6 mm	Black head and legs; the pronotum has a spot on the anterior margin and two reddish triangular markings; the elytron is black with two yellow bands, united by a discal band	
Oxychalepus centralis	Uhmann, 1940	Bolivia, Brazil and Paraguay	7–9 mm	They have a black head, while the pronotum is orange with a large black medial spot. The elytron is orange with the apical one-fourth black and an anchor-like marking	
Oxychalepus elongatus	Chapuis, 1877	Brazil (Bahia), Paraguay and Venezuela	9.5–10.4 mm	They have a black head, while the pronotum is orange with three black vittae. The elytron is orange with the apical one-fourth black and a black sutural vitta and spot	
Oxychalepus externus	Chapuis, 1877	Argentina, Bolivia, Brazil (Rio de Janeiro, São Paulo), Colombia, French Guiana, Paraguay, Peru, Suriname and Venezuela	6.1–9.6 mm	They have a black head and antennae, while the pronotum is yellow, with a black medial band and two black lateral bands. The elytron is black, with a yellow oval spot and a yellow postmedial band	They have been recorded feeding on Inga affinis, Solanum auriculatum, Canavalia ensiformis, Canavalia spontanea, as well as Dioclea, Cimbosema and Phaseolus species.
Oxychalepus insignitus	Chapuis, 1877	Brazil (São Paulo)	10.1–10.4 mm	Adults are reddish-yellow with a black head, antennae and legs; the pronotum and elytron both have black markings	
Oxychalepus normalis	Chapuis, 1877	Brazil, Costa Rica, Mexico, Panama and Venezuela	8.7–10.5 mm	Adults are yellowish-red with a black head and antennae; the lateral margins of the pronotum are black and the elytron is yellowish-red with the suture at the base darker	The foodplant is unknown, but adults have been collected on Cassia species.
Oxychalepus opacicollis	Ramos, 1998	Brazil (Amazonas), Ecuador, Peru and Trinidad	6.5–8.3 mm	Orangish pronotum with a black medial stripe and lateral margins; the apical one-fourth of the elytron is black and there are anchor-shaped black markings in the basal area	
Oxychalepus paranormalis	Ramos, 1998	Brazil	9.1–10.4 mm	Orangish pronotum with one medial and two lateral black stripes; the apical one-fourth of the elytron is black and there is an anchor-shaped black marking in the basal area	
Oxychalepus posticatus	Baly, 1885	Brazil, Costa Rica, Nicaragua and Panama	10–11.6 mm	Black antennae and legs; head is also black, but with an orangish spot; the pronotum is orangish with a black medial vitta and the elytron is orangish with basal black sutural vitta; the apical one-fourth is also black	They have been recorded feeding on Cassia oxyphylla, Cassia hayesiana and Cassia fruticosa.
Oxychalepus proximus	Guérin-Méneville, 1844	Bolivia, Brazil and Paraguay	8–10 mm	Black head, antennae and legs; the pronotum is yellowish with three black stripes and the elytron has a black anchor-shaped marking	
Oxychalepus trispinosis	Pic, 1931	French Guiana	7 mm	Black head and antennae; pronotum and elytron are orangish	The placement of this species in the genus Oxychalepus is uncertain.
