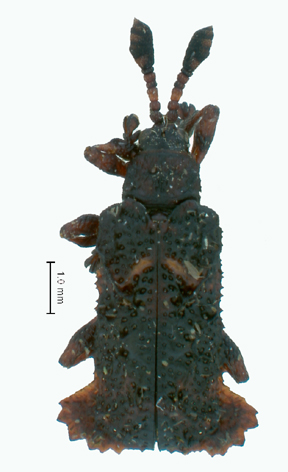

Scientific classification
- Kingdom: Animalia
- Phylum: Arthropoda
- Clade: Pancrustacea
- Class: Insecta
- Order: Coleoptera
- Suborder: Polyphaga
- Infraorder: Cucujiformia
- Family: Chrysomelidae
- Genus: Physocoryna
- Species: P. scabra

Binomial name
- Physocoryna scabra Guérin-Méneville, 1844

Synonyms
- Octotoma tessellata Maulik, 1929

= Physocoryna scabra =

Species of beetle

Physocoryna scabra is a species of beetle of the family Chrysomelidae. It is found in Argentina, Brazil (Bahia, Goyaz, Matto Grosso, São Paulo), Colombia, Peru and Paraguay.

== Description ==
Adults reach a length of about 4-5.5 mm. Adults are either yellow-castaneous with blackish markings or entirely reddish-brown.

== Biology ==
The recorded food plants are Canavalia species (including Canavalia ensiformis), as well as Cymbosema, Dioclea, Phaseolus and Stimatophyllum species.
