= Oxychalepus anchora =

Scientific classification
- Kingdom: Animalia
- Phylum: Arthropoda
- Clade: Pancrustacea
- Class: Insecta
- Order: Coleoptera
- Suborder: Polyphaga
- Infraorder: Cucujiformia
- Family: Chrysomelidae
- Genus: Oxychalepus
- Species: O. anchora

Binomial name
- Oxychalepus anchora (Chapuis, 1877)

Synonyms
- Odontota anchora Chapuis, 1877

Species of beetle

Oxychalepus anchora is a species of beetle of the family Chrysomelidae. It is found in Argentina, Bolivia, Brazil (Amazonas, Bahia, Espiríto Santo, Goiás, Mato Grosso, Mato Grosso do Sul, Minas Gerais, Pará, Paraíba, Pernambuco, Rio de Janeiro, Rio Grande do Sul, Rondônia, Santa Catarina, São Paulo), Colombia, Costa Rica, Ecuador, El Salvador, Guatemala, Honduras, Mexico, Nicaragua, Panama, Paraguay, Peru, Trinidad and Venezuela.

== Description ==
Adults reach a length of about 7.4–9.2 mm. They have a black head and antennae, while the pronotum is yellow with a medial black band and two black lateral bands. The elytron is orangish-yellow with a black anchor-like marking.

== Biology ==
They have been recorded feeding on Canavalia ensiformis, Canavalia spontanea, Cymbosema species, as well as Solanum auriculatum, Calopogonium mucunoides, Phaseolus vulgaris, Phaseolus lunatus, Glycine max and Mucuna mutesiana.
