= Coleophora duplicis =

Scientific classification
- Kingdom: Animalia
- Phylum: Arthropoda
- Class: Insecta
- Order: Lepidoptera
- Family: Coleophoridae
- Genus: Coleophora
- Species: C. duplicis

Binomial name
- Coleophora duplicis Braun, 1921

Species of moth

Coleophora duplicis is a moth of the family Coleophoridae. It is found in North America, including Ohio, British Columbia, Nova Scotia and Ontario.

The larvae feed on the seeds of Aster shortii and Solidago caesia. They create a trivalved, tubular silken case.
