= Oxychalepus externus =

Scientific classification
- Kingdom: Animalia
- Phylum: Arthropoda
- Clade: Pancrustacea
- Class: Insecta
- Order: Coleoptera
- Suborder: Polyphaga
- Infraorder: Cucujiformia
- Family: Chrysomelidae
- Genus: Oxychalepus
- Species: O. externus

Binomial name
- Oxychalepus externus (Chapuis, 1877)

Synonyms
- Odontota externa Chapuis, 1877; Xenochalepus confinis Weise, 1911; Chalepus (Xenochalepus) confinis boliviaca Weise, 1911; Odontota ventralis Chapuis, 1877

Species of beetle

Oxychalepus externus is a species of beetle of the family Chrysomelidae. It is found in Argentina, Bolivia, Brazil (Rio de Janeiro, São Paulo), Colombia, French Guiana, Paraguay, Peru, Suriname and Venezuela.

== Description ==
Adults reach a length of about 6.1–9.6 mm. They have a black head and antennae, while the pronotum is yellow, with a black medial band and two black lateral bands. The elytron is black, with a yellow oval spot and a yellow postmedial band.

== Biology ==
They have been recorded feeding on Inga affinis, Solanum auriculatum, Canavalia ensiformis, Canavalia spontanea, as well as Dioclea, Cimbosema and Phaseolus species.
