= Neolithocolletis kangarensis =

Scientific classification
- Kingdom: Animalia
- Phylum: Arthropoda
- Class: Insecta
- Order: Lepidoptera
- Family: Gracillariidae
- Genus: Neolithocolletis
- Species: N. kangarensis

Binomial name
- Neolithocolletis kangarensis Kumata, 1993

Species of moth

Neolithocolletis kangarensis is a moth of the family Gracillariidae. It is known from Perlis, Malaysia.

The wingspan is 4.2-4.5 mm.

The larvae feed on Calopogonium species. They mine the leaves of their host plant. The mine has the form of an oblong blotch-mine occurring on the disc between two lateral veins of the lower side of the leaf. It is whitish and flat at the immature stage. At maturity, it is discoloured into ochreous, usually distally, by the consumption of leaf-tissue. Then the distal margin of this part is cut out semicircularly, finally the cut part is folded down to cover a circular, white cocoon, which is placed inside the mine-cavity.
