= Bionia =

Scientific classification
- Kingdom: Plantae
- Clade: Tracheophytes
- Clade: Angiosperms
- Clade: Eudicots
- Clade: Rosids
- Order: Fabales
- Family: Fabaceae
- Subfamily: Faboideae
- Clade: Non-protein amino acid-accumulating clade
- Clade: Millettioids
- Tribe: Diocleae
- Genus: Bionia; Mart. ex Benth.

Species
- See text

Genus of Fabaceae plants

Bionia is a small genus of flowering plants in the family Fabaceae, subfamily Faboideae, native to central and eastern Brazil. It was resurrected from Camptosema.

== Species ==
The following species are accepted:

- Bionia coccinea Mart. ex Benth.
- Bionia coriacea (Nees) Benth.
- Bionia pedicellata (Benth.) L.P.Queiroz
- Bionia tomentosa (Benth.) L.P.Queiroz
