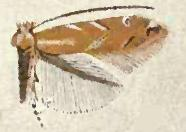

Scientific classification
- Kingdom: Animalia
- Phylum: Arthropoda
- Clade: Pancrustacea
- Class: Insecta
- Order: Lepidoptera
- Family: Gracillariidae
- Genus: Cremastobombycia
- Species: C. solidaginis

Binomial name
- Cremastobombycia solidaginis (Frey & Boll, 1876)

Synonyms
- Lithocolletis solidaginis Frey & Boll, 1876; Cremastobombycia solidaginia Ely, 1918; Cremastobombycia solidaginisella (Chambers, 1880)

= Cremastobombycia solidaginis =

Species of moth

Cremastobombycia solidaginis is a moth of the family Gracillariidae. It is known from Ontario and Quebec in Canada, and Florida, Texas, Georgia, Kentucky, Maine, Maryland, Massachusetts, Connecticut and Michigan in the United States.

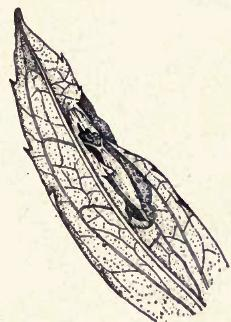
Mine and cocoon

The wingspan is 7–9 mm.

The larvae feed on Baccharis pilularis and Solidago species, including Solidago altissima, Solidago bicolor, Solidago caesia, Solidago canadensis, Solidago fistulosa, Solidago gigantea, Solidago patula and Solidago rugosa.
