= Solidago lateriflora =

Solidago lateriflora may refer to:

- A basionym, when written Solidago lateriflora L., for Symphyotrichum lateriflorum
- A synonym, when written Solidago lateriflora Raf. ex DC., for Solidago caesia
