= Oxychalepus balyanus =

Scientific classification
- Kingdom: Animalia
- Phylum: Arthropoda
- Class: Insecta
- Order: Coleoptera
- Suborder: Polyphaga
- Infraorder: Cucujiformia
- Family: Chrysomelidae
- Genus: Oxychalepus
- Species: O. balyanus

Binomial name
- Oxychalepus balyanus (Weise, 1911)

Synonyms
- Chalepus acuticornis Baly, 1885 (preocc.); Chalepus (Xenochalepus) balyanus Weise, 1911

Species of beetle

Oxychalepus balyanus is a species of beetle of the family Chrysomelidae. It is found in Belize, Colombia, Costa Rica, El Salvador, Guatemala, Honduras, Mexico (Baja California, Guerrero, Morelos, Jalisco, Tabasco, Tamaulipas, Veracruz, Quintana Roo) and Nicaragua.

== Description ==
Adults reach a length of about 6.3–8.7 mm. They have a black head, antennae and legs, while the pronotum and elytron are orangish-yellow with black markings.

== Biology ==
They have been recorded feeding on Centrosema pubescens, Desmodium species, as well as Dioclea megacarpa.
