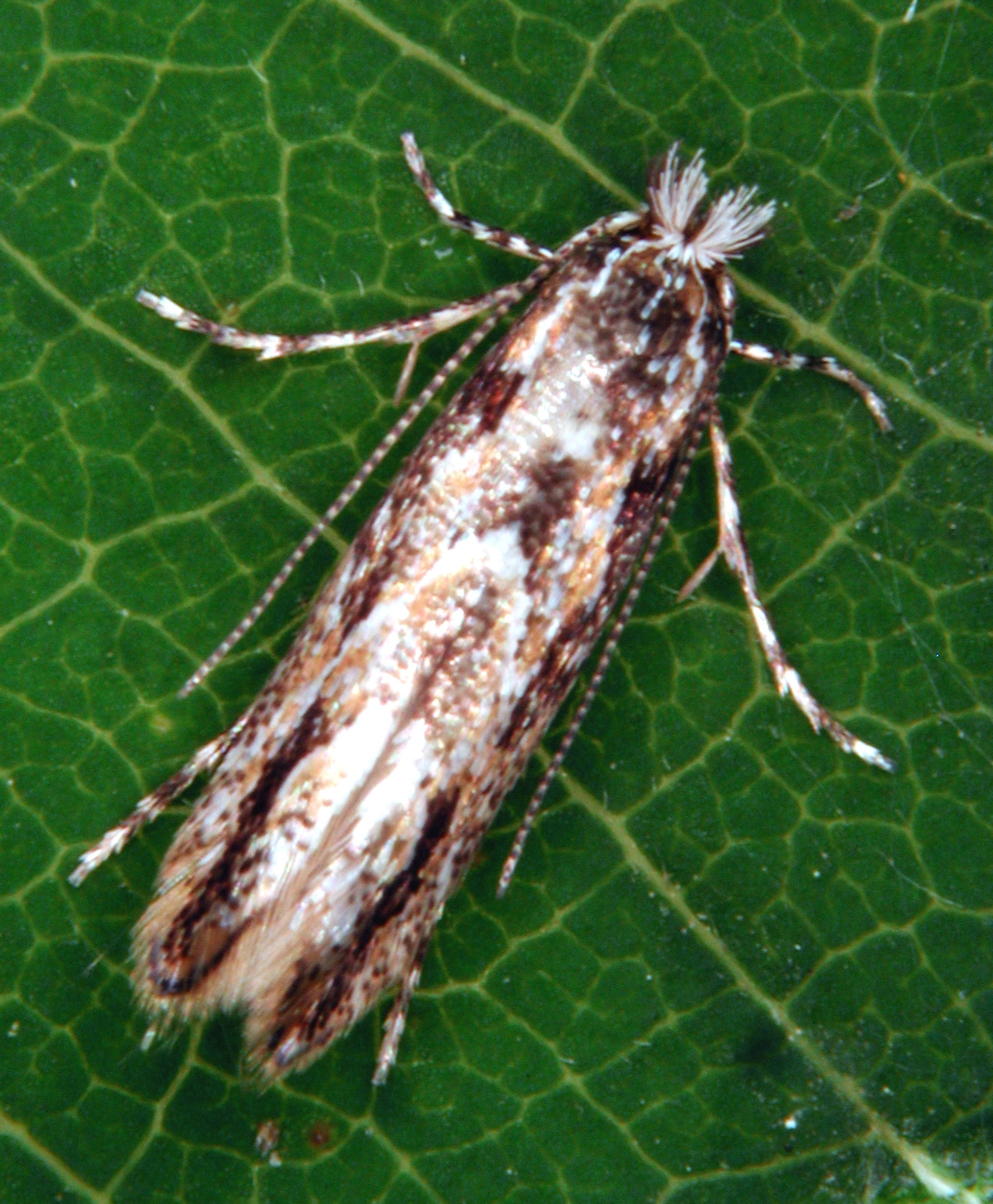
- Phyllonorycter issikii

Scientific classification
- Kingdom: Animalia
- Phylum: Arthropoda
- Clade: Pancrustacea
- Class: Insecta
- Order: Lepidoptera
- Family: Gracillariidae
- Subfamily: Lithocolletinae; Stainton, 1854

Genera
- 11

= Lithocolletinae =

Subfamily of moths

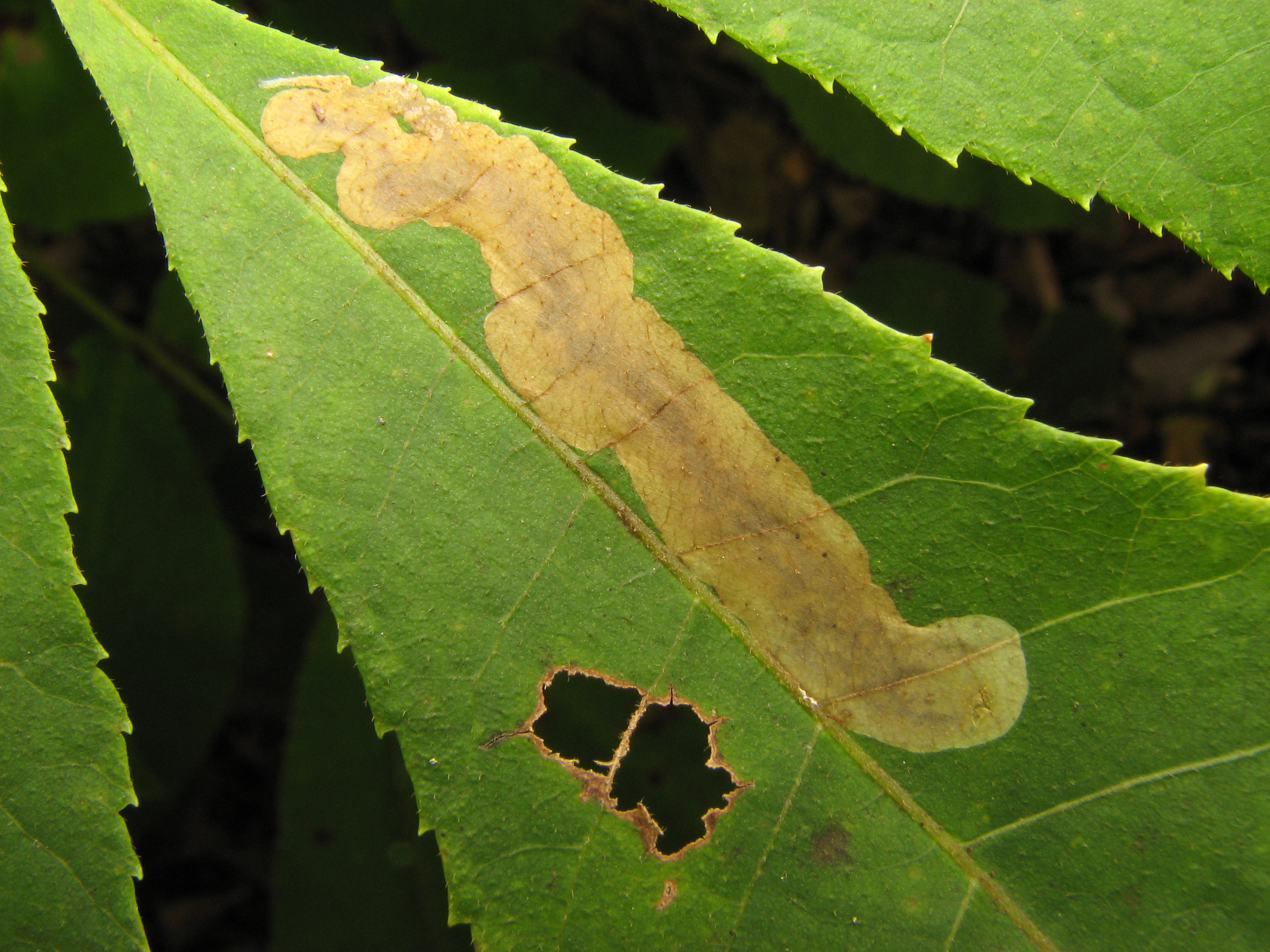
Leaf mine on hickory made by Cameraria caryaefoliella

Lithocolletinae is a subfamily of insects in the moth family Gracillariidae. It is distributed worldwide, with most species in temperate regions.

== Diversity and distribution ==
As of 2012, the subfamily contains over 540 species divided into ten genera. About half are native to the Palearctic realm, and over 100 occur in the Nearctic realm. About 66 species occur in the Afrotropical realm, 41 of which were described in the year 2012.

== Description ==
Moths of the subfamily are small, with wingspans under 10 millimeters. They are often colorful, with forewings in shades of orange or red-brown with white or silvery streaks, and a metallic, shiny ground color. Another trait sometimes used to distinguish species is the style of frass distribution. Species may leave their frass scattered about, deposited neatly along leaf veins or gathered at the feeding area, knit into a pile with silk threads, or spun into the cocoon.

== Biology ==
These moths are associated with at least 870 species of host plants in 36 botanical families. Many feed on plants of the legume family, Fabaceae, and five genera are limited to them. Many species are monophagic, known from only one host plant. The larvae of most species are found on legumes, as well as the beech family (Fagaceae), the birch family (Betulaceae), the rose family (Rosaceae), and the willow family (Salicaceae).

Most larvae are leaf miners, which feed on leaves and produce distorting tissue damage. Most larvae suck sap during their first three instars, and consume the leaves during their final two instar stages. Familiar pests in the subfamily include Cameraria ohridella, which feeds on horse chestnut (Aesculus hippocastanum), Phyllonorycter blancardella, which feeds on apples (Malus spp.), Cremastobombycia lantanella, which attacks lantana (Lantana camara). Some larvae produce galls on plants.

== Genera ==
There are 11 genera. The largest, Phyllonorycter, contains around 400 species, while the smallest, Protolithocolletis, has only one species. Phyllonorycter contains many species of unclear phylogenetic origins and uncertain taxonomic classification. The definitions of the genera are not yet fully developed. Molecular analysis is ongoing. Collection of specimens is continuing, and new genera are being observed and will be described in the future.

Genera:

- Cameraria Chapman, 1902
- Chrysaster Kumata, 1961
- Cremastobombycia Braun, 1908
- Hyloconis Kumata, 1963
- Leucanthiza Clemens, 1859
- Macrosaccus Davis and De Prins, 2011
- Neolithocolletis Kumata, 1963
- Phyllonorycter Hübner, 1822
- Porphyrosela Braun, 1908
- Protolithocolletis Braun, 1929
- Triberta De Prins et al., 2013
