= Dioclea guianensis =

Scientific classification
- Kingdom: Plantae
- Clade: Tracheophytes
- Clade: Angiosperms
- Clade: Eudicots
- Clade: Rosids
- Order: Fabales
- Family: Fabaceae
- Subfamily: Faboideae
- Genus: Dioclea
- Species: D. guianensis

Binomial name
- Dioclea guianensis Benth.

Species of legume

Dioclea guianensis is a species of legume native to the Americas.
