= Hyloconis lespedezae =

Scientific classification
- Kingdom: Animalia
- Phylum: Arthropoda
- Class: Insecta
- Order: Lepidoptera
- Family: Gracillariidae
- Genus: Hyloconis
- Species: H. lespedezae

Binomial name
- Hyloconis lespedezae Kumata, 1963

Species of moth

Hyloconis lespedezae is a moth of the family Gracillariidae. It is known from Japan (the islands of Hokkaido, Honshu and Kyushu), Korea and the Russian Far East.

The wingspan is 6.5–7 mm.

The larvae feed as leaf miners on Lespedeza bicolor.
