= Lackeya =

Scientific classification
- Kingdom: Plantae
- Clade: Tracheophytes
- Clade: Angiosperms
- Clade: Eudicots
- Clade: Rosids
- Order: Fabales
- Family: Fabaceae
- Subfamily: Faboideae
- Tribe: Diocleae
- Genus: Lackeya; Fortunato, L.P.Queiroz & G.P.Lewis

Genus of flowering plants

Lackeya is a genus of flowering plants in the legume family, Fabaceae. It contains two species native to North America.

The genus name of Lackeya is in honour of James A. Lackey (b. 1943), American botanist at Iowa State University and the Smithsonian Institution and also specialist in Fabaceae and Phaseoleae families of plants. The Latin specific epithet of multiflora means multiple or many flowers. Both the genus and Lackeya multiflora were first described and published in Kew Bull. Vol.51 on pages 365-366 in 1996.

== Species ==
- Lackeya multiflora (Torr. & A.Gray) Fortunato, L.P.Queiroz & G.P.Lewis
- Lackeya viridiflora (Rose) L.P.Queiroz
