= Cratylia bahiensis =

Conservation status
- Vulnerable (IUCN 2.3)

Scientific classification
- Kingdom: Plantae
- Clade: Tracheophytes
- Clade: Angiosperms
- Clade: Eudicots
- Clade: Rosids
- Order: Fabales
- Family: Fabaceae
- Subfamily: Faboideae
- Genus: Cratylia
- Species: C. bahiensis

Binomial name
- Cratylia bahiensis L.P. de Queiroz

Species of legume

Cratylia bahiensis is a species of legume in the family Fabaceae. It is found only in Brazil.
