= Hyloconis wisteriae =

Scientific classification
- Kingdom: Animalia
- Phylum: Arthropoda
- Class: Insecta
- Order: Lepidoptera
- Family: Gracillariidae
- Genus: Hyloconis
- Species: H. wisteriae

Binomial name
- Hyloconis wisteriae Kumata, 1963

Species of moth

Hyloconis wisteriae is a moth of the family Gracillariidae. It is known from the islands of Shikoku and Kyushu in Japan.

The wingspan is 5–6 mm.
