= Hyloconis luminata =

Scientific classification
- Kingdom: Animalia
- Phylum: Arthropoda
- Class: Insecta
- Order: Lepidoptera
- Family: Gracillariidae
- Genus: Hyloconis
- Species: H. luminata

Binomial name
- Hyloconis luminata Bai & Li, 2012

Species of moth

Hyloconis luminata is a moth of the family Gracillariidae. It is found in China (Hebei, Shanxi and Beijing).
