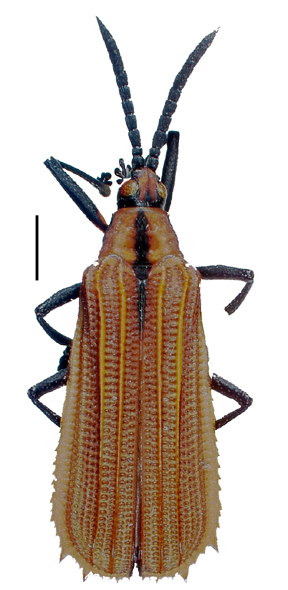

Scientific classification
- Kingdom: Animalia
- Phylum: Arthropoda
- Clade: Pancrustacea
- Class: Insecta
- Order: Coleoptera
- Suborder: Polyphaga
- Infraorder: Cucujiformia
- Family: Chrysomelidae
- Genus: Oxychalepus
- Species: O. normalis

Binomial name
- Oxychalepus normalis (Chapuis, 1877)

Synonyms
- Odontota normalis Chapuis, 1877; Chalepus suspiciosus Baly, 1885

= Oxychalepus normalis =

Species of beetle

Oxychalepus normalis is a species of beetle of the family Chrysomelidae. It is found in Brazil, Costa Rica, Mexico, Panama and Venezuela.

== Description ==
Adults reach a length of about 8.7–10.5 mm. Adults are yellowish-red with a black head and antennae. The lateral margins of the pronotum are black and the elytron is yellowish-red with the suture at the base darker.

== Biology ==
The foodplant is unknown, but adults have been collected on Cassia species.
