= Oxychalepus insignitus =

Scientific classification
- Kingdom: Animalia
- Phylum: Arthropoda
- Class: Insecta
- Order: Coleoptera
- Suborder: Polyphaga
- Infraorder: Cucujiformia
- Family: Chrysomelidae
- Genus: Oxychalepus
- Species: O. insignitus

Binomial name
- Oxychalepus insignitus (Chapuis, 1877)

Synonyms
- Odontota insignita Chapuis, 1877

Species of beetle

Oxychalepus insignitus is a species of beetle of the family Chrysomelidae. It is found in Brazil (São Paulo).

== Description ==
Adults reach a length of about 10.1–10.4 mm. Adults are reddish-yellow with a black head, antennae and legs. The pronotum and elytron both have black markings.
