= Oxychalepus proximus =

Scientific classification
- Kingdom: Animalia
- Phylum: Arthropoda
- Clade: Pancrustacea
- Class: Insecta
- Order: Coleoptera
- Suborder: Polyphaga
- Infraorder: Cucujiformia
- Family: Chrysomelidae
- Genus: Oxychalepus
- Species: O. proximus

Binomial name
- Oxychalepus proximus (Guérin-Méneville, 1844)

Synonyms
- Odontota proxima Guérin-Méneville, 1844; Chalepus (Xenochalepus) proximus biinterrupta Pic, 1932

Species of beetle

Oxychalepus proximus is a species of beetle of the family Chrysomelidae. It is found in Bolivia, Brazil and Paraguay.

== Description ==
Adults reach a length of about 8–10 mm. They have a black head, antennae and legs. The pronotum is yellowish with three black stripes and the elytron has a black anchor-shaped marking.
