= Oxychalepus angulatus =

Scientific classification
- Kingdom: Animalia
- Phylum: Arthropoda
- Class: Insecta
- Order: Coleoptera
- Suborder: Polyphaga
- Infraorder: Cucujiformia
- Family: Chrysomelidae
- Genus: Oxychalepus
- Species: O. angulatus

Binomial name
- Oxychalepus angulatus Staines, 2010

Species of beetle

Oxychalepus angulatus is a species of beetle of the family Chrysomelidae. It is found in Argentina and Bolivia.

== Description ==
Adults reach a length of about 10.9–11.1 mm. They have a black head, antennae and legs, while the pronotum and elytron are orangish-yellow with black markings.

== Etymology ==
The species name is derived from Latin angulus (meaning corner or angle) and refers to the distinctly angulate lateral margin of the pronotum.
