= Oxychalepus trispinosis =

Scientific classification
- Kingdom: Animalia
- Phylum: Arthropoda
- Class: Insecta
- Order: Coleoptera
- Suborder: Polyphaga
- Infraorder: Cucujiformia
- Family: Chrysomelidae
- Genus: Oxychalepus
- Species: O. trispinosis

Binomial name
- Oxychalepus trispinosis (Pic, 1931)

Synonyms
- Chalepus (Xenochalepus) trispinosis Pic, 1931

Species of beetle

Oxychalepus trispinosis is a species of beetle of the family Chrysomelidae. It is found in French Guiana.

== Description ==
Adults reach a length of about 7 mm. They have a black head and antennae, while the pronotum and elytron are orangish.

== Taxonomy ==
The placement of this species in the genus Oxychalepus is uncertain.
