= Physocoryna expansa =

Scientific classification
- Kingdom: Animalia
- Phylum: Arthropoda
- Class: Insecta
- Order: Coleoptera
- Suborder: Polyphaga
- Infraorder: Cucujiformia
- Family: Chrysomelidae
- Genus: Physocoryna
- Species: P. expansa

Binomial name
- Physocoryna expansa Pic, 1925

Species of beetle

Physocoryna expansa is a species of beetle of the family Chrysomelidae. It is found in Costa Rica, French Guiana and Panama.

== Description ==
Adults reach a length of about 6.3–7 mm. Adults are black with reddish-brown markings.

== Biology ==
The recorded food plants are Stigmatophyllum species.
