= Hyloconis luki =

Scientific classification
- Kingdom: Animalia
- Phylum: Arthropoda
- Class: Insecta
- Order: Lepidoptera
- Family: Gracillariidae
- Genus: Hyloconis
- Species: H. luki

Binomial name
- Hyloconis luki de Prins, 2012

Species of moth

Hyloconis luki is a moth of the family Gracillariidae. It is found in the Democratic Republic of Congo. The habitat consists of primary rainforest with an undergrowth of Fabaceae.

The length of the forewings is about 1.55 millimetres (0.061 in).
