= Oxychalepus elongatus =

Scientific classification
- Kingdom: Animalia
- Phylum: Arthropoda
- Class: Insecta
- Order: Coleoptera
- Suborder: Polyphaga
- Infraorder: Cucujiformia
- Family: Chrysomelidae
- Genus: Oxychalepus
- Species: O. elongatus

Binomial name
- Oxychalepus elongatus (Chapuis, 1877)

Synonyms
- Odontota elongata Chapuis, 1877

Species of beetle

Oxychalepus elongatus is a species of beetle of the family Chrysomelidae. It is found in Brazil (Bahia), Paraguay and Venezuela.

== Description ==
Adults reach a length of about 9.5–10.4 mm. They have a black head, while the pronotum is orange with three black vittae. The elytron is orange with the apical one-fourth black and a black sutural vitta and spot.
