= Oxychalepus posticatus =

Scientific classification
- Kingdom: Animalia
- Phylum: Arthropoda
- Class: Insecta
- Order: Coleoptera
- Suborder: Polyphaga
- Infraorder: Cucujiformia
- Family: Chrysomelidae
- Genus: Oxychalepus
- Species: O. posticatus

Binomial name
- Oxychalepus posticatus (Baly, 1885)

Synonyms
- Chalepus posticatus Baly, 1885

Species of beetle

Oxychalepus posticatus is a species of beetle of the family Chrysomelidae. It is found in Brazil, Costa Rica, Nicaragua and Panama.

== Description ==
Adults reach a length of about 10–11.6 mm. They have black antennae and legs. The head is also black, but with an orangish spot. The pronotum is orangish with a black medial vitta and the elytron is orangish with basal black sutural vitta. The apical one-fourth is also black.

== Biology ==
They have been recorded feeding on Cassia oxyphylla, Cassia hayesiana and Cassia fruticosa.
