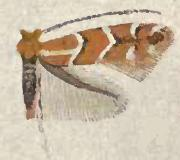

Scientific classification
- Domain: Eukaryota
- Kingdom: Animalia
- Phylum: Arthropoda
- Class: Insecta
- Order: Lepidoptera
- Family: Gracillariidae
- Genus: Cremastobombycia
- Species: C. grindeliella

Binomial name
- Cremastobombycia grindeliella (Walsingham, 1891)

Synonyms
- Lithocolletis grindeliella Walsingham, 1891

= Cremastobombycia grindeliella =

Species of insect

Cremastobombycia grindeliella is a moth of the family Gracillariidae. It is known from California, United States.

The wingspan is about 8 mm.

The larvae feed on Anaphalis margaritacea, Gnaphalium species, Grindelia camporum, Grindelia robusta and Pseudognaphalium stramineum. They mine the leaves of their host plant. The mines occur upon either the upper or lower surface of the leaves. In the upperside mines, the leaf is more contracted and the epidermis is thrown into more distinct folds than is the case in the lower side mines. The elongate white silken cocoon is attached at its posterior end by two fine threads, and at its anterior end by a rather broad band of silk.
