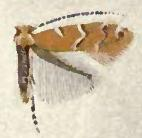

Scientific classification
- Domain: Eukaryota
- Kingdom: Animalia
- Phylum: Arthropoda
- Class: Insecta
- Order: Lepidoptera
- Family: Gracillariidae
- Genus: Cremastobombycia
- Species: C. verbesinella

Binomial name
- Cremastobombycia verbesinella (Busck, 1900)

Synonyms
- Lithocolletis verbesinella Busck, 1900

= Cremastobombycia verbesinella =

Species of moth

Cremastobombycia verbesinella is a moth of the family Gracillariidae. It is known from Florida, United States.

The wingspan is about 6.4 mm.

The larvae feed on Verbesina virginica. They mine the leaves of their host plant.
