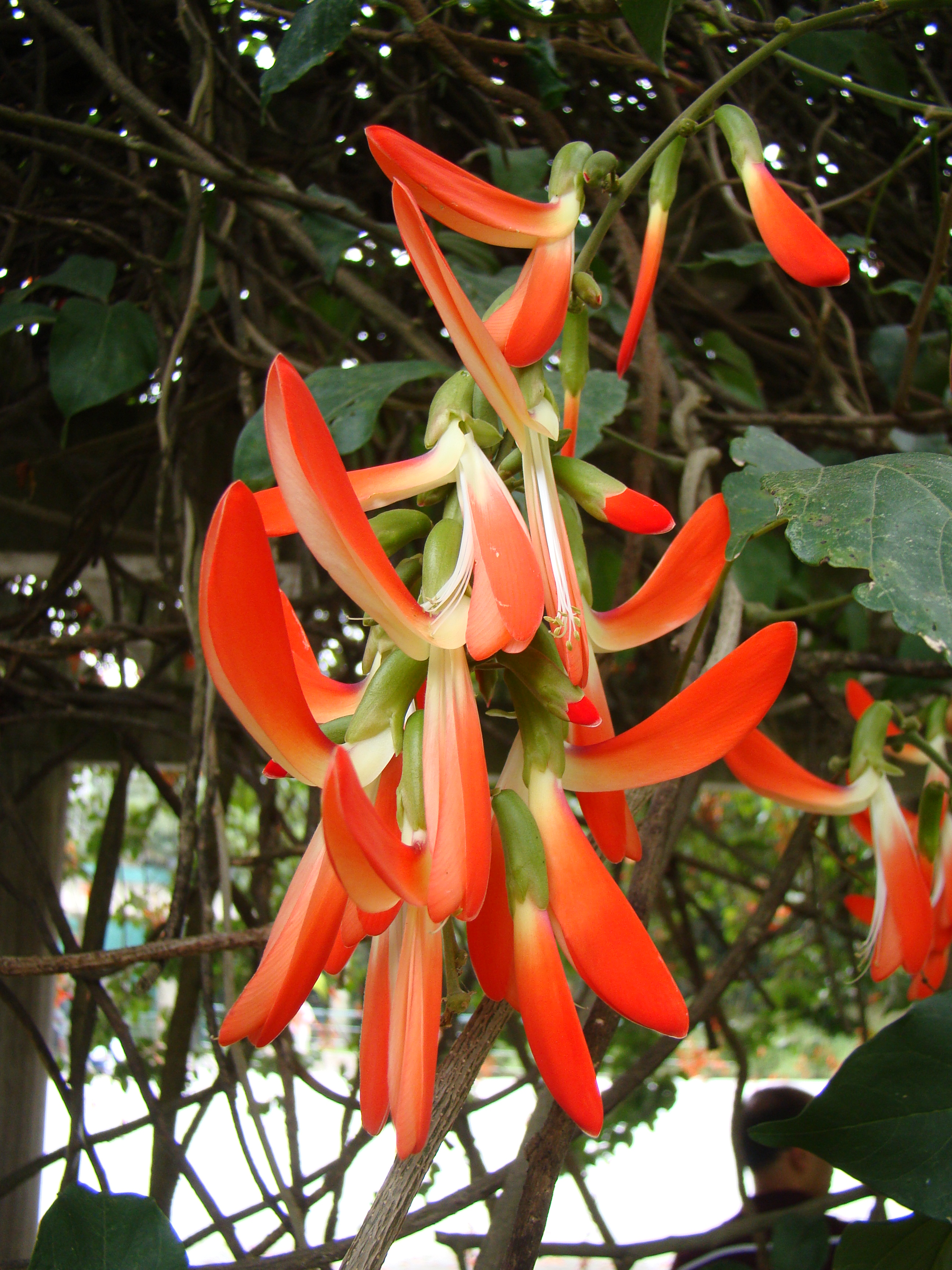
- Camptosema grandiflora

Scientific classification
- Kingdom: Plantae
- Clade: Tracheophytes
- Clade: Angiosperms
- Clade: Eudicots
- Clade: Rosids
- Order: Fabales
- Family: Fabaceae
- Subfamily: Faboideae
- Clade: Meso-Papilionoideae
- Clade: Non-protein amino acid-accumulating clade
- Clade: Millettioids
- Tribe: Diocleae (Benth. 1865) Hutch. 1964

Genera
- See text

Synonyms
- Diocleinae (Benth. 1865) Lackey 1981; Diocleinae (Benth. 1865) Schrire et al. 2005; Diocleinae (Benth. 1865) Taub. 1894; Diocleae Benth. 1865; Galactieae (Benth. 1865) Hutch. 1964; Galactieae Benth. 1865

= Diocleae =

Tribe of legumes

The tribe Diocleae is one of the subdivisions of the plant family Fabaceae.

The Diocleae can be distinguished from other members of Fabaceae by

[A] combination of features involving the woody vine or shrub habit, stipellate trifoliolate leaves, nodose pseudoraceme inflorescence, flowers with a distinct hypanthium, and calyx with lanceolate lobes, the lower lobe longer than the remaining (except in the specialized resupinate flowers of Canavalia).

== Genera ==
Diocleae contains the following genera:

- Canavalia Clade
  - Canavalia Adans.
- Dioclea Clade
  - Cleobulia Mart. ex Benth.
  - Cymbosema Benth.
  - Dioclea Kunth
  - Macropsychanthus Harms ex K. Schum. & Lauterb.
- Galactia Clade
  - Bionia Mart.
  - Camptosema Hook. & Arn.
  - Collaea DC.
  - Cratylia Mart. ex Benth.
  - Galactia P. Browne
  - Lackeya Fortunato et al.
  - Neorudolphia Britton
  - Rhodopis Urb.
