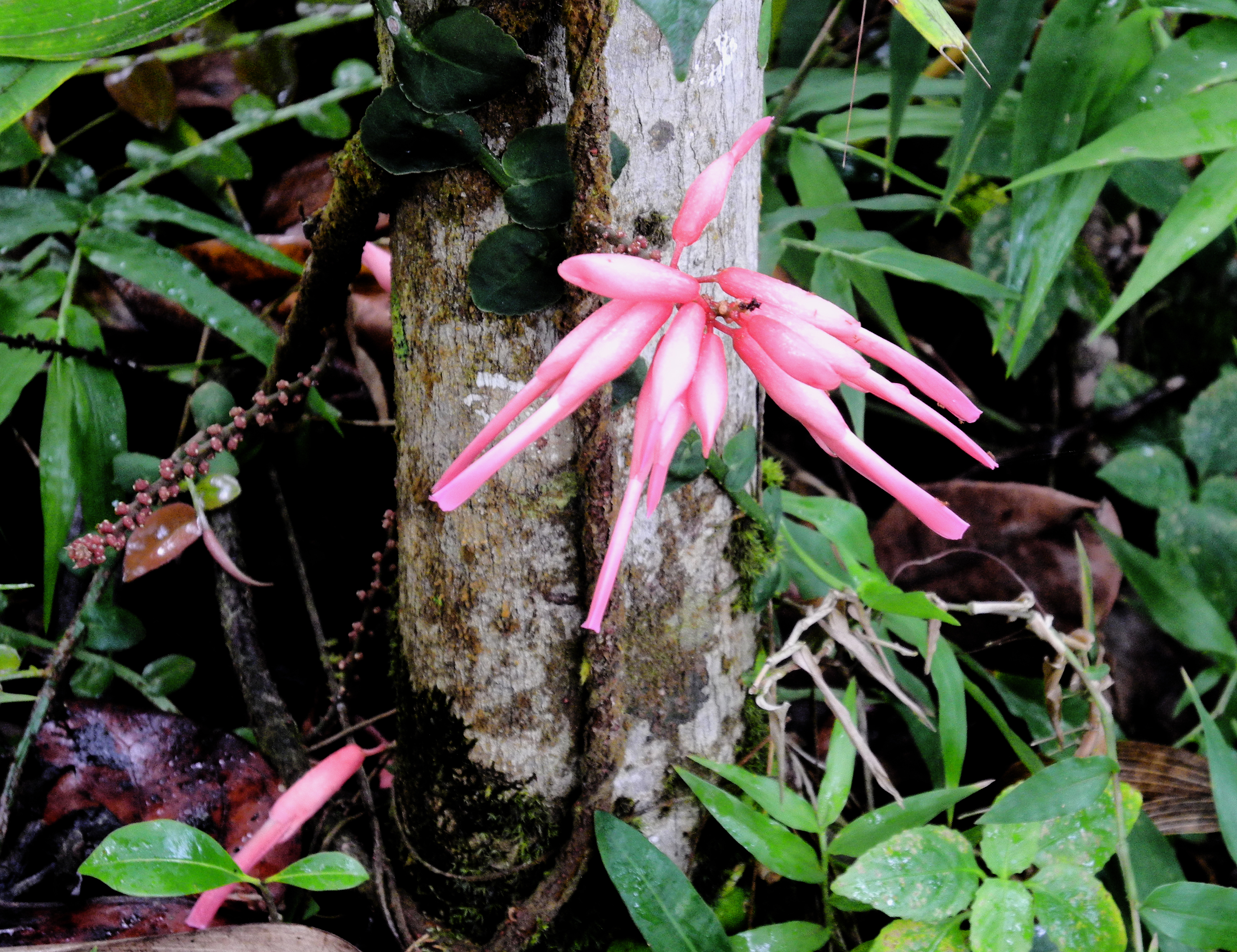
- Rhodopis volubilis in Puerto Rico

Scientific classification
- Kingdom: Plantae
- Clade: Tracheophytes
- Clade: Angiosperms
- Clade: Eudicots
- Clade: Rosids
- Order: Fabales
- Family: Fabaceae
- Subfamily: Faboideae
- Genus: Rhodopis
- Species: R. volubilis

Binomial name
- Rhodopis volubilis (Willd.) L.P.Queiroz (2020)

Synonyms
- Butea volubilis (Willd.) Pers. (1807); Erythrina cordifolia Juss. ex DC. (1825); Erythrina portoricensis Desf. (1804); Neorudolphia volubilis (Willd.) Britton (1924); Rudolphia portoricensis (Desf.) Sweet (1830); Rudolphia scandens Poir. (1827); Rudolphia sericea Steud. (1840), not validly publ.; Rudolphia volubilis Willd. (1801); Rudolphia volubilis var. pilosiuscula DC. (1825)

= Rhodopis volubilis =

Species of plant

Rhodopis volubilis is a species of flowering plant in the family Fabaceae. It is a climber endemic to Puerto Rico.
