= Physocoryna =

Scientific classification
- Kingdom: Animalia
- Phylum: Arthropoda
- Clade: Pancrustacea
- Class: Insecta
- Order: Coleoptera
- Suborder: Polyphaga
- Infraorder: Cucujiformia
- Family: Chrysomelidae
- Subfamily: Cassidinae
- Tribe: Chalepini
- Genus: Physocoryna; Guérin-Méneville, 1844

Genus of leaf beetles

Physocoryna is a genus of beetles belonging to the family Chrysomelidae.

== Species ==
- Physocoryna expansa Pic, 1925
- Physocoryna parvula Weise, 1921
- Physocoryna scabra Guérin-Méneville, 1844
