= Lackeya multiflora =

Conservation status
- Least Concern (IUCN 3.1)

Scientific classification
- Kingdom: Plantae
- Clade: Tracheophytes
- Clade: Angiosperms
- Clade: Eudicots
- Clade: Rosids
- Order: Fabales
- Family: Fabaceae
- Subfamily: Faboideae
- Genus: Lackeya
- Species: L. multiflora

Binomial name
- Lackeya multiflora (Torr. & A.Gray) Fortunato, L.P.Queiroz & G.P.Lewis (1996)

Synonyms
- Dioclea boykinii A.Gray ex S.Watson (1878); Dioclea multiflora (Torr. & A.Gray) C.Mohr (1901); Dolichos halei Alph.Wood (1870); Dolichos multiflorus Torr. & A.Gray (1838); Dolichos multiflorus var. halei Alph.Wood (1861); Galactia mohlenbrockii R.H.Maxwell (1979); Galactia mohlenbrockii var. halei (Alph.Wood) R.H.Maxwell (1979)

Species of climbing herbaceous plant

Lackeya multiflora is a climbing herbaceous plant that grows in warm temperate to subtropical riverine woodland, woodland margins and grassland. Its native range is central and south-eastern USA. It is found in the states of Alabama, Arkansas, Florida, Georgia, Illinois, Kentucky, Oklahoma, Tennessee and Texas. It has the common name of Boykin's clusterpea (Dioclea multiflora).

The genus name of Lackeya is in honour of James A. Lackey (b. 1943), American botanist at Iowa State University and the Smithsonian Institution and also specialist in Fabaceae and Phaseoleae families of plants. The Latin specific epithet of multiflora means multiple or many flowers. The species was first described as Dolichos multiflorus by Torr. & A.Gray in 1838. The genus Lackeya and new species name were described and published in Kew Bull. Vol.51 on pages 365–366 in 1996.
