= Oxychalepus centralis =

Scientific classification
- Kingdom: Animalia
- Phylum: Arthropoda
- Class: Insecta
- Order: Coleoptera
- Suborder: Polyphaga
- Infraorder: Cucujiformia
- Family: Chrysomelidae
- Genus: Oxychalepus
- Species: O. centralis

Binomial name
- Oxychalepus centralis Uhmann, 1940

Species of beetle

Oxychalepus centralis is a species of beetle of the family Chrysomelidae. It is found in Bolivia, Brazil and Paraguay.

== Description ==
Adults reach a length of about 7–9 mm. They have a black head, while the pronotum is orange with a large black medial spot. The elytron is orange with the apical one-fourth black and an anchor-like marking.
