= Oxychalepus bisignatus =

Scientific classification
- Kingdom: Animalia
- Phylum: Arthropoda
- Class: Insecta
- Order: Coleoptera
- Suborder: Polyphaga
- Infraorder: Cucujiformia
- Family: Chrysomelidae
- Genus: Oxychalepus
- Species: O. bisignatus

Binomial name
- Oxychalepus bisignatus (Chapuis, 1877)

Synonyms
- Odontota bisignata Chapuis, 1877; Chalepus (Xenochalepus) geometrica Weise, 1910

Species of beetle

Oxychalepus bisignatus is a species of beetle of the family Chrysomelidae. It is found in Argentina, Bolivia, Brazil and Ecuador.

== Description ==
Adults reach a length of about 6–8.6 mm. They have a black head and legs. The pronotum has a spot on the anterior margin and two reddish triangular markings. The elytron is black with two yellow bands, united by a discal band.
