= Neolithocolletis nsengai =

Scientific classification
- Kingdom: Animalia
- Phylum: Arthropoda
- Class: Insecta
- Order: Lepidoptera
- Family: Gracillariidae
- Genus: Neolithocolletis
- Species: N. nsengai

Binomial name
- Neolithocolletis nsengai de Prins, 2012

Species of moth

Neolithocolletis nsengai is a moth of the family Gracillariidae. It is found in the Democratic Republic of Congo (Bas-Congo province) in primary rain forest.

The length of the forewings is 1.69–2.01 millimetres (0.067–0.079 in).
