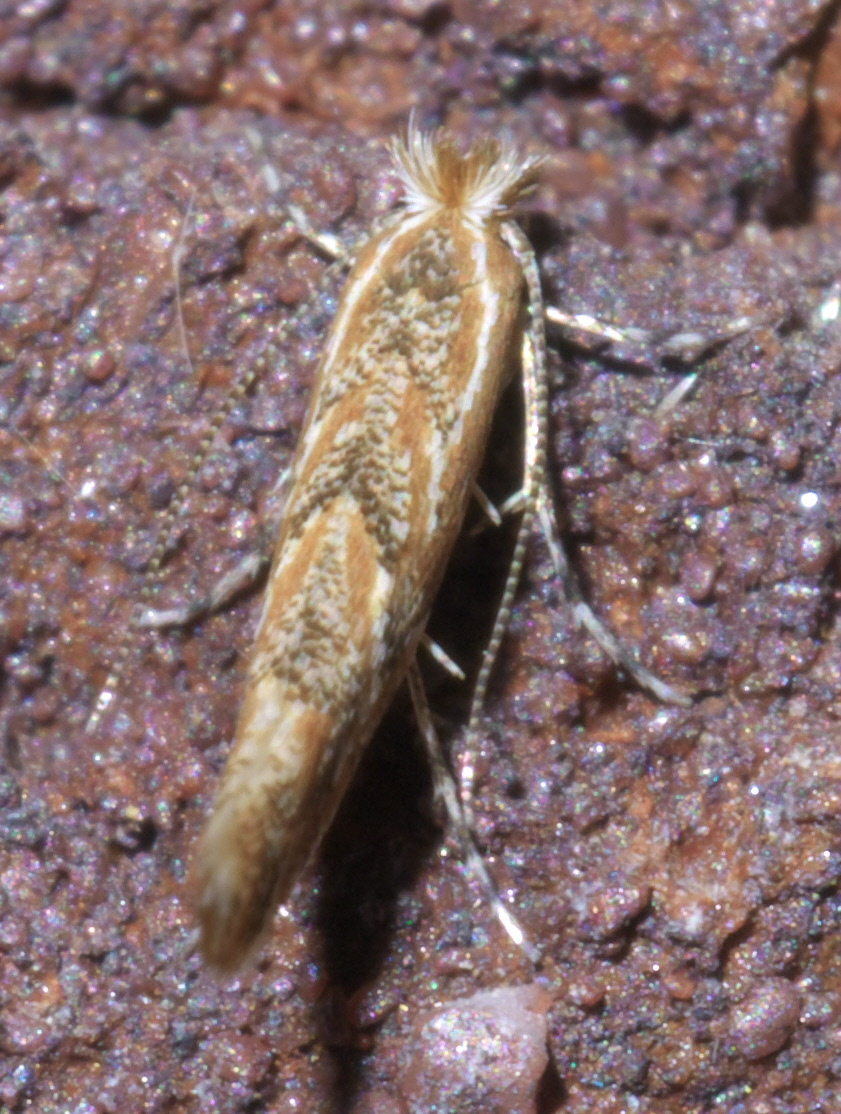

Scientific classification
- Domain: Eukaryota
- Kingdom: Animalia
- Phylum: Arthropoda
- Class: Insecta
- Order: Lepidoptera
- Family: Gracillariidae
- Subfamily: Lithocolletinae
- Genus: Cremastobombycia; Braun, 1908

Species
- See text

= Cremastobombycia =

Genus of moths

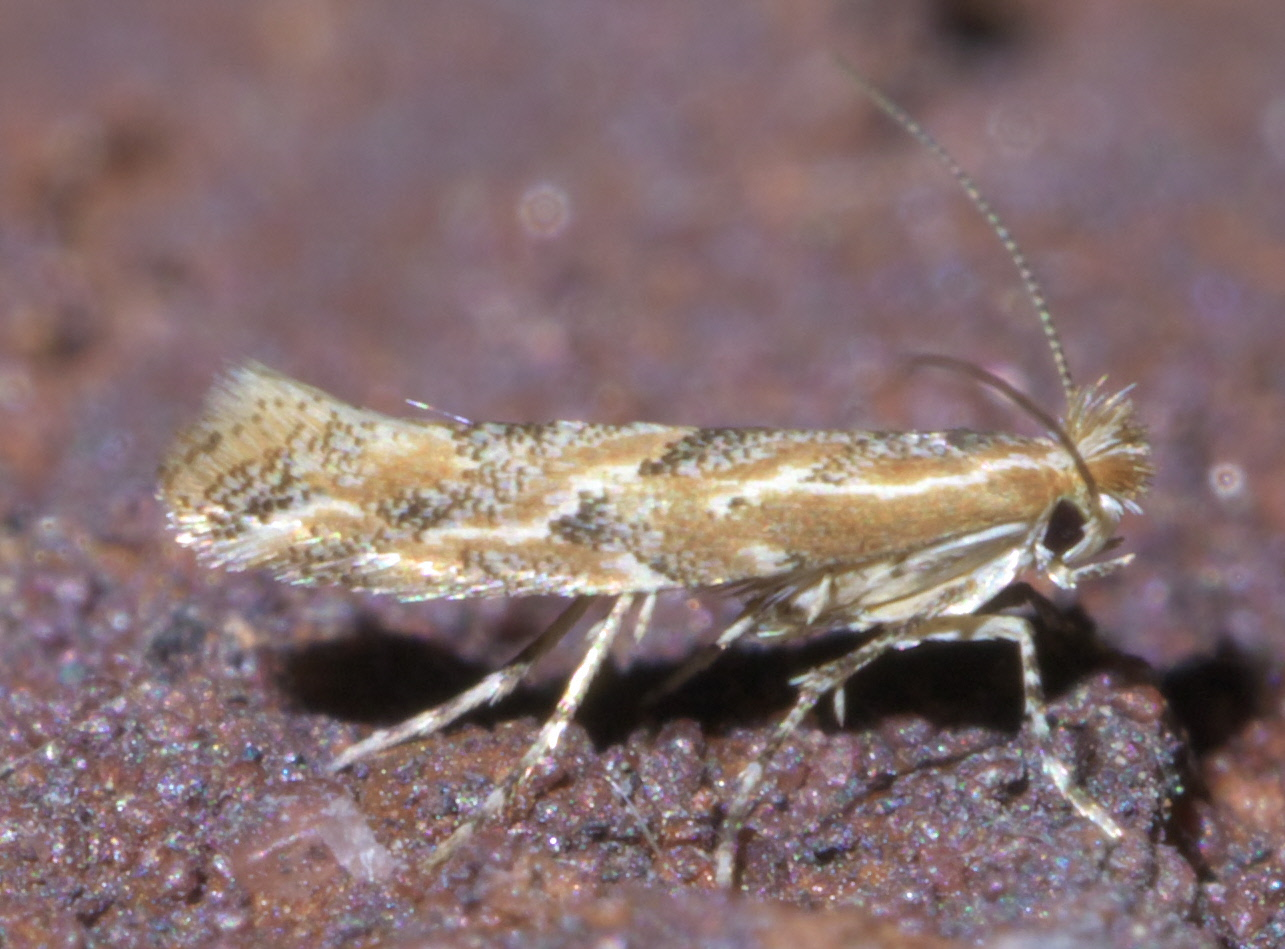
Cremastobombycia

Cremastobombycia is a genus of moths in the family Gracillariidae.

== Species ==
- Cremastobombycia ambrosiaeella (Chambers, 1871)
- Cremastobombycia grindeliella (Walsingham, 1891)
- Cremastobombycia ignota (Frey & Boll, 1873)
- Cremastobombycia kipepeo de Prins, 2012
- Cremastobombycia lantanella Busck, 1910
- Cremastobombycia morogorene de Prins, 2012
- Cremastobombycia solidaginis (Frey & Boll, 1876)
- Cremastobombycia verbesinella (Busck, 1900)
