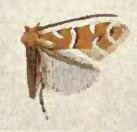

Scientific classification
- Domain: Eukaryota
- Kingdom: Animalia
- Phylum: Arthropoda
- Class: Insecta
- Order: Lepidoptera
- Family: Gracillariidae
- Genus: Cremastobombycia
- Species: C. ambrosiaeella

Binomial name
- Cremastobombycia ambrosiaeella (Chambers, 1871)

Synonyms
- Lithocolletis ambrosiaeella Chambers, 1871; Cremastobombycia ambrosiella (Frey & Boll, 1878); Cremastobombycia ambrosiella (Dyar, [1903]); Cremastobombycia amoena (Frey & Boll, 1878); Cremastobombycia nobilissima (Frey & Boll, 1878)

= Cremastobombycia ambrosiaeella =

Species of moth

Cremastobombycia ambrosiaeella is a moth of the family Gracillariidae. It is known from Ontario and Quebec Canada, and Illinois, Kentucky, Texas, Maine and New York in the United States.

The wingspan is 5.5-6.5 mm.

The larvae feed on Ambrosia species (including Ambrosia artemisiifolia and Ambrosia trifida), Helianthus species (including Helianthus giganteus), Heterotera squarrosa, Ridania alternifolia and Verbesina species (including Verbesina alternifolia). They mine the leaves of their host plant.
