= Neolithocolletis pentadesma =

Scientific classification
- Domain: Eukaryota
- Kingdom: Animalia
- Phylum: Arthropoda
- Class: Insecta
- Order: Lepidoptera
- Family: Gracillariidae
- Genus: Neolithocolletis
- Species: N. pentadesma

Binomial name
- Neolithocolletis pentadesma (Meyrick, 1919)

Synonyms
- Lithocolletis pentadesma Meyrick, 1919

Species of moth

Neolithocolletis pentadesma is a moth of the family Gracillariidae. It is known from Indonesia (Java), Malaysia (Sarawak, Selangor), the Philippines (Luzon) and the Seychelles.

The wingspan is 4.4–5 mm.

The larvae feed on Pterocarpus indicus and Pterocarpus javanicus. They mine the leaves of their host plant.
