= Hyloconis =

Scientific classification
- Kingdom: Animalia
- Phylum: Arthropoda
- Class: Insecta
- Order: Lepidoptera
- Family: Gracillariidae
- Subfamily: Lithocolletinae
- Genus: Hyloconis; Kumata, 1963

Species
- See text

Genus of moths

Hyloconis is a genus of moths in the family Gracillariidae. The type species is Hyloconis puerariae.

== Species ==
- Hyloconis bicruris Bai & Li, 2012
- Hyloconis desmodii Kumata, 1963
- Hyloconis improvisella (Ermolaev, 1986)
- Hyloconis lespedezae Kumata, 1963
- Hyloconis luki De Prins, 2012
- Hyloconis luminata Bai & Li, 2012
- Hyloconis puerariae Kumata, 1963
- Hyloconis wisteriae Kumata, 1963
