= Hyloconis puerariae =

Scientific classification
- Kingdom: Animalia
- Phylum: Arthropoda
- Class: Insecta
- Order: Lepidoptera
- Family: Gracillariidae
- Genus: Hyloconis
- Species: H. puerariae

Binomial name
- Hyloconis puerariae Kumata, 1963

Species of moth

Hyloconis puerariae is a moth of the family Gracillariidae. It is known from the island of Hokkaido in Japan and the Russian Far East.

The wingspan is 5.5-6.5 mm.

The larvae feed as leaf miners on Pueraria lobata, Lespedeza bicolor, Amphicarpaea bracteata and Amphicarpaea edgeworthii var. japonica.
