= Oxychalepus opacicollis =

Scientific classification
- Kingdom: Animalia
- Phylum: Arthropoda
- Class: Insecta
- Order: Coleoptera
- Suborder: Polyphaga
- Infraorder: Cucujiformia
- Family: Chrysomelidae
- Genus: Oxychalepus
- Species: O. opacicollis

Binomial name
- Oxychalepus opacicollis Ramos, 1998

Species of beetle

Oxychalepus opacicollis is a species of beetle of the family Chrysomelidae. It is found in Brazil (Amazonas), Ecuador, Peru and Trinidad.

== Description ==
Adults reach a length of about 6.5–8.3 mm. They have an orangish pronotum with a black medial stripe and lateral margins. The apical one-fourth of the elytron is black and there are anchor-shaped black markings in the basal area.
