= Cremastobombycia kipepeo =

Scientific classification
- Domain: Eukaryota
- Kingdom: Animalia
- Phylum: Arthropoda
- Class: Insecta
- Order: Lepidoptera
- Family: Gracillariidae
- Genus: Cremastobombycia
- Species: C. kipepeo

Binomial name
- Cremastobombycia kipepeo de Prins, 2012

Species of moth

Cremastobombycia kipepeo is a moth of the family Gracillariidae. It is found in eastern Kenya in east African coastal forest.

The length of the forewings is 1.76 mm.
