= Neolithocolletis hikomonticola =

Scientific classification
- Kingdom: Animalia
- Phylum: Arthropoda
- Class: Insecta
- Order: Lepidoptera
- Family: Gracillariidae
- Genus: Neolithocolletis
- Species: N. hikomonticola

Binomial name
- Neolithocolletis hikomonticola Kumata, 1963

Species of moth

Neolithocolletis hikomonticola is a moth of the family Gracillariidae. It is the type species of the genus and is known from Kyushu island in Japan.

The wingspan of adults is about 5.5 mm.

The larvae feed as leaf miners on Pueraria lobata. The mine is found on the lower surface of the leaf.
