= Oxychalepus alienus =

Scientific classification
- Kingdom: Animalia
- Phylum: Arthropoda
- Class: Insecta
- Order: Coleoptera
- Suborder: Polyphaga
- Infraorder: Cucujiformia
- Family: Chrysomelidae
- Genus: Oxychalepus
- Species: O. alienus

Binomial name
- Oxychalepus alienus (Baly, 1885)

Synonyms
- Chalepus alienus Baly, 1885; Chalepus (Xenochalepus) ancora mendax Weise, 1911

Species of beetle

Oxychalepus alienus is a species of beetle of the family Chrysomelidae. It is found in Colombia, Costa Rica, El Salvador, Honduras, Mexico, Nicaragua, Panama and Venezuela.

== Description ==
Adults reach a length of about 7.6–9 mm. They are yellowish, with a black head, antennae and legs. Both the pronotum and elytron have black markings.

== Biology ==
They have been recorded feeding on Centrosema macrocarpum and Cassia fruticosa.
