= Cremastobombycia morogorene =

Scientific classification
- Kingdom: Animalia
- Phylum: Arthropoda
- Class: Insecta
- Order: Lepidoptera
- Family: Gracillariidae
- Genus: Cremastobombycia
- Species: C. morogorene

Binomial name
- Cremastobombycia morogorene de Prins, 2012

Species of moth

Cremastobombycia morogorene is a moth of the family Gracillariidae. It is found in Tanzania in savannah vegetation with agricultural farms.

The length of the forewings is 2.25 mm.
