= Neolithocolletis =

Scientific classification
- Kingdom: Animalia
- Phylum: Arthropoda
- Class: Insecta
- Order: Lepidoptera
- Family: Gracillariidae
- Subfamily: Lithocolletinae
- Genus: Neolithocolletis; Kumata, 1963

Species
- See text

Genus of moths

Neolithocolletis is a genus of moths in the family Gracillariidae.

== Species ==
- Neolithocolletis hikomonticola Kumata, 1963
- Neolithocolletis kangarensis Kumata, 1993
- Neolithocolletis mayumbe De Prins, 2012
- Neolithocolletis nsengai De Prins, 2012
- Neolithocolletis pentadesma (Meyrick, 1919)
