= Protolithocolletis =

Scientific classification
- Kingdom: Animalia
- Phylum: Arthropoda
- Class: Insecta
- Order: Lepidoptera
- Family: Gracillariidae
- Subfamily: Lithocolletinae
- Genus: Protolithocolletis; Braun, 1929

Species
- See text

Genus of moths

Protolithocolletis is a genus of moths in the family Gracillariidae.

== Species ==
- Protolithocolletis lathyri Braun, 1929
