= Hyloconis bicruris =

Scientific classification
- Kingdom: Animalia
- Phylum: Arthropoda
- Class: Insecta
- Order: Lepidoptera
- Family: Gracillariidae
- Genus: Hyloconis
- Species: H. bicruris

Binomial name
- Hyloconis bicruris Bai & Li, 2012

Species of moth

Hyloconis bicruris is a moth of the family Gracillariidae. It is found in China (Sichuan).
