= Hyloconis improvisella =

Scientific classification
- Domain: Eukaryota
- Kingdom: Animalia
- Phylum: Arthropoda
- Class: Insecta
- Order: Lepidoptera
- Family: Gracillariidae
- Genus: Hyloconis
- Species: H. improvisella

Binomial name
- Hyloconis improvisella (Ermolaev, 1986)

Synonyms
- Lithocolletis improvisella Ermolaev, 1986

Species of moth

Hyloconis improvisella is a moth of the family Gracillariidae. It is known from the Russian Far East.

The larvae feed on Lespedeza bicolor. They probably mine the leaves of their host plant.
