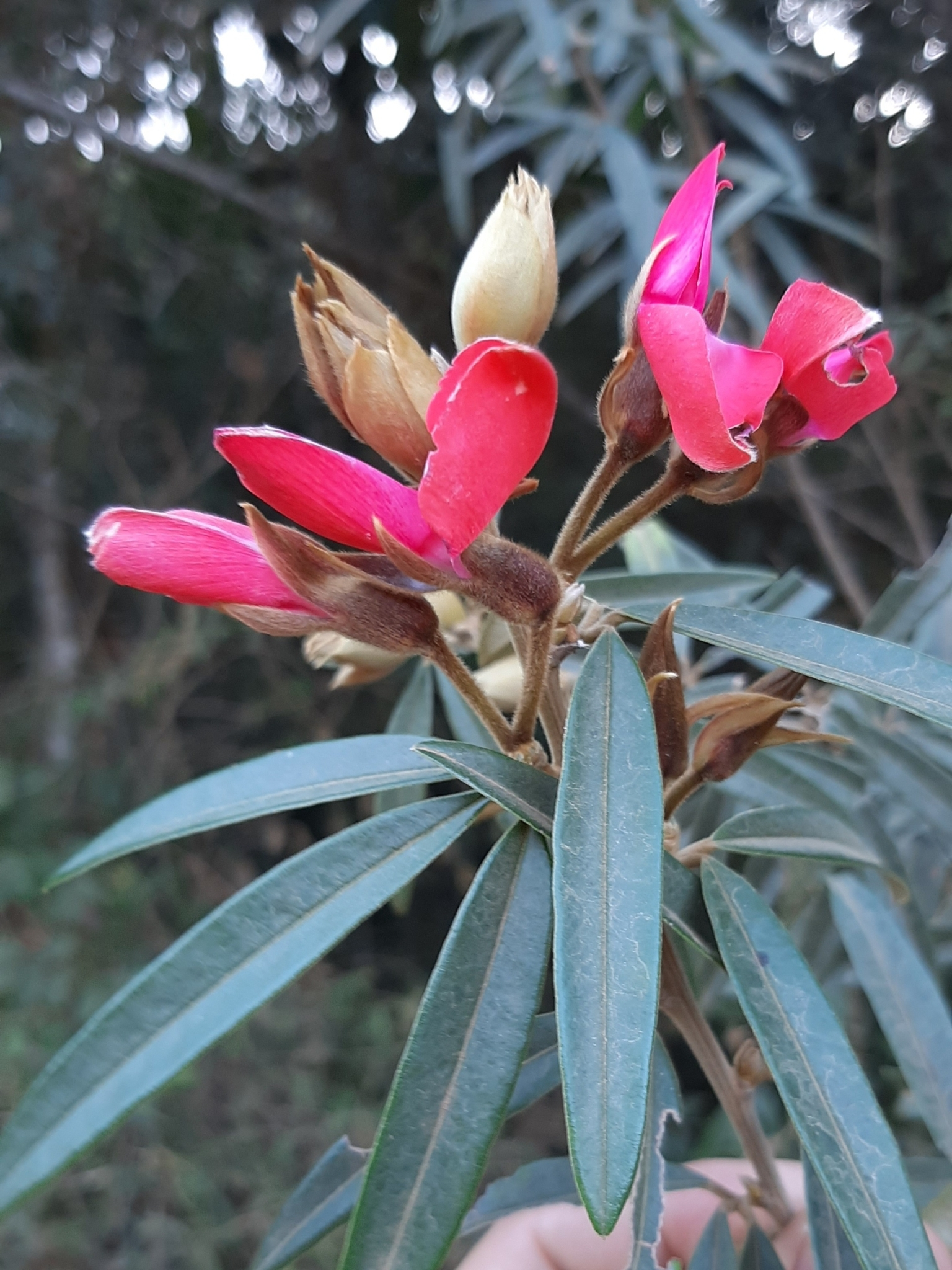
- Collaea speciosa in Brazil

Scientific classification
- Kingdom: Plantae
- Clade: Embryophytes
- Clade: Tracheophytes
- Clade: Spermatophytes
- Clade: Angiosperms
- Clade: Eudicots
- Clade: Rosids
- Order: Fabales
- Family: Fabaceae
- Subfamily: Faboideae
- Tribe: Diocleae
- Genus: Collaea; DC.

= Collaea =

Genus of legumes

Collaea is a genus of flowering plants in the legume family, Fabaceae. It belongs to subfamily Faboideae and tribe Diocleae. It includes five species native to the southern tropical South America, ranging from Peru to northeastern Brazil and northeastern Argentina.

As of July 2026, Plants of the World Online accepted these species:

- Collaea argentina Griseb.
- Collaea aschersoniana (Taub.) Burkart
- Collaea boliviana A.C.S.Oliveira, L.P.Queiroz & Snak
- Collaea caerulea A.C.S.Oliveira & L.P.Queiroz
- Collaea cardosoana A.C.S.Oliveira, L.P.Queiroz & Snak
- Collaea cipoensis Fortunato
- Collaea coccinea (Vell.) A.C.S.Oliveira & H.F.Menezes
- Collaea insignis M.J.Silva
- Collaea limae A.C.S.Oliveira, L.P.Queiroz & Snak
- Collaea maxima A.C.S.Oliveira, L.P.Queiroz & Snak
- Collaea paraguariensis (Hassl.) R.C.García
- Collaea speciosa (Loisel.) DC.
- Collaea stenophylla (Hook. & Arn.) Benth.
