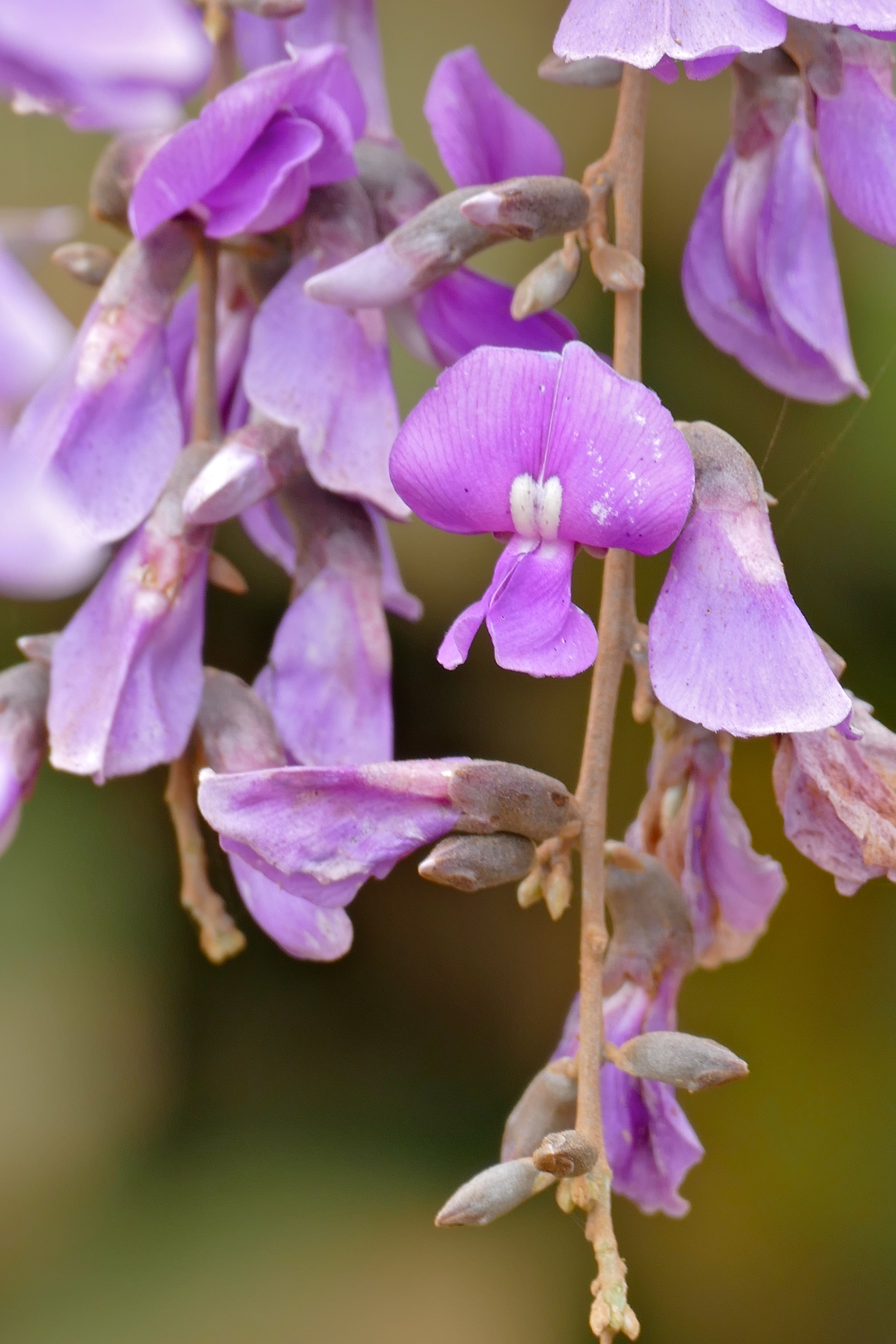
- Cratylia argentea

Scientific classification
- Kingdom: Plantae
- Clade: Embryophytes
- Clade: Tracheophytes
- Clade: Spermatophytes
- Clade: Angiosperms
- Clade: Eudicots
- Clade: Rosids
- Order: Fabales
- Family: Fabaceae
- Subfamily: Faboideae
- Tribe: Diocleae
- Genus: Cratylia; Mart. ex Benth. (1837)

Species
- 8; see text

= Cratylia =

Genus of legumes

Cratylia is a genus of legume in the family Fabaceae. It includes eight species native to tropical South America, from Peru and northern Brazil to northeastern Argentina.

== Species ==
As of August 2023, Plants of the World Online accepted the following species:

- Cratylia argentea (Desv.) Kuntze
- Cratylia bahiensis L.P.Queiroz
- Cratylia hypargyraea Mart. ex Benth.
- Cratylia intermedia (Hassl.) L.P.Queiroz & R.Monteiro
- Cratylia isopetala (Lam.) L.P.Queiroz
- Cratylia mollis Mart. ex Benth.
- Cratylia nuda Tul.
- Cratylia nutans Herzog
