= Oxychalepus paranormalis =

Scientific classification
- Kingdom: Animalia
- Phylum: Arthropoda
- Class: Insecta
- Order: Coleoptera
- Suborder: Polyphaga
- Infraorder: Cucujiformia
- Family: Chrysomelidae
- Genus: Oxychalepus
- Species: O. paranormalis

Binomial name
- Oxychalepus paranormalis Ramos, 1998

Species of beetle

Oxychalepus paranormalis is a species of beetle of the family Chrysomelidae. It is found in Brazil, and was described by Ramos in 1998 .

Adult beetles measure approximately 9.1-10.4 mm in body length. Their pronotum is orangish, marked with one medial and two lateral black stripes; the apical one-fourth of each elytron (wing-cover) is black, and there is an anchor-shaped black marking toward the base of each elytron.

This species belongs to the tribe Chalepini of the genus Oxychalepus, which includes several similar species distinguished by elytral patterning, coloration, and body size. Comparative figures of O. paranormalis appear in “A review of the genus Oxychalepus Uhmann, 1937 (Coleoptera: Chrysomelidae: Cassidinae)”(Staines, 2010).

== Description ==
Adults reach a length of about 9.1–10.4 mm. They have an orangish pronotum with one medial and two lateral black stripes. The apical one-fourth of the elytron is black and there is an anchor-shaped black marking in the basal area.
