= Physocoryna parvula =

Scientific classification
- Kingdom: Animalia
- Phylum: Arthropoda
- Class: Insecta
- Order: Coleoptera
- Suborder: Polyphaga
- Infraorder: Cucujiformia
- Family: Chrysomelidae
- Genus: Physocoryna
- Species: P. parvula

Binomial name
- Physocoryna parvula Weise, 1921

Species of beetle

Physocoryna parvula is a species of beetle of the family Chrysomelidae. It is found in Brazil and Paraguay.

== Description ==
Adults reach a length of about 3-3.6 mm. Adults are yellowish with black markings.

== Biology ==
The food plant is unknown.
