= Neolithocolletis mayumbe =

Scientific classification
- Kingdom: Animalia
- Phylum: Arthropoda
- Class: Insecta
- Order: Lepidoptera
- Family: Gracillariidae
- Genus: Neolithocolletis
- Species: N. mayumbe

Binomial name
- Neolithocolletis mayumbe de Prins, 2012

Species of moth

Neolithocolletis mayumbe is a moth of the family Gracillariidae. It is ony known from the Democratic Republic of Congo where it inhabits West African primary forest.

The length of the forewings is about 2.1 millimetres (0.083 in). Adults have been recorded on wing in late March.

== Etymology ==
The name refers to the type locality, the Mayumbe Forest.
