= Hyloconis desmodii =

Scientific classification
- Kingdom: Animalia
- Phylum: Arthropoda
- Class: Insecta
- Order: Lepidoptera
- Family: Gracillariidae
- Genus: Hyloconis
- Species: H. desmodii

Binomial name
- Hyloconis desmodii Kumata, 1963

Species of moth

Hyloconis desmodii is a moth of the family Gracillariidae. It is known from Kyushu island Japan.

The wingspan is 5–6 mm.

The larvae feed on Desmodium racemosum. They probably mine the leaves of their host plant.
