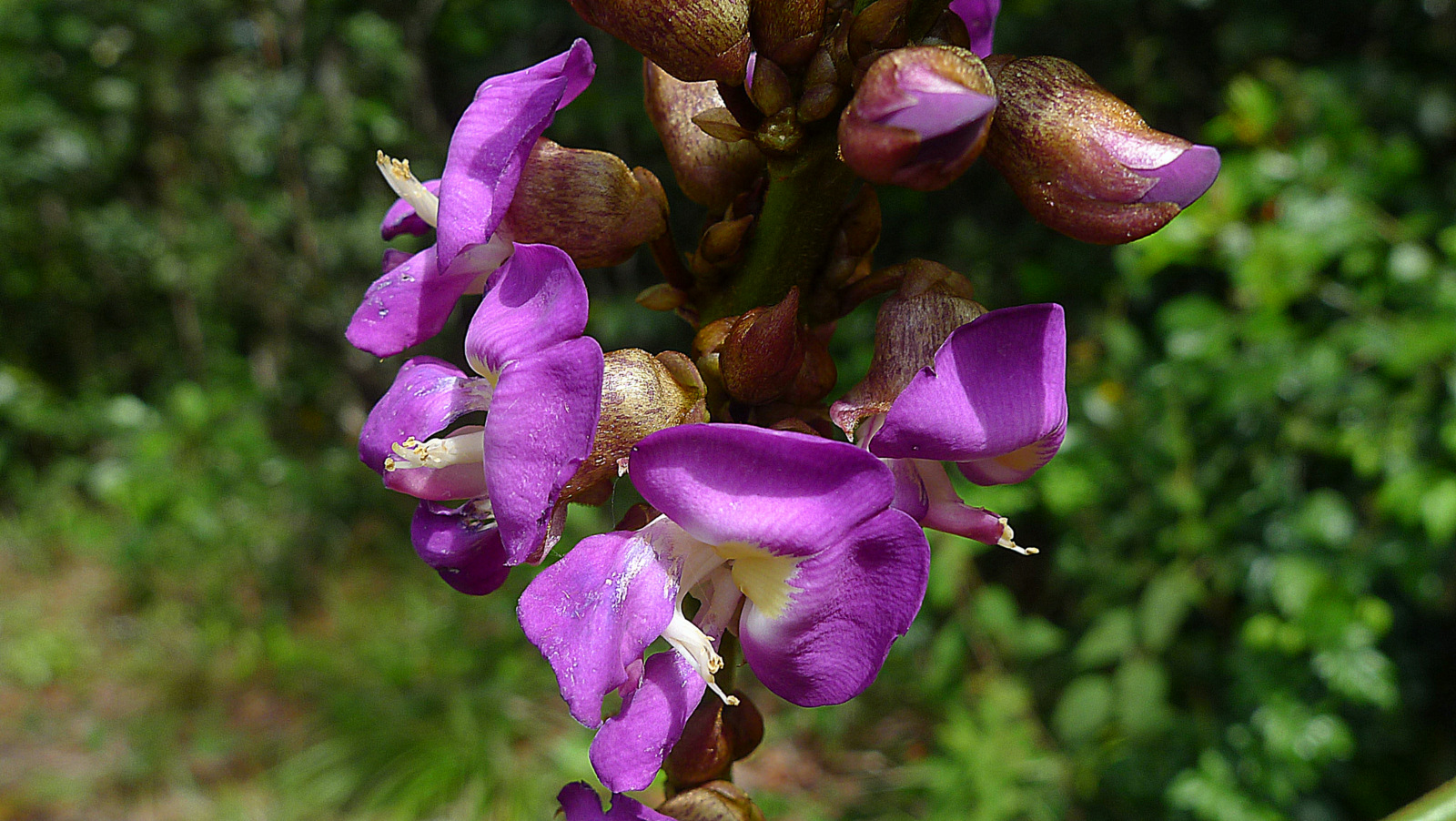
- Macropsychanthus edulis

Scientific classification
- Kingdom: Plantae
- Clade: Tracheophytes
- Clade: Angiosperms
- Clade: Eudicots
- Clade: Rosids
- Order: Fabales
- Family: Fabaceae
- Subfamily: Faboideae
- Tribe: Diocleae
- Genus: Macropsychanthus; Harms

Species
- See text.

Synonyms
- Luzonia Elmer (1907)

= Macropsychanthus =

Genus of legumes

Macropsychanthus is a genus of flowering plants in the legume family, Fabaceae. It belongs to the tribe Diocleae, subfamily Faboideae. The genus has 47 species with a pantropical distribution, ranging through the tropical Americas from southern Mexico to northeastern Argentina, west and central Africa, Madagascar, Indochina, Malesia, Papuasia, and Queensland.

== Taxonomy ==
Many species of Dioclea were transferred to the genus Macropsychanthus as a result of a molecular phylogenetic study published in 2020.

=== Species ===
As of August 2021, Plants of the World Online accepted the following species:

- Macropsychanthus apiculatus (R.H.Maxwell) L.P.Queiroz & Snak
- Macropsychanthus aureus (R.H.Maxwell) L.P.Queiroz & Snak
- Macropsychanthus bicolor (Hoffmanns. ex Benth.) L.P.Queiroz & Snak
- Macropsychanthus circinatus (R.H.Maxwell) L.P.Queiroz & Snak
- Macropsychanthus comosus (G.Mey.) L.P.Queiroz & Snak
- Macropsychanthus coriaceus (Benth.) L.P.Queiroz & Snak
- Macropsychanthus dictyoneurus (Diels) L.P.Queiroz & Snak
- Macropsychanthus dolichobotrys Holthuis
- Macropsychanthus duckei L.P.Queiroz & Snak
- Macropsychanthus edulis (Kuhlm.) L.P.Queiroz & Snak
- Macropsychanthus erectus (Hoehne) L.P.Queiroz & Snak
- Macropsychanthus ferrugineus Merr.
- Macropsychanthus flexuosus (Ducke) L.P.Queiroz & Snak
- Macropsychanthus funalis (Poepp.) L.P.Queiroz & Snak
- Macropsychanthus glabrus (Benth.) L.P.Queiroz & Snak
- Macropsychanthus grandiflorus (Mart. ex Benth.) L.P.Queiroz & Snak
- Macropsychanthus grandistipulus (L.P.Queiroz) L.P.Queiroz & Snak
- Macropsychanthus haughtii (R.H.Maxwell) L.P.Queiroz & Snak
- Macropsychanthus hexander (Ralph) L.P.Queiroz & Snak
- Macropsychanthus hispidimarginatus (R.H.Maxwell) L.P.Queiroz & Snak
- Macropsychanthus huberi (Ducke) L.P.Queiroz & Snak
- Macropsychanthus jamesonii (R.H.Maxwell) L.P.Queiroz & Snak
- Macropsychanthus javanicus (Benth.) L.P.Queiroz & Snak
- Macropsychanthus latifolius (Benth.) L.P.Queiroz & Snak
- Macropsychanthus lauterbachii Harms
- Macropsychanthus macrocarpus (Huber) L.P.Queiroz & Snak
- Macropsychanthus malacocarpus (Ducke) L.P.Queiroz & Snak
- Macropsychanthus marginatus (Benth.) L.P.Queiroz & Snak
- Macropsychanthus megacarpus (Rolfe) L.P.Queiroz & Snak
- Macropsychanthus mindanaensis Merr.
- Macropsychanthus mollicomus (Ducke) L.P.Queiroz & Snak
- Macropsychanthus pulcher (Moldenke) L.P.Queiroz & Snak
- Macropsychanthus purpureus (Elmer) L.P.Queiroz & Snak
- Macropsychanthus rigidus (R.S.Cowan) L.P.Queiroz & Snak
- Macropsychanthus ruddiae (R.H.Maxwell) L.P.Queiroz & Snak
- Macropsychanthus rufescens (Benth.) L.P.Queiroz & Snak
- Macropsychanthus scaber (Rich.) L.P.Queiroz & Snak
- Macropsychanthus schimpffii (Diels) L.P.Queiroz & Snak
- Macropsychanthus schottii (Benth.) L.P.Queiroz & Snak
- Macropsychanthus sclerocarpus (Ducke) L.P.Queiroz & Snak
- Macropsychanthus ucayalinus (Harms) L.P.Queiroz & Snak
- Macropsychanthus umbrinus (Elmer) L.P.Queiroz & Snak
- Macropsychanthus violaceus (Mart. ex Benth.) L.P.Queiroz & Snak
- Macropsychanthus wilsonii (Standl.) L.P.Queiroz & Snak
