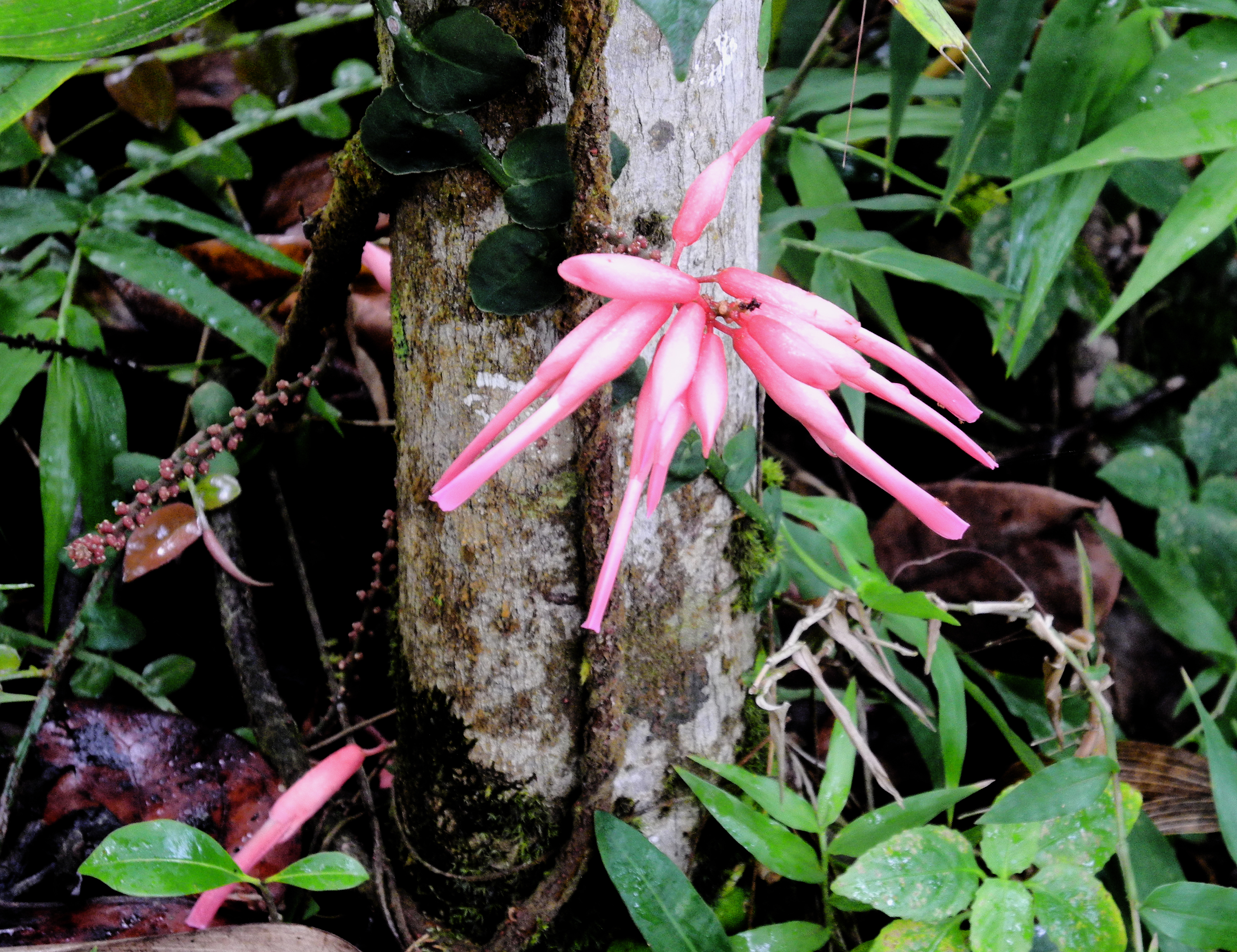
- Rhodopis volubilis

Scientific classification
- Kingdom: Plantae
- Clade: Tracheophytes
- Clade: Angiosperms
- Clade: Eudicots
- Clade: Rosids
- Order: Fabales
- Family: Fabaceae
- Subfamily: Faboideae
- Tribe: Diocleae
- Genus: Rhodopis; Urb. (1900)

Synonyms
- Neorudolphia Britton (1924); Rudolphia Willd. (1801), nom. illeg.

= Rhodopis (plant) =

Genus of legumes

Rhodopis is a genus of flowering plants in the legume family, Fabaceae. It includes three species native to the West Indies.

The genus belongs to the tribe Diocleae in subfamily Faboideae.

== Species ==
Three species are accepted:

- Rhodopis planisiliqua (L.) Urb. – Hispaniola
- Rhodopis rudolphioides (Griseb.) L.P.Queiroz – Bahamas, Hispaniola, and eastern Cuba
- Rhodopis volubilis (Willd.) L.P.Queiroz – Puerto Rico
