= Protolithocolletis lathyri =

Scientific classification
- Kingdom: Animalia
- Phylum: Arthropoda
- Class: Insecta
- Order: Lepidoptera
- Family: Gracillariidae
- Genus: Protolithocolletis
- Species: P. lathyri

Binomial name
- Protolithocolletis lathyri Braun, 1929

Species of moth

Protolithocolletis lathyri is a moth of the family Gracillariidae. It is known from California and Michigan in the United States and from British Columbia east to Manitoba in Canada.

The larvae feed on Lathyrus venosus and Lathyrus japonicus. They mine the leaves of their host plant. The mine is tentiform partially folding the leaflet.
