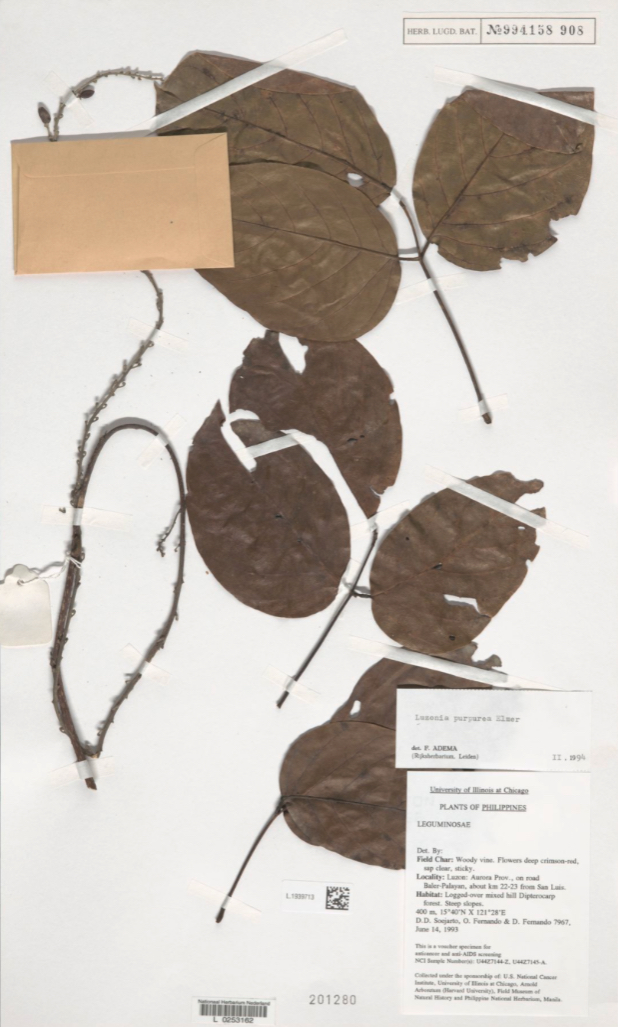

Scientific classification
- Kingdom: Plantae
- Clade: Tracheophytes
- Clade: Angiosperms
- Clade: Eudicots
- Clade: Rosids
- Order: Fabales
- Family: Fabaceae
- Subfamily: Faboideae
- Genus: Macropsychanthus
- Species: M. purpureus

Binomial name
- Macropsychanthus purpureus (Elmer) L.P.Queiroz & Snak (2020)

Synonyms
- Luzonia purpurea Elmer (1907)

= Macropsychanthus purpureus =

Genus of legumes

Macropsychanthus purpureus is a species of flowering plant in the legume family, Fabaceae. It is a scrambling shrub or tree endemic to the Philippines.
