= Dioclea (plant) =

Scientific classification
- Kingdom: Plantae
- Clade: Tracheophytes
- Clade: Angiosperms
- Clade: Eudicots
- Clade: Rosids
- Order: Fabales
- Family: Fabaceae
- Subfamily: Faboideae
- Tribe: Diocleae
- Genus: Dioclea; Kunth

Species
- See text.

Synonyms
- Crepidotropis Walp.; Hymenospron Spreng.; Lepidamphora Zoll. ex Miq.

Genus of legumes

Dioclea is a genus of flowering plants in the pea family, Fabaceae, that is native to the Americas. The seeds of these legumes are buoyant drift seeds, and are dispersed by rivers.

== Taxonomy ==
A molecular phylogenetic study published in 2020 showed that when broadly circumscribed, Dioclea was not monophyletic. Many species were transferred to the genus Macropsychanthus.

=== Species ===
As of August 2021, Plants of the World Online accepted the following species:

- Dioclea albiflora R.S.Cowan
- Dioclea apurensis Kunth
- Dioclea burkartii R.H.Maxwell
- Dioclea fimbriata Huber
- Dioclea guianensis Benth.
- Dioclea holtiana Pittier ex R.H.Maxwell
- Dioclea lasiophylla Mart. ex Benth.
- Dioclea lehmannii Diels
- Dioclea macrantha Huber
- Dioclea ovalis R.H.Maxwell
- Dioclea paniculata Killip ex R.H.Maxwell
- Dioclea sericea Kunth
- Dioclea vallensis R.H.Maxwell
- Dioclea virgata (Rich.) Amshoff

Species transferred to Macropsychanthus include:

- Dioclea grandiflora → Macropsychanthus grandiflorus
- Dioclea macrocarpa → Macropsychanthus macrocarpus
- Dioclea megacarpa → Macropsychanthus megacarpus
- Dioclea schimpffii → Macropsychanthus schimpffii

== Chemistry ==
The A-type proanthocyanidin, epigallocatechin-(2β→7,4β→8)-epicatechin, together with epicatechin, luteolin 3′β-d-glucopyranoside, chrysoeriol 7β-d-glucopyranoside and 2-methylpentan-2,4-diol, can be found in the leaves of Dioclea lasiophylla.
