= Macropsychanthus schimpffii =

Conservation status
- Data Deficient (IUCN 3.1)

Scientific classification
- Kingdom: Plantae
- Clade: Embryophytes
- Clade: Tracheophytes
- Clade: Spermatophytes
- Clade: Angiosperms
- Clade: Eudicots
- Clade: Rosids
- Order: Fabales
- Family: Fabaceae
- Subfamily: Faboideae
- Genus: Macropsychanthus
- Species: M. schimpffii

Binomial name
- Macropsychanthus schimpffii (Diels) L.P.Queiroz & Snak

Synonyms
- Dioclea schimpffii Diels

Species of legume

Macropsychanthus schimpffii is a species of legume in the family Fabaceae. It is found only in Ecuador. Its natural habitat is subtropical or tropical moist lowland forests.
