= Cremastobombycia lantanella =

Scientific classification
- Kingdom: Animalia
- Phylum: Arthropoda
- Clade: Pancrustacea
- Class: Insecta
- Order: Lepidoptera
- Family: Gracillariidae
- Genus: Cremastobombycia
- Species: C. lantanella

Binomial name
- Cremastobombycia lantanella Busck, 1910

Species of moth

Cremastobombycia lantanella, commonly known as the lantana leaf miner, is a moth in the family Gracillariidae. It was first described by August Busck in 1910. It is native to the southern United States, including Texas, as well as Mexico. It was introduced to Hawaii in 1902 as a biological control agent against invasive lantana species.

The wingspan is about 7mm.
