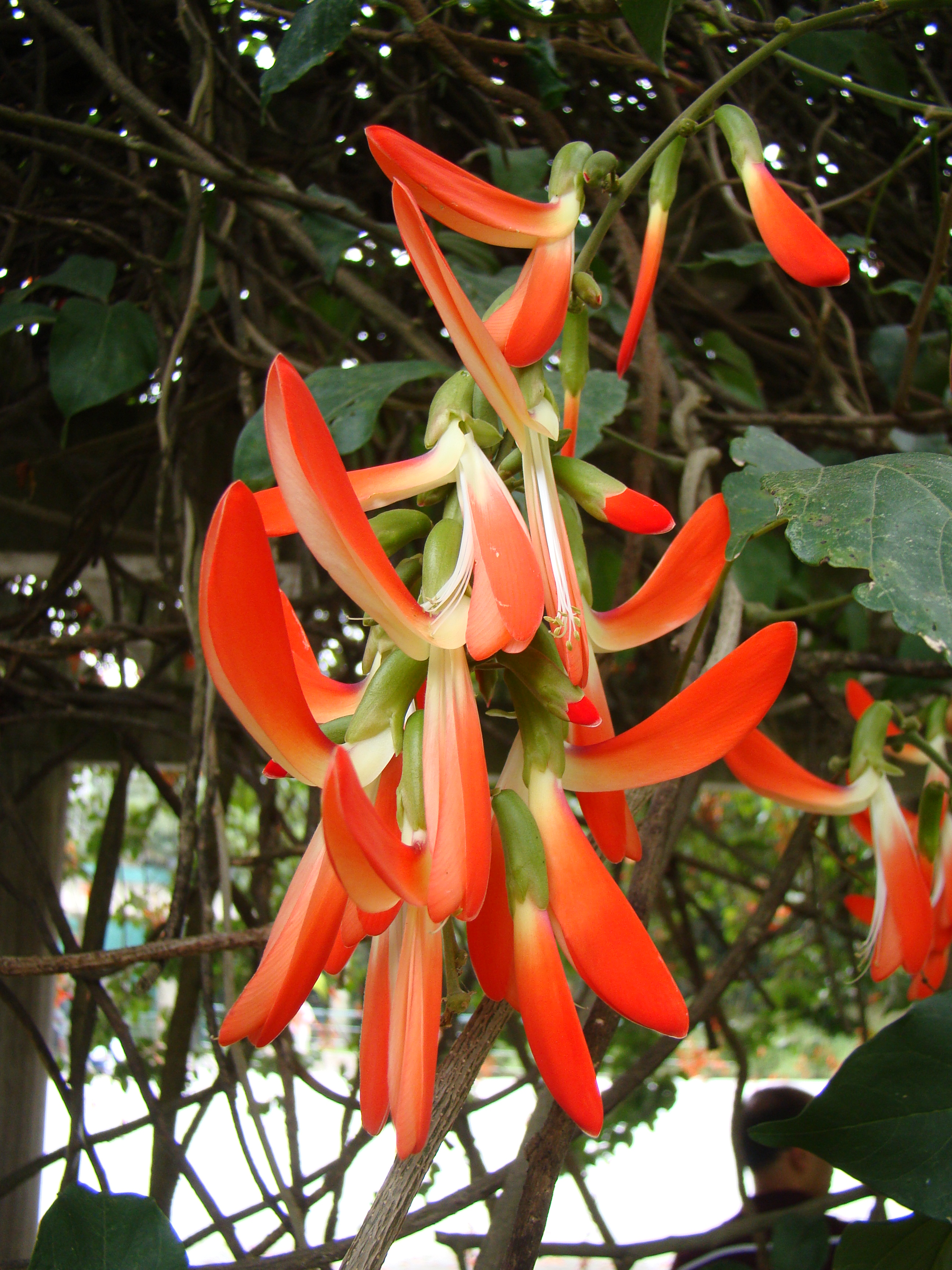
- Camptosema grandiflora

Scientific classification
- Kingdom: Plantae
- Clade: Embryophytes
- Clade: Tracheophytes
- Clade: Spermatophytes
- Clade: Angiosperms
- Clade: Eudicots
- Clade: Rosids
- Order: Fabales
- Family: Fabaceae
- Subfamily: Faboideae
- Tribe: Diocleae
- Genus: Camptosema; Hook. & Arn.

= Camptosema =

Genus of legumes

Camptosema is a genus of flowering plants in the legume family, Fabaceae. It includes five species native to South America, ranging from northeastern Brazil to Bolivia and northeastern Argentina. It belongs to the subfamily Faboideae and tribe Diocleae.

- Camptosema goiasana R.S.Cowan – eastern Bolivia and west-central Brazil
- Camptosema nobile Lindm. – west-central Brazil (Mato Grosso)
- Camptosema rubicundum Hook. & Arn. – eastern Bolivia, Paraguay, west-central and southern Brazil, northeastern Argentina, and Uruguay
- Camptosema sanctae-barbarae Taub. – west-central Brazil (Goiás)
- Camptosema spectabile (Tul.) Burkart – eastern Brazil
