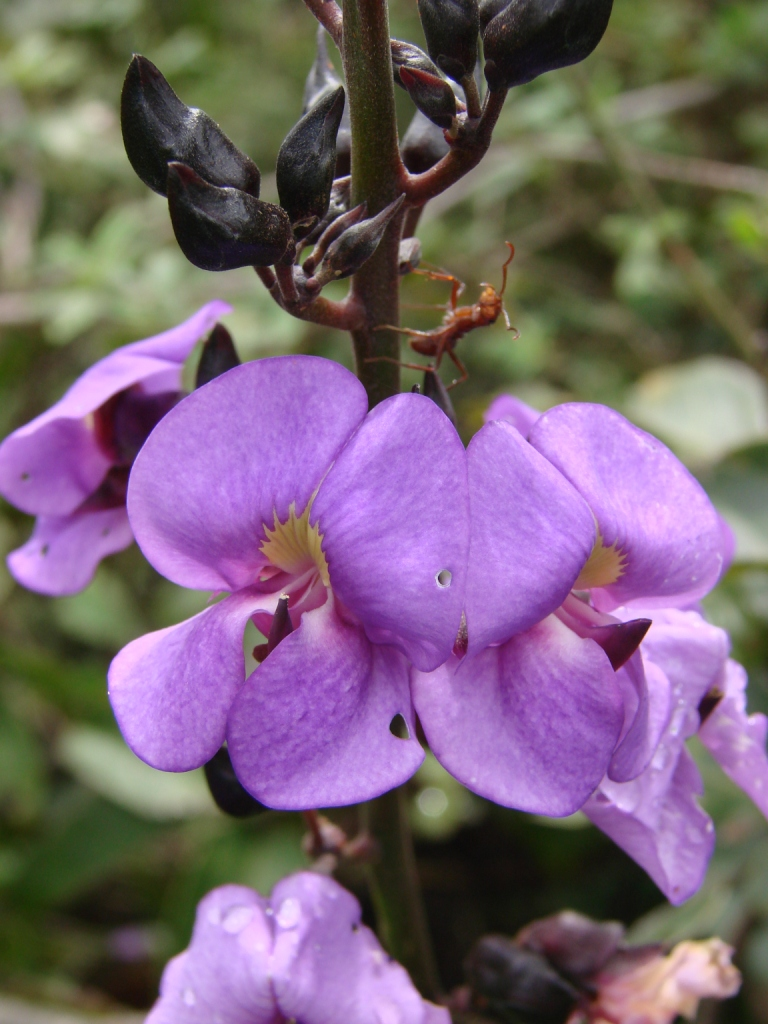

Scientific classification
- Kingdom: Plantae
- Clade: Tracheophytes
- Clade: Angiosperms
- Clade: Eudicots
- Clade: Rosids
- Order: Fabales
- Family: Fabaceae
- Subfamily: Faboideae
- Genus: Macropsychanthus
- Species: M. grandiflorus

Binomial name
- Macropsychanthus grandiflorus (Mart. ex Benth.) L.P.Queiroz & Snak

Synonyms
- Dioclea grandiflora Mart. ex Benth.

= Macropsychanthus grandiflorus =

Species of legume

Macropsychanthus grandiflorus is a species of legume native to South America (Bolivia and Brazil). The seeds of Macropsychanthus grandiflorus contain a well-characterized lectin named DGL which is similar to other legume lectins.

== See also ==
- ConA
