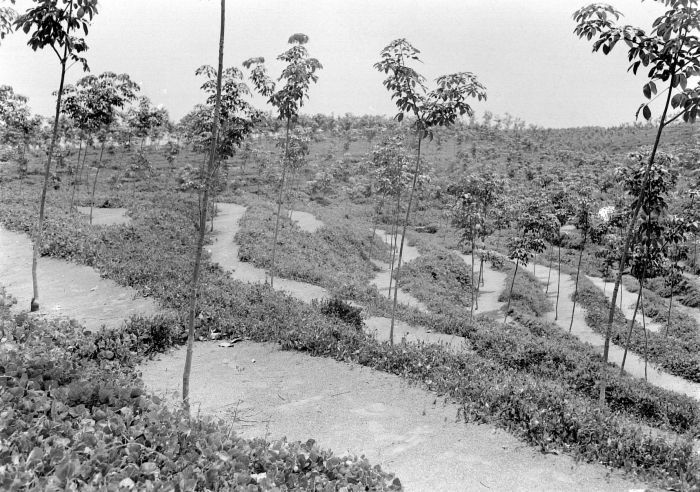
- Calopogonium spp.

Scientific classification
- Kingdom: Plantae
- Clade: Tracheophytes
- Clade: Angiosperms
- Clade: Eudicots
- Clade: Rosids
- Order: Fabales
- Family: Fabaceae
- Subfamily: Faboideae
- Subtribe: Glycininae
- Genus: Calopogonium; Desv. (1826)

Type species
- Calopogonium mucunoides Desv.

Species
- 8; see text

Synonyms
- Cyanostremma Benth. ex Hook. & Arn. (1840); Stenolobium Benth. (1837)

= Calopogonium =

Genus of legumes

Calopogonium is a genus of flowering plants in the legume family, Fabaceae. It includes eight species, which range through the tropical Americas from Mexico through Central America, the Caribbean, and northern South America to northeastern Argentina. It belongs to the subfamily Faboideae.

Species of Calopogonium have been introduced to other regions, including tropical Africa, India, southern China, southeast Asia, New Guinea, and Australia.

== Species ==
Eight species are accepted:

- Calopogonium caeruleum (Benth.) C.Wright
- Calopogonium domingense Urb. & Ekman
- Calopogonium galactioides (Kunth) Benth. ex Hemsl.
- Calopogonium lanceolatum Brandegee
- Calopogonium mucunoides Desv.
- Calopogonium racemosum Micheli
- Calopogonium sericeum (Benth.) Chodat & Hassl.
- Calopogonium velutinum (Benth.) Amshoff
