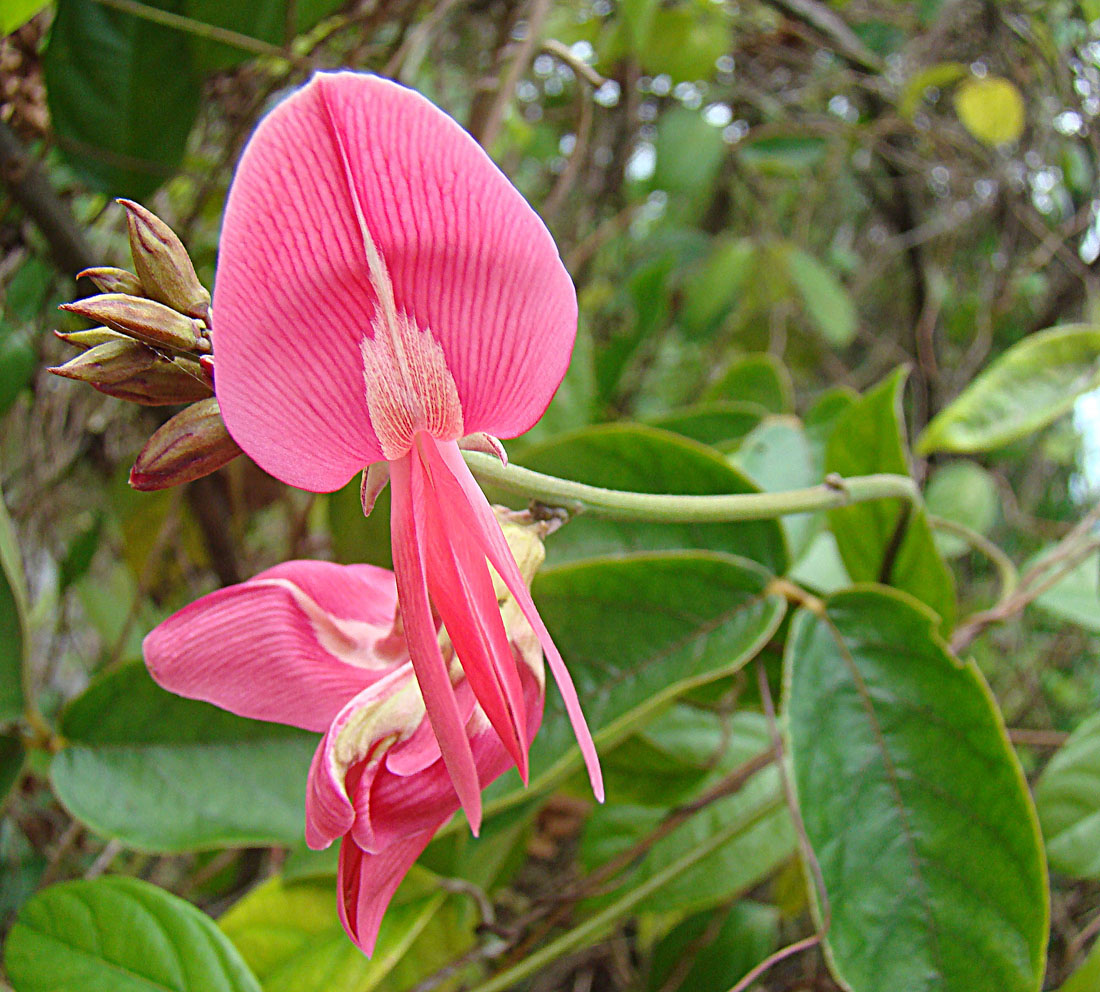

Scientific classification
- Kingdom: Plantae
- Clade: Tracheophytes
- Clade: Angiosperms
- Clade: Eudicots
- Clade: Rosids
- Order: Fabales
- Family: Fabaceae
- Subfamily: Faboideae
- Tribe: Diocleae
- Genus: Cymbosema; Benth. (1840)
- Species: C. roseum

Binomial name
- Cymbosema roseum Benth. (1840)

Synonyms
- Dioclea purpurea Poepp. (1845); Dioclea rosea (Benth.) N.Zamora (2000)

= Cymbosema =

Genus of legumes

Cymbosema is a genus of flowering plants in the legume family, Fabaceae. It includes a single species, Cymbosema roseum, a liana native to the tropical Americas. It ranges from southeastern Mexico to Bolivia and northeastern and west-central Brazil. Typical habitats include tropical lowland rain forest and riverine forest.

Cymbosema belongs to subfamily Faboideae and tribe Diocleae. It may be synonymous with Dioclea.
