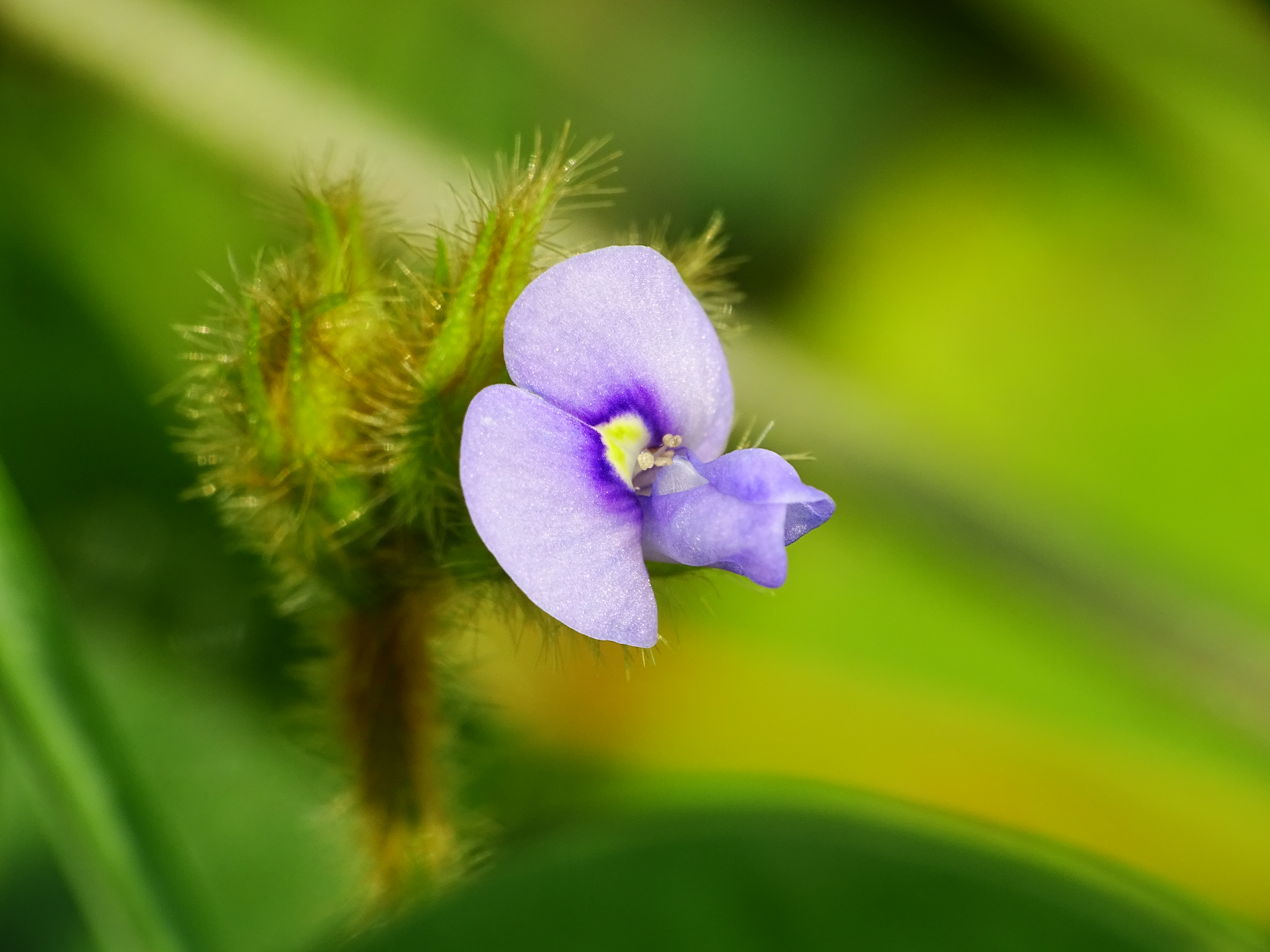
- Close-up of flower
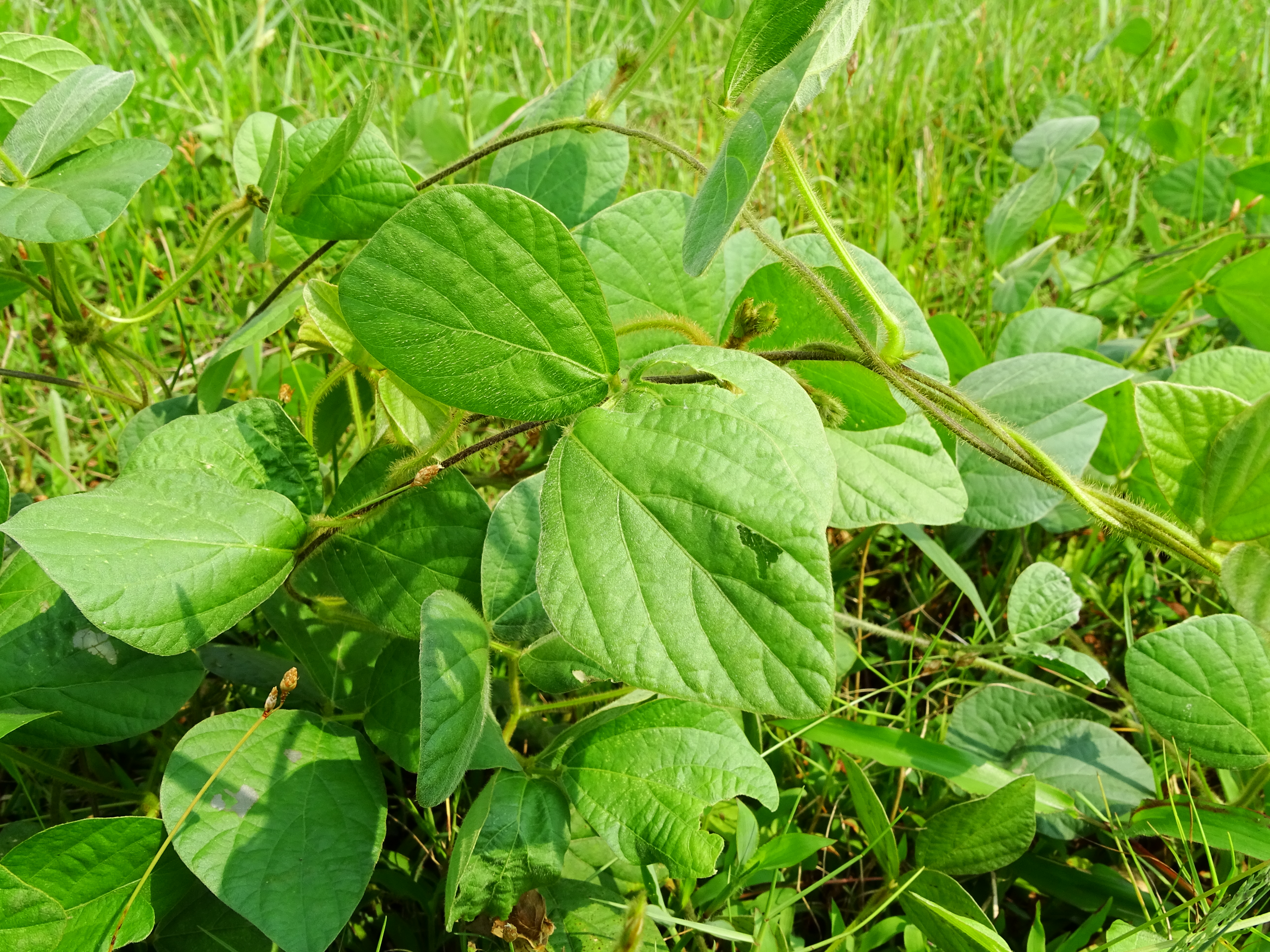
- Twining habit

Scientific classification
- Kingdom: Plantae
- Clade: Tracheophytes
- Clade: Angiosperms
- Clade: Eudicots
- Clade: Rosids
- Order: Fabales
- Family: Fabaceae
- Subfamily: Faboideae
- Genus: Calopogonium
- Species: C. mucunoides

Binomial name
- Calopogonium mucunoides Desv.

Synonyms
- List: Calopogonium brachycarpum (Benth.) Benth. ex Hemsl.; Calopogonium flavidum Brandegee; Calopogonium orthocarpum Urb.; Stenolobium brachycarpum Benth.; Stenolobium brachycarpum var. brachystachyum Benth.

= Calopogonium mucunoides =

Species of flowering plant

Calopogonium mucunoides, called calopo and wild ground nut, is a species of flowering plant in the family Fabaceae, native to the New World Tropics, and introduced as a forage crop and a green manure to the tropics of Africa, Madagascar, the Indian Subcontinent, Asia, Malesia, Papuasia, and Australia. In some locales it has become a serious invasive species.
