= Macropsychanthus megacarpus =

Scientific classification
- Kingdom: Plantae
- Clade: Tracheophytes
- Clade: Angiosperms
- Clade: Eudicots
- Clade: Rosids
- Order: Fabales
- Family: Fabaceae
- Subfamily: Faboideae
- Genus: Macropsychanthus
- Species: M. megacarpus

Binomial name
- Macropsychanthus megacarpus (Rolfe) L.P.Queiroz & Snak

Synonyms
- Dioclea densiflora Huber; Dioclea megacarpa Rolfe; Dioclea reflexa var. grandiflora Benth.; Macropsychanthus densiflorus (Huber) L.P.Queiroz & Snak

Species of plant

Macropsychanthus megacarpus (syn. Dioclea megacarpa) is a species of flowering plant in the family Fabaceae, native to Central America, Colombia, Peru, Bolivia, northern Brazil, Trinidad and Tobago, and the Windward Islands. A climber, it is typically found in wet tropical rainforests. Its seeds contain large amounts of the non-proteinogenic amino acid L-canavanine, which replaces the essential arginine producing abnormal proteins and enzymes and resulting in severe malnutrition to insect pests and other herbivores.
