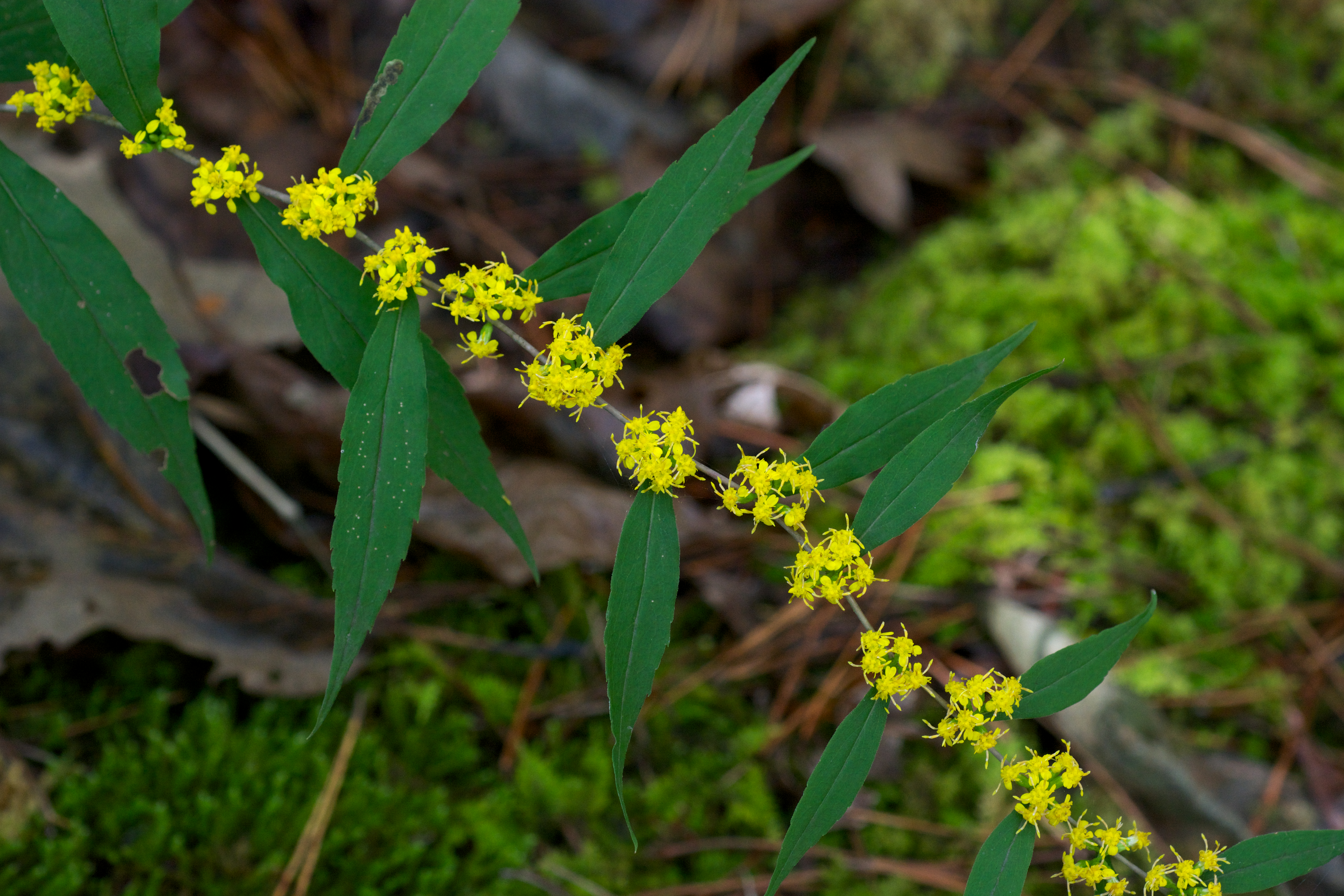

Scientific classification
- Kingdom: Plantae
- Clade: Tracheophytes
- Clade: Angiosperms
- Clade: Eudicots
- Clade: Asterids
- Order: Asterales
- Family: Asteraceae
- Genus: Solidago
- Species: S. caesia

Binomial name
- Solidago caesia L.

Synonyms
- Aster caesius (L.) Kuntze; Solidago axillaris herb.banks ex Pursh; Solidago caesia f. caesia; Solidago caesia var. axillaris (Pursh) A.Gray; Solidago caesia var. caesia L.; Solidago caesia var. paniculata A.Gray; Solidago gracilis hort.par. ex Poir.; Solidago lateriflora Raf. ex DC.

= Solidago caesia =

Species of plant

Solidago caesia, commonly named blue-stemmed goldenrod, wreath goldenrod, or woodland goldenrod, is a flowering plant native to North America.

== Description ==
Key identification features include a dark, wiry, blue or purple stem, and flower heads in the leaf axils instead of in a large array at the top of the plant. Prefers medium to part shade, and can often be found in wooded areas.

== Distribution ==
It grows in the central and eastern parts of the continent from Manitoba east to New Brunswick, south as far as Florida and eastern Texas.

=== Galls ===
This species is host to the following insect induced galls:

- Asphondylia silva
- Asteromyia carbonifera (Osten Sacken, 1862)
- Gnorimoschema gallaeasterella (Kellicott, 1878)

external link to gallformers
