= List of moths of Australia (Incurvariidae) =

Partial list of Australian moths

This is a list of the Australian moth species of the family Incurvariidae. It also acts as an index to the species articles and forms part of the full List of moths of Australia.

- Perthida glyphopa Common, 1969
- Perthida pentaspila (Meyrick, 1916)
- Perthida phoenicopa (Meyrick, 1893)
- Perthida tetraspila (Lower, 1905)

The following species belong to the family Incurvariidae, but have not been assigned to a genus yet. Given here is the original name given to the species when it was first described:

- Tinea aelurodes Meyrick, 1893
- Tinea epimochla Meyrick, 1893
- Tinea incredibilis Meyrick, 1920
- Tinea microspora Meyrick, 1893
- Tinea monopthalma Meyrick, 1893
- Tinea nectarea Meyrick, 1893
- Tinea phauloptera Meyrick, 1893
- Tinea spodina Meyrick, 1893
- Tinea vetula Meyrick, 1893
