= Paraclemensia incerta =

Scientific classification
- Kingdom: Animalia
- Phylum: Arthropoda
- Clade: Pancrustacea
- Class: Insecta
- Order: Lepidoptera
- Family: Incurvariidae
- Genus: Paraclemensia
- Species: P. incerta

Binomial name
- Paraclemensia incerta (Christoph, 1882)

Synonyms
- Tinea incerta Christoph, 1882

Species of moth

Paraclemensia incerta is a moth of the family Incurvariidae. It is found in Japan (Hokkaido, Honshu, Shikoku, Kyushu) and Russia.

The wingspan is 12–14.5 mm for males and 13–15 mm for females.

The larvae feed on Acer species, Carpinus tschonoskii, Sorbus alnifolia, Lyonia ovalifolia, Wisteria floribunda, Kalopanax pictus and Castanea crenata.
