= Paraclemensia viridis =

Scientific classification
- Kingdom: Animalia
- Phylum: Arthropoda
- Class: Insecta
- Order: Lepidoptera
- Family: Incurvariidae
- Genus: Paraclemensia
- Species: P. viridis

Binomial name
- Paraclemensia viridis Nielsen, 1982

Species of moth

Paraclemensia viridis is a moth of the family Incurvariidae. It is found in Japan (Kyushu).

The wingspan is 10–14 mm. The forewings are dark brown with a greenish lustre.

The larvae feed on Carpinus species, including Carpinus tschonoskii.
