= Alloclemensia maculata =

Scientific classification
- Kingdom: Animalia
- Phylum: Arthropoda
- Class: Insecta
- Order: Lepidoptera
- Family: Incurvariidae
- Genus: Alloclemensia
- Species: A. maculata

Binomial name
- Alloclemensia maculata Nielsen, 1981

Species of moth

Alloclemensia maculata is a moth of the family Incurvariidae. It is found in Japan on the islands of Hokkaido, Honshu, Shikoku and Kyushu.

The larvae feed on Viburnum species, including Viburnum furcatum. They create a depressed orbicular case consisting of two pieces of the same size. Pupation takes place in spring.
