= Alloclemensia minima =

Scientific classification
- Domain: Eukaryota
- Kingdom: Animalia
- Phylum: Arthropoda
- Class: Insecta
- Order: Lepidoptera
- Family: Incurvariidae
- Genus: Alloclemensia
- Species: A. minima

Binomial name
- Alloclemensia minima Kozlov, 1987

Synonyms
- Phylloporia minima

Species of moth

Alloclemensia minima is a moth of the family Incurvariidae. It was described by Kozlov in 1987. It is found in Russia.
