= Simacauda dicommatias =

Scientific classification
- Kingdom: Animalia
- Phylum: Arthropoda
- Class: Insecta
- Order: Lepidoptera
- Family: Incurvariidae
- Genus: Simacauda
- Species: S. dicommatias

Binomial name
- Simacauda dicommatias (Meyrick, 1931)

Synonyms
- Lampronia dicommatias Meyrick, 1931

Species of moth

Simacauda dicommatias is a moth of the family Incurvariidae found in South America. It was described by the English amateur entomologist, Edward Meyrick in 1931. The larvae are leaf miners and feed within the leaves of Chilean myrtle (Luma apiculata). In 2020 leaf mines were found at Trengwainton Garden, Cornwall; the first known occurrence in Europe.

== Life cycle ==
Ovum

Eggs have not been observed but are likely to be inserted into the underside of a leaf of Chilean myrtle, preferring new growth towards the end of a stem.

Larvae

The larvae mine the leaves, initially in a long gallery filled with black frass and often cross the midrib. The mine terminates in a small, irregular blotch often at, or near the edge or tip. Larvae then leave the mine making a larval case from the blotch; it then makes a further two cases from leaves. In Cornwall the species is univoltine with tenanted mines found in late March, late June and in the autumn. Larvae have not been found in Argentina or Chile.

Pupa

The larva pupates in the third case which, is away from the feeding area and attached to the underside of a leaf.

Imago

Simacauda dicommatias is similar to Psychoides filicivora and care should be taken when recording either species in Cornwall where both larval foodplants occur.

=== Food plants ===
In Cornwall, larvae have been found at twenty-six sites on Chilean myrtle. At one site cases were also found on white Chilean myrtle (Luma chequen), and another on an unidentified Myrtaceae, but could be Myrceugenia ovata.

== Parasitoids ==
So far, two parasitoids have been found in Cornish larval cases. Pnigalio soemius was reared from a larval case found at Trelissick in December 2020 and Enytus apostata, an ichneumon found in a larval case at Trengwainton Garden in June 2021.

== Distribution ==
Simacauda dicommatias is native to temperate Andean forests in Argentina and Chile. In 2020, larval feeding signs were found in Cornwall, Great Britain; the first known record of this species for the UK and mainland Europe.

== See also ==
- Plant Parasites of Europe
