= Plesiozela patagonica =

Scientific classification
- Kingdom: Animalia
- Phylum: Arthropoda
- Clade: Pancrustacea
- Class: Insecta
- Order: Lepidoptera
- Family: Incurvariidae
- Genus: Plesiozela
- Species: P. patagonica

Binomial name
- Plesiozela patagonica Karsholt & Kristensen, 2003

Species of moth

Plesiozela patagonica is a species of moth in the family Incurvariidae. It was described by Ole Karsholt and Niels P. Kristensen in 2003 and can be found in Argentina.
