= Alloclemensia americana =

Scientific classification
- Kingdom: Animalia
- Phylum: Arthropoda
- Class: Insecta
- Order: Lepidoptera
- Family: Incurvariidae
- Genus: Alloclemensia
- Species: A. americana

Binomial name
- Alloclemensia americana Nielsen, 1981

Species of moth

Alloclemensia americana is a moth of the family Incurvariidae. It is found in north-eastern North America.
