= Paraclemensia oligospina =

Scientific classification
- Kingdom: Animalia
- Phylum: Arthropoda
- Class: Insecta
- Order: Lepidoptera
- Family: Incurvariidae
- Genus: Paraclemensia
- Species: P. oligospina

Binomial name
- Paraclemensia oligospina Nielsen, 1982

Species of moth

Paraclemensia oligospina is a moth of the family Incurvariidae. It is found in Japan (Honshu and Kyushu islands).

The wingspan is 10–11.5 mm for males and 9.5 mm for females.
