= Paraclemensia caerulea =

Scientific classification
- Kingdom: Animalia
- Phylum: Arthropoda
- Clade: Pancrustacea
- Class: Insecta
- Order: Lepidoptera
- Family: Incurvariidae
- Genus: Paraclemensia
- Species: P. caerulea

Binomial name
- Paraclemensia caerulea (Issiki, 1957)

Synonyms
- Tschabia caerulea Issiki, 1957

Species of moth

Paraclemensia caerulea is a moth of the family Incurvariidae. It is found on the islands of Honshu, Shikoku and Kyushu in Japan.

The wingspan is 9–12.5 mm for males and 9.5–12 mm for females.
