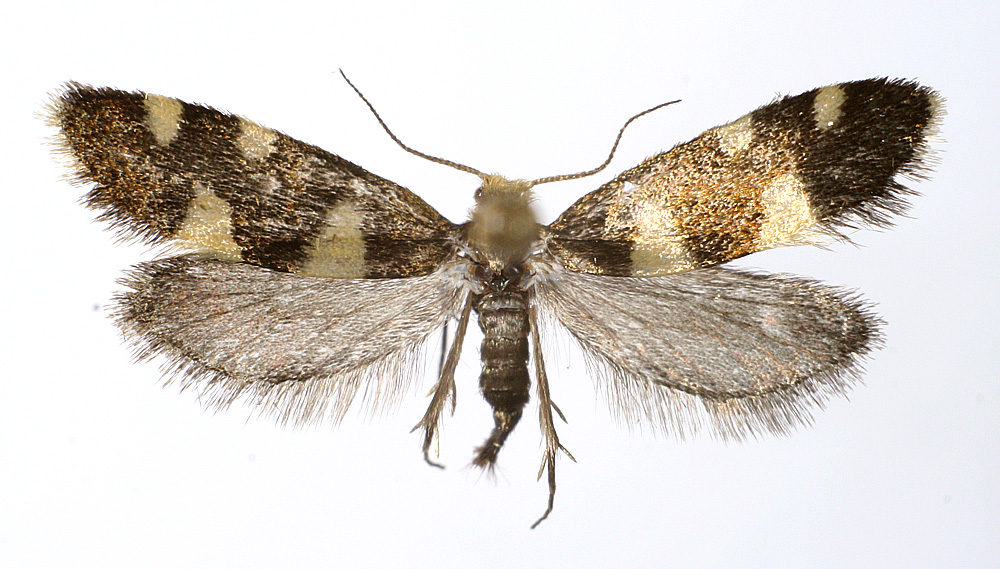

Scientific classification
- Domain: Eukaryota
- Kingdom: Animalia
- Phylum: Arthropoda
- Class: Insecta
- Order: Lepidoptera
- Family: Incurvariidae
- Genus: Alloclemensia
- Species: A. mesospilella

Binomial name
- Alloclemensia mesospilella (Herrich-Schäffer, 1854)

Synonyms
- Incurvaria mesospilella Herrich-Schäffer, 1854; Incurvaria trimaculella Herrich-Schäffer, 1854; Incurvaria quadrimaculella Höfner, 1876

= Alloclemensia mesospilella =

Species of moth

Alloclemensia mesospilella is a moth of the family Incurvariidae. It is found from Fennoscandia and northern Russia to the Pyrenees, Italy, and Romania.

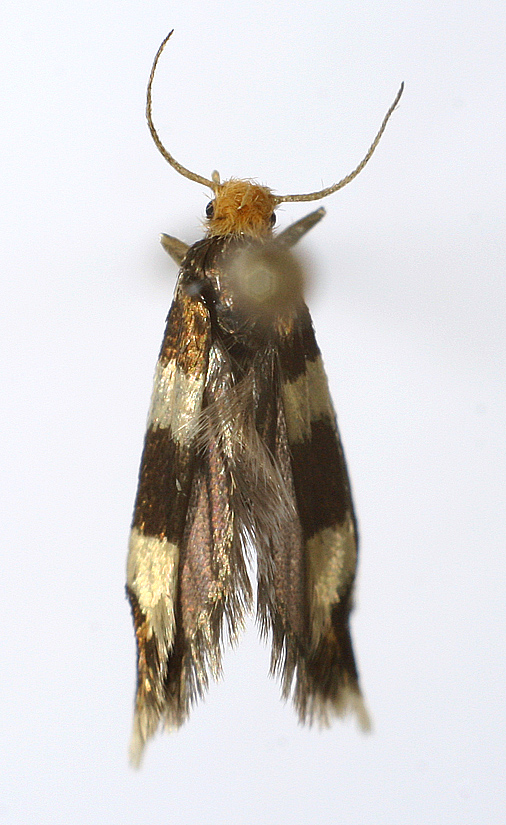

The wingspan is 12–15 mm.

The larvae feed on Ribes alpinum, Ribes uva-crispa and Saxifraga rotundifolia. They mine the leaves of their host plant.
