= Plesiozela nielseni =

Scientific classification
- Kingdom: Animalia
- Phylum: Arthropoda
- Clade: Pancrustacea
- Class: Insecta
- Order: Lepidoptera
- Family: Incurvariidae
- Genus: Plesiozela
- Species: P. nielseni

Binomial name
- Plesiozela nielseni Karsholt & Kristensen, 2003

Species of moth

Plesiozela nielseni is a moth of the Heliozelidae family. It was described by Ole Karsholt and Niels P. Kristensen in 2003. It is found in Argentina.
