= Simacauda virescens =

Scientific classification
- Kingdom: Animalia
- Phylum: Arthropoda
- Class: Insecta
- Order: Lepidoptera
- Family: Incurvariidae
- Genus: Simacauda
- Species: S. virescens

Binomial name
- Simacauda virescens Nielsen & Davis, 1981

Species of moth

Simacauda virescens is a moth of the family Incurvariidae. It was described by Nielsen and Davis in 1981. It is found in Argentina.
