= Alloclemensia devotella =

Scientific classification
- Kingdom: Animalia
- Phylum: Arthropoda
- Clade: Pancrustacea
- Class: Insecta
- Order: Lepidoptera
- Family: Incurvariidae
- Genus: Alloclemensia
- Species: A. devotella

Binomial name
- Alloclemensia devotella (Rebel, 1893)

Synonyms
- Lampronia devotella Rebel, 1893; Incurvaria devotella; Incurvaria muchei Soffner, 1969

Species of moth

Alloclemensia devotella is a moth of the family Incurvariidae. It was described by Rebel in 1893. It is found in the Caucasus.
