= Vespina slovaciella =

Scientific classification
- Domain: Eukaryota
- Kingdom: Animalia
- Phylum: Arthropoda
- Class: Insecta
- Order: Lepidoptera
- Family: Incurvariidae
- Genus: Vespina
- Species: V. slovaciella

Binomial name
- Vespina slovaciella (Zagulajev & Tokar, 1990)

Synonyms
- Lampronia slovaciella Zagulajev & Tokar, 1990

Species of moth

Vespina slovaciella is a moth of the family Incurvariidae. It is found in Slovakia and Hungary.

The larva feeds on Acer species.
