= Alloclemensia unifasciata =

Scientific classification
- Kingdom: Animalia
- Phylum: Arthropoda
- Class: Insecta
- Order: Lepidoptera
- Family: Incurvariidae
- Genus: Alloclemensia
- Species: A. unifasciata

Binomial name
- Alloclemensia unifasciata Nielsen, 1981

Species of moth

Alloclemensia unifasciata is a moth of the family Incurvariidae. It is found in Japan on the islands of Hokkaido, Honshu and Kyushu.

The wingspan is 7.5–9.5 mm for males and 8–10 mm for females.
