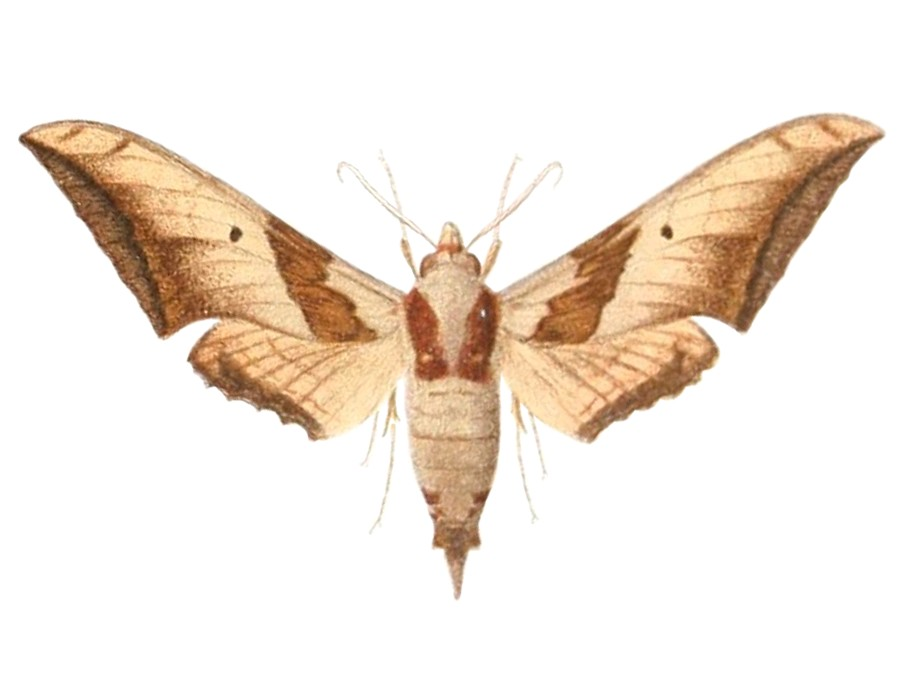

Scientific classification
- Kingdom: Animalia
- Phylum: Arthropoda
- Class: Insecta
- Order: Lepidoptera
- Family: Sphingidae
- Genus: Ambulyx
- Species: A. japonica

Binomial name
- Ambulyx japonica Rothschild, 1894

Synonyms
- Oxyambulyx japonica angustifasciata Okano, 1959

= Ambulyx japonica =

Species of moth

Ambulyx japonica is a species of moth of the family Sphingidae first described by Walter Rothschild in 1894. It is known from eastern China, Korea, Japan and Taiwan.

== Description ==
The wingspan is 81–90 mm.

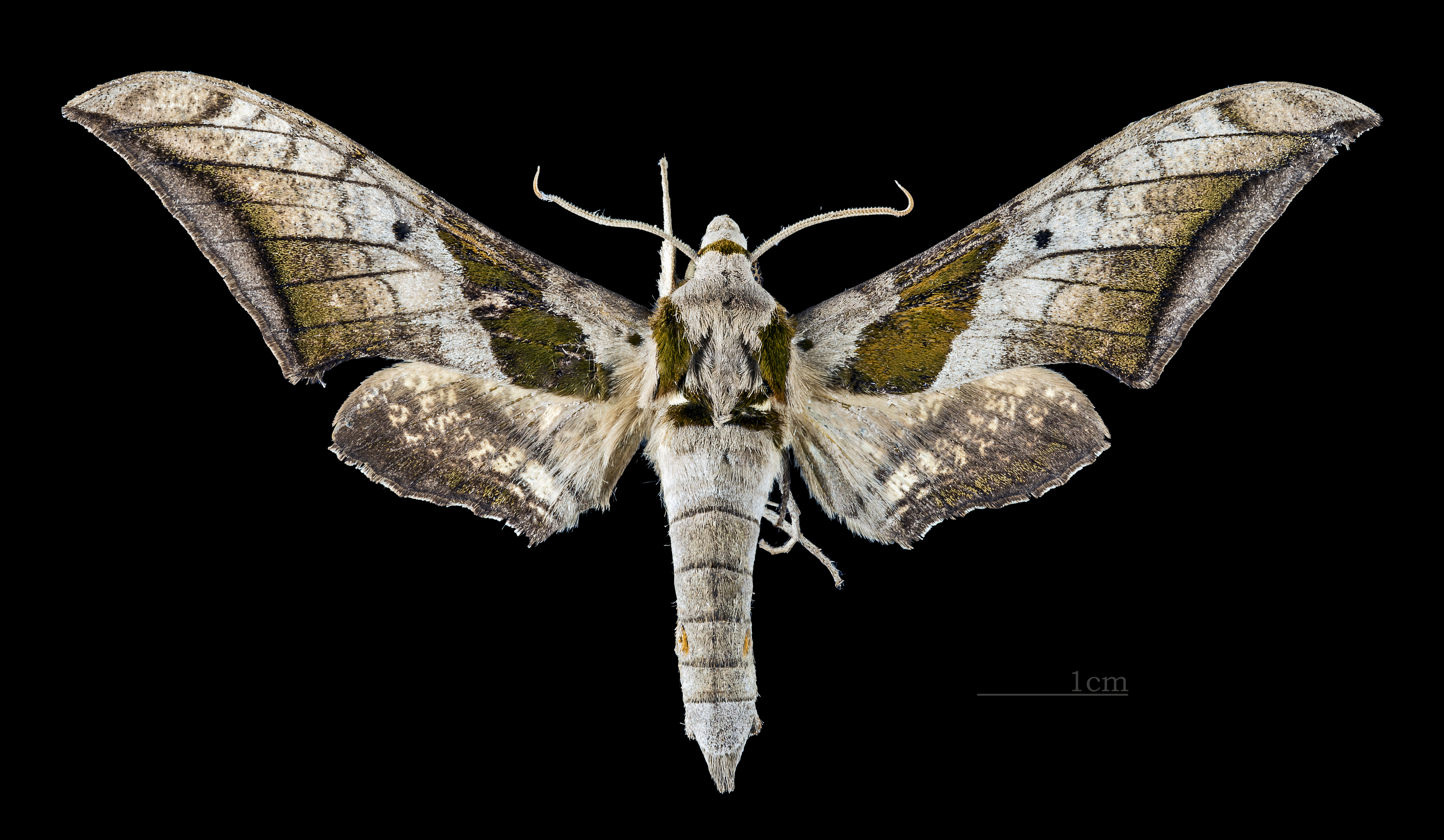
Ambulyx japonica japonica dorsal view

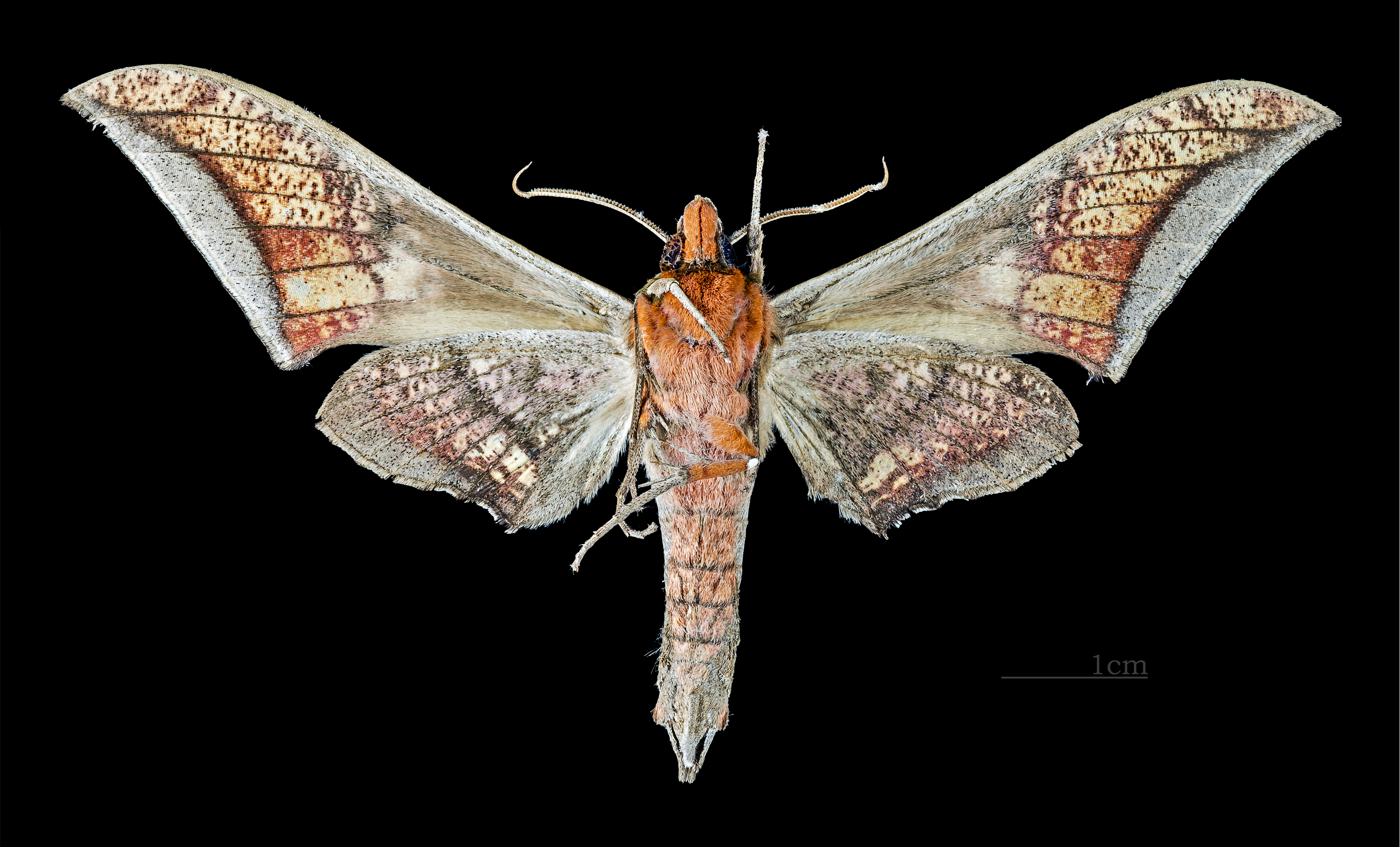
Ambulyx japonica japonica ventral view

== Biology ==
The larvae have been recorded feeding on Aceraceae species in China. In Japan, larvae have been recorded on Acer and Carpinus japonica. Furthermore, larvae have been reared on Carpinus laxiflora and Carpinus tschonoskii.

== Subspecies ==
- Ambulyx japonica japonica (Japan)
- Ambulyx japonica angustifasciata (Okano, 1959) (Taiwan)
- Ambulyx japonica koreana Inoue, 1993 (Korea and eastern China)
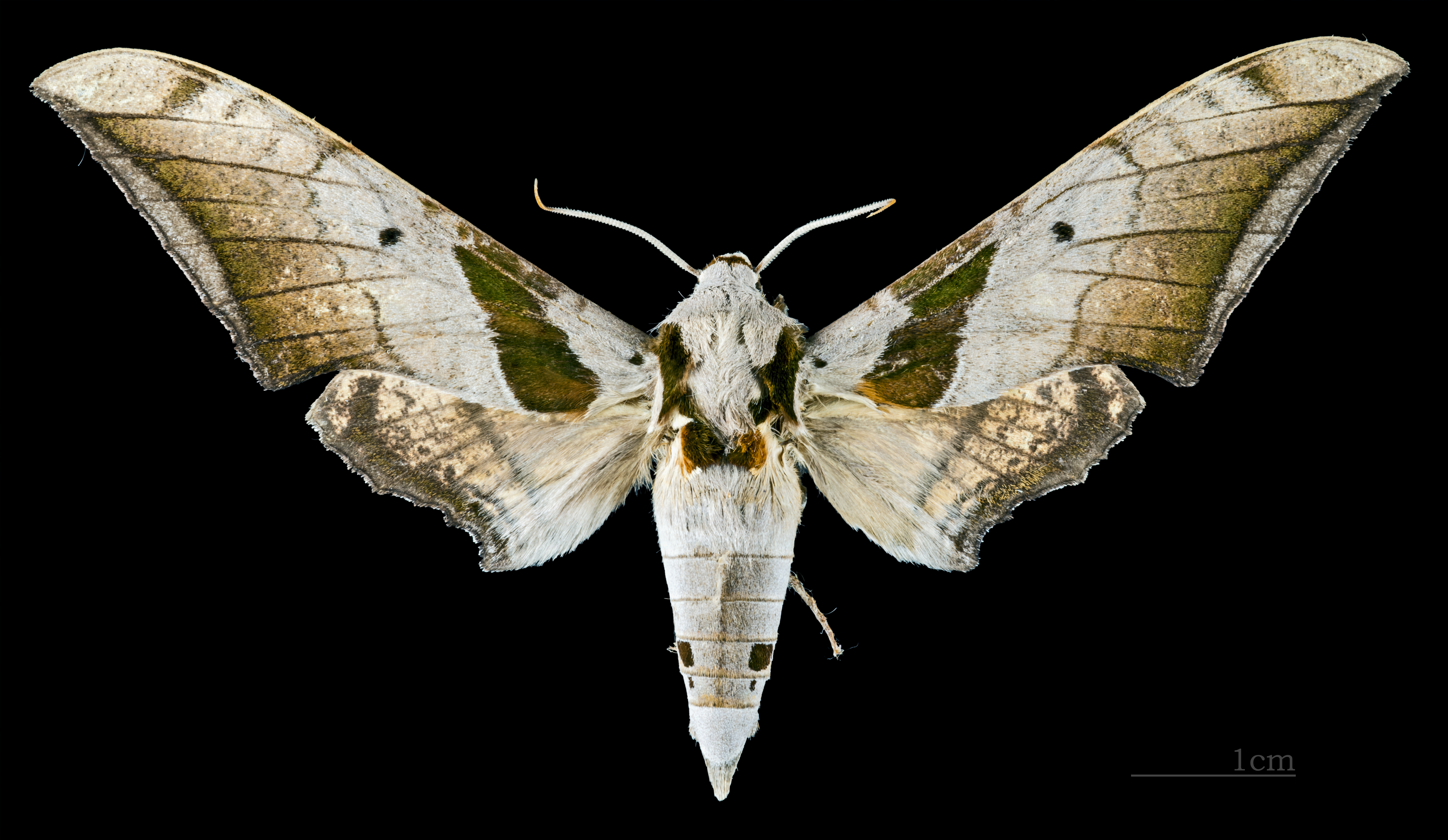
Ambulyx japonica angustifasciata dorsal view

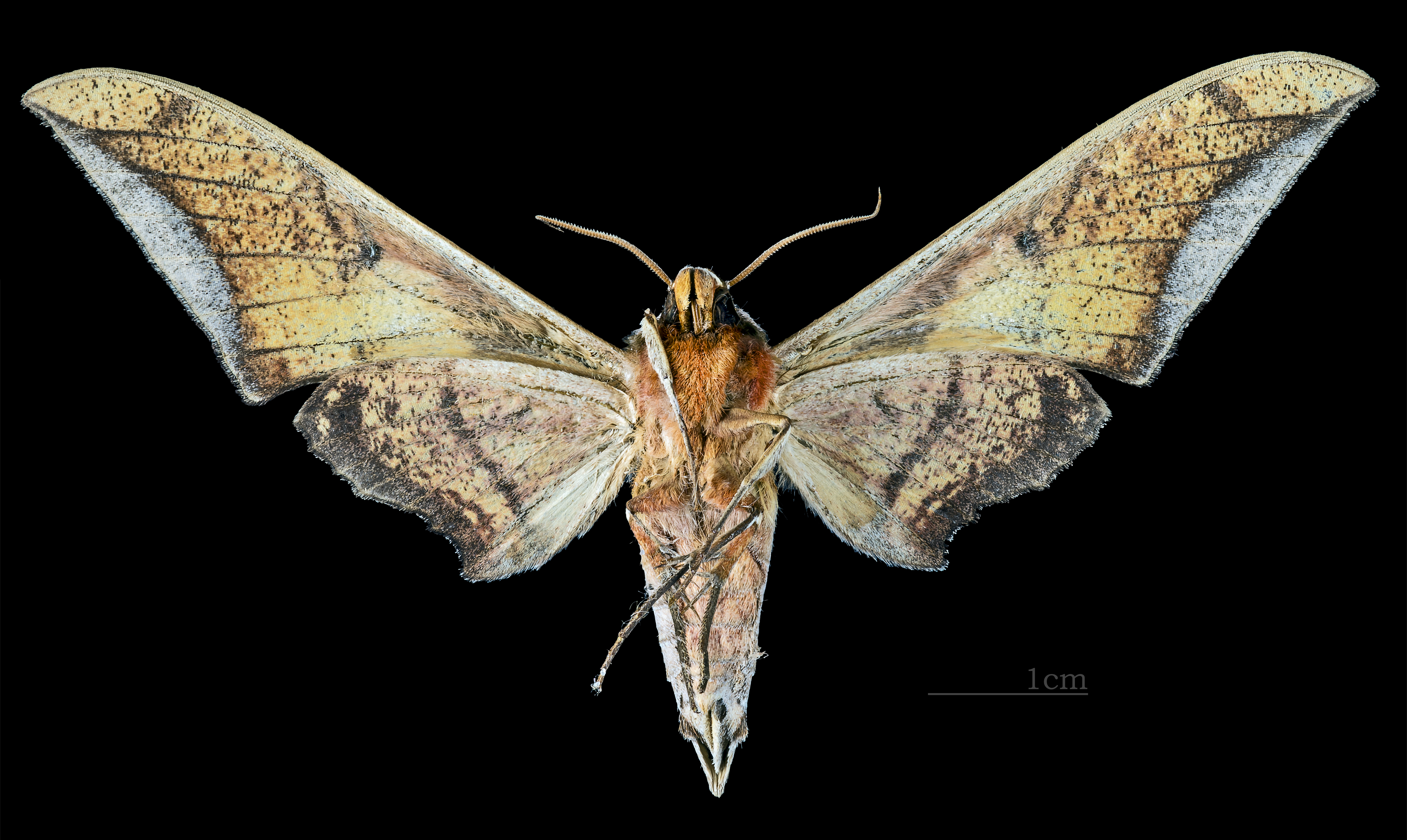
Ambulyx japonica angustifasciata ventral view
