= Paraclemensia cyanella =

Scientific classification
- Kingdom: Animalia
- Phylum: Arthropoda
- Clade: Pancrustacea
- Class: Insecta
- Order: Lepidoptera
- Family: Incurvariidae
- Genus: Paraclemensia
- Species: P. cyanella

Binomial name
- Paraclemensia cyanella (Zeller, 1850)

Synonyms
- Adela cyanella Zeller, 1850; Paraclemensia europaea Davis, 1974

Species of moth

Paraclemensia cyanella is a moth of the family Incurvariidae. It is found in France, Italy, Austria and Russia.

The wingspan is about 13.5 mm.

The larvae feed on Acer campestre and Acer monspessulanum.

Its flight period is from April to June.
