= Vespina nielseni =

Scientific classification
- Domain: Eukaryota
- Kingdom: Animalia
- Phylum: Arthropoda
- Class: Insecta
- Order: Lepidoptera
- Family: Incurvariidae
- Genus: Vespina
- Species: V. nielseni

Binomial name
- Vespina nielseni Kozlov, 1987

Species of moth

Vespina nielseni is a moth of the family Incurvariidae. It is found in Japan (Hokkaido, Honshu, Shikoku, Kyushu) and the Russian Far East.

The wingspan is 8–11 mm. The forewings are narrow and brown to ochre in colour.

The larvae feed on the leaves of Quercus aliena, Quercus serrata and Quercus acutissima.
