= Paraclemensia monospina =

Scientific classification
- Kingdom: Animalia
- Phylum: Arthropoda
- Class: Insecta
- Order: Lepidoptera
- Family: Incurvariidae
- Genus: Paraclemensia
- Species: P. monospina

Binomial name
- Paraclemensia monospina Nielsen, 1982

Species of moth

Paraclemensia monospina is a moth of the family Incurvariidae. It is found on Hokkaido island in Japan.

The wingspan is 11 mm for males and 11.5 mm for females. The forewings are dark brown with a bronzy lustre.

The larvae feed on Sorbus alnifolia. They create an irregular rectangular case.
