= Paraclemensia cyanea =

Scientific classification
- Kingdom: Animalia
- Phylum: Arthropoda
- Class: Insecta
- Order: Lepidoptera
- Family: Incurvariidae
- Genus: Paraclemensia
- Species: P. cyanea

Binomial name
- Paraclemensia cyanea Nielsen, 1982

Species of moth

Paraclemensia cyanea is a moth of the family Incurvariidae. It is found on the main island (Honshu) of Japan.

The wingspan is 12 mm. The forewings are dark brown with a metallic blue lustre.

The larvae possibly feed on Betula platyphylla var. japonica.
