= Leafcutter =

Leafcutter may refer to:

== Insects ==
- Leafcutter ant (see list of leafcutter ants)
- Megachile, bee genus
- Coelioxys rufitarsis, bee species
- Elophila obliteralis, moth species
- Paraclemensia acerifoliella, moth species
- Parapoynx allionealis, moth species

== People ==
- Leafcutter John
