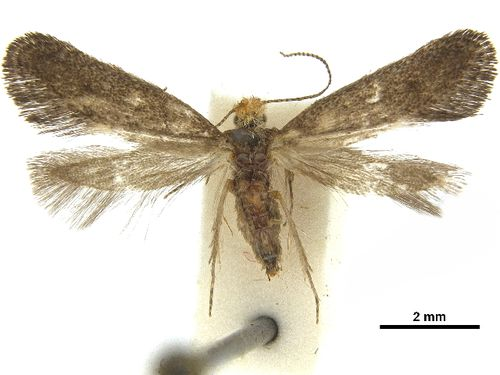

Scientific classification
- Kingdom: Animalia
- Phylum: Arthropoda
- Clade: Pancrustacea
- Class: Insecta
- Order: Lepidoptera
- Family: Incurvariidae
- Genus: Vespina
- Species: V. quercivora

Binomial name
- Vespina quercivora (Davis, 1972)

Synonyms
- Careospina quercivora Davis, 1972

= Vespina quercivora =

Species of moth

Vespina quercivora is a moth of the family Incurvariidae. It is found in California.

The wingspan is 7–9 mm for males and 7–10 mm for females.

The larvae feed on Quercus agrifolia. Young larvae mine the leaves of their host plant.
