= Plesiozela =

Scientific classification
- Kingdom: Animalia
- Phylum: Arthropoda
- Clade: Pancrustacea
- Class: Insecta
- Order: Lepidoptera
- Family: Incurvariidae
- Genus: Plesiozela; Karsholt & Kristensen, 2003

Type species
- Plesiozela nielseni Karsholt & Kristensen, 2003

Species
- Plesiozela nielseni Karsholt & Kristensen, 2003; Plesiozela patagonica Karsholt & Kristensen, 2003

Genus of moths

Plesiozela is genus of moths in the family Incurvariidae. It was described by Ole Karsholt and Niels P. Kristensen in 2003 and initially placed in the family Heliozelidae.

== Species ==
This genus includes the following species:

- Plesiozela nielseni Karsholt & Kristensen, 2003 – Argentina, Chile
- Plesiozela patagonica Karsholt & Kristensen, 2003 – Argentina
