= Phylloporia latipennella =

Scientific classification
- Kingdom: Animalia
- Phylum: Arthropoda
- Clade: Pancrustacea
- Class: Insecta
- Order: Lepidoptera
- Family: Incurvariidae
- Genus: Phylloporia
- Species: P. latipennella

Binomial name
- Phylloporia latipennella Zeller, 1877

Species of moth

Phylloporia latipennella is a moth of the family Incurvariidae. It was described by Zeller in 1877. It is found in South America.
