= Protaephagus =

Scientific classification
- Kingdom: Animalia
- Phylum: Arthropoda
- Clade: Pancrustacea
- Class: Insecta
- Order: Lepidoptera
- Family: Incurvariidae
- Genus: Protaephagus; Scoble, 1980

Genus of moths

Protaephagus is a genus of moths of the family Incurvariidae.

== Selected species ==
- Protaephagus capensis Scoble, 1980
