= Perthida pentaspila =

Scientific classification
- Domain: Eukaryota
- Kingdom: Animalia
- Phylum: Arthropoda
- Class: Insecta
- Order: Lepidoptera
- Family: Incurvariidae
- Genus: Perthida
- Species: P. pentaspila

Binomial name
- Perthida pentaspila (Meyrick, 1916)

Synonyms
- Tinea pentaspila Meyrick, 1916

Species of moth

Perthida pentaspila is a moth of the family Incurvariidae. It was described by Edward Meyrick in 1916. It is found in Victoria.
