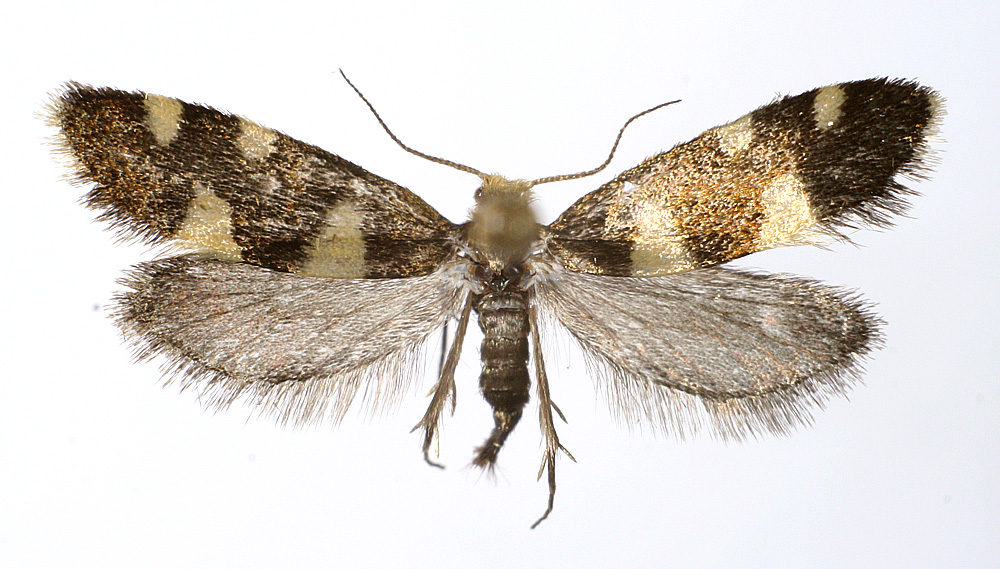

Scientific classification
- Kingdom: Animalia
- Phylum: Arthropoda
- Class: Insecta
- Order: Lepidoptera
- Family: Incurvariidae
- Genus: Alloclemensia; Nielsen, 1981

= Alloclemensia =

Genus of imoths

Alloclemensia is a genus of moths of the family Incurvariidae.

== Selected species ==
- Alloclemensia americana Nielsen, 1981
- Alloclemensia devotella (Rebel, 1893)
- Alloclemensia maculata Nielsen, 1981
- Alloclemensia mesospilella (Herrich-Schaffer, 1854)
- Alloclemensia minima Kozlov, 1987
- Alloclemensia unifasciata Nielsen, 1981
