= Paraclemensia =

Scientific classification
- Kingdom: Animalia
- Phylum: Arthropoda
- Clade: Pancrustacea
- Class: Insecta
- Order: Lepidoptera
- Family: Incurvariidae
- Genus: Paraclemensia; Busck, 1904

Synonyms
- Brackenridgia Busck, 1903 (preocc. Eigenmann & Ulrich, 1902)

Genus of moths

Paraclemensia is a genus of moths of the family Incurvariidae.

== Species ==
- Paraclemensia acerifoliella (Fitch, 1854)
- Paraclemensia caerulea (Issiki, 1957)
- Paraclemensia cyanea Nielsen, 1982
- Paraclemensia cyanella (Zeller, 1850)
- Paraclemensia incerta (Christoph, 1882)
- Paraclemensia monospina Nielsen, 1982
- Paraclemensia oligospina Nielsen, 1982
- Paraclemensia viridis Nielsen, 1982
