= Vespina =

Scientific classification
- Kingdom: Animalia
- Phylum: Arthropoda
- Class: Insecta
- Order: Lepidoptera
- Family: Incurvariidae
- Genus: Vespina; Davis, 1972

Synonyms
- Careospina Davis, 1972 (preocc. Peters, 1971)

Genus of moths

Vespina is a genus of moths of the family Incurvariidae.

== Selected species ==
- Vespina nielseni Kozlov, 1987
- Vespina quercivora (Davis, 1972)
- Vespina slovaciella (Zagulajev & Tokar, 1990)
