= Simacauda =

Scientific classification
- Kingdom: Animalia
- Phylum: Arthropoda
- Class: Insecta
- Order: Lepidoptera
- Family: Incurvariidae
- Genus: Simacauda; Nielsen & Davis, 1981

Type species
- Lampronia dicommatias Meyrick, 1931

Genus of moths

Simacauda is a genus of moths in the family Incurvariidae.

== Species ==
The genus contains the following species:

- Simacauda dicommatias
- Simicauda heliocephala
- Simacauda virescens
