= Procacitas =

Scientific classification
- Kingdom: Animalia
- Phylum: Arthropoda
- Class: Insecta
- Order: Lepidoptera
- Family: Incurvariidae
- Genus: Procacitas; Kuprijanov, 1992
- Species: P. orientella

Binomial name
- Procacitas orientella (Kozlov, 1987)

Synonyms
- Alloclemensia orientella Kozlov, 1987

Genus of moths

Procacitas is a genus of moths of the family Incurvariidae. It contains only one species, Procacitas orientella, which is found in Japan (Hokkaido, Honshu, Shikoku), Russia (Sakhalin, Irkutsk, Primorye) and North Korea.

The wingspan is 13–14 mm for males and 11.5–15 mm for females.
