= Perthida =

Scientific classification
- Domain: Eukaryota
- Kingdom: Animalia
- Phylum: Arthropoda
- Class: Insecta
- Order: Lepidoptera
- Family: Incurvariidae
- Genus: Perthida; Common, 1969

Genus of moths

Perthida is a genus of moths of the family Incurvariidae.

== Species ==
- Perthida glyphopa Common, 1969
- Perthida pentaspila (Meyrick, 1916)
- Perthida phoenicopa (Meyrick, 1893)
- Perthida tetraspila (Lower, 1905)
