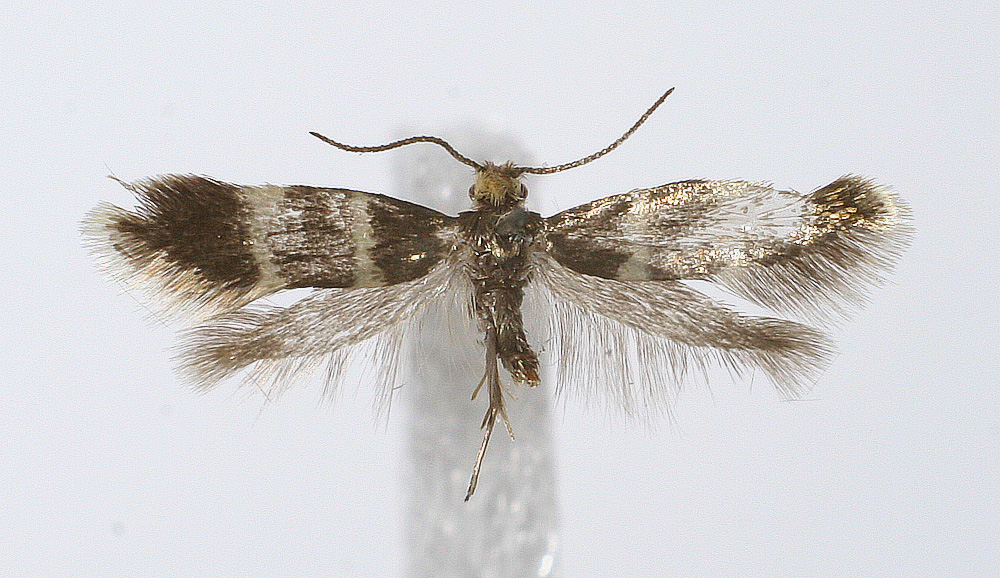
- Phylloporia bistrigella

Scientific classification
- Kingdom: Animalia
- Phylum: Arthropoda
- Clade: Pancrustacea
- Class: Insecta
- Order: Lepidoptera
- Family: Incurvariidae
- Genus: Phylloporia; Heinemann, 1870

= Phylloporia (moth) =

Genus of moths

Phylloporia is a genus of moths of the family Incurvariidae.

== Selected species ==
- Phylloporia bistrigella (Haworth, 1828)
- Phylloporia latipennella Zeller, 1877
