= Perthida glyphopa =

Scientific classification
- Kingdom: Animalia
- Phylum: Arthropoda
- Class: Insecta
- Order: Lepidoptera
- Family: Incurvariidae
- Genus: Perthida
- Species: P. glyphopa

Binomial name
- Perthida glyphopa Common, 1969

Species of moth

Perthida glyphopa, the Western Australian jarrah leafminer, is a moth of the family Incurvariidae. It was described by Ian Francis Bell Common in 1969 and is known from southwestern Australia.

The larvae feed on Eucalyptus marginata and Eucalyptus rudis. They mine the leaves of their host plant.
