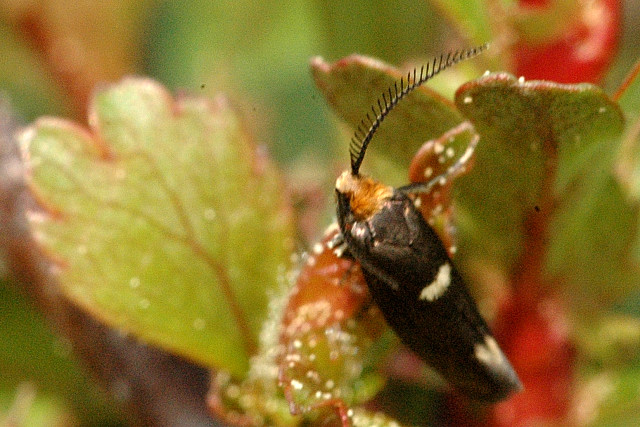
- Male
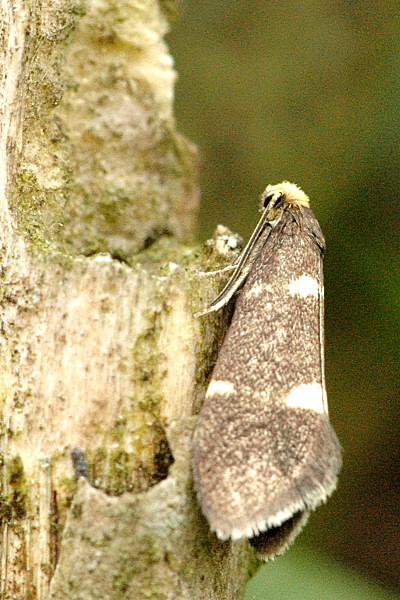
- Female

Scientific classification
- Domain: Eukaryota
- Kingdom: Animalia
- Phylum: Arthropoda
- Class: Insecta
- Order: Lepidoptera
- Family: Incurvariidae
- Genus: Incurvaria
- Species: I. masculella

Binomial name
- Incurvaria masculella (Denis & Schiffermüller, 1775)

Synonyms
- Tinea masculella Denis & Schiffermuller, 1775

= Incurvaria masculella =

Feathered diamond-back

Species of moth

Incurvaria masculella, the feathered leaf-cutter, is a moth of the family Incurvariidae. It is widespread in Europe.

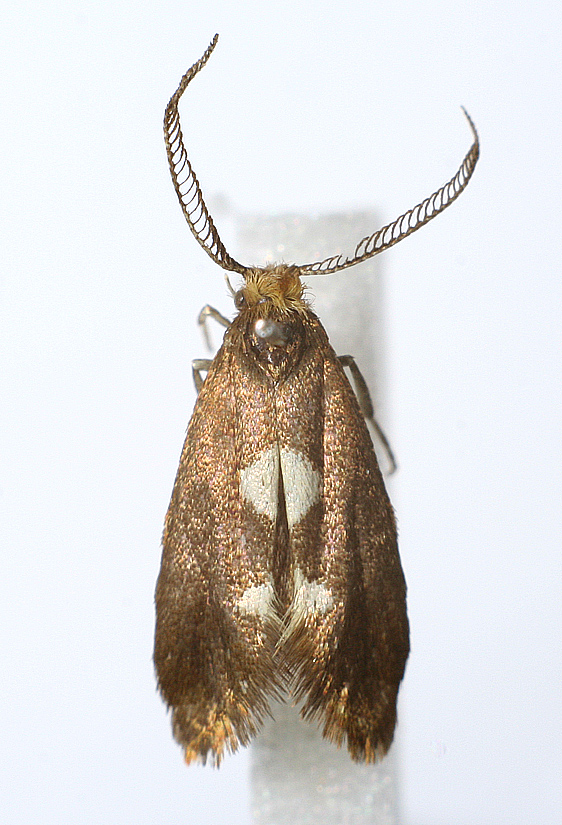
Mounted

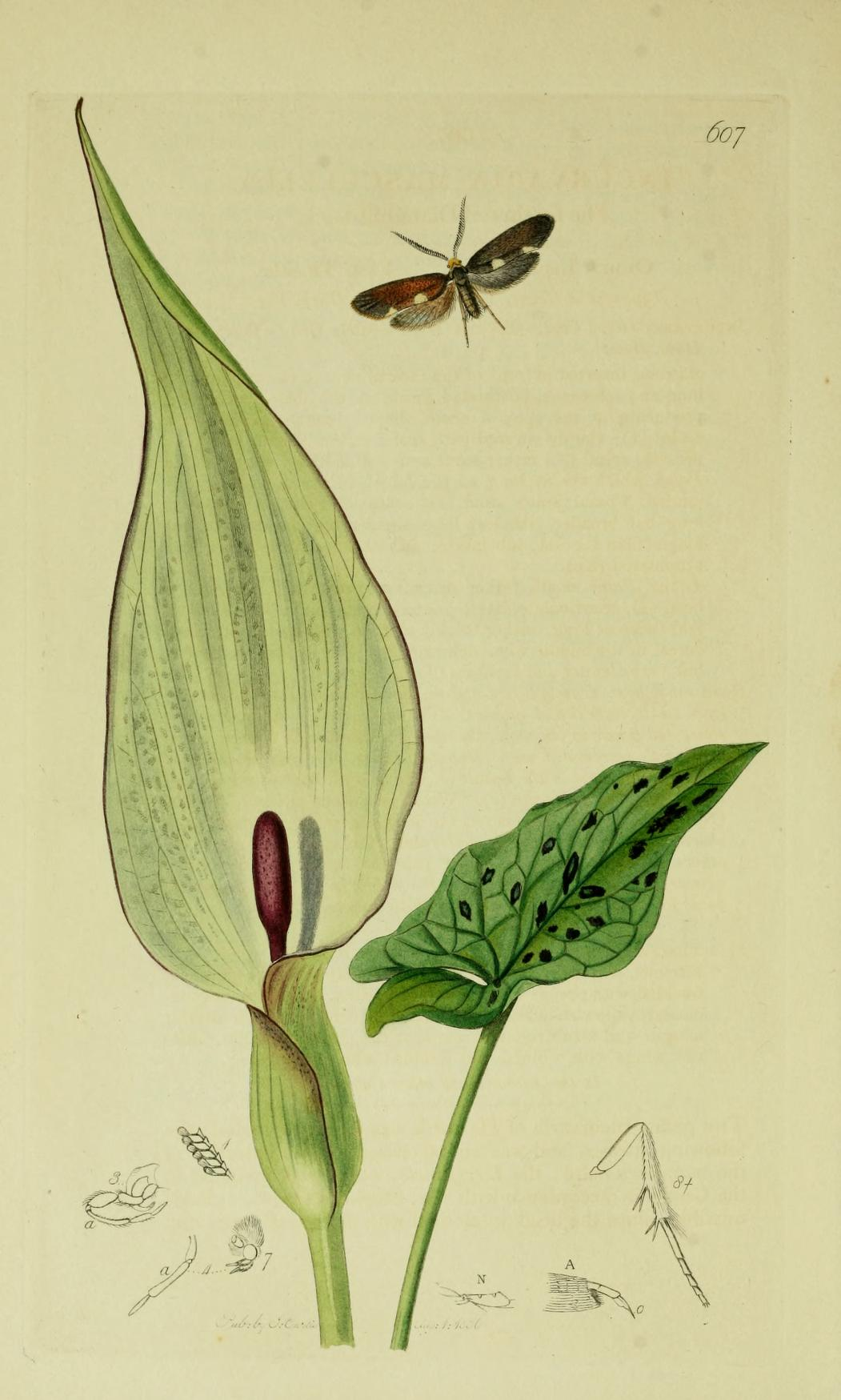
Illustration from John Curtis's British Entomology Volume 6

The wingspan is 12–16 mm. Head pale ochreous, ferruginous-tinged. Forewings rather dark purplish bronzy-fuscous; a whitish triangular dorsal spot before middle, and a smaller one before tornus. Hindwings rather dark grey.

In Belgium, the moth flies from April to May; in May in the British Isles.

The larvae feed on Crataegus and various deciduous trees and bushes, including roses, Malus domestica, Prunus mahaleb, oak, sweet chestnut, Corylus avellana, Tilia, Carpinus betulus, and Vaccinium.
