= Subclemensia =

Scientific classification
- Domain: Eukaryota
- Kingdom: Animalia
- Phylum: Arthropoda
- Class: Insecta
- Order: Lepidoptera
- Family: Incurvariidae
- Genus: Subclemensia; Kozlov, 1987

Genus of moths

Subclemensia is a genus of moths of the family Incurvariidae.

== Selected species ==
- Subclemensia taigae Kozlov, 1987
