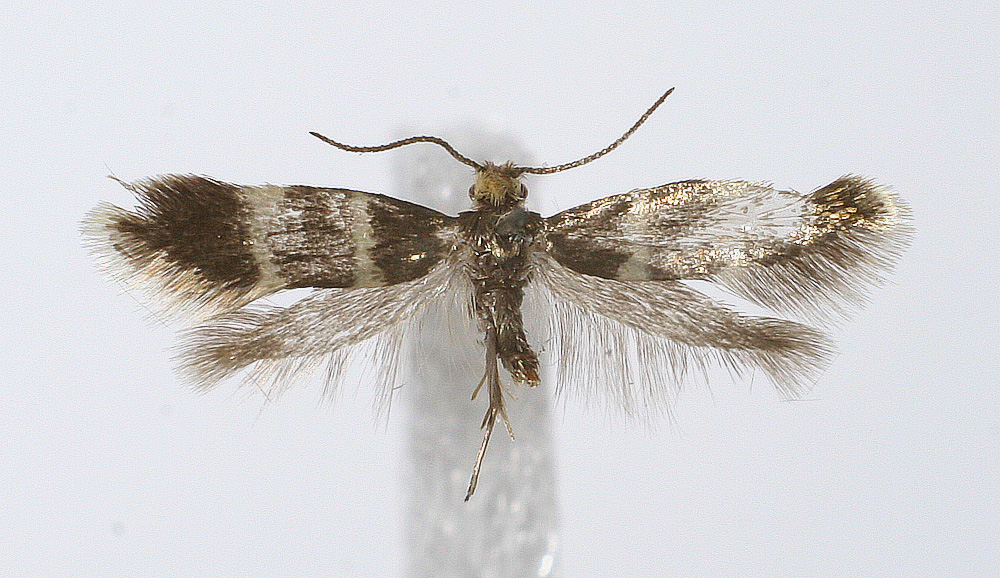

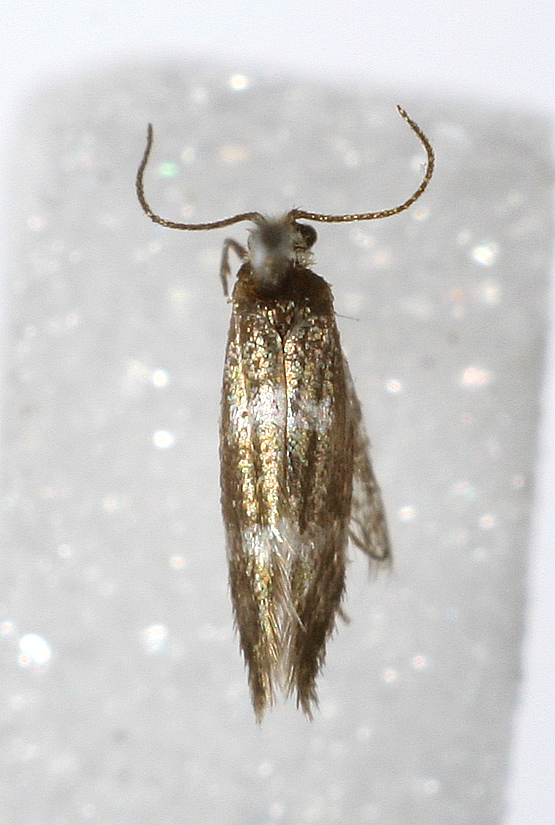

Scientific classification
- Kingdom: Animalia
- Phylum: Arthropoda
- Clade: Pancrustacea
- Class: Insecta
- Order: Lepidoptera
- Family: Incurvariidae
- Genus: Phylloporia
- Species: P. bistrigella

Binomial name
- Phylloporia bistrigella (Haworth, 1828)

Synonyms
- Tinea bistrigella Haworth, 1828; Phylloporia abalienella (Zetterstedt, 1840); Phylloporia subammanella (Stainton, 1849); Phylloporia dilorella (Herrich-Schäffer, 1851); Phylloporia labradorella (Clemens, 1864); Phylloporia labradoriella (Walsingham, 1888) (missp.); Phylloporia aureovireus (Dietz, 1905)

= Phylloporia bistrigella =

Species of moth

Phylloporia bistrigella is a moth of the family Incurvariidae. It is found in western, northern and central Europe and north-eastern North America.

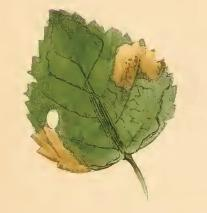
A birch leaf mined by two larvae, one of which has already cut out its case and departed

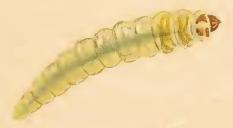
Larva

The wingspan is 7–9 mm.7-8 nnn. Head ochreous -fuscous. Forewings fuscous; a straight shining whitish fascia at 1/3, and another sometimes interrupted beyond middle; sometimes a whitish elongate discal spot beyond this. Hindwings grey.

The larvae feed on Betula species. They mine the leaves of their host plant.
