= Basileura =

Scientific classification
- Kingdom: Animalia
- Phylum: Arthropoda
- Class: Insecta
- Order: Lepidoptera
- Family: Incurvariidae
- Genus: Basileura; Nielsen & Davis, 1981
- Species: B. elongata

Binomial name
- Basileura elongata Nielsen & Davis, 1981

Genus of moths

Basileura is a monotypic moth genus of the family Incurvariidae erected by Ebbe Nielsen and Donald R. Davis in 1981. Its only species, Basileura elongata, described by the same authors in the same year, is found in Argentina.
