= Perthida phoenicopa =

Scientific classification
- Kingdom: Animalia
- Phylum: Arthropoda
- Class: Insecta
- Order: Lepidoptera
- Family: Incurvariidae
- Genus: Perthida
- Species: P. phoenicopa

Binomial name
- Perthida phoenicopa (Meyrick, 1893)

Synonyms
- Tinea phoenicopa Meyrick, 1893

Species of moth

Perthida phoenicopa is a moth of the family Incurvariidae. It was described by Edward Meyrick in 1893, and is known from New South Wales and South Australia.
