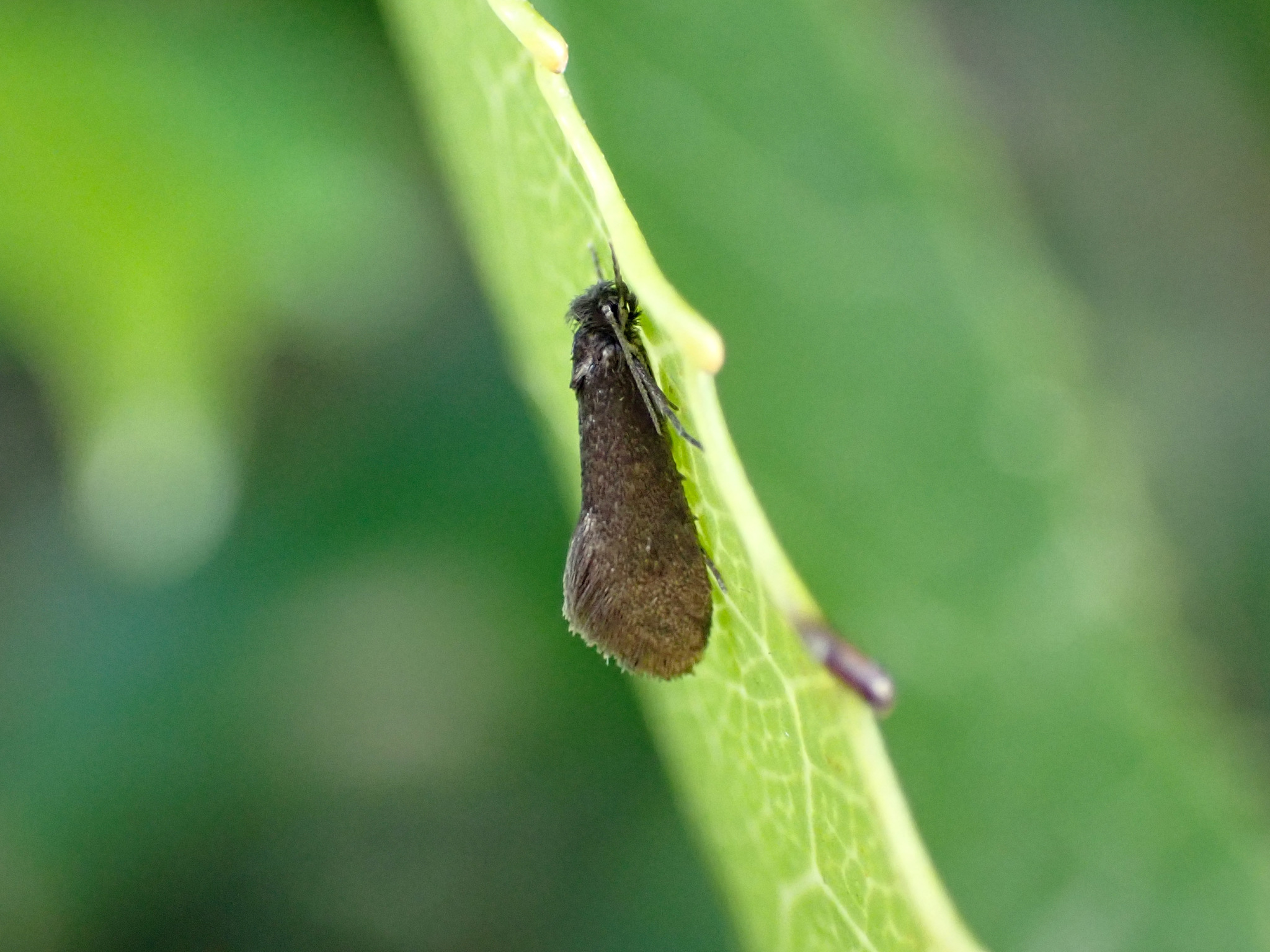
- Living specimen

Scientific classification
- Domain: Eukaryota
- Kingdom: Animalia
- Phylum: Arthropoda
- Class: Insecta
- Order: Lepidoptera
- Family: Psychidae
- Genus: Rhathamictis
- Species: R. nocturna

Binomial name
- Rhathamictis nocturna (Clarke, 1926)

Synonyms
- Mallobathra nocturna Clarke, 1926

= Rhathamictis nocturna =

Species of moth

Rhathamictis nocturna is a moth of the Psychidae family. This species was described by Charles Edwin Clarke in 1926. It is endemic to New Zealand and has been collected in the Auckland region. Larvae of this species build small protective cases in which they hide and from which they feed. Adults have been observed on the wing in November and January.

== Taxonomy ==
This species was first described by Charles E. Clarke in 1926 using specimens collected at Kauri Gully, Auckland in January and named Mallobathra nocturna. In 1988 J. S. Dugdale placed this species in the genus Rhathamictis. The male holotype specimen is held at the Auckland War Memorial Museum.

== Description ==
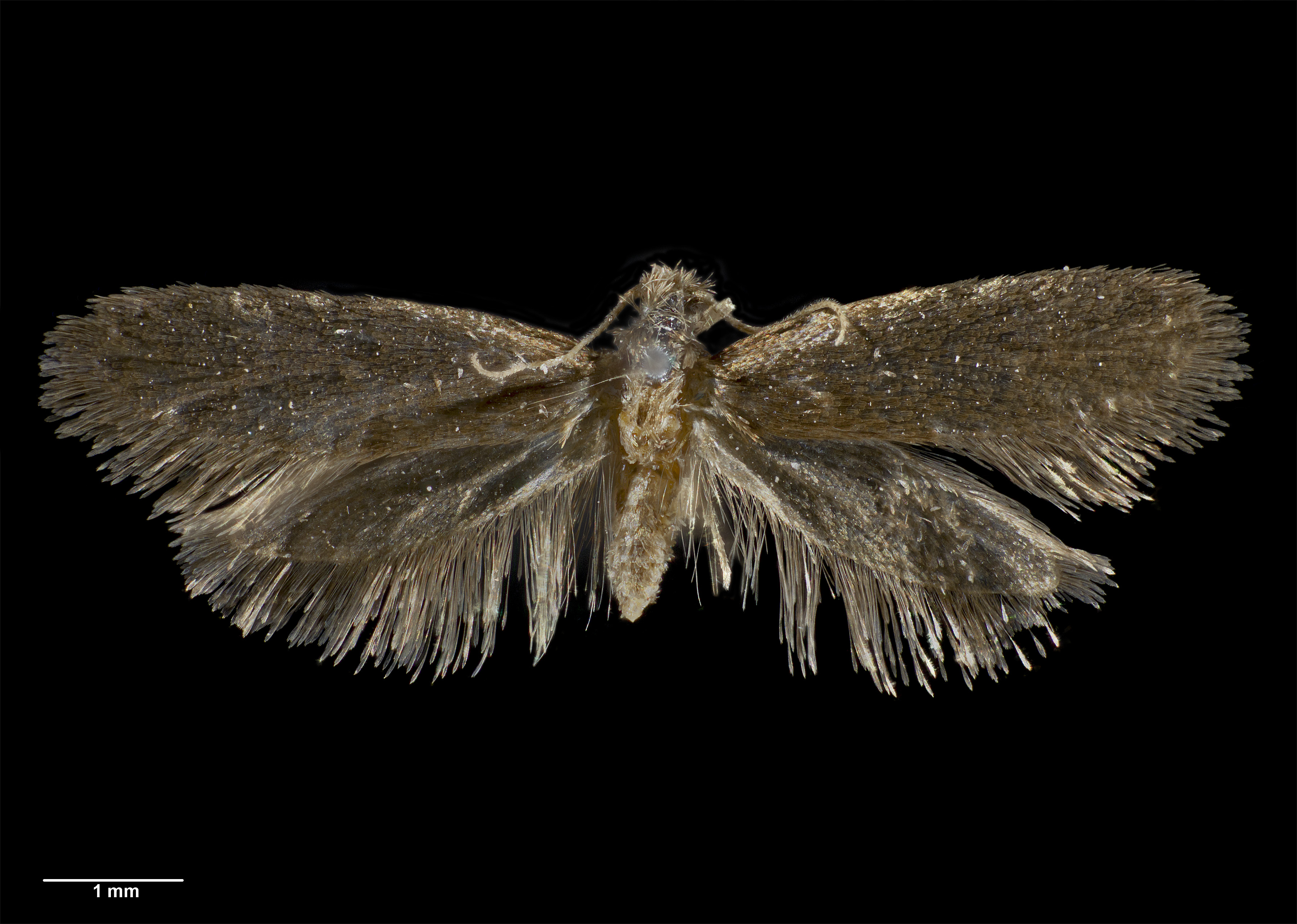
Male holotype.

Clarke described the species as follows:

♂. 8 mm. Head, palpi, and antennae fuscous. Antennal ciliations 2.- Thorax and legs fuscous. Abdomen light fuscous. Forewings elongateoval, costa arched, apex rounded, hind-margin rather rounded; dark fuscous : cilia dark fuscous. Hindwings fuscous : cilia fuscous.

R. nocturna can be distinguished from its sister species R. perspersa as it is smaller and lacks the distinct yellowish forewing speckling of the latter species.

== Distribution ==
R. nocturna is endemic to New Zealand and have been observed in the Auckland region.

== Behaviour ==
Larvae of this species build small protective cases in which they hide and from which they feed. Adults of this species have been observed on the wing in November and January.

== Collecting specimens ==
Clarke stated that he collected the type specimen during the day by beating brushwood. He also explained that he subsequently collected this species in the early morning when the air was extremely moist.
