= Perthida tetraspila =

Scientific classification
- Domain: Eukaryota
- Kingdom: Animalia
- Phylum: Arthropoda
- Class: Insecta
- Order: Lepidoptera
- Family: Incurvariidae
- Genus: Perthida
- Species: P. tetraspila

Binomial name
- Perthida tetraspila Lower, 1905

Synonyms
- Tinea tetraspila Lower, 1905

Species of moth

Perthida tetraspila is a moth of the family Incurvariidae. It was described by Oswald Bertram Lower in 1905. It is found in South Australia and Victoria.
