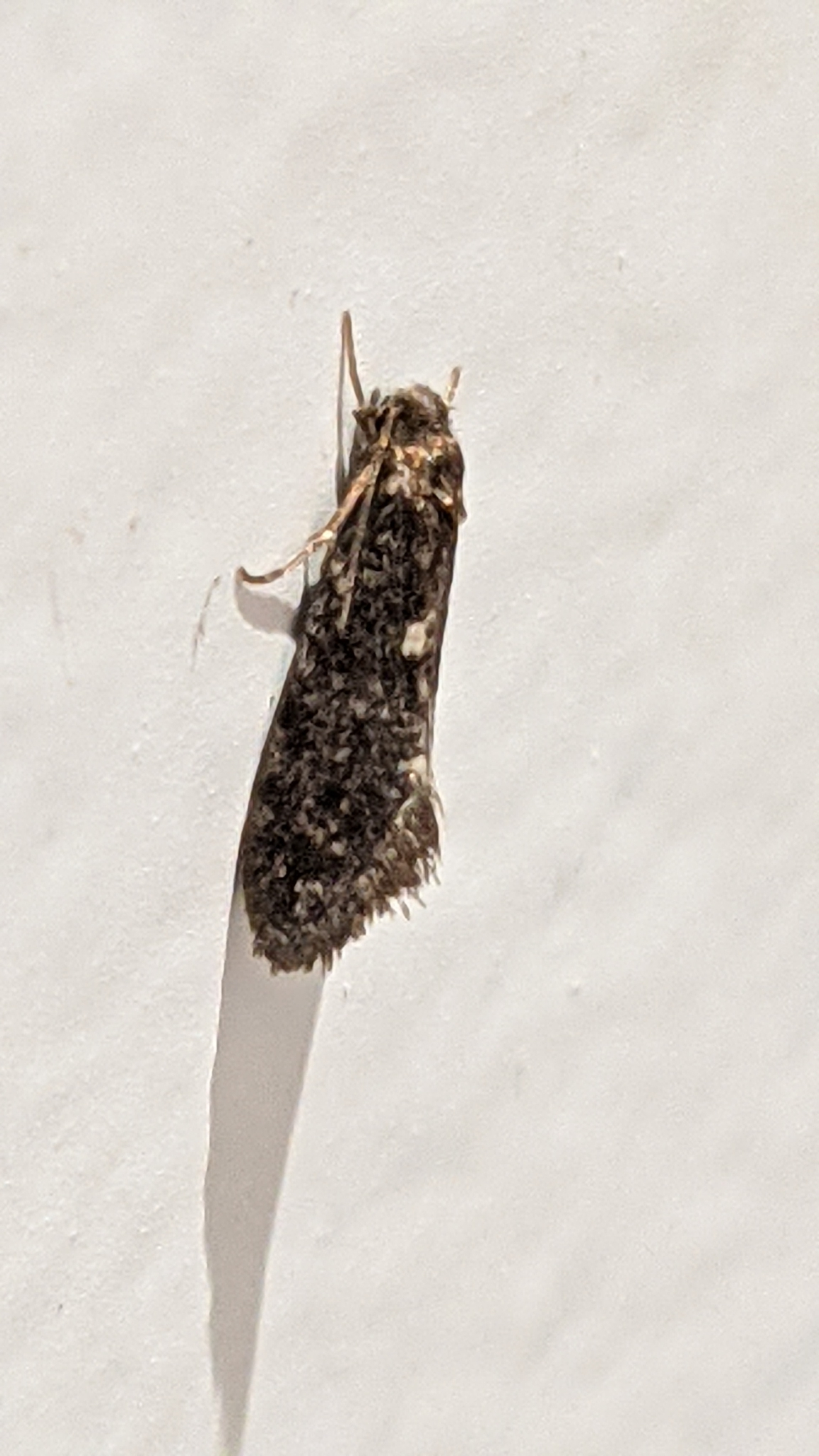
- Observed in Khandallah, Wellington

Scientific classification
- Domain: Eukaryota
- Kingdom: Animalia
- Phylum: Arthropoda
- Class: Insecta
- Order: Lepidoptera
- Family: Psychidae
- Genus: Rhathamictis
- Species: R. perspersa

Binomial name
- Rhathamictis perspersa Meyrick, 1924

= Rhathamictis perspersa =

Species of moth

Rhathamictis perspersa is a moth of the family Psychidae. This species was described by Edward Meyrick in 1924. It is endemic to New Zealand and has been observed in the Wellington region. Larvae of this species build small protective cases in which they hide and feed. The cases are brown and are neat in construction. The larvae live under the loose bark of trees and feed on inert animal matter. The adults have been observed on the wing in February and March.

== Taxonomy ==
R. perspersa was first described by Edward Meyrick in 1924 using a specimen collected at Otari-Wilton's Bush in Wellington by George Hudson in March. Hudson discussed this species and illustrated the male in his 1928 book The butterflies and moths of New Zealand. In 1950 Hudson discussed and illustrated the female of the species. J. S. Dugdale in his 1988 publication Lepidoptera - annotated catalogue, and keys to family-group taxa misspelt the specific epithet as perspera. He also indicated in that publication that the generic assignment in the species' original description was to in the genus Mallobathra, where as Rhathamictis is the correct generic assignment. The male holotype specimen is held at the Natural History Museum, London.

== Description ==
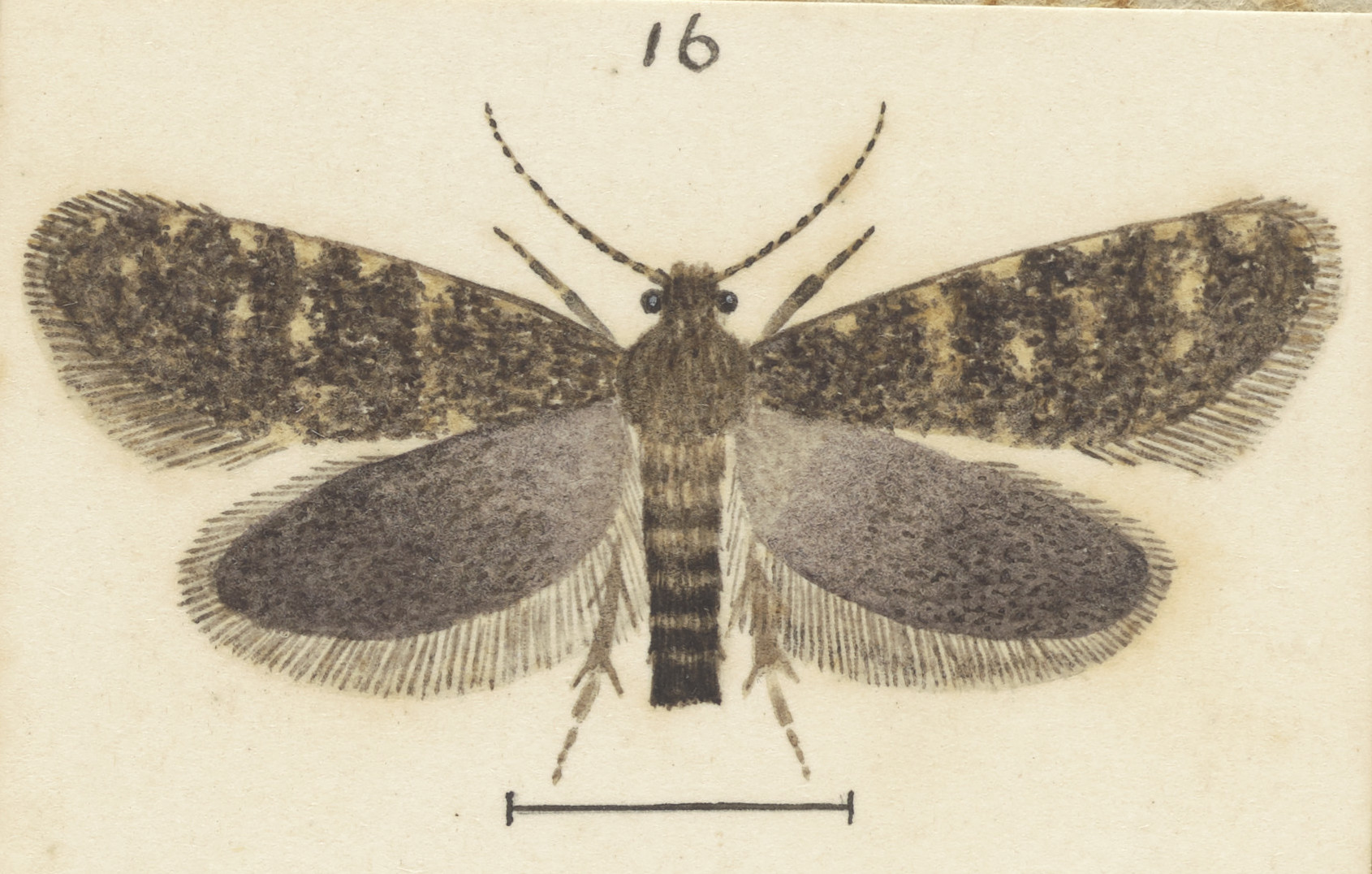
Illustration of male.

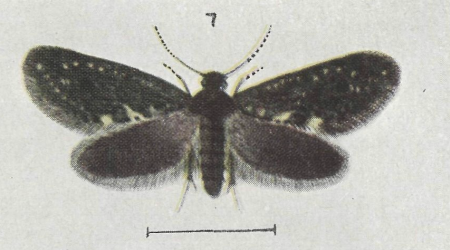
Illustration of female

Meyrick described the male of this species as follows:

♂. 14 mm. Head, palpi, and thorax grey. Forewings elongate, apex rounded-obtuse, termen obliquely rounded; dark purple-grey; scattered whitish-ochreous dots and strigulae—viz., about 7 transverse strigulae from costa, several in disc, a dot at apex, and about 15 small irregular dots in dorsal area: cilia purplish-coppery. Hindwings dark purple; cilia grey.

Hudson described the female of this species from a specimen collected at Gollan's Valley in February, a month earlier than the holotype. His description is as follows:

It is darker and blacker in colour than the male specimen from which the original figure and descriptions were taken. It also has definite, clear whitish-ochreous marks on the dorsum of forewings at 1/3and 2/3. The pale whitish-ochreous dots on the other portions of the wing are rather obscure, and some of them are only visible in certain lights.

Hudson goes on to hypothesise that, as a result of the dates of capture, the holotype specimen may be worn or faded.

== Distribution ==
This species is endemic to New Zealand. It has been collected in the Wellington region. This species is said to be associated with the species Olearia hectorii which is endemic to the South Island.

== Behaviour and life cycle ==
Larvae of this species build small protective cases in which they hide and from which they feed. Adults of this species have been recorded on the wing in February and March.

Little is known of its habits, but according to a study the case-bearing larvae live largely under the loose bark of trees and feed on inert animal matter, either live, such as pupae and the eggs of invertebrates, or animal detritus, such as dead moths. Under such trees the abandoned cases may be numerous, and indicate that the adult eclosion season is late summer and that the species is univoltine. The cases are brown and are neat in construction; the case of the mature larva is about 8 mm in length.
