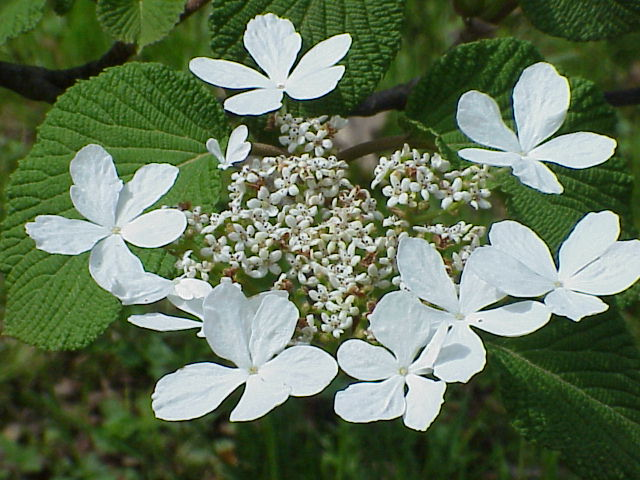

Scientific classification
- Kingdom: Plantae
- Clade: Tracheophytes
- Clade: Angiosperms
- Clade: Eudicots
- Clade: Asterids
- Order: Dipsacales
- Family: Adoxaceae
- Genus: Viburnum
- Species: V. furcatum

Binomial name
- Viburnum furcatum Blume ex Hook.f & Thomson

= Viburnum furcatum =

Species of flowering plant

Viburnum furcatum, the forked viburnum or scarlet leaved viburnum, is a species of flowering plant in the family Adoxaceae (formerly Caprifoliaceae). Growing to 4 m (13 ft) tall and broad, it is a substantial deciduous shrub with rounded oval bronze-green leaves, turning red in autumn. Scented white flower-heads resembling those of lacecap hydrangeas are borne in summer, followed by black fruits.

This plant has gained the Royal Horticultural Society's Award of Garden Merit.

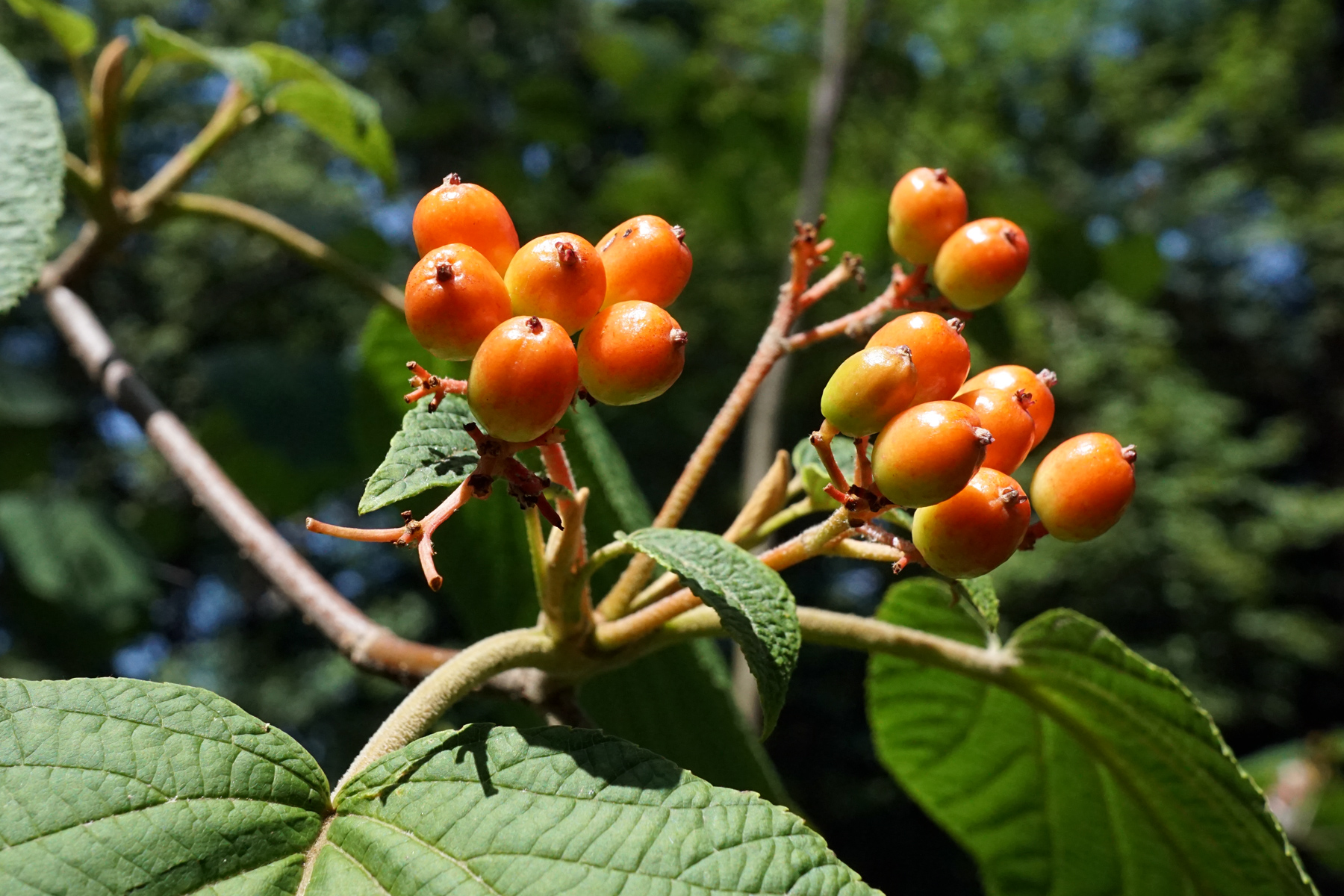
Ripening fruits
