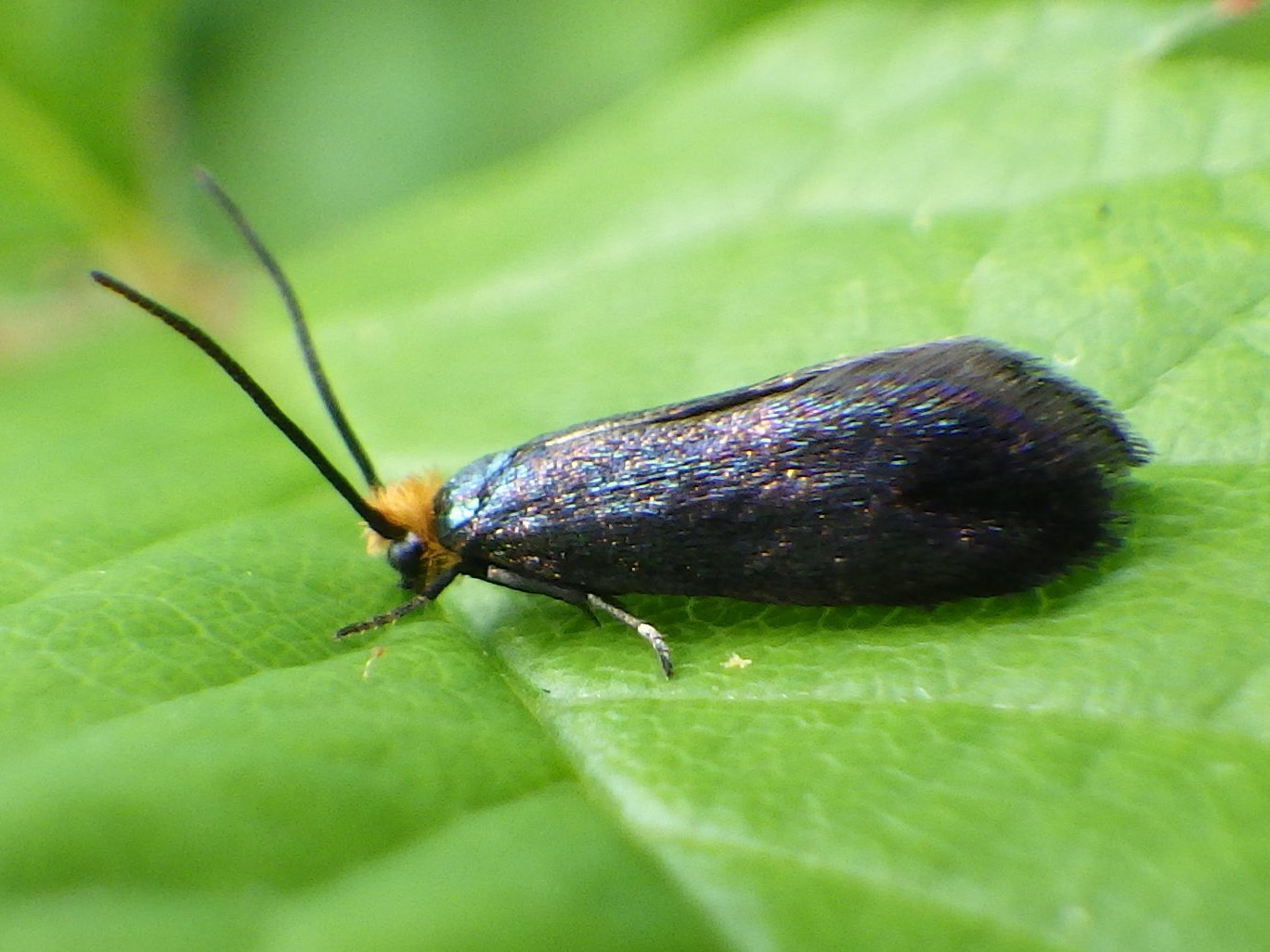

Scientific classification
- Kingdom: Animalia
- Phylum: Arthropoda
- Clade: Pancrustacea
- Class: Insecta
- Order: Lepidoptera
- Family: Incurvariidae
- Genus: Paraclemensia
- Species: P. acerifoliella

Binomial name
- Paraclemensia acerifoliella (Fitch, 1854)

Synonyms
- Ornix acerifoliella Fitch 1856; Micropteryx luteiceps Walker 1863; Paraclemensia luteiceps; Tinea iridella Chambers, 1873; Paraclemensia iridella

= Paraclemensia acerifoliella =

Maple leafcutter moth

Species of moth

Paraclemensia acerifoliella, the maple leafcutter moth, is a moth of the family Incurvariidae. It is found from south-eastern Canada and the north-eastern United States, south to the tip of the Appalachian Mountains in western North Carolina and possibly north-western Georgia.

== Description ==
The wingspan is 9–12 mm. They are on wing from April to June in one generation per year.

The larvae feed on the leaves of Acer and sometimes also Fagus, Quercus, Betula and huckleberry species.

== Gallery ==
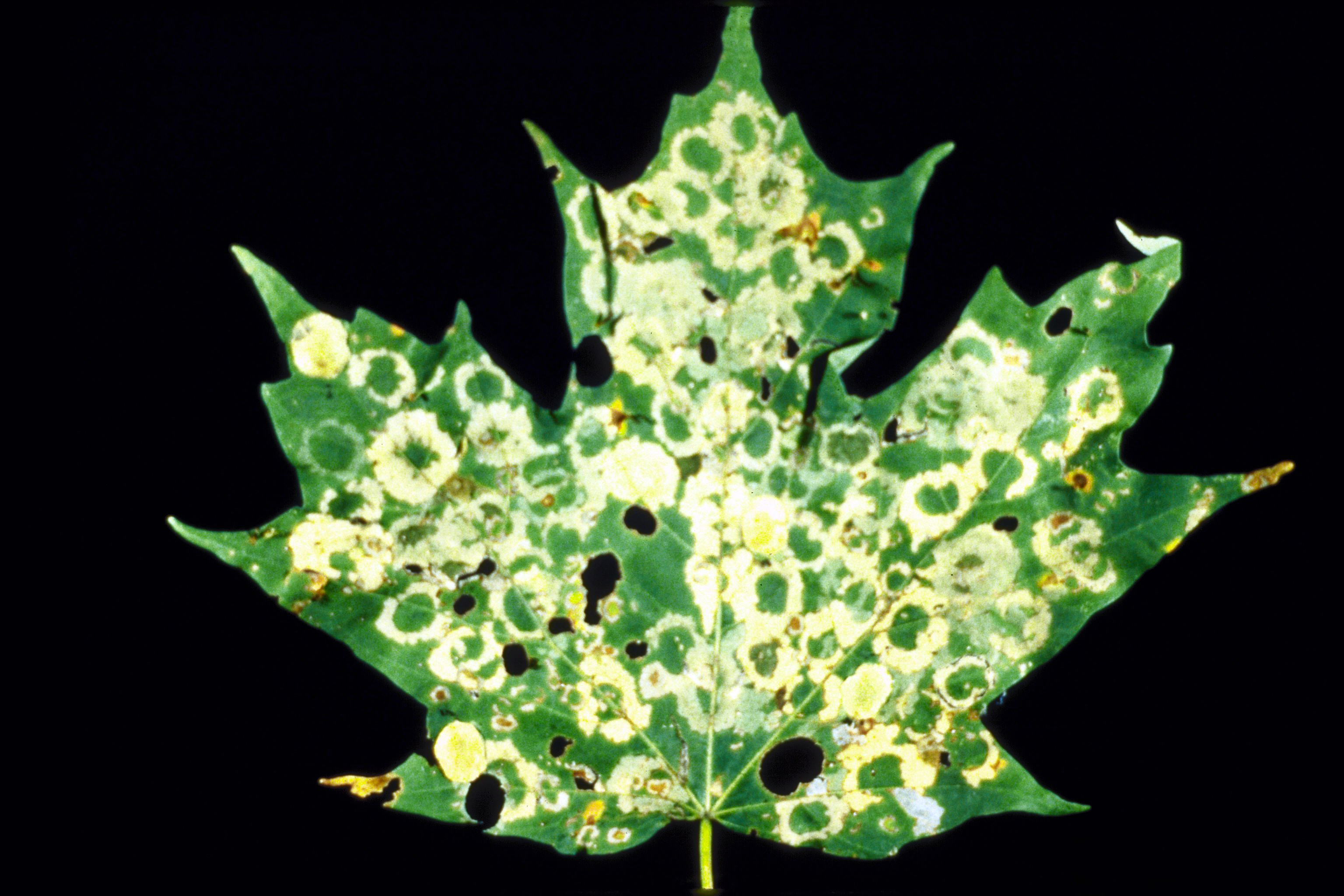
Damage

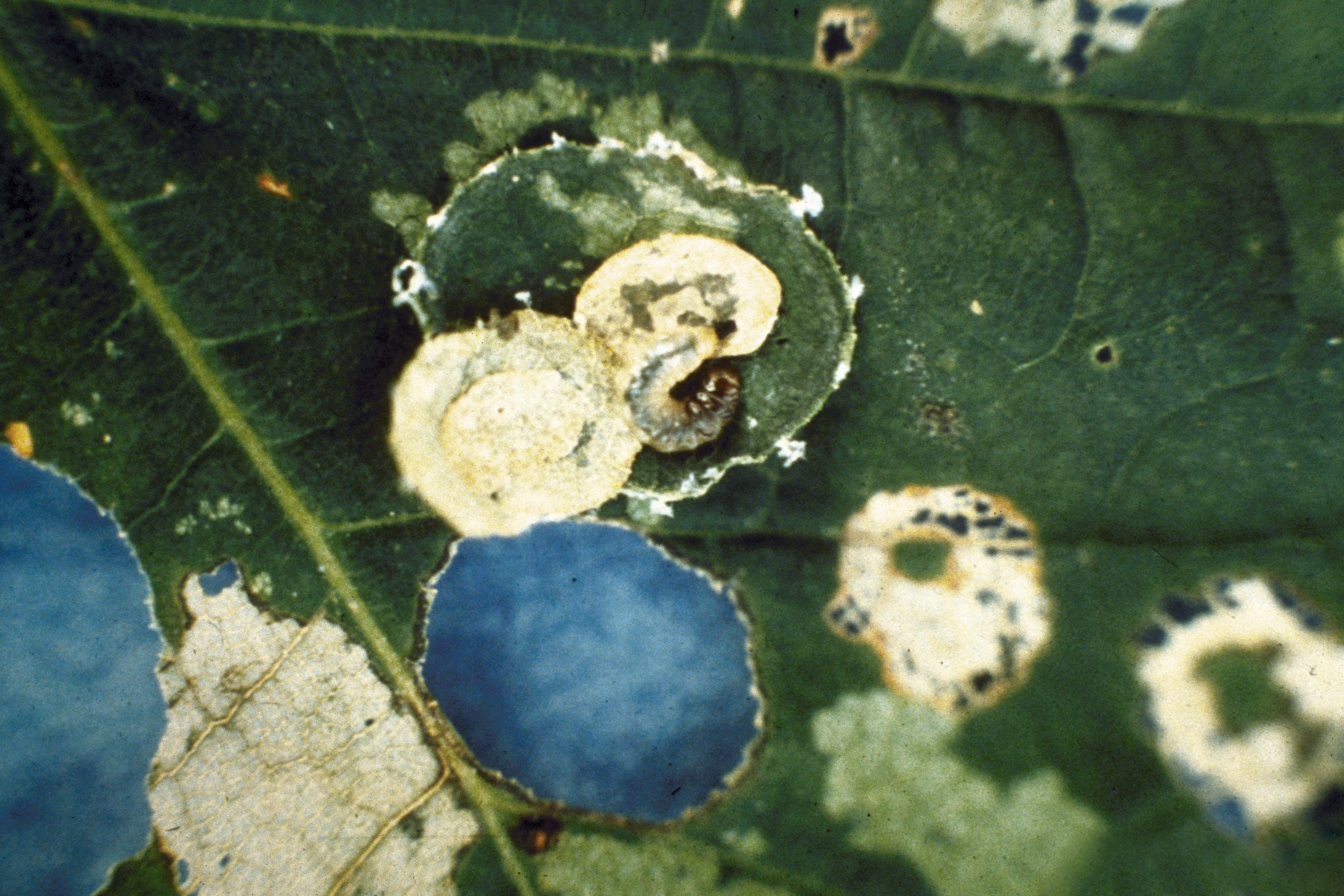
Damage

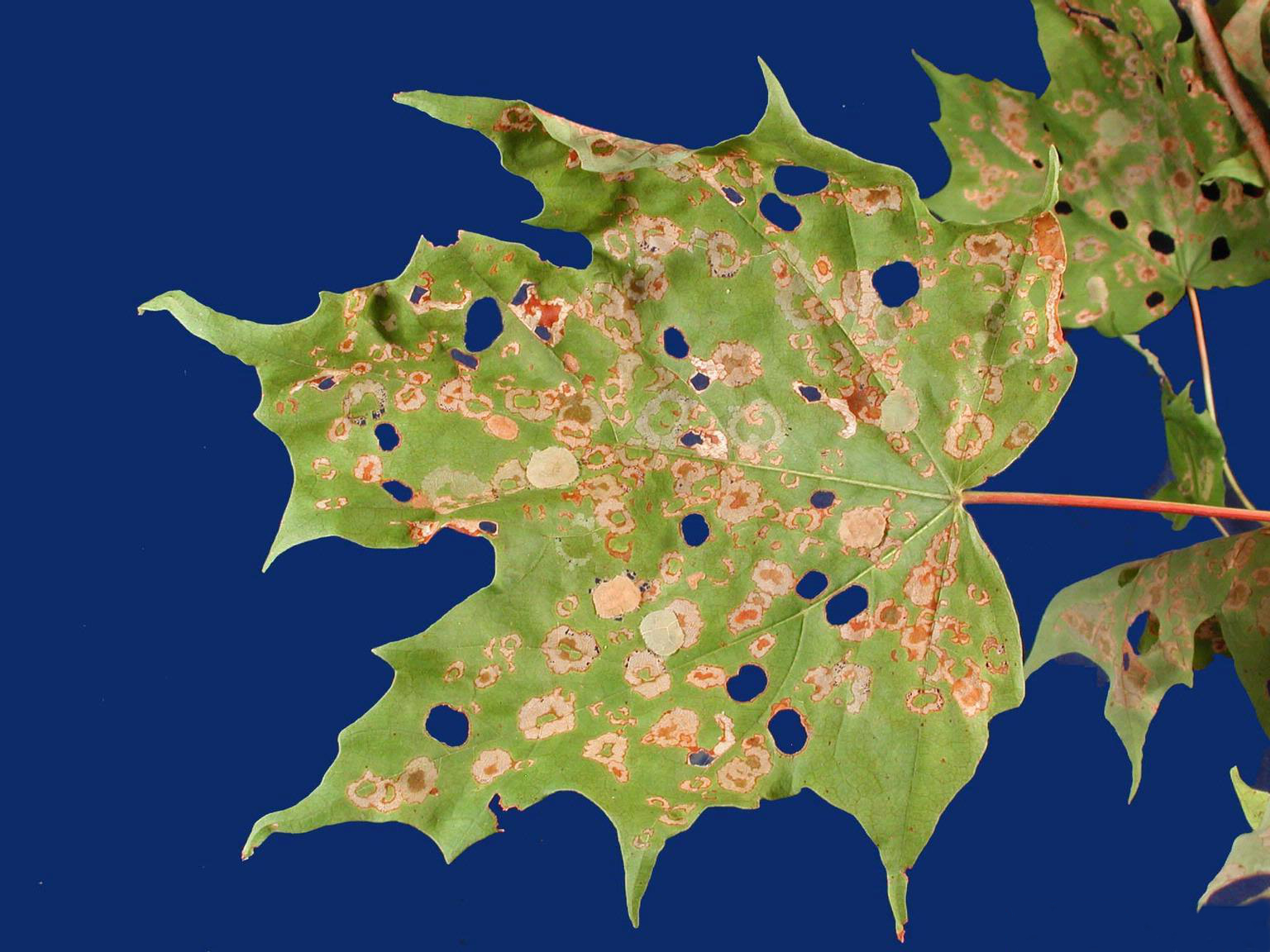
Damage
