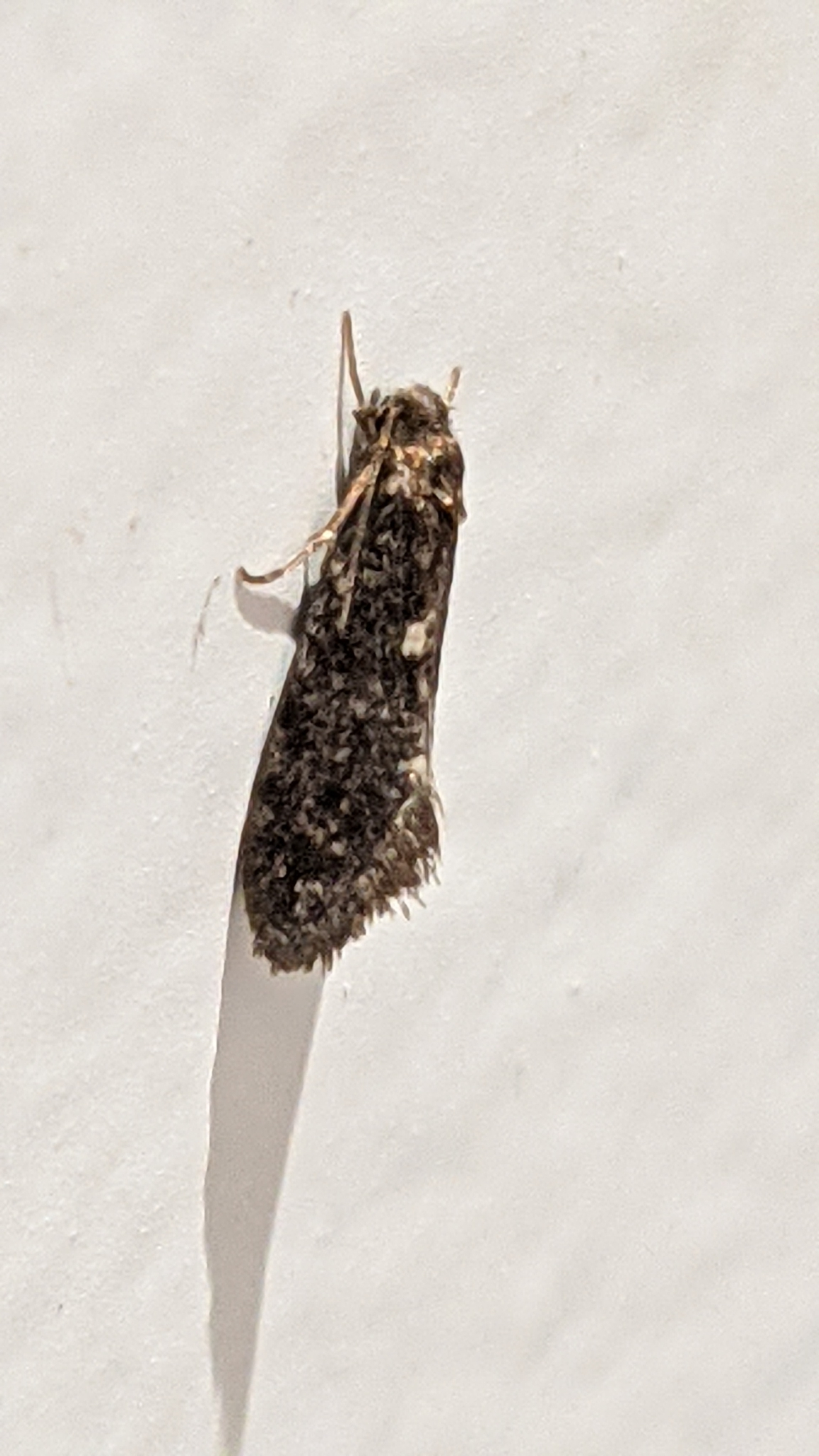
- Type species R. perspersa

Scientific classification
- Domain: Eukaryota
- Kingdom: Animalia
- Phylum: Arthropoda
- Class: Insecta
- Order: Lepidoptera
- Family: Psychidae
- Genus: Rhathamictis; Edward Meyrick, 1924

= Rhathamictis =

Genus of moths

Rhathamictis is a genus of moths of the family Psychidae. It was first described by Edward Meyrick in 1924. Larvae of this genus build small protective cases in which they hide and from which they feed.

== Taxonomy ==
This genus was first described by Edward Meyrick in 1924. The type taxon for this genus is Rhathamictis perspersa.

== Description ==
Meyrick described this genus as follows:

Head loosely rough-haired; ocelli posterior; tongue absent. Antennae 1/2, in ♂ moderately ciliated, basal joint short, with slight pecten. Labial palpi moderate, porrected, second joint rough-scaled beneath, terminal joint short, loosely scaled, obtuse. Maxillary palpi short, slender, 3-jointed, folded laterally. Posterior tibiae rough-scaled above. Forewings 2 from 5/6, 3 from angle, 7 to termen, 8-10 approximated, 11 from before middle. Hindwings 1, elongate-ovate, cilia 3; 2-7 tolerably parallel.

== Distribution ==
This genus is endemic to New Zealand.

== Species ==
Species contained in this genus are as follows:

- Rhathamictis nocturna (Clarke, 1926)
- Rhathamictis perspersa Meyrick, 1924

There is also at least one undescribed species likely of this genus.
