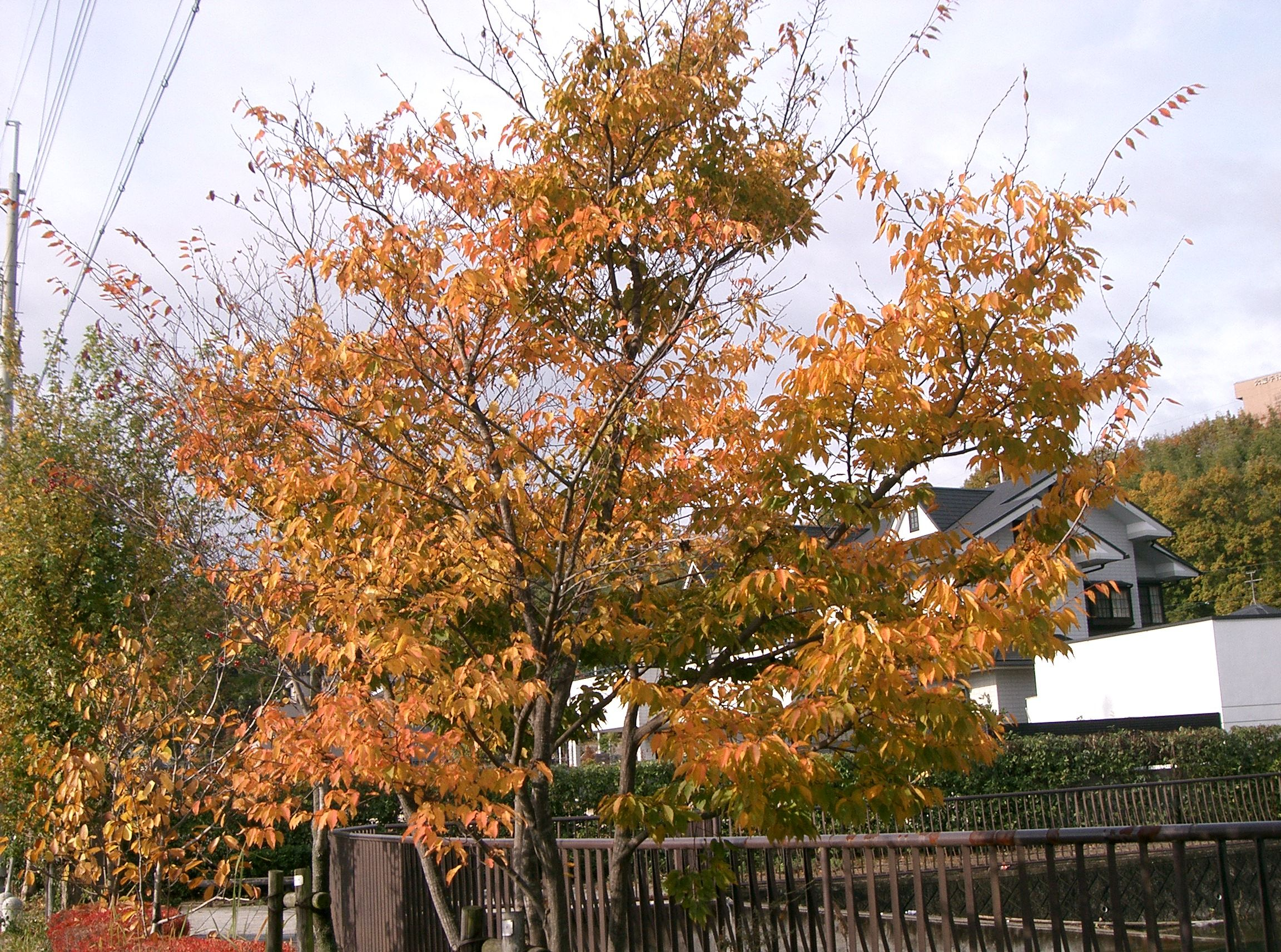
- Autumn colors

Conservation status
- Least Concern (IUCN 3.1)

Scientific classification
- Kingdom: Plantae
- Clade: Tracheophytes
- Clade: Angiosperms
- Clade: Eudicots
- Clade: Rosids
- Order: Fagales
- Family: Betulaceae
- Genus: Carpinus
- Species: C. tschonoskii

Binomial name
- Carpinus tschonoskii Maxim.

Synonyms
- List: Carpinus coreensis Koidz.; Carpinus eximia Nakai; Carpinus fauriei Nakai; Carpinus mianningensis T.P.Li; Carpinus tschonoskii f. brevicalycina (Nakai) M.Kim; Carpinus tschonoskii var. brevicalycina Nakai; Carpinus tschonoskii var. eximia (Nakai) Hatus.; Carpinus tschonoskii f. eximia (Nakai) M.Kim; Carpinus tschonoskii f. pendula Hayashi; Carpinus tschonoskii var. sunintegra H.J.P.Winkl.; Carpinus yedoensis Maxim.; Carpinus yedoensis var. jablonszkyi H.J.P.Winkl.; Carpinus yedoensis var. serratiauriculata H.J.P.Winkl.

= Carpinus tschonoskii =

- Bonsai specimen, here labeled Yeddo hornbeam

Species of plant

Carpinus tschonoskii, called the Asian hornbeam, silky hornbeam, or Chonosuki's hornbeam, is a species of flowering plant in the family Betulaceae. It is native to southern China, South Korea, and central and southern Japan. A deciduous tree reaching 25 m (82 ft), it is found in both mixed evergreen/deciduous and broad-leaved forests, typically on riversides, at elevations from 700 to 2,400 m (2,300 to 7,900 ft). With a wide distribution, it has been assessed as Least Concern. It is available from commercial nurseries.

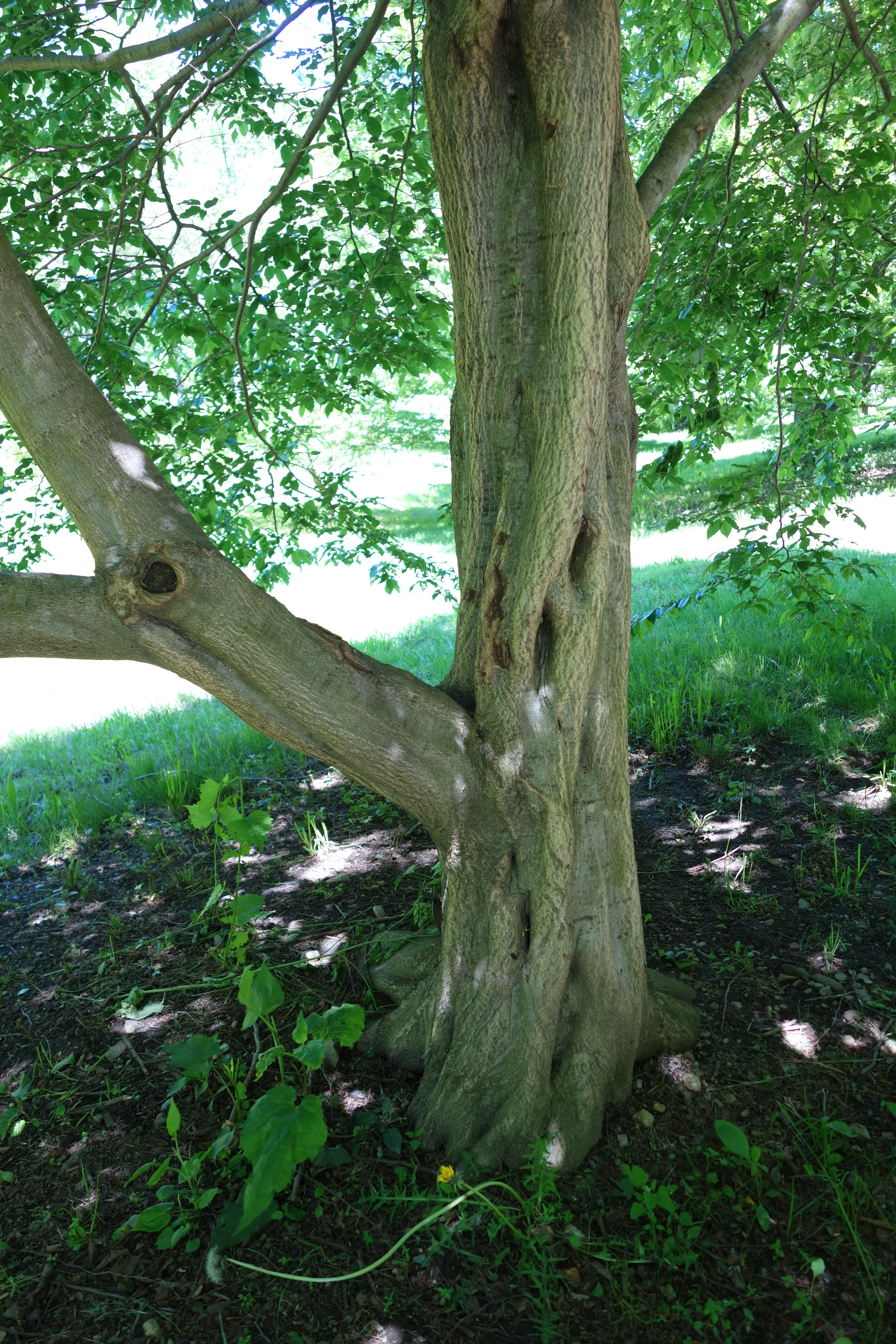
Trunk

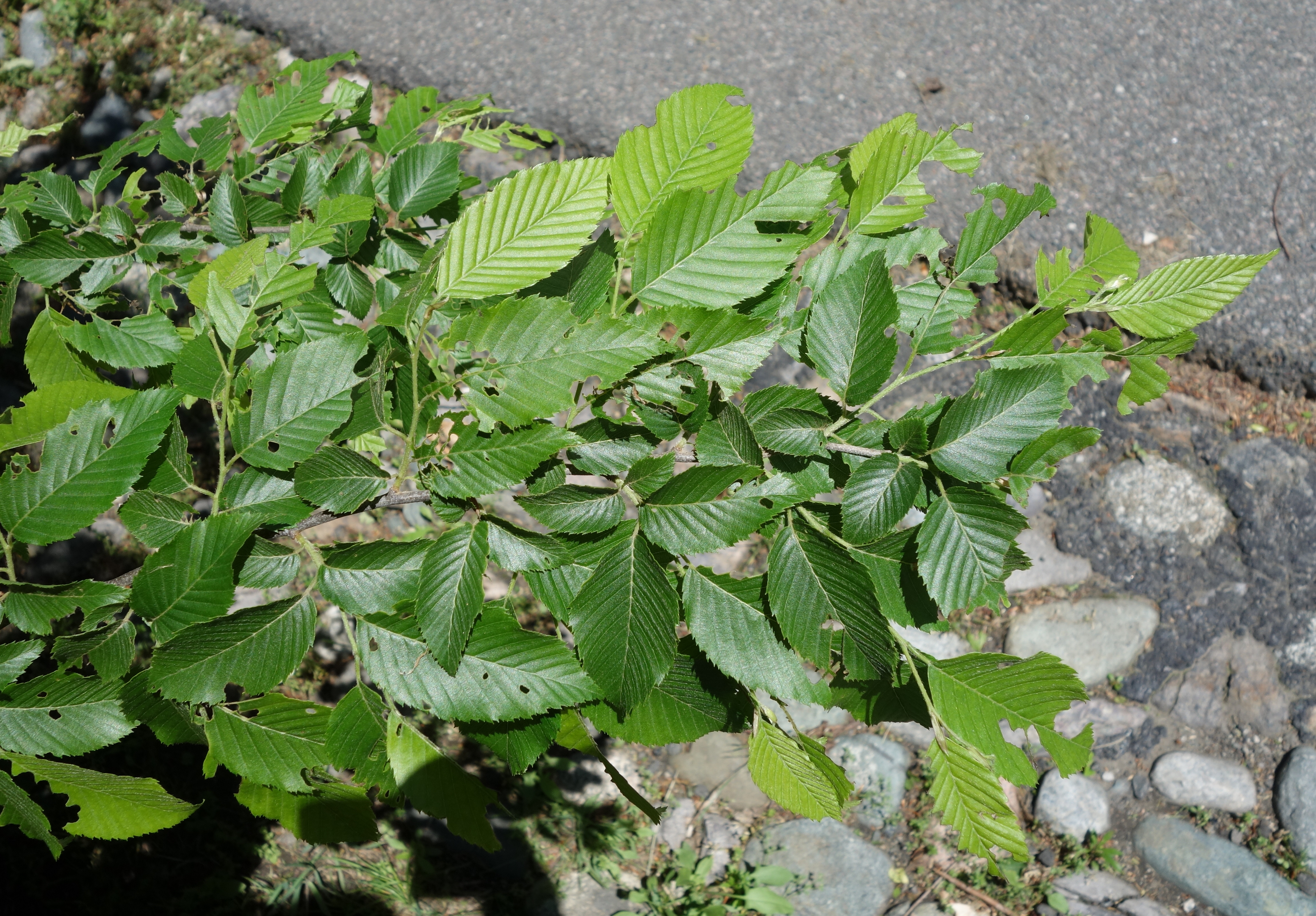
Leaves
