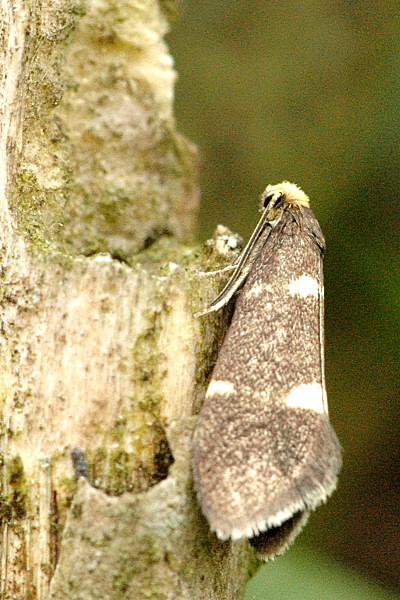
- Female Incurvaria masculella

Scientific classification
- Kingdom: Animalia
- Phylum: Arthropoda
- Clade: Pancrustacea
- Class: Insecta
- Order: Lepidoptera
- Superfamily: Adeloidea
- Family: Incurvariidae; Spuler, 1898

Genera
- Alloclemensia; Basileura; Crinopteryx (disputed); Incurvaria; Paraclemensia; Perthida; Phylloporia; Procacitas; Protaephagus ?Rhathamictis; Simacauda; Subclemensia; Tridentaforma; Vespina †Incurvarites †Prophalonia

Diversity
- 11 genera and 51 species

= Incurvariidae =

Family of moths

Incurvariidae is a family of small primitive monotrysian moths in the order Lepidoptera. There are twelve genera recognised (Davis, 1999). Many species are leaf miners and much is known of their host plants, excluding Paraclemensia acerifoliella. The most familiar species in Europe are perhaps Incurvaria masculella and Phylloporia bistrigella. The narrow wings are held tightly along the body at rest and some species have very long antennae.
