= Neomicropteryx =

Scientific classification
- Kingdom: Animalia
- Phylum: Arthropoda
- Class: Insecta
- Order: Lepidoptera
- Family: Micropterigidae
- Genus: Neomicropteryx; Issiki, 1931

Species
- see text.

Genus of moths in family Micropterigidae

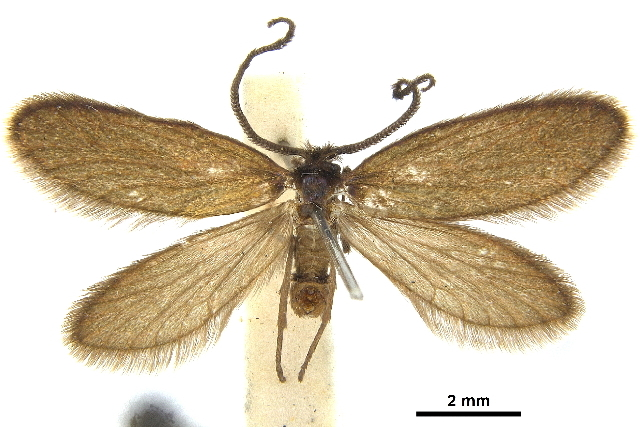
Neomicropteryx elongata

Neomicropteryx is a genus of small primitive metallic moths in the family Micropterigidae.

== Species ==
- Neomicropteryx bifurca Issiki, 1953
- Neomicropteryx cornuta Issiki, 1953
- Neomicropteryx elongata Issiki, 1953
- Neomicropteryx kazusana Hashimoto, 1992
- Neomicropteryx kiwana Hashimoto, 2006
- Neomicropteryx matsumurana Issiki, 1931
- Neomicropteryx nipponensis Issiki, 1931
- Neomicropteryx redacta Hashimoto, 2006

== Former Species ==
- Neomicropteryx nudata Issiki, 1953
