= Neomicropteryx redacta =

Scientific classification
- Domain: Eukaryota
- Kingdom: Animalia
- Phylum: Arthropoda
- Class: Insecta
- Order: Lepidoptera
- Family: Micropterigidae
- Genus: Neomicropteryx
- Species: N. redacta

Binomial name
- Neomicropteryx redacta Hashimoto, 2006

Species of moth

Neomicropteryx redacta is a species of moth belonging to the family Micropterigidae. It was described by Hashimoto in 2006 and is known from Japan.

The length of the forewings is 5.3–5.8 millimetres (0.21–0.23 in) for males and 5.3–5.5 millimetres (0.21–0.22 in) for females.
