= Issikiomartyria akemiae =

Scientific classification
- Domain: Eukaryota
- Kingdom: Animalia
- Phylum: Arthropoda
- Class: Insecta
- Order: Lepidoptera
- Family: Micropterigidae
- Genus: Issikiomartyria
- Species: I. akemiae

Binomial name
- Issikiomartyria akemiae Hashimoto, 2006

Moth species in family Micropterigidae

Issikiomartyria akemiae is a species of moth belonging to the family Micropterigidae. It was described by Hashimoto in 2006 and is endemic to Japan.

The length of the forewings is 4.7–5 millimetres (0.19–0.20 in) for males.
