= Neomicropteryx nipponensis =

Scientific classification
- Kingdom: Animalia
- Phylum: Arthropoda
- Class: Insecta
- Order: Lepidoptera
- Family: Micropterigidae
- Genus: Neomicropteryx
- Species: N. nipponensis

Binomial name
- Neomicropteryx nipponensis Issiki, 1931

Species of moth

Neomicropteryx nipponensis is a species of moth belonging to the family Micropterigidae. It was described by Syuti Issiki in 1931. It is known from Japan.

The length of the forewings is 5.1-5.9 mm for males and 4.9-5.9 mm for females.
