= Neomicropteryx kiwana =

Scientific classification
- Domain: Eukaryota
- Kingdom: Animalia
- Phylum: Arthropoda
- Class: Insecta
- Order: Lepidoptera
- Family: Micropterigidae
- Genus: Neomicropteryx
- Species: N. kiwana

Binomial name
- Neomicropteryx kiwana Hashimoto, 2006

Species of moth

Neomicropteryx kiwana is a species of moth belonging to the family Micropterigidae. It was described by Hashimoto in 2006 and is known from Japan.

The length of the forewings is 5.3–5.8 millimetres (0.21–0.23 in) for males and 5.3–5.5 millimetres (0.21–0.22 in) for females.
