= Issikiomartyria =

Scientific classification
- Kingdom: Animalia
- Phylum: Arthropoda
- Clade: Pancrustacea
- Class: Insecta
- Order: Lepidoptera
- Family: Micropterigidae
- Genus: Issikiomartyria; Hashimoto, 2006

Species
- see text.

Genus of moths in family Micropterigidae

Issikiomartyria is a genus of small primitive metallic moths in the family Micropterigidae.

== Species ==
The following species are assigned to this genus:

- Issikiomartyria akemiae Hashimoto, 2006
- Issikiomartyria bisegmentata Hashimoto, 2006
- Issikiomartyria catapasta Imada & Kato, 2018
- Issikiomartyria distincta Hashimoto, 2006
- Issikiomartyria hyperborea Imada & Kato, 2018
- Issikiomartyria leptobelos Imada & Kato, 2018
- Issikiomartyria nudata
- Issikiomartyria plicata Hashimoto, 2006
- Issikiomartyria trochos Imada & Kato, 2018
