= Neomicropteryx matsumurana =

Scientific classification
- Kingdom: Animalia
- Phylum: Arthropoda
- Class: Insecta
- Order: Lepidoptera
- Family: Micropterigidae
- Genus: Neomicropteryx
- Species: N. matsumurana

Binomial name
- Neomicropteryx matsumurana Issiki, 1931

Species of moth

Neomicropteryx matsumurana is a species of moth belonging to the family Micropterigidae. It was described by Syuti Issiki in 1931. It is known from Japan.

The length of the forewings is 5.1-5.9 mm for males and 4.7-5.7 mm for females.
