= Neomicropteryx cornuta =

Scientific classification
- Kingdom: Animalia
- Phylum: Arthropoda
- Clade: Pancrustacea
- Class: Insecta
- Order: Lepidoptera
- Family: Micropterigidae
- Genus: Neomicropteryx
- Species: N. cornuta

Binomial name
- Neomicropteryx cornuta Issiki, 1953

Species of moth

Neomicropteryx cornuta is a species of moth belonging to the family Micropterigidae. It was described by Syuti Issiki in 1953. It is known from Japan.

The length of the forewings is 5.3-6.1 mm for males and 5.4-5.8 mm for females.
