= Neomicropteryx kazusana =

Scientific classification
- Domain: Eukaryota
- Kingdom: Animalia
- Phylum: Arthropoda
- Class: Insecta
- Order: Lepidoptera
- Family: Micropterigidae
- Genus: Neomicropteryx
- Species: N. kazusana

Binomial name
- Neomicropteryx kazusana Hashimoto, 1992

Species of moth

Neomicropteryx kazusana is a species of moth belonging to the family Micropterigidae. It was described by Hashimoto Satoshi in 1992. It is known from Japan (Honshu).

The length of the forewings is 5.4–5.9 mm for males and 5.3–5.9 mm for females.
