= Issikiomartyria distincta =

Scientific classification
- Domain: Eukaryota
- Kingdom: Animalia
- Phylum: Arthropoda
- Class: Insecta
- Order: Lepidoptera
- Family: Micropterigidae
- Genus: Issikiomartyria
- Species: I. distincta

Binomial name
- Issikiomartyria distincta Hashimoto, 2006

Moth species in family Micropterigidae

Issikiomartyria distincta is a species of moth belonging to the family Micropterigidae. It was described by Hashimoto in 2006 and is endemic to Japan.

The length of the forewings is 4.5 mm (0.18 in) for males.
