= Neomicropteryx bifurca =

Scientific classification
- Kingdom: Animalia
- Phylum: Arthropoda
- Class: Insecta
- Order: Lepidoptera
- Family: Micropterigidae
- Genus: Neomicropteryx
- Species: N. bifurca

Binomial name
- Neomicropteryx bifurca Issiki, 1953

Species of moth

Neomicropteryx bifurca is a species of moth belonging to the family Micropterigidae. It was described by Syuti Issiki in 1953. It is known from Japan.

The length of the forewings is 5-5.8 mm for males and 5.1-5.5 mm for females.
