= Neomicropteryx elongata =

Scientific classification
- Kingdom: Animalia
- Phylum: Arthropoda
- Class: Insecta
- Order: Lepidoptera
- Family: Micropterigidae
- Genus: Neomicropteryx
- Species: N. elongata

Binomial name
- Neomicropteryx elongata Issiki, 1953

Species of moth

Neomicropteryx elongata is a species of moth belonging to the family Micropterigidae. It was described by Syuti Issiki in 1953. It is known from Japan.

The length of the forewings is 5.5-6.1 mm for males and 5.4-5.5 mm for females.
