= Issikiomartyria nudata =

Scientific classification
- Domain: Eukaryota
- Kingdom: Animalia
- Phylum: Arthropoda
- Class: Insecta
- Order: Lepidoptera
- Family: Micropterigidae
- Genus: Issikiomartyria
- Species: I. nudata

Binomial name
- Issikiomartyria nudata (Issiki, 1953)

Synonyms
- Neomicropteryx nudata Issiki, 1953

Moth species in family Micropterigidae

Issikiomartyria nudata is a species of moth belonging to the family Micropterigidae. It was described by Syuti Issiki in 1953. It is known from Japan.

The length of the forewings is 4.4–5.1 millimetres (0.17–0.20 in) for males and 4.8–5.1 mm (0.19–0.20 in) for females.
