= List of moths of Russia (Micropterigoidea-Yponomeutoidea) =

This is a list of the Russian moth species of the superfamilies Micropterigoidea, Nepticuloidea, Adeloidea, Tischerioidea, Tineoidea, Gracillarioidea and Yponomeutoidea. It also acts as an index to the species articles and forms part of the full List of moths of Russia.

== Micropterigoidea ==
=== Micropterigidae ===
- Micropterix aruncella (Scopoli, 1763)
- Micropterix aureatella (Scopoli, 1763)
- Micropterix avarcella Zagulajev, 1994
- Micropterix calthella (Linnaeus, 1761)
- Micropterix mansuetella Zeller, 1844
- Micropterix maschukella Alphéraky, 1876
- Micropterix montosiella Zagulajev, 1983
- Micropterix sikhotealinensis Ponomarenko & Beljaev, 2000

=== Eriocraniidae ===
- Dyseriocrania ermolaevi Kozlov, 1983
- Dyseriocrania subpurpurella (Haworth, 1828)
- Eriocrania chrysolepidella Zeller, 1851
- Eriocrania cicatricella (Zetterstedt, 1839)
- Eriocrania sakhalinella Kozlov, 1983
- Eriocrania salopiella (Stainton, 1854)
- Eriocrania sangii (Wood, 1891)
- Eriocrania semipurpurella (Stephens, 1835)
- Eriocrania sparrmannella (Bose, 1791)
- Eriocrania unimaculella (Zetterstedt, 1839)
- Eriocrania ussuriella Karsholt, Kozlov & Kristensen, 1997

=== Hepialidae ===
- Endoclita excrescens (Butler, 1877)
- Endoclita sinensis (Moore, 1877)
- Gazoryctra chishimana (Matsumura, 1931)
- Gazoryctra fuscoargenteus (O. Bang-Haas, 1927)
- Gazoryctra ganna (Hübner, [1804])
- Gazoryctra macilentus (Eversmann, 1851)
- Hepialus humuli (Linnaeus, 1758)
- Korscheltellus lupulina (Linnaeus, 1758)
- Pharmacis carna ([Denis & Schiffermüller], 1775)
- Pharmacis fusconebulosa (De Geer, 1778)
- Phymatopus hecta (Linnaeus, 1758)
- Phymatopus hectica (O. Bang-Haas, 1927)
- Phymatopus japonicus Inoue, 1982
- Thitarodes variabilis (Bremer, 1861)
- Thitarodes varius (Staudinger, 1887)
- Triodia sylvina (Linnaeus, 1761)
- Zenophassus schamyl (Christoph, 1888)

== Nepticuloidea ==
=== Nepticulidae ===
- Bohemannia manschurella Puplesis, 1984
- Bohemannia nubila Puplesis, 1985
- Bohemannia piotra Puplesis, 1984
- Bohemannia pulverosella (Stainton, 1849)
- Bohemannia suiphunella Puplesis, 1984
- Bohemannia ussuriella Puplesis, 1984
- Ectoedemia admiranda Puplesis, 1984
- Ectoedemia agrimoniae (Frey, 1858)
- Ectoedemia albifasciella (Heinemann, 1871)
- Ectoedemia aligera Puplesis, 1985
- Ectoedemia amani Svensson, 1966
- Ectoedemia angulifasciella (Stainton, 1849)
- Ectoedemia arcuatella (Herrich-Schäffer, 1855)
- Ectoedemia argyropeza (Zeller, 1839)
- Ectoedemia arisi Puplesis, 1984
- Ectoedemia atricollis (Stainton, 1857)
- Ectoedemia caradjai (Groschke, 1944)
- Ectoedemia chasanella Puplesis, 1984
- Ectoedemia christopheri Puplesis, 1984
- Ectoedemia ermolaevi Puplesis, 1985
- Ectoedemia hannoverella (Glitz, 1872)
- Ectoedemia heringi (Toll, 1934)
- Ectoedemia insularis Puplesis, 1985
- Ectoedemia intimella (Zeller, 1848)
- Ectoedemia ivinskisi Puplesis, 1984
- Ectoedemia laura Puplesis, 1985
- Ectoedemia liebwerdella Zimmermann, 1940
- Ectoedemia longicaudella Klimesch, 1953
- Ectoedemia maculata Puplesis, 1987
- Ectoedemia minimella (Zetterstedt, 1839)
- Ectoedemia occultella (Linnaeus, 1767)
- Ectoedemia olvina Puplesis, 1984
- Ectoedemia ornatella Puplesis, 1984
- Ectoedemia ortiva Rocienė & Stonis, 2013
- Ectoedemia philipi Puplesis, 1984
- Ectoedemia picturata Puplesis, 1985
- Ectoedemia pilosae Puplesis, 1984
- Ectoedemia scoblei Puplesis, 1984
- Ectoedemia sinevi Puplesis, 1985
- Ectoedemia sivickisi Puplesis, 1984
- Ectoedemia spinosella (de Joannis, 1908)
- Ectoedemia subbimaculella (Haworth, 1828)
- Ectoedemia turbidella (Zeller, 1848)
- Etainia capesella (Puplesis, 1985)
- Etainia peterseni (Puplesis, 1985)
- Etainia sabina (Puplesis, 1985)
- Etainia sericopeza (Zeller, 1839)
- Etainia tigrinella (Puplesis, 1985)
- Fomoria hypericifolia Kuroko, 1982
- Fomoria permira Puplesis, 1984
- Fomoria septembrella (Stainton, 1849)
- Fomoria weaveri (Stainton, 1855)
- Stigmella aceris (Frey, 1857)
- Stigmella aeneofasciella (Herrich-Schäffer, 1855)
- Stigmella aladina Puplesis, 1984
- Stigmella alisa Puplesis, 1985
- Stigmella alnetella (Stainton, 1856)
- Stigmella amuriella Puplesis, 1985
- Stigmella anomalella (Goeze, 1783)
- Stigmella assimilella (Zeller, 1848)
- Stigmella atricapitella (Haworth, 1828)
- Stigmella attenuata Puplesis, 1985
- Stigmella aurella (Fabricius, 1775)
- Stigmella auricularia Puplesis, Diskus & Juchnevic, 2003
- Stigmella aurora Puplesis, 1984
- Stigmella basiguttella (Heinemann, 1862)
- Stigmella benanderella (Wolff, 1955)
- Stigmella betulicola (Stainton, 1856)
- Stigmella carpinella (Heinemann, 1862)
- Stigmella catharticella (Stainton, 1853)
- Stigmella confusella (Wood & Walsingham, 1894)
- Stigmella continuella (Stainton, 1856)
- Stigmella crataegivora Puplesis, 1985
- Stigmella dentatae Puplesis, 1984
- Stigmella desperatella (Frey, 1856)
- Stigmella dryadella (Hofmann, 1868)
- Stigmella fervida Puplesis, 1984
- Stigmella floslactella (Haworth, 1828)
- Stigmella freyella (Heyden, 1858)
- Stigmella gimmonella (Matsumura, 1931)
- Stigmella glutinosae (Stainton, 1858)
- Stigmella hybnerella (Hübner, [1813])
- Stigmella incognitella (Herrich-Schäffer, 1855)
- Stigmella kazakhstanica Puplesis, 1991
- Stigmella kozlovi Puplesis, 1984
- Stigmella kurilensis Puplesis, 1987
- Stigmella kurokoi Puplesis, 1984
- Stigmella lapponica (Wocke, 1862)
- Stigmella lediella (Schleich, 1867)
- Stigmella lemniscella (Zeller, 1839)
- Stigmella lonicerarum (Frey, 1856)
- Stigmella lurida Puplesis, 1994
- Stigmella luteella (Stainton, 1857)
- Stigmella magdalenae (Klimesch, 1950)
- Stigmella malella (Stainton, 1854)
- Stigmella micromelis Puplesis, 1985
- Stigmella microtheriella (Stainton, 1854)
- Stigmella minusculella (Hemch-Schaffer, 1855)
- Stigmella mirabella (Puplesis, 1984)
- Stigmella monella Puplesis, 1984
- Stigmella monticulella Puplesis, 1984
- Stigmella myrtillella (Stainton, 1857)
- Stigmella naturnella (Klimesch, 1936)
- Stigmella nivenburgensis (Preissecker, 1942)
- Stigmella nostrata Puplesis, 1984
- Stigmella nylandriella (Tengstrom, 1848)
- Stigmella obliquella (Heinemann, 1862)
- Stigmella omelkoi Puplesis, 1984
- Stigmella oxyacanthella (Stainton, 1854)
- Stigmella palionisi Puplesis, 1984
- Stigmella palmatae Puplesis, 1984
- Stigmella paradoxa (Frey, 1858)
- Stigmella perpygmaeella (Doubleday, 1859)
- Stigmella plagicolella (Stainton, 1854)
- Stigmella prunetorum (Stainton, 1855)
- Stigmella regina Puplesis, 1984
- Stigmella roborella (Johansson, 1971)
- Stigmella rolandi van Nieukerken, 1990
- Stigmella ruficapitella (Haworth, 1828)
- Stigmella sakhalinella Puplesis, 1984
- Stigmella salicis (Stainton, 1854)
- Stigmella samiatella (Zeller, 1839)
- Stigmella sashai Puplesis, 1984
- Stigmella sorbi (Stainton, 1861)
- Stigmella splendidissimella (Herrich-Schäffer, 1855)
- Stigmella taigae Puplesis, 1984
- Stigmella tegmentosella Puplesis, 1984
- Stigmella thuringiaca (Petry, 1904)
- Stigmella tiliae (Frey, 1856)
- Stigmella tranocrossa Kemperman & Wilkinson, 1985
- Stigmella trimaculella (Haworth, 1828)
- Stigmella ulmiphaga (Preissecker, 1942)
- Stigmella ulmivora (Fologne, 1860)
- Stigmella ultima Puplesis, 1984
- Stigmella viscerella (Stainton, 1853)
- Stigmella zagulaevi Puplesis, 1994
- Stigmella zelleriella (Snellen, 1875)
- Trifurcula beirnei Puplesis, 1984
- Trifurcula chamaecytisi Z.Lastuvka & Lastuvka, 1994
- Trifurcula headleyella (Stainton, 1854)
- Trifurcula pallidella (Duponchel, 1843)
- Trifurcula puplesisi van Nieukerken, 1990
- Trifurcula silviae van Nieukerken, 1990
- Trifurcula subnitidella (Duponchel, 1843)

=== Opostegidae ===
- Opostega angulata Gerasimno, 1930
- Opostega kuznetzovi Kozlov, 1985
- Opostega salaciella (Treitschke, 1833)
- Opostega stekolnikovi Kozlov, 1985
- Opostegoides albella Sinev, 1990
- Opostegoides bicolorella Sinev, 1990
- Opostegoides minodensis (Kuroko, 1982)
- Opostegoides omelkoi Kozlov, 1985
- Opostegoides padiensis Sinev, 1990
- Opostegoides sinevi Kozlov, 1985
- Pseudopostega auritella (Hübner, [1813])
- Pseudopostega crepusculella (Zeller, 1839)

== Adeloidea ==
=== Heliozelidae ===
- Antispila metallella ([Denis & Schiffermüller], 1775)
- Heliozela hammoniella Sorhagen, 1885
- Heliozela resplendella (Stainton, 1851)
- Heliozela sericiella (Haworth, 1828)
- Holocacista rivillei (Stainton, 1855)
- Tyriozela porphyrogona Meyrick, 1931

=== Adelidae ===
- Adela croesella (Scopoli, 1763)
- Adela cuprella ([Denis & Schiffermüller], 1775)
- Adela mazzolella (Hübner, [1801])
- Adela nobilis Christoph, 1882
- Adela reaumurella (Linnaeus, 1758)
- Adela suffusa Caradja, 1920
- Adela violella ([Denis & Schiffermüller], 1775)
- Cauchas breviantennella Nielsen & Johansson, 1980
- Cauchas canalella (Eversmann, 1844)
- Cauchas fibulella ([Denis & Schiffermüller], 1775)
- Cauchas florella (Staudinger, 1871)
- Cauchas leucocerella (Scopoli, 1763)
- Cauchas mikkolai Kozlov, 1993
- Cauchas rufifrontella (Treitschke, 1833)
- Cauchas rufimitrella (Scopoli, 1763)
- Nematopogon adansoniella (De Villers, 1789)
- Nematopogon caucasica (Rebel, 1893)
- Nematopogon dorsiguttella (Erschoff, 1877)
- Nematopogon magna (Zeller, 1878)
- Nematopogon metaxella (Hübner, [1813])
- Nematopogon pilella ([Denis & Schiffermüller], 1775)
- Nematopogon robertella (Clerck, 1759)
- Nematopogon schwarziellus Zeller, 1839
- Nematopogon swammerdamella (Linnaeus, 1758)
- Nemophora agalmatella (Caradja, 1920)
- Nemophora amatella (Staudinger, 1892)
- Nemophora askoldella (Milliere, 1879)
- Nemophora associatella (Zeller, 1839)
- Nemophora aurifera (Butler, 1881)
- Nemophora basella (Eversmann, 1844)
- Nemophora bellela (Walker, 1863)
- Nemophora bifasciatella (Issiki, 1930)
- Nemophora chalybeella (Bremer, 1864)
- Nemophora congruella (Zeller, 1839)
- Nemophora cupriacella (Hübner, [1819])
- Nemophora degeerella (Linnaeus, 1758)
- Nemophora dumerilellus (Duponchel, 1839)
- Nemophora fasciella (Fabricius, 1775)
- Nemophora insulariella Kozlov, 1997
- Nemophora japonica Stringer, 1930
- Nemophora karafutonis (Matsumura, 1932)
- Nemophora lapikella Kozlov, 1997
- Nemophora metallica (Poda, 1761)
- Nemophora minimella ([Denis & Schiffermüller], 1775)
- Nemophora molella (Hübner, [1816])
- Nemophora ochrocephala Kozlov, 1997
- Nemophora ochsenheimerella (Hübner, [1813])
- Nemophora ommatella Caradja, 1920
- Nemophora paradisea Butler, 1881
- Nemophora pfeifferella (Hübner, [1813])
- Nemophora prodigellus (Zeller, 1853)
- Nemophora raddei (Rebel, 1901)
- Nemophora rubrofascia (Christoph, 1882)
- Nemophora schrencki (Bremer, 1864)
- Nemophora sinevi Kozlov, 1997
- Nemophora staudingerella (Christoph, 1882)
- Nemophora sylvatica Hirowatari, 1995
- Nemophora violellus (Stainton, 1851)
- Nemophora wakayamensis (Matsumura, 1931)

=== Prodoxidae ===
- Greya kononenkoi Kozlov, 1996
- Greya variabilis Davis & Pellmyr, 1992
- Lampronia aeneella (Heinemann, 1870)
- Lampronia altaica Zagulajev, 1992
- Lampronia capitella (Clerck, 1759)
- Lampronia corticella (Linnaeus, 1758)
- Lampronia flavimitrella (Hübner, [1817])
- Lampronia fuscatella (Tengstrom, 1848)
- Lampronia luzella (Hübner, [1817])
- Lampronia provectella (Heyden, 1865)
- Lampronia pubicornis (Haworth, 1828)
- Lampronia redimitella (Lienig & Zeller, 1846)
- Lampronia rupella ([Denis & Schiffermüller], 1775)
- Lampronia sakhalinella Kozlov, 1996
- Lampronia splendidella (Heinemann, 1870)
- Lampronia standfussiella Zeller, 1852

=== Incurvariidae ===
- Alloclemensia devotella (Rebel, 1893)
- Alloclemensia mesospilella (Herrich-Schäffer, 1854)
- Alloclemensia minima Kozlov, 1987
- Incurvaria circulella (Zetterstedt, 1839)
- Incurvaria masculella ([Denis & Schiffermüller], 1775)
- Incurvaria oehlmanniella (Hübner, 1796)
- Incurvaria pectinea Haworth, 1828
- Incurvaria praelatella ([Denis &, Schiffermüller], 1775)
- Incurvaria vetulella (Zetterstedt, 1839)
- Paraclemensia cyanella (Zeller, 1850)
- Paraclemensia incerta (Christoph, 1882)
- Phylloporia bistrigella (Haworth, 1828)
- Procacitas orientella Kozlov, 1987
- Subclemensia taigae Kozlov, 1987
- Vespina nielseni Kozlov, 1987

== Tischerioidea ==
=== Tischeriidae ===
- Coptotriche angusticollella (Duponchel, 1843)
- Coptotriche gaunacella (Duponchel, 1843)
- Coptotriche heinemanni (Wocke, 1871)
- Coptotriche marginea (Haworth, 1828)
- Coptotriche orientalis Puplesis & Diskus, 2003
- Tischeria decidua Wocke, 1876
- Tischeria dodonaea Stainton, 1858
- Tischeria ekebladella (Bjerkander, 1795)
- Tischeria lvovskyi Kozlov, 1986
- Tischeria puplesisi Kozlov, 1986
- Tischeria quercifolia Kuroko, 1982
- Tischeria relictana Ermolaev, 1986
- Tischeria sichotensis Ermolaev, 1986

== Tineoidea ==
=== Tineidae ===
- Agnathosia chasanica Gaedike, 2000
- Agnathosia mendicella ([Denis & Schiffermüller], 1775)
- Anomalotinea liguriella (Milliere, 1879)
- Archinemapogon assamensis Robinson, 1986
- Archinemapogon ussuriensis Zagulajev, 1962
- Archinemapogon yildizae Kodak, 1981
- Ateliotum hungaricellum Zeller, 1839
- Cephimallota chasanica Zagulajev, 1965
- Cephimallota crassiflavella Bruand, [1851]
- Cephimallota praetoriella (Christoph, 1872)
- Cephimallota tunesiella (Zagulajev, 1966)
- Cephitinea colonella (Erschoff, 1876)
- Ceratuncus affinitellus (Rebel, 1901)
- Ceratuncus danubiella (Mann, 1866)
- Ceratuncus dzhungaricus Zagulajev, 1971
- Crassicornella crassicornella (Zeller, 1847)
- Dasyses barbata (Christoph, 1882)
- Dryadaula caucasica (Zagulajev, 1970)
- Dryadaula multifurcata Gaedike, 2000
- Dryadaula ussurica Gaedike, 2000
- Dryadaula zinica (Zagulajev, 1970)
- Elatobia fuliginosella (Lienig & Zeller, 1846)
- Elatobia kostjuki Zagulajev, 1994
- Elatobia ussurica Zagulajev, 1990
- Eudarcia abhasica (Zagulajev, 1997)
- Eudarcia daghestanica (Zagulajev, 1993)
- Eudarcia granulatella (Zeller, 1852)
- Eudarcia holtzi (Rebel, 1902)
- Eudarcia orbiculodomus (Sakai & Saigusa, 1999)
- Eudarcia ornata Gaedike, 2000
- Eudarcia sinjovi Gaedike, 2000
- Euplocamus anthracinalis (Scopoli, 1763)
- Haplotinea ditella (Pierce & Diakonoff, 1938)
- Haplotinea insectella (Fabricius, 1794)
- Infurcitinea finalis (Gozmány, 1959)
- Infurcitinea ignicomella (Heydenreich, 1851)
- Infurcitinea roesslerella (Heyden, 1865)
- Infurcitinea tauridella G.Petersen, 1968
- Monopis burmanni G.Petersen, 1979
- Monopis christophi G.Petersen, 1957
- Monopis crocicapitella (Clemens, 1859)
- Monopis imella (Hübner, [1813])
- Monopis laevigella ([Denis & Schiffermüller], 1775)
- Monopis luteocostalis Gaedike, 2006
- Monopis monachella (Hübner, 1796)
- Monopis obviella ([Denis & Schiffermüller], 1775)
- Monopis pallidella Zagulajev, 1955
- Monopis pavlovskii Zagulajev, 1955
- Monopis spilotella (Tengstrom, 1848)
- Monopis weaverella (Scott, 1858)
- Monopis zagulajevi Gaedike, 2000
- Montescardia kurenzovi (Zagulajev, 1966)
- Montescardia tessulatella (Lienig & Zeller, 1846)
- Morophaga bucephala Snellen, 1884
- Morophaga choragella ([Denis & Schiffermüller], 1775)
- Morophaga fasciculata Robinson, 1986
- Morophagoides iranensis G.Petersen, 1960
- Morophagoides ussuriensis (Caradja, 1920)
- Myrmecozela lutosella (Eversmann, 1844)
- Myrmecozela mongolica G.Petersen, 1965
- Myrmecozela ochraceella (Tengstrom, 1848)
- Myrmecozela rjabovi Zagulajev, 1968
- Myrmecozela samurensis Zagulajev, 1997
- Nemapogon agnathosella Gaedike, 2000
- Nemapogon bachmarensis Zagulajev, 1964
- Nemapogon caucasicus Zagulajev, 1964
- Nemapogon clematella (Fabricius, 1781)
- Nemapogon cloacella (Haworth, 1828)
- Nemapogon defrisiensis Zagulajev, 1964
- Nemapogon echinata Gaedike, 2000
- Nemapogon fungivorella (Benander, 1939)
- Nemapogon gerasimovi (Zagulajev, 1961)
- Nemapogon gliriella (Heyden, 1865)
- Nemapogon granella (Linnaeus, 1758)
- Nemapogon gravosaella G.Petersen, 1957
- Nemapogon hungaricus Gozmány, 1960
- Nemapogon inconditella (D.Lucas, 1956)
- Nemapogon meridionella (Zagulajev, 1962)
- Nemapogon nevella Zagulajev, 1963
- Nemapogon nigralbella (Zeller, 1839)
- Nemapogon orientalis G.Petersen, 1961
- Nemapogon picarella (Clerck, 1759)
- Nemapogon quercicolella (Zeller, 1852)
- Nemapogon robusta Gaedike, 2000
- Nemapogon ruricolella (Stainton, 1849)
- Nemapogon somchetiella Zagulajev, 1961
- Nemapogon teberdellus (Zagulaj ev, 1963)
- Nemapogon variatella (Clemens, 1859)
- Nemapogon wolfierella (Karsholt & Nielsen, 1976)
- Nemaxera betulinella (Paykull, 1785)
- Neurothaumasia ankerella (Mann, 1867)
- Niditinea fuscella (Linnaeus, 1758)
- Niditinea nigrocapitella (Zagulajev, 1960)
- Niditinea striolella (Matsumura, 1931)
- Niditinea truncicolella (Tengstrom, 1848)
- Niditinea tugurialis (Meyrick, 1932)
- Oinophila v-flava (Haworth, 1828)
- Opogona nipponica (Staudinger, 1871)
- Pararhodobates syriacus (Lederer, 1857)
- Psychoides phaedrospora (Meyrick, 1935)
- Reisserita relicinella (Zeller, 1839)
- Scardia amurensis Zagulajev, 1965
- Scardia boletella (Fabricius, 1794)
- Scardia caucasica Zagulajev, 1965
- Stenoptinea cyaneimarmorella (Milliere, 1854)
- Tinea bothniella Svensson, 1953
- Tinea columbariella Wocke, 1877
- Tinea dubiella Stainton, 1859
- Tinea fuscocostalis Gaedike, 2006
- Tinea omichlopis Meyrick, 1928
- Tinea pallescentella Stainton, 1851
- Tinea pellionella Linnaeus, 1758
- Tinea semifulvella Haworth, 1828
- Tinea steueri G.Petersen, 1966
- Tinea svenssoni Opheim, 1965
- Tinea translucens Meyrick, 1917
- Tinea trinotella Thunberg, 1794
- Tineola bisselliella (Hummel, 1823)
- Triaxomasia orientanus (Ponomarenko & Park, 1996)
- Triaxomera caucasiella Zagulajev, 1959
- Triaxomera fulvimitrella (Sodoffsky, 1830)
- Triaxomera kurilensis Zagulajev, 1996
- Triaxomera parasitella (Hübner, 1796)
- Trichophaga bipartiella (Ragonot, 1858)
- Trichophaga scandinaviella Zagulajev, 1960
- Trichophaga tapetzella (Linnaeus, 1758)
- Trichophaga ziniella Zagulajev, 1960
- Wegneria panchalcella (Staudinger, 1871)

=== Galacticidae ===
- Galactica pluripunctella Caradja, 1920
- Galactica walsinghami (Caradja, 1920)
- Zarcinia melanozestas Meyrick, 1935

=== Eriocottidae ===
- Deuterotinea casanella (Eversmann, 1844)

=== Lypusidae ===
- Lypusa maurella ([Denis & Schiffermüller], 1775)

=== Psychidae ===
- Acanthopsyche atra (Linnaeus, 1767)
- Acanthopsyche ecksteini (Lederer, 1855)
- Acanthopsyche murzini Solanikov, 1994
- Acanthopsyche semiglabra Solanikov, 2004
- Acanthopsyche subatrata I.Kozhantshikov, 1956
- Acanthopsyche tshemalica Solanikov, 1996
- Acanthopsyche uralensis (Freyer, 1852)
- Acentra vestalis (Staudinger, 1871)
- Anaproutia caucasica (Solanikov, 1991)
- Anaproutia elongatella (I.Kozhantshikov, 1956)
- Anaproutia norvegica (Heylaerts, 1882)
- Anaproutia sichotealinica (Solanikov, 1981)
- Apterona helicoidella (Vallot, 1827)
- Atelopsycha mataea Meyrick, 1937
- Bacotia claustrella (Bruand, 1845)
- Bijugis bombycella ([Denis & Schiffermüller], 1775)
- Bijugis pectinella ([Denis & Schiffermüller], 1775)
- Bijugis proxima (Lederer, 1853)
- Bijugis subgrisea I.Kozhantshikov, 1956
- Canephora hirsuta (Poda, 1761)
- Dahlica charlottae (Meier, 1957)
- Dahlica dubatolovi (Solanikov, 1990)
- Dahlica kabardica Solanikov, 2002
- Dahlica kurentzovi (Solanikov, 1990)
- Dahlica lazuri (Clerck, 1759)
- Dahlica lichenella (Linnaeus, 1761)
- Dahlica maritimella (Solanikov, 1990)
- Dahlica modestella (Solanikov, 1990)
- Dahlica pallidella (Zagulajev, 1997)
- Dahlica samurensis (Zagulajev, 1993)
- Dahlica triquetrella (Hübner, [1813])
- Diplodoma adzharica Zagulajev, 1985
- Diplodoma laichartingella (Goeze, 1783)
- Diplodoma samurica Zagulajev, 1992
- Diplodoma talgica Zagulajev, 1993
- Eosolenobia grisea Filipjev, 1924
- Eosolenobia suifunella (Christoph, 1882)
- Epichnopterix crimaeana I.Kozhantshikov, 1956
- Epichnopterix moskvensis Solanikov, 2001
- Epichnopterix plumella ([Denis & Schiffermüller], 1775)
- Eumelasina ardua I.Kozhantshikov, 1956
- Kozhantshikovia borisi Solanikov, 1990
- Megalophanes stetinensis Hering, 1846
- Megalophanes viciella ([Denis & Schiffermüller], 1775)
- Montanima aurea Hattenschwiler, 1996
- Narycia archipica Zagulajev, 2002
- Narycia duplicella (Goeze, 1783)
- Narycia maschukella Zagulajev, 1994
- Narycia tarkitavica Zagulajev, 1993
- Oiketicoides borealis (I.Kozhantshikov, 1956)
- Oiketicoides lutea (Staudinger, 1870)
- Oiketicoides senex (Staudinger, 1871)
- Oiketicoides simulans I.Kozhantshikov, 1956
- Pachythelia villosella (Ochsenheimer, 1810)
- Phalacropterix graslinella (Boisduval, 1852)
- Praesolenobia desertella (Rebel, 1919)
- Proutia betulina (Zeller, 1839)
- Proutia rotunda Suomalainen, 1990
- Pseudobankesia caucasica (I.Kozhantshikov, 1956)
- Psyche baikalensis (Raigorodskaia, 1965)
- Psyche casta (Pallas, 1767)
- Psyche crassiorella (Bruand, 1851)
- Psyche ghilarovi (Solanikov, 1991)
- Psyche kunashirica Solanikov, 2000
- Psychidea alba Solanikov, 1990
- Psychidea nudella (Ochsenheimer, 1810)
- Psychocentra millierei (Heylaerts, 1879)
- Ptilocephala muscella ([Denis & Schiffermüller], 1775)
- Ptilocephala plumifera (Ochsenheimer, 1810)
- Rebelia catandella Solanikov, 1998
- Rebelia herrichiella Strand, 1912
- Rebelia nocturnella (Alphéraky, 1876)
- Reisseronia staudingeri (Heylaerts, 1879)
- Siederia cembrella (Linnaeus, 1761)
- Siederia pineti (Zeller, 1852)
- Siederia rupicolella (Sauter, 1954)
- Sterrhopterix fusca (Haworth, 1809)
- Sterrhopterix sachalina Matsumura, 1931
- Sterrhopterix standfussi (Wocke, 1851)
- Taleporia borealis Wocke, 1862
- Taleporia euxina Zagulajev, 1997
- Taleporia politella (Ochsenheimee, 1816)
- Taleporia tubulosa (Retzius, 1783)
- Typhonia alla (Zolotuhin & Prokovjev, 1998)
- Typhonia korbi (Rebel, 1906)
- Typhonia multivenosa (I.Kozhantshikov, 1956)
- Typhonia punctata (Herrich-Schäffer, 1855)
- Whittleia undulella (Fischer von Röslerstamm, [1837])

== Gracillarioidea ==
=== Roeslerstammiidae ===
- Roeslerstammia erxlebella (Fabricius, 1787)
- Roeslerstammia pronubella ([Denis & Schiffermüller], 1775)

=== Douglasiidae ===
- Klimeschia transversella (Zeller, 1839)
- Tinagma balteolellum (Fischer von Röslerstamm, [1841])
- Tinagma columbellum (Staudinger, 1880)
- Tinagma dryadis Staudinger, 1872
- Tinagma matutinellum Zeller, 1872
- Tinagma minutissima (Staudinger, 1880)
- Tinagma mongolicum Gaedike, 1991
- Tinagma ocnerostomellum (Stainton, 1850)
- Tinagma perdicellum Zeller, 1839
- Tinagma signatum Gaedike, 1991

=== Bucculatricidae ===
- Bucculatrix abdita Seksjaeva, 1989
- Bucculatrix abrepta Seksjaeva, 1989
- Bucculatrix absinthii Gartner, 1865
- Bucculatrix albedinella (Zeller, 1839)
- Bucculatrix albella Stainton, 1867
- Bucculatrix altera Seksjaeva, 1989
- Bucculatrix anthemidella Deschka, 1992
- Bucculatrix applicita Seksjaeva, 1989
- Bucculatrix aquila Seksjaeva, 1992
- Bucculatrix argentisignella Herrich-Schäffer, 1855
- Bucculatrix armata Seksjaeva, 1989
- Bucculatrix armeniaca Deschka, 1992
- Bucculatrix artemisiella Herrich-Schäffer, 1855
- Bucculatrix bechsteinella (Bechstein & Scharfenberg, 1805)
- Bucculatrix bicinica Seksjaeva, 1992
- Bucculatrix bifida Seksjaeva, 1989
- Bucculatrix bisucla Seksjaeva, 1989
- Bucculatrix cidarella (Zeller, 1839)
- Bucculatrix citima Seksjaeva, 1989
- Bucculatrix comporabile Seksjaeva, 1989
- Bucculatrix cristatella (Zeller, 1839)
- Bucculatrix demaryella (Duponchel, 1840)
- Bucculatrix eclecta Braun, 1963
- Bucculatrix frangutella (Goeze, 1783)
- Bucculatrix gnaphaliella (Treitschke, 1833)
- Bucculatrix humiliella Herrich-Schäffer, 1855
- Bucculatrix laciniatella Benander, 1931
- Bucculatrix latviaella Sulcs, 1990
- Bucculatrix locuples Meyrick, 1919
- Bucculatrix lovtsovae Baryshnikova, 2013
- Bucculatrix lustrella Snellen, 1884
- Bucculatrix maritima Stainton, 1851
- Bucculatrix nigricomella (Zeller, 1839)
- Bucculatrix noltei Petry, 1912
- Bucculatrix nota Seksjaeva, 1989
- Bucculatrix notella Seksjaeva, 1996
- Bucculatrix parasimilis Baryshnikova, 2005
- Bucculatrix pectinifera Baryshnikova, 2007
- Bucculatrix pyrivorella Kuroko, 1964
- Bucculatrix ratisbonensis Stainton, 1861
- Bucculatrix similis Baryshnikova, 2005
- Bucculatrix sinevi Seksjaeva, 1988
- Bucculatrix splendida Seksjaeva, 1992
- Bucculatrix telavivella Amsel, 1935
- Bucculatrix thoracella (Thunberg, 1794)
- Bucculatrix transversella Caradja, 1920
- Bucculatrix ulmella Zeller, 1848
- Bucculatrix ulmicola Kuznetzov, 1962
- Bucculatrix ulmifoliae Hering, 1931
- Bucculatrix ussurica Seksjaeva, 1996
- Bucculatrix varia Seksjaeva, 1989

=== Gracillariidae ===
- Acrocercops amurensis Kuznetzov, 1960
- Acrocercops brongniardella (Fabricius, 1798)
- Acrocercops infuscatus Caradja, 1920
- Acrocercops transecta Meyrick, 1931
- Aristaea bathracma (Meyrick, 1912)
- Aristaea kumatai Kuroko, 1982
- Aristaea pavoniella (Zeller, 1847)
- Aspilapteryx limosella (Duponchel, 1844)
- Aspilapteryx tringipennella (Zeller, 1839)
- Callisto albicinctella Kuznetzov, 1979
- Callisto coffeella (Zetterstedt, 1839)
- Callisto denticulella (Thunberg, 1794)
- Callisto elegantella Kuznetzov, 1979
- Callisto insperatella (Nickerl, 1864)
- Caloptilia acericola Kumata, 1966
- Caloptilia aceris Kumata, 1966
- Caloptilia alchimiella (Scopoli, 1763)
- Caloptilia alni Kumata, 1966
- Caloptilia alnivorella Chambers, 1875
- Caloptilia azaleella (Brants, 1913)
- Caloptilia betulicola (Hering, 1928)
- Caloptilia cuculipennella (Hübner, 1796)
- Caloptilia elongella (Linnaeus, 1761)
- Caloptilia falconipennella (Hübner, [1813])
- Caloptilia fidella (Reutti, 1853)
- Caloptilia flava (Staudinger, 1871)
- Caloptilia fribergensis (Fritzsche, 1871)
- Caloptilia gloriosa Kumata, 1966
- Caloptilia hemidactylella ([Denis & Schiffermüller], 1775)
- Caloptilia heringi Kumata, 1966
- Caloptilia hidakensis Kumata, 1966
- Caloptilia honoratella (Rebel, 1914)
- Caloptilia issikii Kumata, 1982
- Caloptilia kisoensis Kumata, 1982
- Caloptilia korbiella (Caradja, 1920)
- Caloptilia leucothoes Kumata, 1982
- Caloptilia mandschurica (Christoph, 1882)
- Caloptilia monticola Kumata, 1966
- Caloptilia onustella (Hübner, [1813])
- Caloptilia orientalis Ermolaev, 1979
- Caloptilia populetorum (Zeller, 1839)
- Caloptilia pulverea Kumata, 1966
- Caloptilia pyrrhaspis (Meyrick, 1931)
- Caloptilia robustella Jackh, 1972
- Caloptilia roscipennella (Hübner, 1796)
- Caloptilia rufipennella (Hübner, 1796)
- Caloptilia sachalinella Ermolaev, 1984
- Caloptilia sapporella (Matsumura, 1931)
- Caloptilia schisandrae Kumata, 1966
- Caloptilia semifascia (Haworth, 1828)
- Caloptilia stigmatella (Fabricius, 1781)
- Caloptilia suberinella (Tengstrom, 1848)
- Caloptilia ulmi Kumata, 1982
- Caloptilia variegata Kuznetzov & Baryshnikova, 2001
- Calybites magnifica (Stainton, 1867)
- Calybites phasianipennella (Hübner, [1813])
- Calybites quadrisignella (Zeller, 1839)
- Calybites securinella (Ermolaev, 1986)
- Cameraria acericola Kumata, 1963
- Cameraria niphonica Kumata, 1963
- Cameraria ohridella Deschka & Dimic, 1986
- Chrysaster hagicola Kumata, 1961
- Cryptolectica chrysalis Kumata & Ermolaev, 1988
- Cupedia cupediella (Herrich-Schäffer, 1855)
- Dialectica imperialella (Zeller, 1847)
- Dialectica scalariella (Zeller, 1850)
- Epicephala relictella Kuznetzov, 1979
- Eteoryctis deversa (Meyrick, 1922)
- Euspilapteryx aureola (Kumata, 1982)
- Euspilapteryx auroguttella (Stephens, 1835)
- Gracillaria albicapitata Issiki, 1930
- Gracillaria arsenievi (Ermolaev, 1977)
- Gracillaria loriolella Frey, 1881
- Gracillaria syringella (Fabricius, 1794)
- Gracillaria ussuriella (Ermolaev, 1977)
- Hyloconis improvisella (Ermo1aev, 1986)
- Hyloconis lespedezae Kumata, 1963
- Hyloconis puerariae Kumata, 1963
- Leucospilapteryx anaphalidis Kumata, 1965
- Leucospilapteryx omissella (Stainton, 1848)
- Liocrobyla desmodiella Kuroko, 1982
- Micrurapteryx gerasimovi Ermolaev, 1989
- Micrurapteryx gradatella (Herrich-Schäffer, 1855)
- Micrurapteryx kollariella (Zeller, 1839)
- Ornixola caudulatella (Zeller, 1839)
- Parectopa ononidis (Zeller, 1839)
- Parornix alni Kumata, 1965
- Parornix altaica Noreika & Bidzilya, 2006
- Parornix anglicella (Stainton, 1850)
- Parornix anguliferella (Zeller, 1847)
- Parornix avellanella (Stainton, 1854)
- Parornix carpinella (Frey, 1863)
- Parornix devoniella (Stainton, 1850)
- Parornix ermolaevi Kuznetzov, 1979
- Parornix extrema Kuznetzov & Baryshnikova, 2003
- Parornix fagivora (Frey, 1861)
- Parornix finitimella (Zeller, 1850)
- Parornix fumidella Kuznetzov, 1979
- Parornix kumatai Ermolaev, 1993
- Parornix loganella (Stainton, 1848)
- Parornix maliphaga Kuznetzov, 1979
- Parornix mixta (Triberti, 1980)
- Parornix multimaculata (Matsumura, 1931)
- Parornix petiolella (Frey, 1863)
- Parornix polygrammella (Wocke, 1862)
- Parornix retrusella Kuznetzov, 1979
- Parornix scoticella (Stainton, 1850)
- Parornix szoecsi (Gozmány, 1952)
- Parornix torquillella (Zeller, 1850)
- Parornix traugotti Svensson, 1976
- Phyllocnistis chlorantica Seksjaeva, 1992
- Phyllocnistis cornella Ermolaev, 1987
- Phyllocnistis extrematrix Martynova, 1955
- Phyllocnistis labyrinthella (Bjerkander, 1790)
- Phyllocnistis saligna (Zeller, 1839)
- Phyllocnistis unipunctella (Stephens, 1834)
- Phyllocnistis valentinensis Hering, 1936
- Phyllocnistis vitella Ermolaev, 1987
- Phyllonorycter platani (Staudinger, 1870)
- Phyllonorycter acerifoliella (Zeller, 1839)
- Phyllonorycter acutissimae (Kumata, 1963)
- Phyllonorycter agilella (Zeller, 1846)
- Phyllonorycter anderidae (W.Fletcher, 1875)
- Phyllonorycter apparella (Herrich-Schäffer, 1855)
- Phyllonorycter bicinctella (Matsumura, 1931)
- Phyllonorycter blancardella (Fabricius, 1781)
- Phyllonorycter caraganella (Ermo1aev, 1986)
- Phyllonorycter carpini (Kumata, 1963)
- Phyllonorycter cavella (Ze11er, 1846)
- Phyllonorycter celtidis (Kumata, 1963)
- Phyllonorycter cerasicolella (Herrich-Schäffer, 1855)
- Phyllonorycter comparella (Duponchel, 1843)
- Phyllonorycter connexella (Zeller, 1846)
- Phyllonorycter coryli (Nicelli, 1851)
- Phyllonorycter corylifoliella (Hübner, 1796)
- Phyllonorycter cretata (Kumata, 1957)
- Phyllonorycter cydoniella ([Denis & Schiffermüller], 1775)
- Phyllonorycter dakekanbae (Kumata, 1963)
- Phyllonorycter dubitella (Herrich-Schäffer, 1855)
- Phyllonorycter emberizaepennella (Bouche, 1834)
- Phyllonorycter ermani (Kumata, 1963)
- Phyllonorycter esperella (Goeze, 1783)
- Phyllonorycter froelichiella (Zeller, 1839)
- Phyllonorycter fruticosella (Kuznetzov, 1979)
- Phyllonorycter gerasimowi (M.Hering, 1930)
- Phyllonorycter ginnalae (Ermolaev, 1981)
- Phyllonorycter gracilis Noreika, 1994
- Phyllonorycter harrisella (Linnaeus, 1761)
- Phyllonorycter heegeriella (Zeller, 1846)
- Phyllonorycter hilarella (Zetterstedt, 1839)
- Phyllonorycter insignitella (Zeller, 1846)
- Phyllonorycter issikii (Kumata, 1963)
- Phyllonorycter japonica (Kumata, 1963)
- Phyllonorycter jezoniella (Matsumura, 1931)
- Phyllonorycter joannisi (Le Marchand, 1936)
- Phyllonorycter jozanae (Kumata, 1967)
- Phyllonorycter junoniella (Zeller, 1846)
- Phyllonorycter kisoensis Kumata & Park, 1978
- Phyllonorycter klemannella (Fabricius, 1781)
- Phyllonorycter kuhlweiniella (Zeller, 1839)
- Phyllonorycter kuznetzovi (Ermolaev, 1982)
- Phyllonorycter laciniatae (Kumata, 1967)
- Phyllonorycter lantanella (Schrank, 1802)
- Phyllonorycter laurocerasi (Kuznetzov, 1979)
- Phyllonorycter lautella (Zeller, 1846)
- Phyllonorycter macrantherella (Kuznetzov, 1961)
- Phyllonorycter maestingella (Muller, 1764)
- Phyllonorycter malella (Gerasimov, 1931)
- Phyllonorycter malicola (Kuznetzov, 1979)
- Phyllonorycter matsudai (Kumata, 1986)
- Phyllonorycter medicaginella (Gerasimov, 1930)
- Phyllonorycter melacoronis (Kumata, 1963)
- Phyllonorycter messaniella (Zeller, 1846)
- Phyllonorycter mongolicae (Kumata, 1963)
- Phyllonorycter muelleriella (Zeller, 1839)
- Phyllonorycter nicellii (Stainton, 1851)
- Phyllonorycter nigrescentella (Logan, 1851)
- Phyllonorycter nigristella (Kumata, 1957)
- Phyllonorycter nipponicella (Issiki, 1930)
- Phyllonorycter orientalis (Kumata, 1963)
- Phyllonorycter oxyacanthae (Frey, 1856)
- Phyllonorycter pastorella (Zeller, 1846)
- Phyllonorycter pomiella (Gerasimov, 1933)
- Phyllonorycter populi (Filipjev, 1931)
- Phyllonorycter populialbae (Kuznetzov, 1961)
- Phyllonorycter populifoliella (Treitschke, 1833)
- Phyllonorycter pseudojezoniella Noreika, 1994
- Phyllonorycter pseudolautella (Kumata, 1963)
- Phyllonorycter pterocaryae (Kumata, 1963)
- Phyllonorycter pumilae (Ermolaev, 1981)
- Phyllonorycter pyrifoliella (Gerasimov, 1933)
- Phyllonorycter quercifoliella (Zeller, 1839)
- Phyllonorycter quinqueguttella (Stainton, 1851)
- Phyllonorycter rajella (Linnaeus, 1758)
- Phyllonorycter reduncata (Ermolaev, 1986)
- Phyllonorycter ringoniella (Matsumura, 1931)
- Phyllonorycter roboris (Zeller, 1839)
- Phyllonorycter rolandi (Svensson, 1966)
- Phyllonorycter sagitella (Bjerkander, 1790)
- Phyllonorycter salicicolella (Sircom, 1848)
- Phyllonorycter salictella (Zeller, 1846)
- Phyllonorycter schreberella (Fabricius, 1781)
- Phyllonorycter scitulella (Duponchel, 1843)
- Phyllonorycter scopariella (Zeller, 1846)
- Phyllonorycter sibirica Kuznetzov & Baryshnikova, 2001
- Phyllonorycter similis Kumata, 1982
- Phyllonorycter sorbi (Frey, 1855)
- Phyllonorycter sorbicola (Kumata, 1963)
- Phyllonorycter spinicolella (Zeller, 1846)
- Phyllonorycter stettinensis (Nicelli, 1852)
- Phyllonorycter strigulatella (Lienig & Zeller, 1846)
- Phyllonorycter suberifoliella (Zeller, 1850)
- Phyllonorycter takagii (Kumata, 1963)
- Phyllonorycter tenerella (de Joannis, 1915)
- Phyllonorycter trifasciella (Haworth, 1828)
- Phyllonorycter trifoliella (Gerasimov, 1933)
- Phyllonorycter tristrigella (Haworth, 1828)
- Phyllonorycter turanica (Gerasimov, 1931)
- Phyllonorycter uchidai (Kumata, 1963)
- Phyllonorycter ulmi (Kumata, 1963)
- Phyllonorycter ulmifoliella (Hübner, [1817])
- Phyllonorycter valentina (Ermolaev, 1981)
- Phyllonorycter viciae (Kumata, 1963)
- Phyllonorycter viminetorum (Stainton, 1854)
- Phyllonorycter watanabei (Kumata, 1963)
- Povolnya leucapennella (Stephens, 1835)
- Psydrocercops wisteriae (Kuroko, 1982)
- Sauterina hofmanniella (Schleich, 1867)
- Spulerina astaurota (Meyrick, 1922)
- Spulerina castaneae Kumata & Kuroko, 1988
- Spulerina corticicola Kumata, 1964
- Spulerina dissotoma (Meyrick, 1931)
- Telamoptilia tiliae Kumata & Kuroko, 1988

== Yponomeutoidea ==
=== Yponomeutidae ===
- Argyresthia abdominalis Zeller, 1839
- Argyresthia albistria (Haworth, 1828)
- Argyresthia arceuthina Zeller, 1839
- Argyresthia aurulentella Stainton, 1849
- Argyresthia bergiella (Ratzeburg, 1840)
- Argyresthia bonnetella (Linnaeus, 1758)
- Argyresthia brockeella (Hübner, [1813])
- Argyresthia conjugella Zeller, 1839
- Argyresthia curvella (Linnaeus, 1761)
- Argyresthia dilectella Zeller, 1847
- Argyresthia fundella (Fischer von Röslerstamm, [1835])
- Argyresthia glabratella (Zel1er, 1847)
- Argyresthia glaucinella Zeller, 1839
- Argyresthia goedartella (Linnaeus, 1758)
- Argyresthia illuminatella Zeller, 1839
- Argyresthia ivella (Haworth, 1828)
- Argyresthia kurentzovi Gershenson, 1988
- Argyresthia laevigatella (Heydenreich, 1851)
- Argyresthia praecocella Zeller, 1839
- Argyresthia pruniella (Clerck, 1759)
- Argyresthia pulchella Lienig & Zeller, 1846
- Argyresthia pygmaeella ([Denis & Schiffermüller], 1775)
- Argyresthia retinella Zeller, 1839
- Argyresthia semifavella Christoph, 1882
- Argyresthia semifusca (Haworth, 1828)
- Argyresthia semitestacella (Curtis, 1833)
- Argyresthia sorbiella (Treitschke, 1833)
- Argyresthia spinosella Stainton, 1849
- Argyresthia submontana Frey, 1871
- Atemelia torquatella (Lienig & Zeller, 1846)
- Cedestis gysseleniella Zeller, 1839
- Cedestis piniariella Zeller, 1847
- Cedestis subfasciella (Stephens, 1834)
- Euhyponomeuta secunda Moriuti, 1977
- Euhyponomeuta stannella (Thunberg, 1794)
- Euhyponomeutoides albithoracellus Gaj, 1954
- Euhyponomeutoides ribesiellus (de Joannis, 1900)
- Euhyponomeutoides trachydelta (Meyrick, 1931)
- Kessleria alternans (Staudinger, 1870)
- Kessleria caflischiella (Frey, 1880)
- Kessleria caucasica Friese, 1960
- Kessleria fasciapennella (Stainton, 1849)
- Kessleria saxifragae (Stainton, 1868)
- Ocnerostoma friesei Svensson, 1966
- Paraswammerdamia albicapitella (Scharfenberg, 1805)
- Paraswammerdamia conspersella (Tengstrom, 1848)
- Paraswammerdamia lapponica (W.Petersen, 1932)
- Paraswammerdamia lutarea (Haworth, 1828)
- Paraswammerdamia ornichella Friese, 1960
- Prays beta Moriuti, 1977
- Prays fraxinella (Bjerkander, 1784)
- Prays ruficeps (Heinemann, 1854)
- Pseudoswammerdamia combinella (Hübner, 1786)
- Saridoscelis kodamai Moriuti, 1961
- Scythropia crataegella (Linnaeus, 1767)
- Swammerdamia caesiella (Huner, 1796)
- Swammerdamia compunctella Herrich-Schäffer, 1851
- Swammerdamia glaucella Junnilainen, 2001
- Swammerdamia passerella (Zetterstedt, 1839)
- Swammerdamia pyrella (De Villers, 1789)
- Xyrosaris lichneuta Meyrick, 1918
- Yponomeuta anatolicus Stringer, 1930
- Yponomeuta cagnagella (Hübner, [1813])
- Yponomeuta catharotis Meyrick, 1935
- Yponomeuta cinefactus Meyrick, 1935
- Yponomeuta diffluellus Heinemann, 1870
- Yponomeuta eurinellus Zagulajev, 1969
- Yponomeuta evonymella (Linnaeus, 1758)
- Yponomeuta falkovitshi Gershenson, 1998
- Yponomeuta gershensoni Sinev, 2007
- Yponomeuta griseomaculatus Gershenson, 1969
- Yponomeuta irrorella (Hübner, 1796)
- Yponomeuta kostjuki Gershenson, 1985
- Yponomeuta malinella Zeller, 1838
- Yponomeuta nigrifimbriatus Christoph, 1882
- Yponomeuta orientalis Zagulajev, 1969
- Yponomeuta padella (Linnaeus, 1758)
- Yponomeuta pauciflore Efremov, 1969
- Yponomeuta plumbella ([Denis & Schiffermüller], 1775)
- Yponomeuta polystictus Butler, 1879
- Yponomeuta polystigmellus Felder & Felder, 1862
- Yponomeuta refrigeratus Meyrick, 1931
- Yponomeuta rorrella (Hübner, 1796)
- Yponomeuta vigintipunctatus (Retzius, 1783)
- Zelleria hepariella Stainton, 1849
- Zelleria silvicolella Moriuti, 1977

=== Ypsolophidae ===
- Ochsenheimeria capella Moschler, 1860
- Ochsenheimeria mediopectinella (Haworth, 1828)
- Ochsenheimeria taurella ([Denis & Schiffermüller], 1775)
- Ochsenheimeria urella Fischer von Röslerstamm, [1842]
- Ochsenheimeria vacculella Fischer von Röslerstamm, [1842]
- Phrealcia ussuriensis (Rebel, 1901)
- Ypsolopha acuminata (Butler, 1878)
- Ypsolopha affinitella (Staudinger, 1892)
- Ypsolopha albiramella (Mann, 1861)
- Ypsolopha albistriata (Issiki, 1930)
- Ypsolopha alpella ([Denis & Schiffermüller], 1775)
- Ypsolopha amoenella (Christoph, 1882)
- Ypsolopha asperella (Linnaeus, 1761)
- Ypsolopha blandella (Christoph, 1882)
- Ypsolopha chazariella (Mann, 1866)
- Ypsolopha contractella (Caradja, 1920)
- Ypsolopha coriacella (Herrich-Schäffer, 1855)
- Ypsolopha costibasella Caradja, 1939
- Ypsolopha cristata Moriuti, 1977
- Ypsolopha dentella (Fabricius, 1775)
- Ypsolopha ephedrella Christoph, 1873
- Ypsolopha falcella ([Denis & Schiffermüller], 1775)
- Ypsolopha horridella (Treitschke, 1835)
- Ypsolopha leuconotella (Snellen, 1884)
- Ypsolopha longa Moriuti, 1964
- Ypsolopha lucella (Fabricius, 1775)
- Ypsolopha melanofuscella Ponomarenko & Zinchenko, 2013
- Ypsolopha mucronella (Scopoli, 1763)
- Ypsolopha nebulella (Staudinger, 1871)
- Ypsolopha nemorella (Linnaeus, 1758)
- Ypsolopha nigrofasciata Yang, 1977
- Ypsolopha nigrimaculata Byun & Park, 2001
- Ypsolopha parallela (Caradja, 1939)
- Ypsolopha parenthesella (Linnaeus, 1761)
- Ypsolopha persicella (Fabricius, 1787)
- Ypsolopha sarmaticella (Rebel, 1917)
- Ypsolopha satellitella (Staudinger, 1871)
- Ypsolopha scabrella (Linnaeus, 1761)
- Ypsolopha seniculella (Christoph, 1872)
- Ypsolopha sequella (Clerck, 1759)
- Ypsolopha straminella Ponomarenko & Zinchenko, 2013
- Ypsolopha strigosa (Butler, 1879)
- Ypsolopha sylvella (Linnaeus, 1767)
- Ypsolopha tsugae Moriuti, 1977
- Ypsolopha uniformis (Filipjev, 1929)
- Ypsolopha ustella (Clerck, 1759)
- Ypsolopha vittella (Linnaeus, 1758)
- Ypsolopha yasudai Moriuti, 1964

=== Plutellidae ===
- Eidophasia albifasciata lssiki, 1930
- Eidophasia hufnagelii (Zeller, 1839)
- Eidophasia messingiella (Fischer von Röslerstamm, [1840])
- Plutella xylostella (Linnaeus, 1758)
- Plutelloptera hyperboreella (Strand, 1902)
- Plutelloptera kyrkella Baraniak, 2007
- Plutelloptera mariae (Rebel, 1923)
- Pseudoplutella porrectella (Linnaeus, 1758)
- Rhigognostis annulatella Zeller, 1857
- Rhigognostis incarnatella (Steude1, 1873)
- Rhigognostis japonica (Moriuti, 1977)
- Rhigognostis kuusamoensis Kyrki, 1989
- Rhigognostis schmaltzella (Zetterstedt, 1839)
- Rhigognostis senilella (Zetterstedt, 1839)
- Rhigognostis sibirica Kyrki, 1989

=== Acrolepiidae ===
- Acrolepia autumnitella Curtis, 1838
- Acrolepiopsis assectella (Zeller, 1839)
- Acrolepiopsis betulella (Curtis, 1850)
- Acrolepiopsis clavivalvatella Moriuti, 1972
- Acrolepiopsis delta (Moriuti, 1961)
- Acrolepiopsis issikiella (Moriuti, 1961)
- Acrolepiopsis kostjuki Budashkin, 1998
- Acrolepiopsis luteocapitella (Caradja, 1926)
- Acrolepiopsis orchidophaga Moriuti, 1982
- Acrolepiopsis peterseni Gaedike, 1994
- Acrolepiopsis postomacula (Matsumura, 1931)
- Acrolepiopsis sapporensis (Matsumura, 1931)
- Acrolepiopsis sinense Gaedike, 1971
- Acrolepiopsis sinjovi Gaedike, 1994
- Acrolepiopsis ussurica Zagulajev, 1981
- Digitivalva arnicella (Heyden, 1863)
- Digitivalva christophi (Toll, 1958)
- Digitivalva orientella (Klimesch, 1956)
- Digitivalva pulicariae (Klimesch, 1956)
- Digitivalva reticulella (Hübner, 1796)
- Digitivalva sibirica (Toll, 1958)
- Digitivalva solidaginis (Staudinger, 1859)
- Digitivalva valeriella (Snellen, 1878)
- Digitivalvopsis paradoxa (Moriuti, 1982)

=== Glyphipterigidae ===
- Glyphipterix argyroguttella Ragonot, 1885
- Glyphipterix basifasciata Issiki, 1930
- Glyphipterix bergstraesserella (Fabricius, 1781)
- Glyphipterix beta Moriuti & Saito, 1964
- Glyphipterix equitella (Scopoli, 1763)
- Glyphipterix forsterella (Fabricius, 1781)
- Glyphipterix funditrix Diakonoff & Arita, 1976
- Glyphipterix gianelliella Ragonot, 1885
- Glyphipterix haworthana (Stephens, 1834)
- Glyphipterix japonicella Zeller, 1877
- Glyphipterix loricatella (Treitschke, 1833)
- Glyphipterix magnatella Erschoff, 1877
- Glyphipterix maritima Diakonoff, 1979
- Glyphipterix nigromarginata Issiki, 1930
- Glyphipterix regula Diakonoff & Arita, 1976
- Glyphipterix schoenicolella Boyd, 1859
- Glyphipterix simplicella Christoph, 1882
- Glyphipterix simpliciella (Stephens, 1834)
- Glyphipterix speculiferella Christoph, 1882
- Glyphipterix thrasonella (Scopoli, 1763)
- Lepidotarphius perornatella (Walker, 1864)
- Orthotelia sparganella (Thunberg, 1788)

=== Heliodinidae ===
- Heliodines roesella (Linnaeus, 1758)

=== Lyonetiidae ===
- Leucoptera ermolaevi Seksjaeva, 1990
- Leucoptera heringiella Toll, 1938
- Leucoptera laburnella (Stainton, 1851)
- Leucoptera lotella (Stainton, 1859)
- Leucoptera lustratella (Herrich-Schäffer, 1855)
- Leucoptera malifoliella (Costa, [1836])
- Leucoptera spartifoliella (Hübner, [1813])
- Leucoptera ussuriella Seksjaeva, 1988
- Lyonetia castaneella Kuroko, 1964
- Lyonetia clerkella (Linnaeus, 1758)
- Lyonetia ledi Wocke, 1859
- Lyonetia prunifoliella (Hübner, 1796)
- Lyonetia pulverulentella Zeller, 1839
- Microthauma lespedezella Seksjaeva, 1990
- Paraleucoptera sinuella (Reutti, 1853)
- Proleucoptera celastrella Kuroko, 1964

=== Bedelliidae ===
- Bedellia somnulentella (Zeller, 1847)
