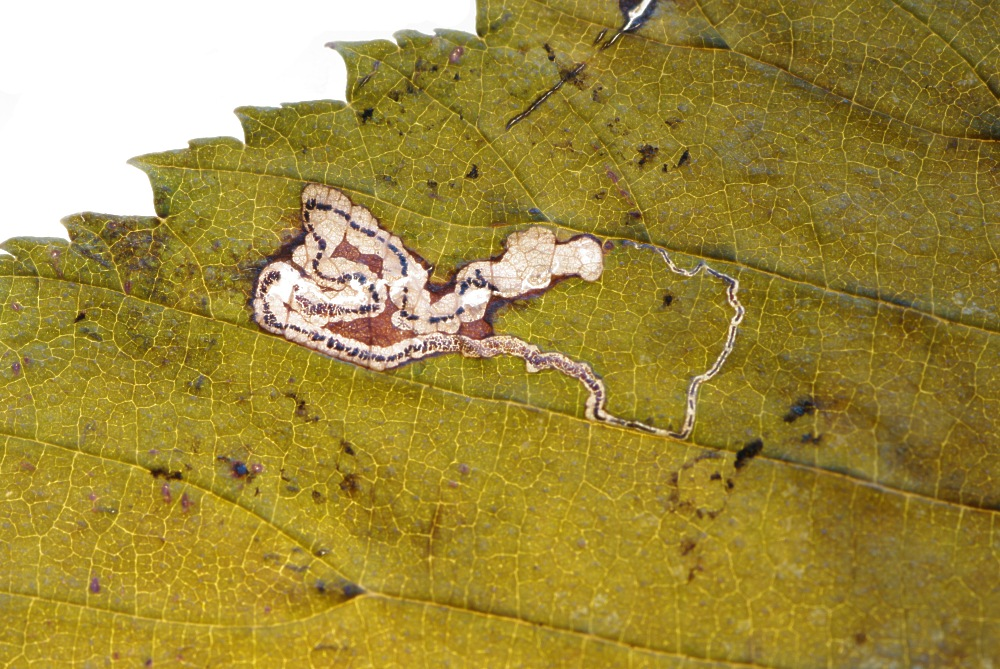

Scientific classification
- Kingdom: Animalia
- Phylum: Arthropoda
- Class: Insecta
- Order: Lepidoptera
- Family: Nepticulidae
- Genus: Stigmella
- Species: S. ulmiphaga

Binomial name
- Stigmella ulmiphaga (Preissecker, 1942)

Synonyms
- Nepticula ulmiphaga Preissecker, 1942

= Stigmella ulmiphaga =

Species of moth

Stigmella ulmiphaga is a moth of the family Nepticulidae. It is found in central Europe (Austria, the Czech Republic, Hungary, Slovakia) and Greece. It is also known from Turkmenistan.

The larvae feed on Ulmus species. They mine the leaves of their host plant. The mine is very similar to the mines of Stigmella ulmivora and Stigmella kazakhstanica.
