= Stigmella monticulella =

Scientific classification
- Kingdom: Animalia
- Phylum: Arthropoda
- Class: Insecta
- Order: Lepidoptera
- Family: Nepticulidae
- Genus: Stigmella
- Species: S. monticulella

Binomial name
- Stigmella monticulella Puplesis, 1984

Species of moth

Stigmella monticulella is a moth of the family Nepticulidae. It was described by Puplesis in 1984. It is known from the Russian Far East.

The larvae feed on Lonicera species. They probably mine the leaves of their host plant.
