= Stigmella kozlovi =

Scientific classification
- Kingdom: Animalia
- Phylum: Arthropoda
- Class: Insecta
- Order: Lepidoptera
- Family: Nepticulidae
- Genus: Stigmella
- Species: S. kozlovi

Binomial name
- Stigmella kozlovi Puplesis, 1984

Species of moth

Stigmella kozlovi is a moth of the family Nepticulidae. It is known from the Russian Far East.

The larvae feed on probably Betula dahurica. They probably mine the leaves of their host plant.
