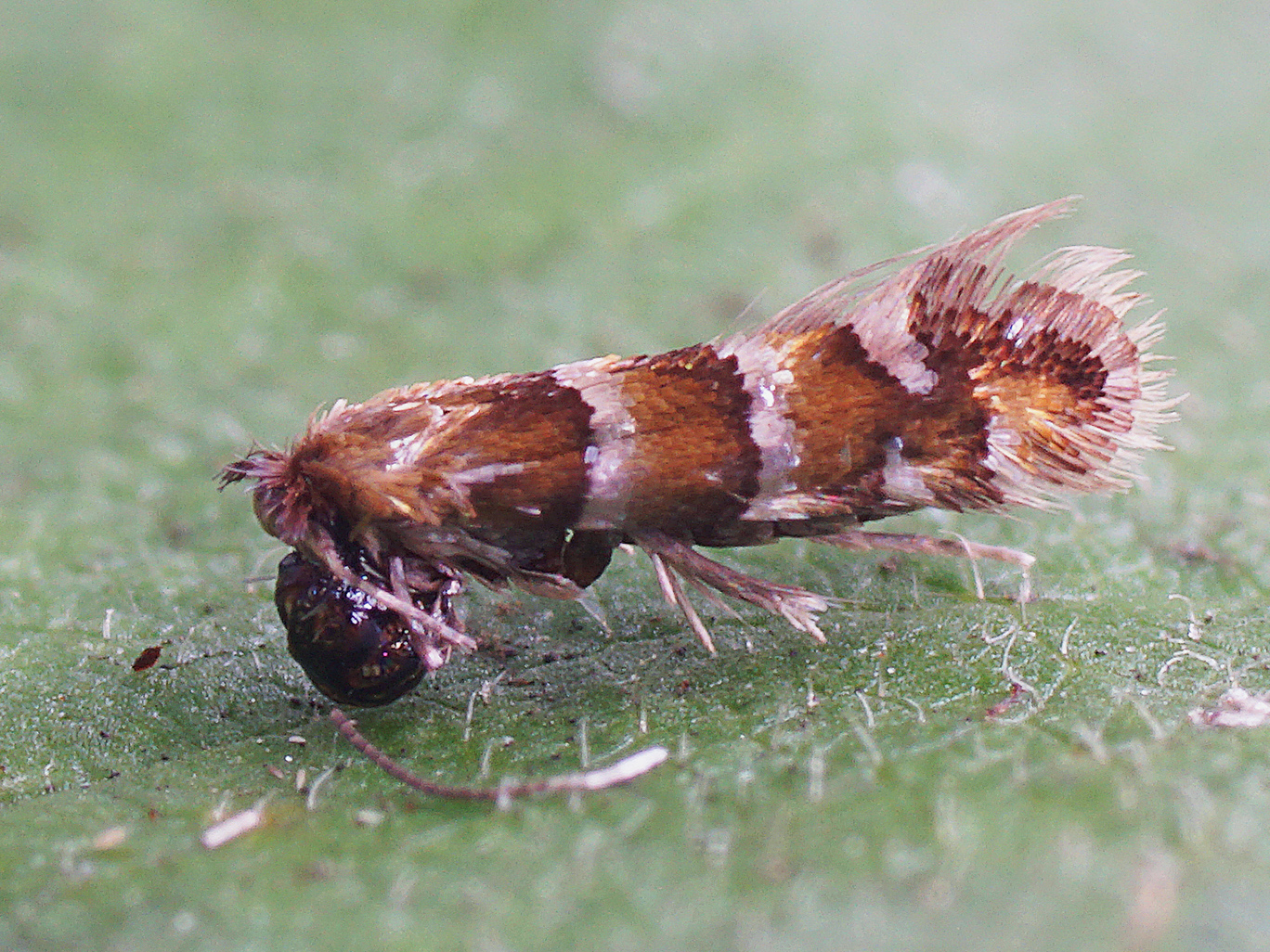

Scientific classification
- Domain: Eukaryota
- Kingdom: Animalia
- Phylum: Arthropoda
- Class: Insecta
- Order: Lepidoptera
- Family: Gracillariidae
- Genus: Phyllonorycter
- Species: P. klemannella

Binomial name
- Phyllonorycter klemannella (Fabricius, 1781)

Synonyms
- Tinea klemannella Fabricius, 1781; Phyllonorycter kleemannella

= Phyllonorycter klemannella =

Species of moth

Phyllonorycter klemannella is a moth of the family Gracillariidae. It is known from all of Europe, except Greece.

The wingspan is 7.5-9.5 mm. The forewings are shining ochreous-orange, sometimes much mixed with dark fuscous; a fascia at 1/4, another at 1/2, two posterior costal and two dorsal wedge-shaped spots silvery-whitish, anteriorly blackish-margined a small round black apical spot. Hindwings are rather dark grey.

The larvae feed on Alnus glutinosa and Alnus incana. They mine the leaves of their host plant.
