= Stigmella micromelis =

Scientific classification
- Kingdom: Animalia
- Phylum: Arthropoda
- Class: Insecta
- Order: Lepidoptera
- Family: Nepticulidae
- Genus: Stigmella
- Species: S. micromelis

Binomial name
- Stigmella micromelis Puplesis, 1985

Species of moth

Stigmella micromelis is a moth of the family Nepticulidae. It was described by Puplesis in 1985. It is known from the Russian Far East.

The larvae feed on Sorbus alnifolia. They probably mine the leaves of their host plant.
