= Bucculatrix eclecta =

Scientific classification
- Kingdom: Animalia
- Phylum: Arthropoda
- Clade: Pancrustacea
- Class: Insecta
- Order: Lepidoptera
- Family: Bucculatricidae
- Genus: Bucculatrix
- Species: B. eclecta

Binomial name
- Bucculatrix eclecta Braun, 1963

Species of moth

Bucculatrix eclecta is a moth in the family Bucculatricidae. It is found in North America, where it has been recorded from Ontario, New York, Maine and Indiana. It is also found in Russia. It was described by Annette Frances Braun in 1963.

The wingspan is 6.5–7 mm. Adults have been recorded on wing from May to June.

The larvae feed on Ulmus pumila.
