= Stigmella lurida =

Scientific classification
- Kingdom: Animalia
- Phylum: Arthropoda
- Class: Insecta
- Order: Lepidoptera
- Family: Nepticulidae
- Genus: Stigmella
- Species: S. lurida

Binomial name
- Stigmella lurida Puplesis, 1994

Species of moth

Stigmella lurida is a moth of the family Nepticulidae. It is found in Tajikistan.

The larvae probably feed on Salix species.
