= Phyllonorycter sibirica =

Scientific classification
- Domain: Eukaryota
- Kingdom: Animalia
- Phylum: Arthropoda
- Class: Insecta
- Order: Lepidoptera
- Family: Gracillariidae
- Genus: Phyllonorycter
- Species: P. sibirica

Binomial name
- Phyllonorycter sibirica Kuznetzov & Baryshnikova, 2001

Species of moth

Phyllonorycter sibirica is a moth of the family Gracillariidae. It is known from the Russian Far East.

The larvae feed on Populus species. They mine the leaves of their host plant.
