= Caloptilia flava =

Scientific classification
- Domain: Eukaryota
- Kingdom: Animalia
- Phylum: Arthropoda
- Class: Insecta
- Order: Lepidoptera
- Family: Gracillariidae
- Genus: Caloptilia
- Species: C. flava

Binomial name
- Caloptilia flava (Staudinger, 1871)

Synonyms
- Gracilaria flava Staudinger, 1871; Caloptilia glycyrrhizae Deschka, 1979

Species of moth

Caloptilia flava is a moth of the family Gracillariidae. It is known from southern Russia and Rhodes.

The larvae feed on Glycyrrhiza echinata. They mine the leaves of their host plant.
