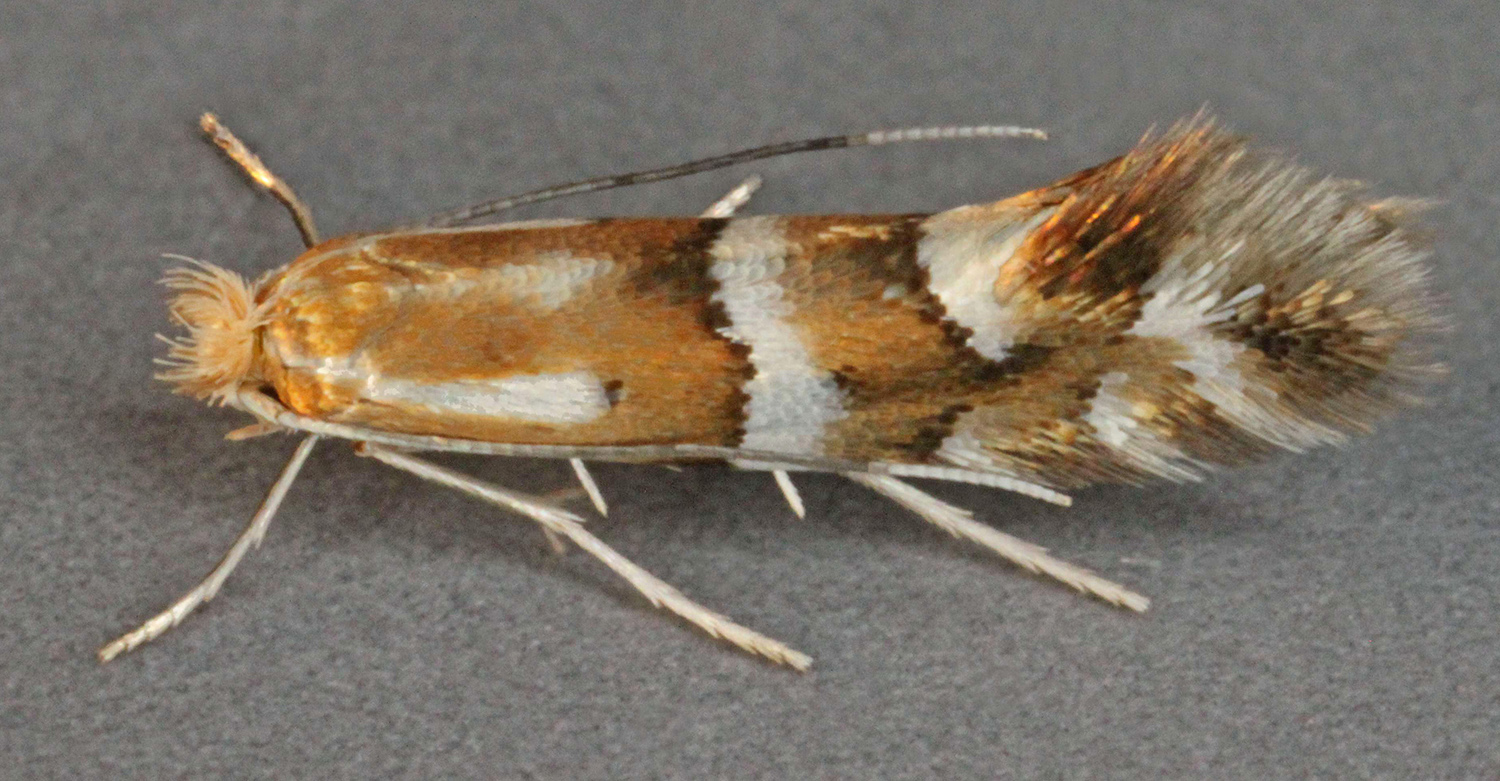

Scientific classification
- Domain: Eukaryota
- Kingdom: Animalia
- Phylum: Arthropoda
- Class: Insecta
- Order: Lepidoptera
- Family: Gracillariidae
- Genus: Phyllonorycter
- Species: P. hilarella

Binomial name
- Phyllonorycter hilarella (Zetterstedt, 1839)

Synonyms
- Elachista hilarella Zetterstedt, 1839; Elachista spinolella Duponchel, 1840

= Phyllonorycter hilarella =

Species of moth

Phyllonorycter hilarella is a moth of the family Gracillariidae. It is found in all of Europe, except the Balkan Peninsula and the Mediterranean Islands.

The wingspan is 7–9 millimetres (0.28–0.35 in).The head is whitish, mixed with fuscous, face white. Antennae with apex white. Forewings are golden-ochreous; a white median streak from base to 1/3 an ill-defined white dorsal spot at 1/4; a slightly bent median fascia, three posterior costal and two dorsal spots white, anteriorly dark-margined; a black apical dot; dark line of cilia nearly obsolete. Hindwings are grey.

There are two generations per year with adults on wing in late May and June and again in August.

The larvae feed on Salix aurita, Salix caprea and Salix cinerea. They mine the leaves of their host plant.
