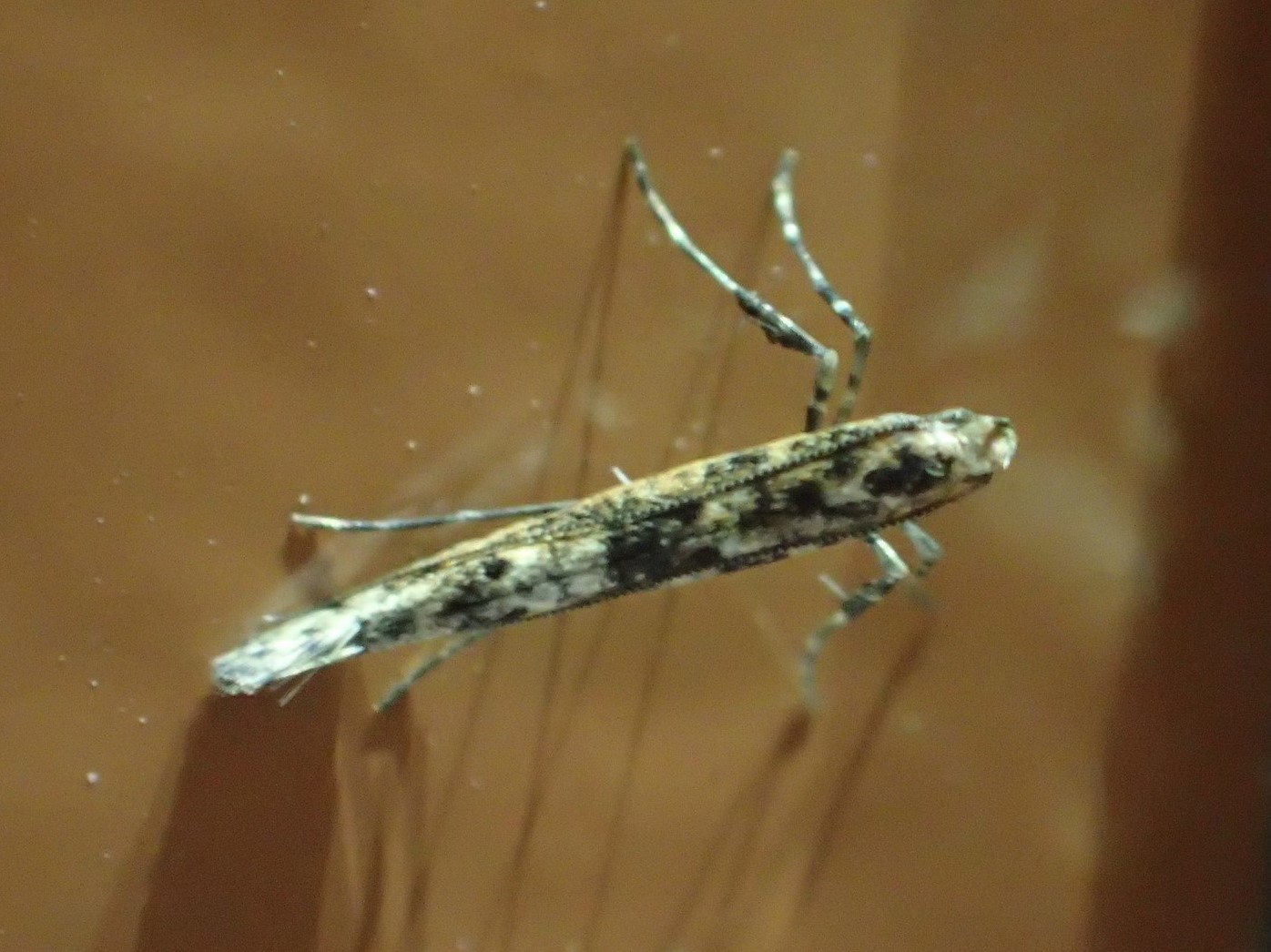

Scientific classification
- Kingdom: Animalia
- Phylum: Arthropoda
- Clade: Pancrustacea
- Class: Insecta
- Order: Lepidoptera
- Family: Gracillariidae
- Genus: Caloptilia
- Species: C. alnivorella

Binomial name
- Caloptilia alnivorella (Chambers, 1875)

= Caloptilia alnivorella =

Alder leafminer

Species of moth

Caloptilia alnivorella, the alder leafminer, is a species of moth in the family Gracillariidae. It was first described by Vactor Tousey Chambers in 1875 and is known from the Russian Far East, Canada (Québec, Nova Scotia, Ontario and the Northwest Territories) and the United States (including Vermont, Utah, Maine, California, Colorado and Michigan).

The wingspan is about 14 mm. Adults overwinter in the fall and come out in the spring to mate.

The larvae feed on Acer negundo, Alnus species (including Alnus crispa var. mollis, Alnus glutinosa, Alnus incana, Alnus japonica, Alnus mollis, Alnus rubra, Alnus tenuifolia and Alnus viridis), Betula papyrifera and Quercus garryana. They mine the leaves of their host plant.
