= Stigmella auricularia =

Scientific classification
- Kingdom: Animalia
- Phylum: Arthropoda
- Class: Insecta
- Order: Lepidoptera
- Family: Nepticulidae
- Genus: Stigmella
- Species: S. auricularia

Binomial name
- Stigmella auricularia Puplesis, Diškus & Juchnevic, 2003

Species of moth

Stigmella auricularia is a moth of the family Nepticulidae. It is known from the southernmost part of Primorskiy Kray in the Khasan District (near the Korean border) in Russia.
