= Stigmella aurora =

Scientific classification
- Kingdom: Animalia
- Phylum: Arthropoda
- Class: Insecta
- Order: Lepidoptera
- Family: Nepticulidae
- Genus: Stigmella
- Species: S. aurora

Binomial name
- Stigmella aurora Puplesis, 1984

Species of moth

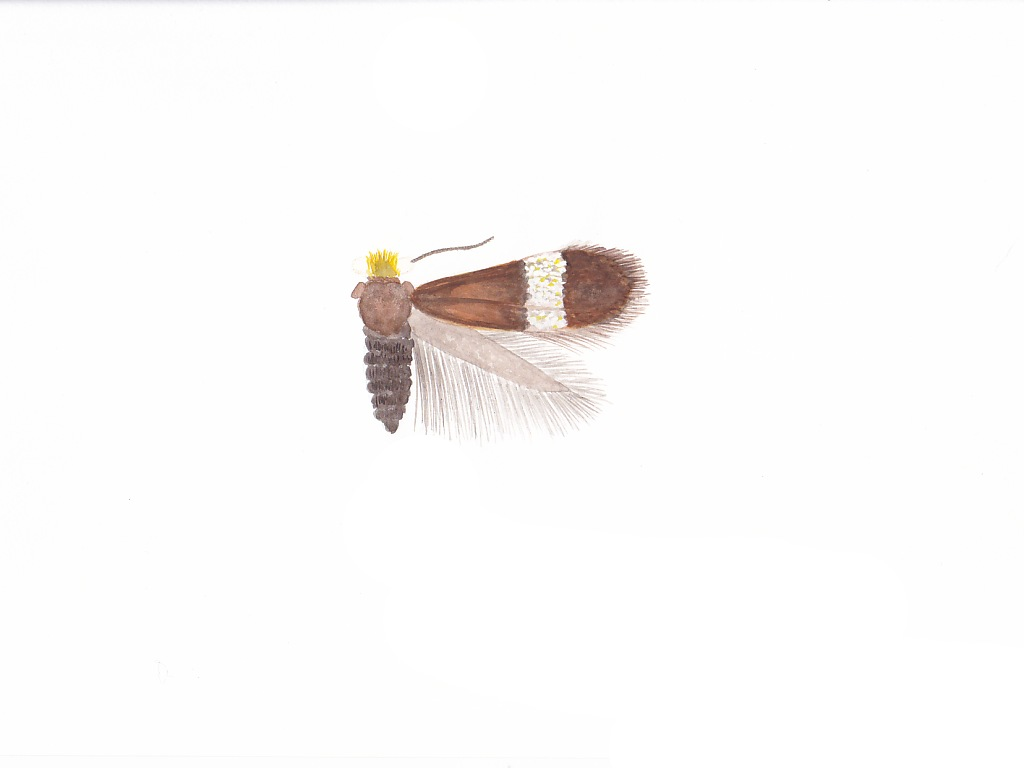
Stigmella aurora

Stigmella aurora is a moth of the family Nepticulidae. It is found in the region from eastern Russia to the eastern part of the Palearctic realm.

The larvae feed on Crataegus pinnatifida. They probably mine the leaves of their host.
