= Phyllonorycter malella =

Scientific classification
- Domain: Eukaryota
- Kingdom: Animalia
- Phylum: Arthropoda
- Class: Insecta
- Order: Lepidoptera
- Family: Gracillariidae
- Genus: Phyllonorycter
- Species: P. malella

Binomial name
- Phyllonorycter malella (Gerasimov, 1931)

Moth of the family Gracillariidae from central Eurasia

Phyllonorycter malella, the apple tentiform leafminer, is a moth of the family Gracillariidae. It is known from Kazakhstan, Kyrgyzstan, Russia (Altai), Tajikistan, Turkmenistan and Uzbekistan.

The larvae feed on Cotoneaster hissarica, Crataegus species (including Crataegus hissarica), Cydonia species (including Cydonia oblonga), Malus species (including Malus domestica, Malus pumila and Malus sieversii) and Pyrus communis. They mine the leaves of their host plant.
