= Phyllonorycter macrantherella =

Scientific classification
- Domain: Eukaryota
- Kingdom: Animalia
- Phylum: Arthropoda
- Class: Insecta
- Order: Lepidoptera
- Family: Gracillariidae
- Genus: Phyllonorycter
- Species: P. macrantherella

Binomial name
- Phyllonorycter macrantherella (Kuznetzov, 1961)

Species of moth

Phyllonorycter macrantherella is a moth of the family Gracillariidae. It is known from Armenia, Georgia, Daghestan, Turkey and Ukraine.

The larvae feed on Quercus macranthera. They probably mine the leaves of their host plant.
