= Phyllonorycter gracilis =

Scientific classification
- Kingdom: Animalia
- Phylum: Arthropoda
- Class: Insecta
- Order: Lepidoptera
- Family: Gracillariidae
- Genus: Phyllonorycter
- Species: P. gracilis

Binomial name
- Phyllonorycter gracilis Noreika, 1994

Species of moth

Phyllonorycter gracilis is a moth of the family Gracillariidae. It is known from the Russian Far East.
