= Phyllonorycter kuznetzovi =

Scientific classification
- Domain: Eukaryota
- Kingdom: Animalia
- Phylum: Arthropoda
- Class: Insecta
- Order: Lepidoptera
- Family: Gracillariidae
- Genus: Phyllonorycter
- Species: P. kuznetzovi

Binomial name
- Phyllonorycter kuznetzovi (Ermolaev, 1982)

Species of moth

Phyllonorycter kuznetzovi is a moth of the family Gracillariidae. It is known from the Russian Far East.

The larvae feed on Lespedeza bicolor. They probably mine the leaves of their host plant.
