= Phyllonorycter populi =

Scientific classification
- Domain: Eukaryota
- Kingdom: Animalia
- Phylum: Arthropoda
- Class: Insecta
- Order: Lepidoptera
- Family: Gracillariidae
- Genus: Phyllonorycter
- Species: P. populi

Binomial name
- Phyllonorycter populi (Filipjev, 1931)

Synonyms
- Lithocolletis populi Filipjev, 1931

Species of moth

Phyllonorycter populi is a moth of the family Gracillariidae. It was described by Ivan Nikolayevich Filipjev in 1937 and is known from southern Kazakhstan, Tajikistan, Turkmenistan and Uzbekistan.

The larvae feed on Populus alba and Populus nigra. They probably mine the leaves of their host plant.

== Taxonomy ==
Phyllonorycter populi is a replacement name for Lithocolletis populiella.(Filipjev, 1926).
