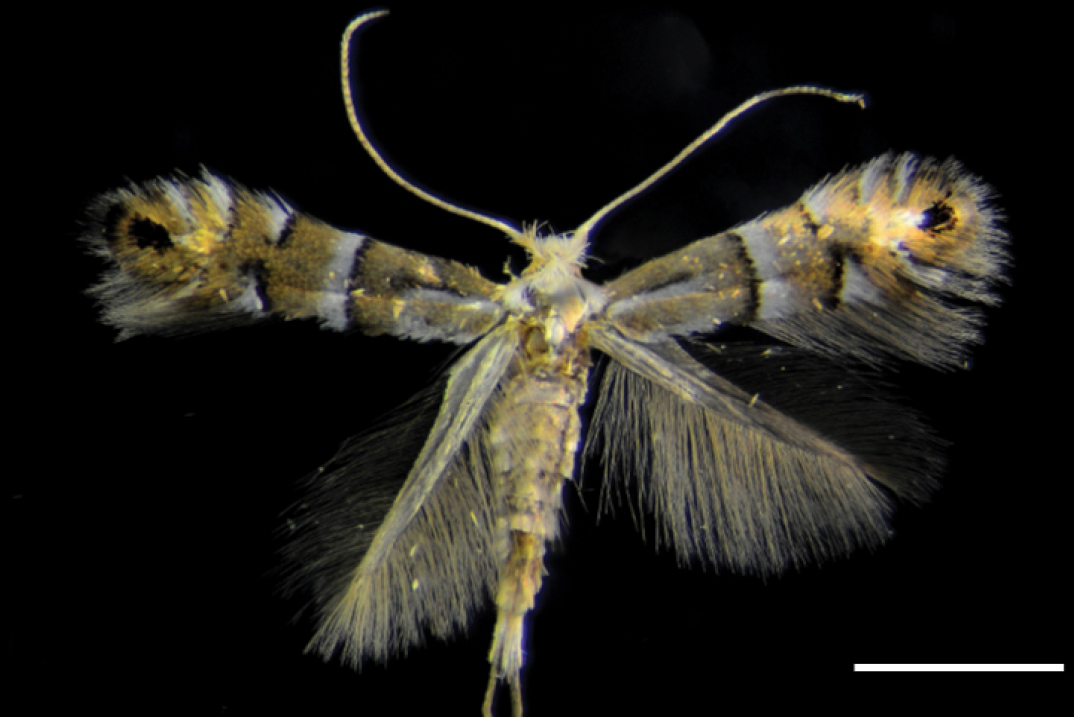
- Phyllonorycter caraganella

Scientific classification
- Kingdom: Animalia
- Phylum: Arthropoda
- Clade: Pancrustacea
- Class: Insecta
- Order: Lepidoptera
- Family: Gracillariidae
- Genus: Phyllonorycter
- Species: P. caraganella

Binomial name
- Phyllonorycter caraganella (Ermolaev, 1986)

= Phyllonorycter caraganella =

Species of moth

Phyllonorycter caraganella is a moth of the family Gracillariidae. Its origins are from the Russian Far East.

The larvae feed on Caragana fruticosa. They mine the leaves of their host plant.
