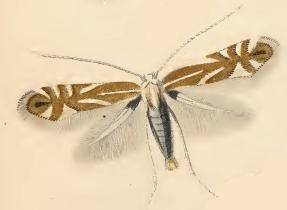

Scientific classification
- Domain: Eukaryota
- Kingdom: Animalia
- Phylum: Arthropoda
- Class: Insecta
- Order: Lepidoptera
- Family: Gracillariidae
- Genus: Phyllonorycter
- Species: P. esperella

Binomial name
- Phyllonorycter esperella (Goeze, 1783)

Synonyms
- Tinea esperella Goeze, 1783; Lithocolletis carpinicolella Stainton, 1851; Tinea quinnata Fourcroy, 1785

= Phyllonorycter esperella =

Species of moth

Phyllonorycter esperella is a moth of the family Gracillariidae. It is found from Sweden to the Pyrenees, Italy and Greece and from Great Britain to Ukraine.

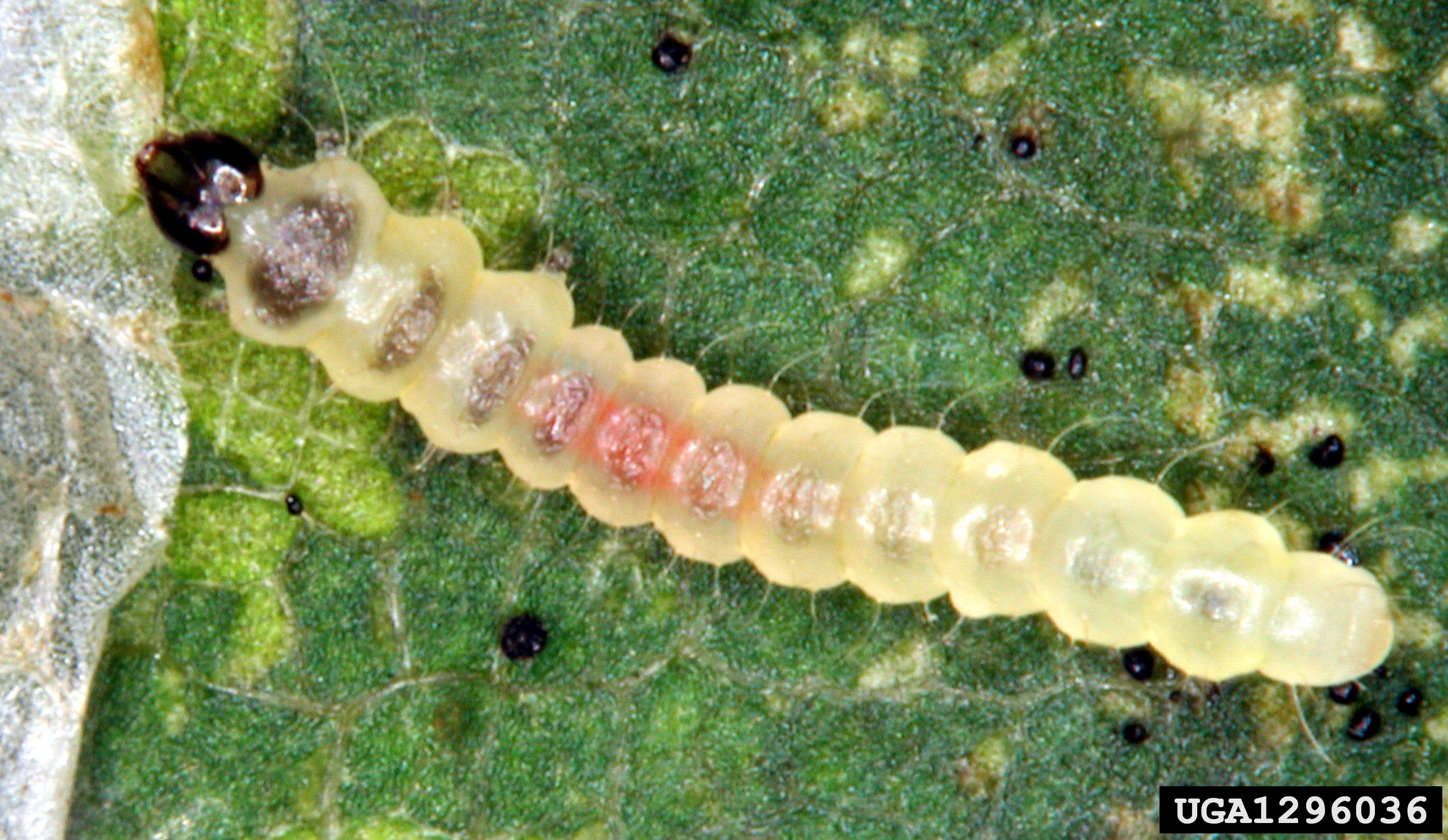
Larva

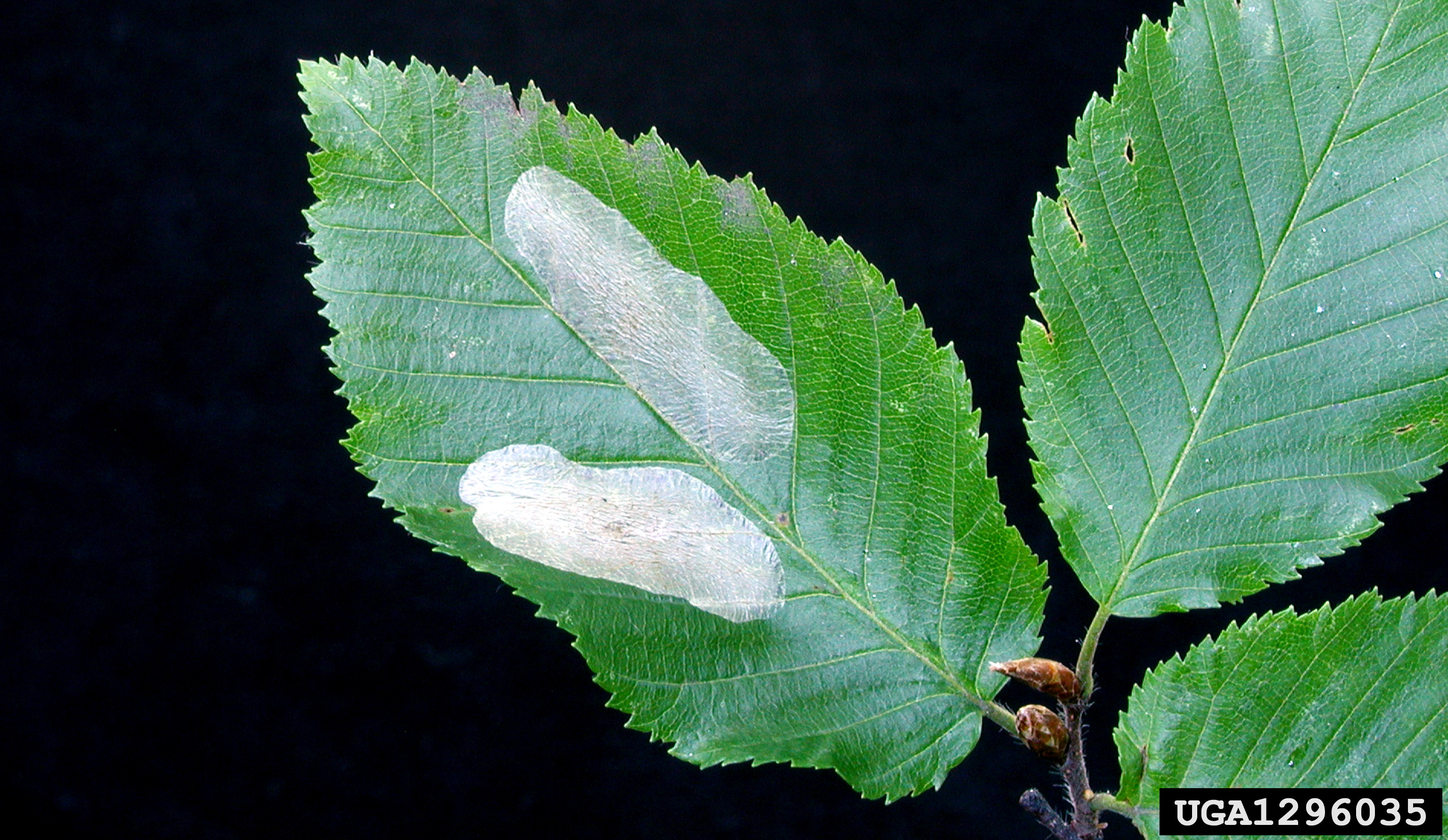
Damage

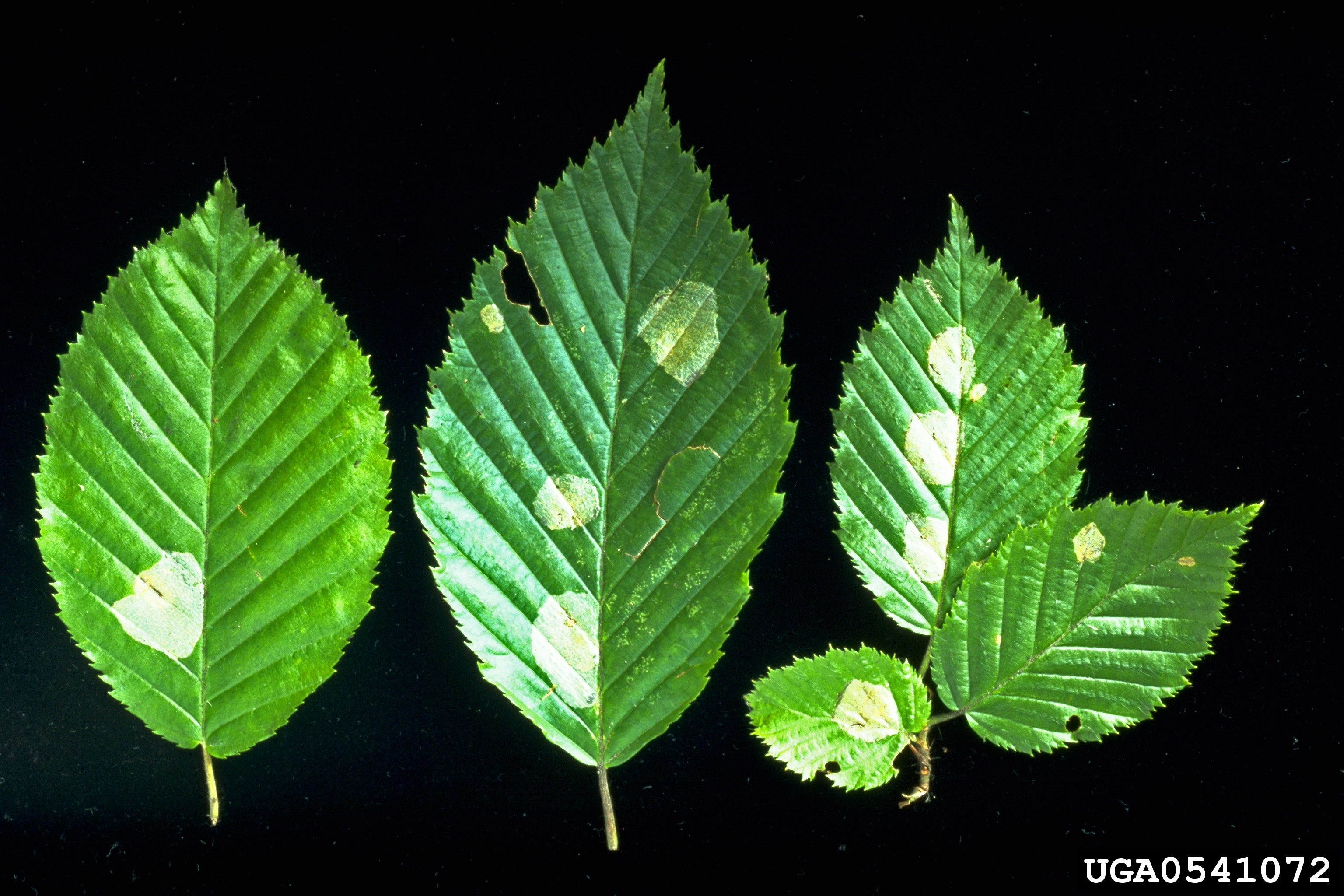
Damage

The wingspan is 7–9 mm. Adults are on wing in May and August in two generations in western Europe.

The larvae feed on Carpinus betulus and Ostrya carpinifolia. They mine the leaves of their host plant.
