= Phyllonorycter gerasimowi =

Scientific classification
- Domain: Eukaryota
- Kingdom: Animalia
- Phylum: Arthropoda
- Class: Insecta
- Order: Lepidoptera
- Family: Gracillariidae
- Genus: Phyllonorycter
- Species: P. gerasimowi

Binomial name
- Phyllonorycter gerasimowi (M. Hering, 1930)

Synonyms
- Lithocolletis gerasimowi M. Hering, 1930; Phyllonorycter gerasimovi

Species of moth

Phyllonorycter gerasimowi is a moth of the family Gracillariidae. It is known from Hungary, Thrace, southern and central Russia and Ukraine.
