= Stigmella zagulaevi =

Scientific classification
- Kingdom: Animalia
- Phylum: Arthropoda
- Class: Insecta
- Order: Lepidoptera
- Family: Nepticulidae
- Genus: Stigmella
- Species: S. zagulaevi

Binomial name
- Stigmella zagulaevi Puplesis, 1994

Species of moth

Stigmella zagulaevi is a moth of the family Nepticulidae. It is found in Russia (the northern Caucasus).
