= Stigmella fervida =

Scientific classification
- Kingdom: Animalia
- Phylum: Arthropoda
- Clade: Pancrustacea
- Class: Insecta
- Order: Lepidoptera
- Family: Nepticulidae
- Genus: Stigmella
- Species: S. fervida

Binomial name
- Stigmella fervida Puplesis, 1984

Species of moth

Stigmella fervida is a moth of the family Nepticulidae. It is found in Russia (Primorskiy Kray) and China (Heilongjiang).

The wingspan is 4.2–5.4 millimetres (0.17–0.21 in). There are two generations per year. Adults are on wing in June–July and again in spring, although this second generation is only from larvae.

The larvae feed on Quercus mongolica. They mine the leaves of their host plant.
