= Stigmella monella =

Scientific classification
- Kingdom: Animalia
- Phylum: Arthropoda
- Class: Insecta
- Order: Lepidoptera
- Family: Nepticulidae
- Genus: Stigmella
- Species: S. monella

Binomial name
- Stigmella monella Puplesis, 1984

Synonyms
- Stigmella japonica Kemperman & Wilkinson, 1985

Species of moth

Stigmella monella is a moth of the family Nepticulidae. It is found in the Russian Far East, Japan (Hokkaido) and probably north-eastern China.

There are probably at least two generations per year.
