= Stigmella mirabella =

Scientific classification
- Kingdom: Animalia
- Phylum: Arthropoda
- Class: Insecta
- Order: Lepidoptera
- Family: Nepticulidae
- Genus: Stigmella
- Species: S. mirabella

Binomial name
- Stigmella mirabella (Puplesis, 1984)

Synonyms
- Astigmella mirabella Puplesis, 1984

Species of moth

Stigmella mirabella is a moth of the family Nepticulidae. It is found in the Amur and Primorye regions of Russia.

The larvae feed on Betula dahurica. They mine the trunks of their host plant.
