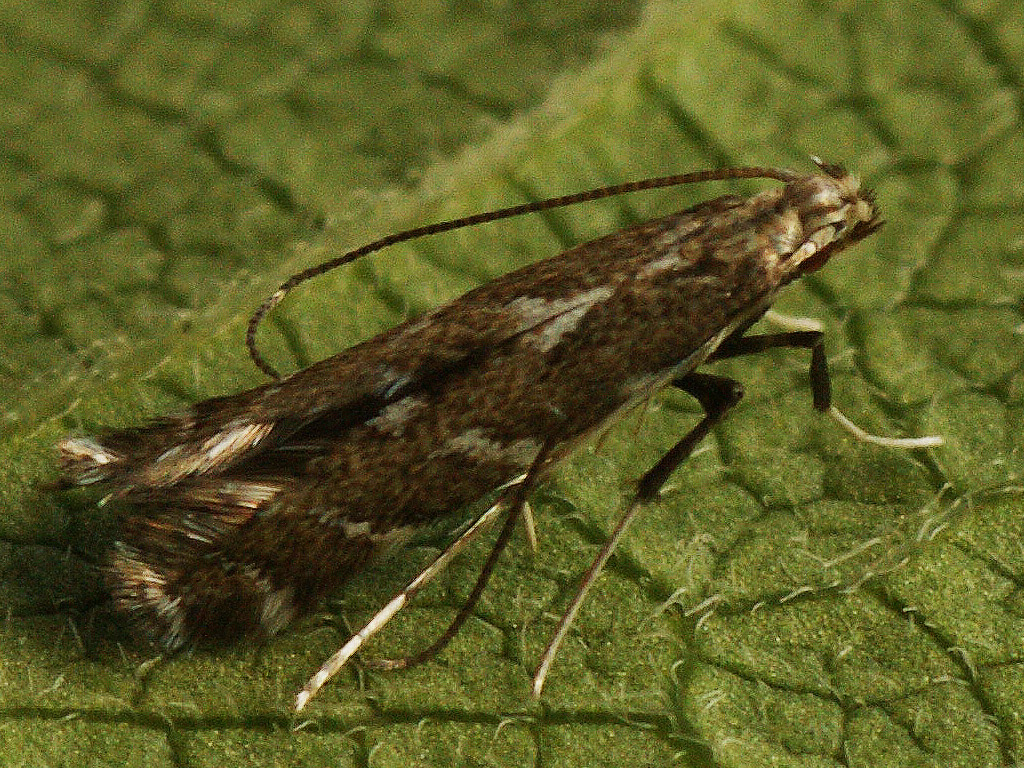

Scientific classification
- Kingdom: Animalia
- Phylum: Arthropoda
- Clade: Pancrustacea
- Class: Insecta
- Order: Lepidoptera
- Family: Gracillariidae
- Genus: Acrocercops
- Species: A. brongniardella

Binomial name
- Acrocercops brongniardella Fabricius, 1798

Synonyms
- List: Acrocercops infuscatus Caradja, 1920; Elachista curtisella Duponchel, [1840]; Acrocercops disconigrellum Klemensiewicz, 1899; Coriscium qercetellum Zeller, 1839; Elachista quercetella Duponchel, [1843]; Coriscium quercetellum Zeller, 1847; Gracillaria substriga Haworth, 1828

= Leaf blotch miner moth =

Species of moth

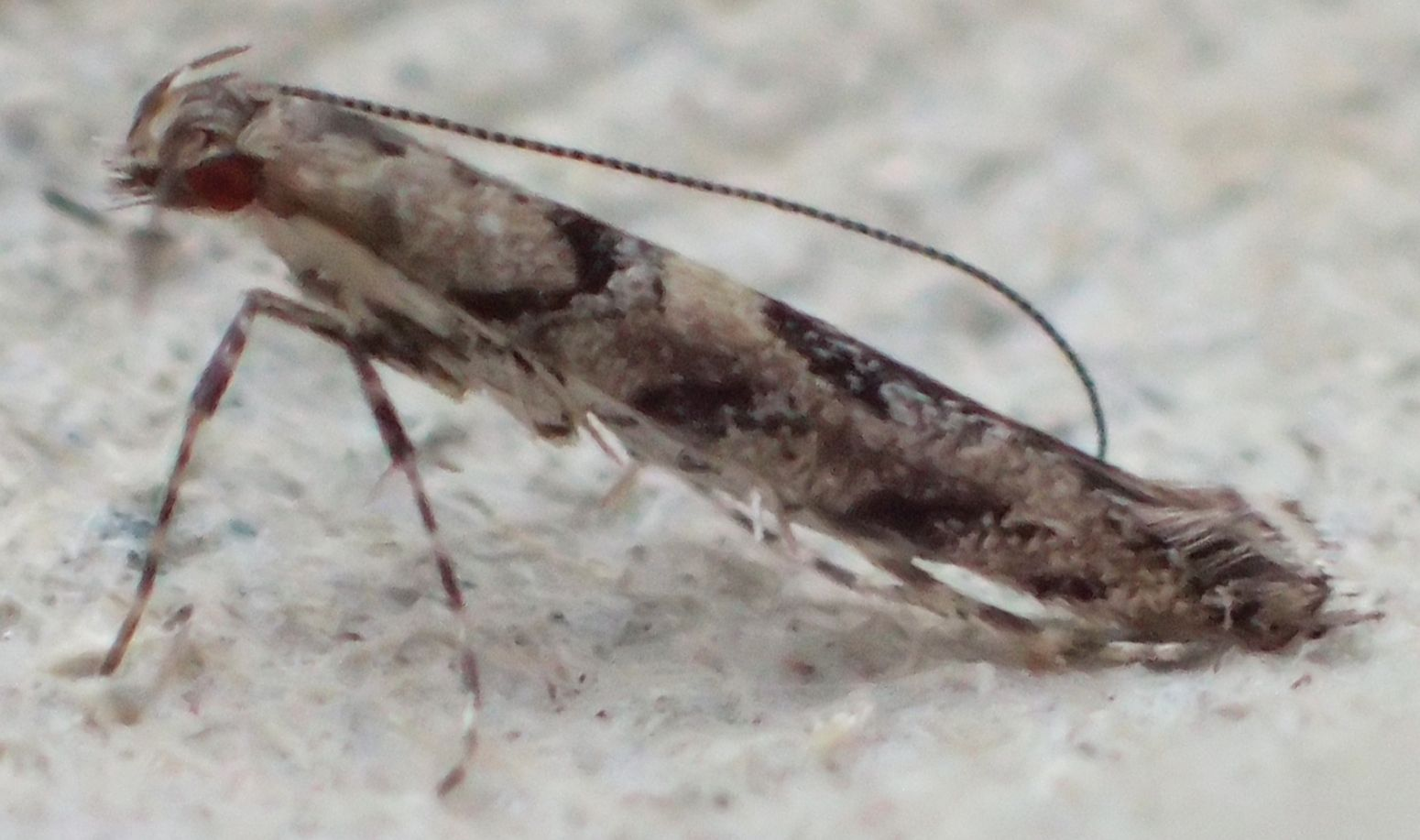
Typical resting position

The leaf blotch miner moth (Acrocercops brongniardella) is a moth of the family Gracillariidae. It is found in Europe, including Turkey.

The wingspan is 8–10 mm. The moth has light to dark brown forewings with a pure white pattern of oblique bars edged with black. The cilia are grey. The head is brownish. The antennae are longer than forewing length. The hindwings are brownish-grey. Meyrick describes it " O. brongniardellum, F. 8-10 mm. Posterior tibiae bristly above. Forewings fuscous, sprinkled with yellow-whitish; four slender oblique white fasciae, edged with black, more strongly anteriorly, last three interrupted near dorsum; a black projecting hook in apical cilia. Hindwings dark grey. Larva pale whitish-green; dorsal line darker; head pale brown: in blotches in leaves of oak; 6,7. "

The adults sit with their front legs stretched out to hold the head and thorax slanted up. The moths can be found in any month, probably in one extended brood.

== Larva ==
The larvae feed on Quercus species including holm oak (Quercus ilex), feeding gregariously in the upper epidermis making conspicuous white blotches.
