= Stigmella tegmentosella =

Scientific classification
- Kingdom: Animalia
- Phylum: Arthropoda
- Class: Insecta
- Order: Lepidoptera
- Family: Nepticulidae
- Genus: Stigmella
- Species: S. tegmentosella

Binomial name
- Stigmella tegmentosella Puplesis, 1984

Species of moth

Stigmella tegmentosella is a moth of the family Nepticulidae. It is known from the Russian Far East.

The larvae feed on Acer tegmentosum. They probably mine the leaves of their host plant.
