= Stigmella attenuata =

Scientific classification
- Kingdom: Animalia
- Phylum: Arthropoda
- Class: Insecta
- Order: Lepidoptera
- Family: Nepticulidae
- Genus: Stigmella
- Species: S. attenuata

Binomial name
- Stigmella attenuata Puplesis, 1985

Species of moth

Stigmella attenuata is a moth of the family Nepticulidae. It was described by Puplesis in 1985. It is known from the Russian Far East.
