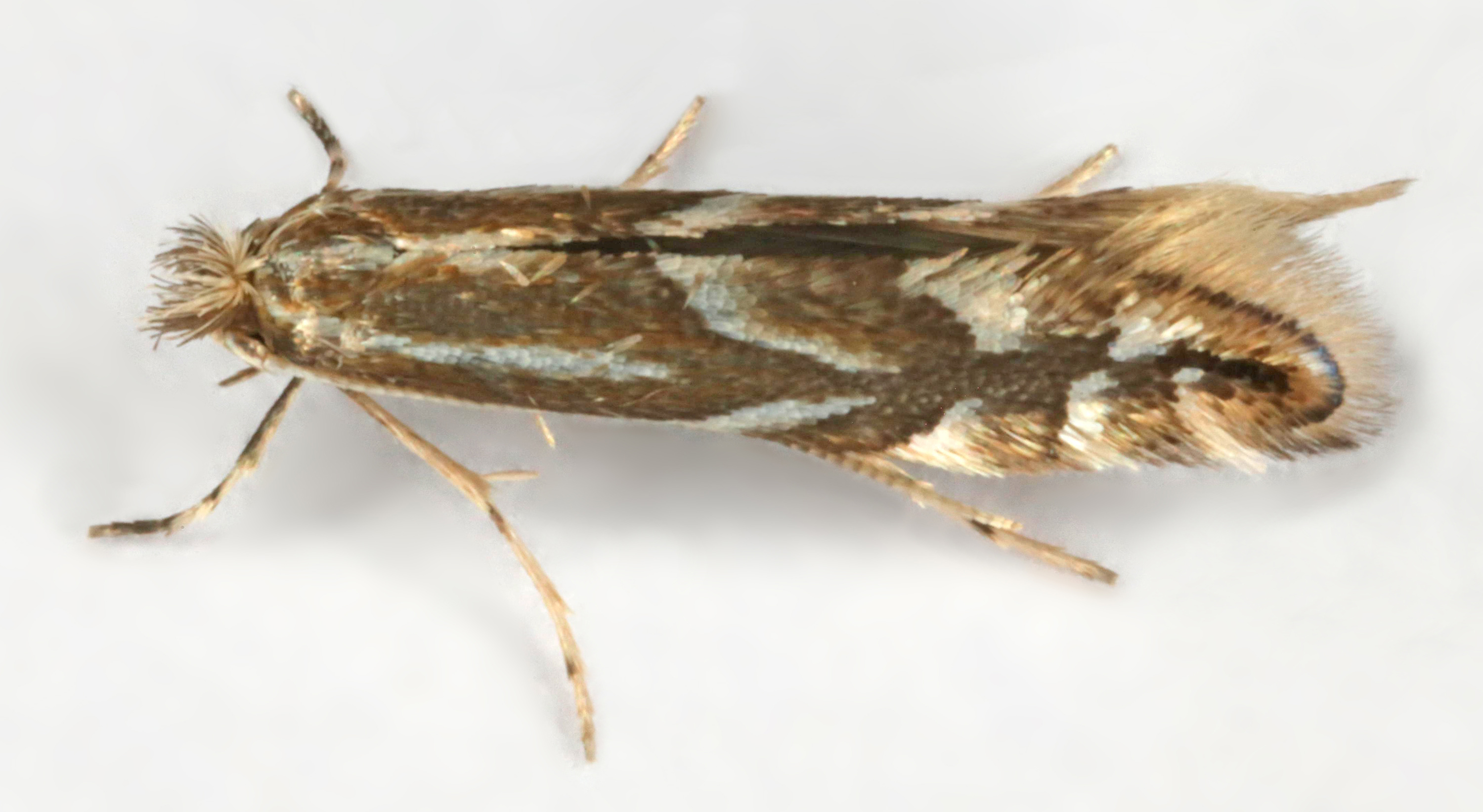

Scientific classification
- Kingdom: Animalia
- Phylum: Arthropoda
- Clade: Pancrustacea
- Class: Insecta
- Order: Lepidoptera
- Family: Gracillariidae
- Genus: Phyllonorycter
- Species: P. coryli

Binomial name
- Phyllonorycter coryli (Nicelli, 1851)

Synonyms
- Lithocolletis coryli Nicelli, 1851

= Phyllonorycter coryli =

Species of moth

Phyllonorycter coryli, or nut leaf blister moth, is a moth of the family Gracillariidae. It is found most of Europe, except the Balkan Peninsula.

The wingspan is 7–9 mm. The forewings are golden-ochreous, often fuscous-tinged, first costal spot dark-margined posteriorly. The larva is pale yellowish; dorsal line dark green; head pale brown.

The larvae feed on Corylus avellana, Corylus colurna, Corylus maxima and Ostrya carpinifolia. They mine the leaves of their host plant.

== Gallery ==
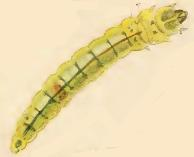
Larva

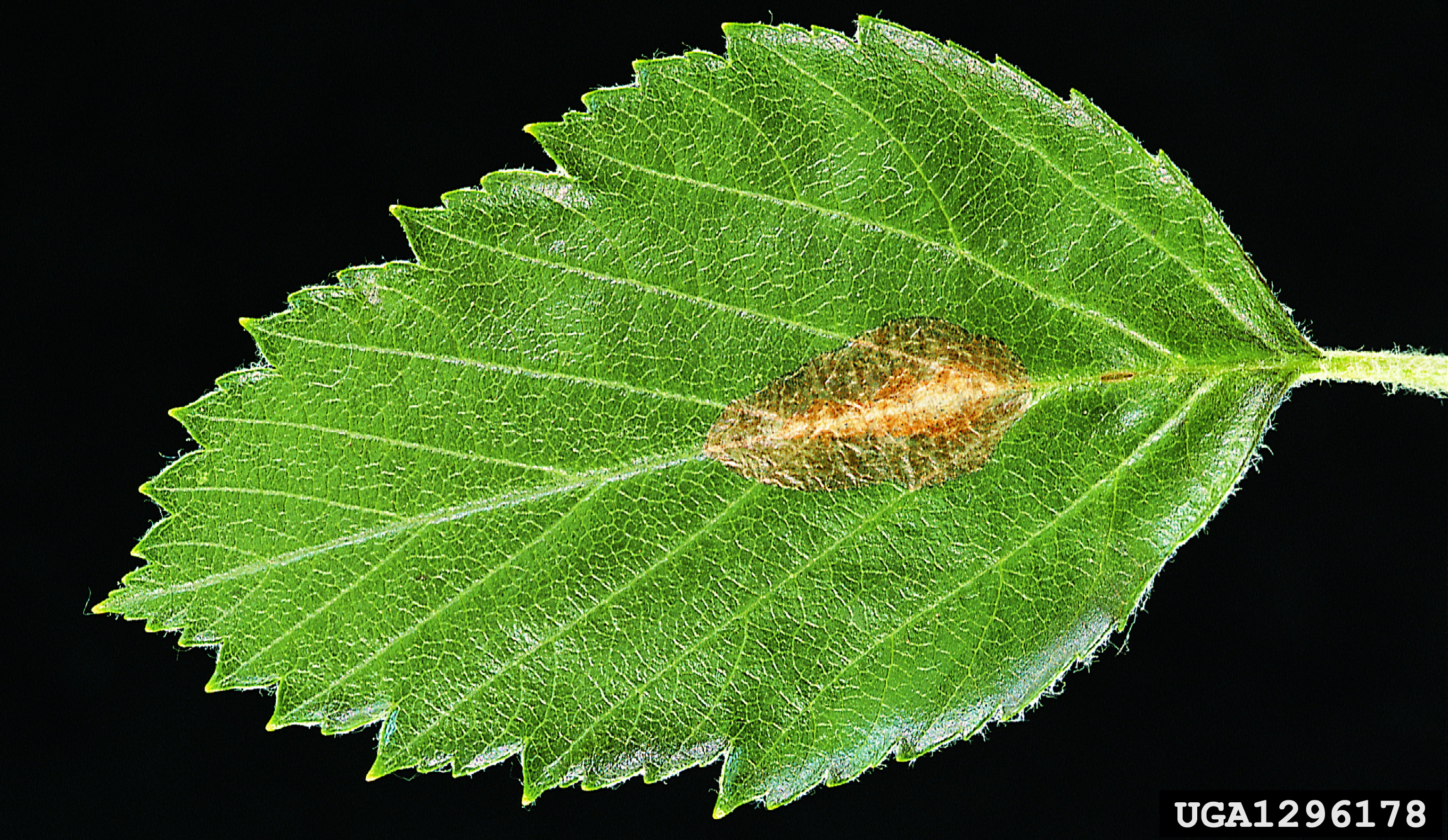
Mine

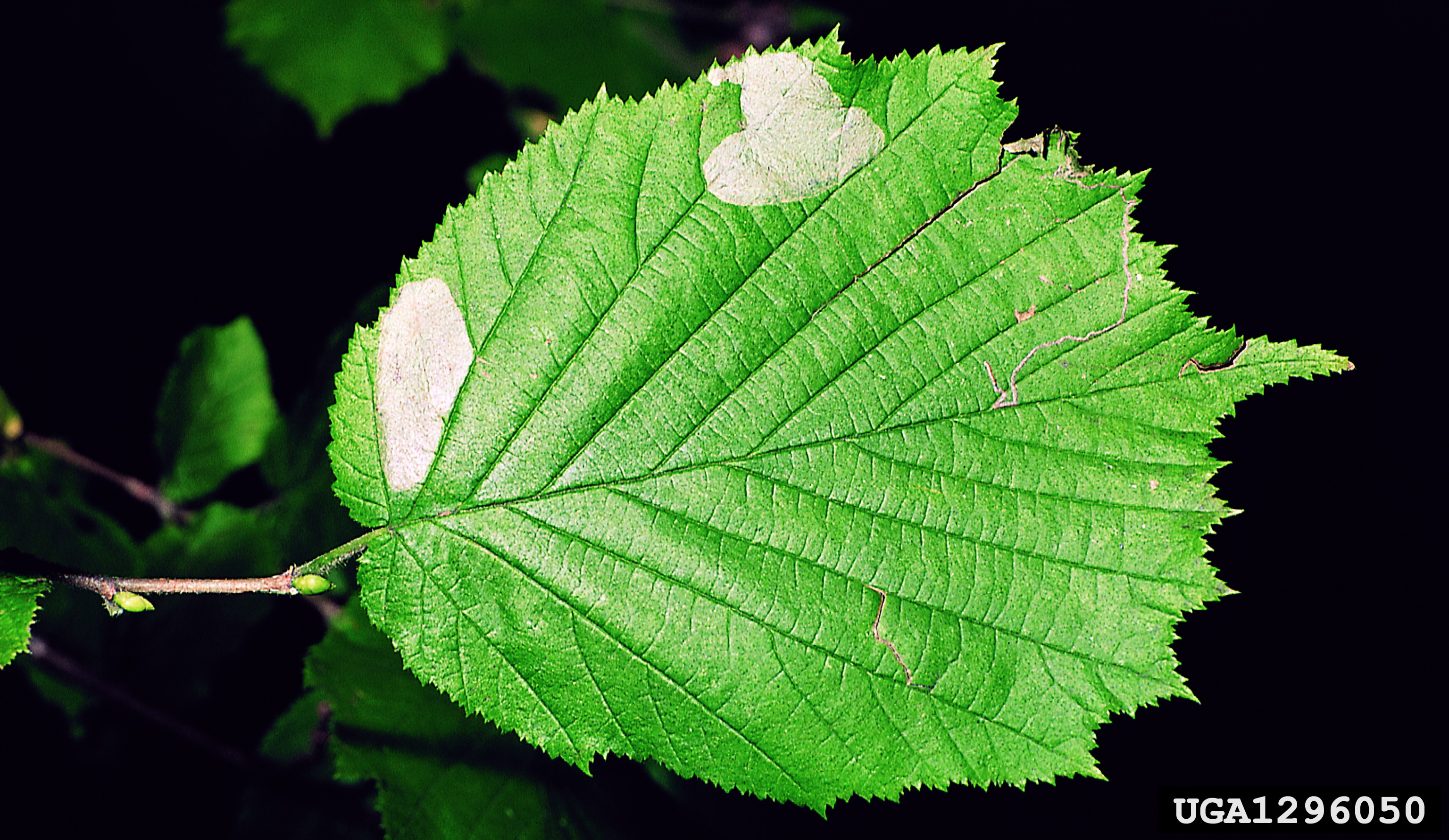
Leaf mine

Close-up of leaf mine
