= Stigmella nostrata =

Scientific classification
- Kingdom: Animalia
- Phylum: Arthropoda
- Class: Insecta
- Order: Lepidoptera
- Family: Nepticulidae
- Genus: Stigmella
- Species: S. nostrata

Binomial name
- Stigmella nostrata Puplesis, 1984

Species of moth

Stigmella nostrata is a moth of the family Nepticulidae. It is found in the Amur and Primorye regions of Russia.

The larvae feed on Pyrus ussuriensis. They probably mine the leaves of their host.
