= Stigmella crataegivora =

Scientific classification
- Kingdom: Animalia
- Phylum: Arthropoda
- Class: Insecta
- Order: Lepidoptera
- Family: Nepticulidae
- Genus: Stigmella
- Species: S. crataegivora

Binomial name
- Stigmella crataegivora Puplesis, 1985

Species of moth

Stigmella crataegivora is a moth of the family Nepticulidae. It was described by Puplesis in 1985. It is known from the Russian Far East.

The larvae feed on Crataegus maximowiczi. They probably mine the leaves of their host plant.
