= Phyllonorycter laurocerasi =

Scientific classification
- Domain: Eukaryota
- Kingdom: Animalia
- Phylum: Arthropoda
- Class: Insecta
- Order: Lepidoptera
- Family: Gracillariidae
- Genus: Phyllonorycter
- Species: P. laurocerasi

Binomial name
- Phyllonorycter laurocerasi (Kuznetzov, 1979)

Species of moth

Phyllonorycter laurocerasi is a moth of the family Gracillariidae. It is known from Georgia and Russia.

The larvae feed on Prunus laurocerasus. They mine the leaves of their host plant. They create a lower-surface tentiform mine.
