= Glyphipterix magnatella =

Scientific classification
- Kingdom: Animalia
- Phylum: Arthropoda
- Clade: Pancrustacea
- Class: Insecta
- Order: Lepidoptera
- Family: Glyphipterigidae
- Genus: Glyphipterix
- Species: G. magnatella

Binomial name
- Glyphipterix magnatella Erschoff, 1877

Species of moth

Glyphipterix magnatella is a species of sedge moth in the genus Glyphipterix. It was described by Nikolay Grigoryevich Erschoff in 1877. It is found in Siberia, Russia.
