= Phyllonorycter reduncata =

Scientific classification
- Domain: Eukaryota
- Kingdom: Animalia
- Phylum: Arthropoda
- Class: Insecta
- Order: Lepidoptera
- Family: Gracillariidae
- Genus: Phyllonorycter
- Species: P. reduncata

Binomial name
- Phyllonorycter reduncata (Ermolaev, 1986)

Species of moth

Phyllonorycter reduncata is a moth of the family Gracillariidae. It is known from the Russian Far East.
