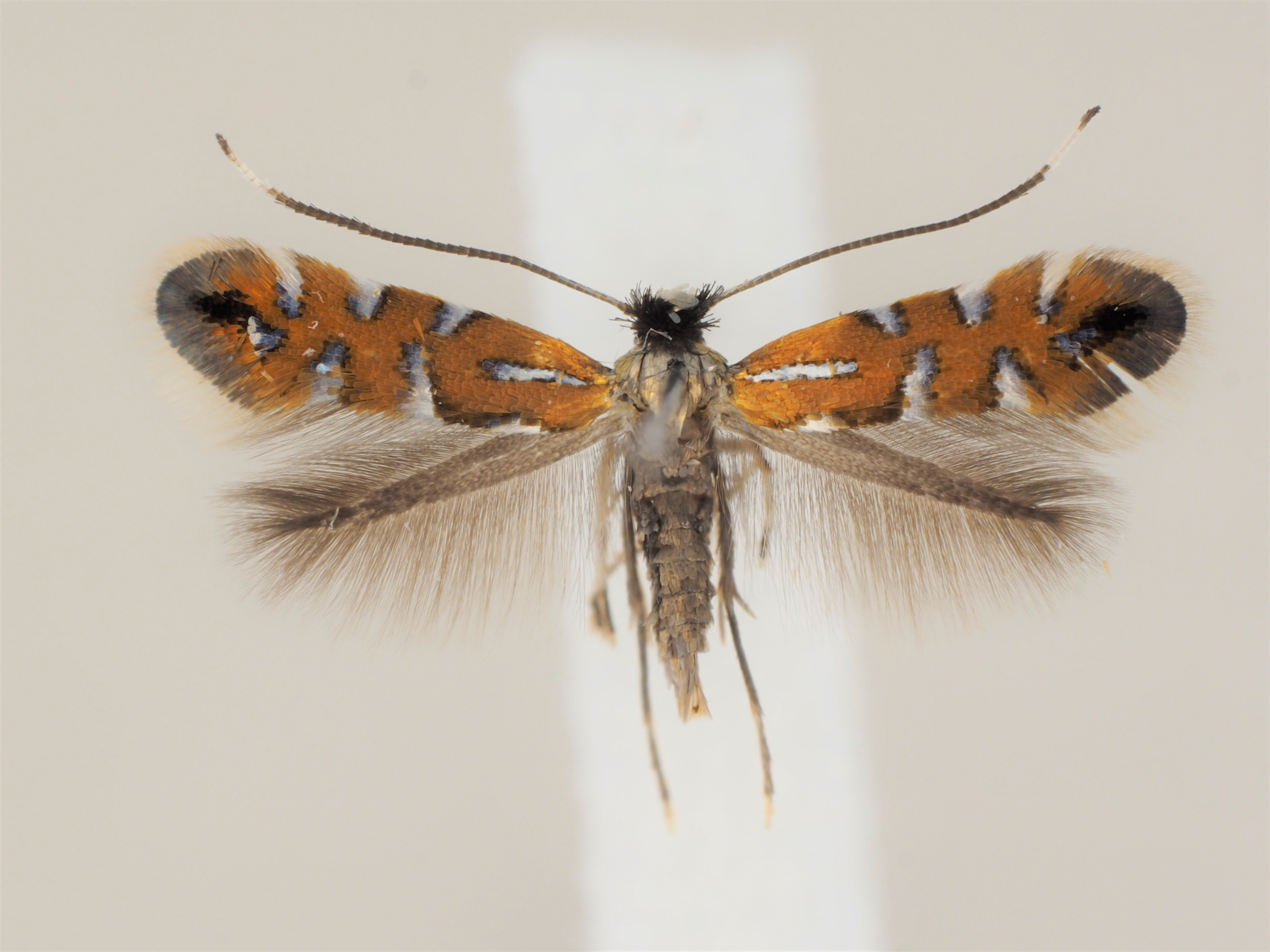

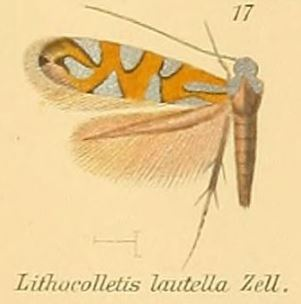

Scientific classification
- Kingdom: Animalia
- Phylum: Arthropoda
- Clade: Pancrustacea
- Class: Insecta
- Order: Lepidoptera
- Family: Gracillariidae
- Genus: Phyllonorycter
- Species: P. lautella

Binomial name
- Phyllonorycter lautella (Zeller, 1846)

Synonyms
- Lithocolletis lautella Zeller, 1846; Lithocolletis irmella N. Palm, 1947

= Phyllonorycter lautella =

Species of moth

Phyllonorycter lautella is a moth of the family Gracillariidae. It is known from all of Europe, except the Mediterranean islands.

The wingspan is 6–7 mm. The head is black, face leaden -metallic. Antennae with apex white. Forewings ochreous-orange or golden -brown; a silvery-white black-edged median streak from base to 2/3 and central sometimes interrupted fascia; two costal and two dorsal posterior triangular silvery white spots, edged with black anteriorly and dorsal posteriorly.

There are two generations per year with adults on wing in May and again in August.

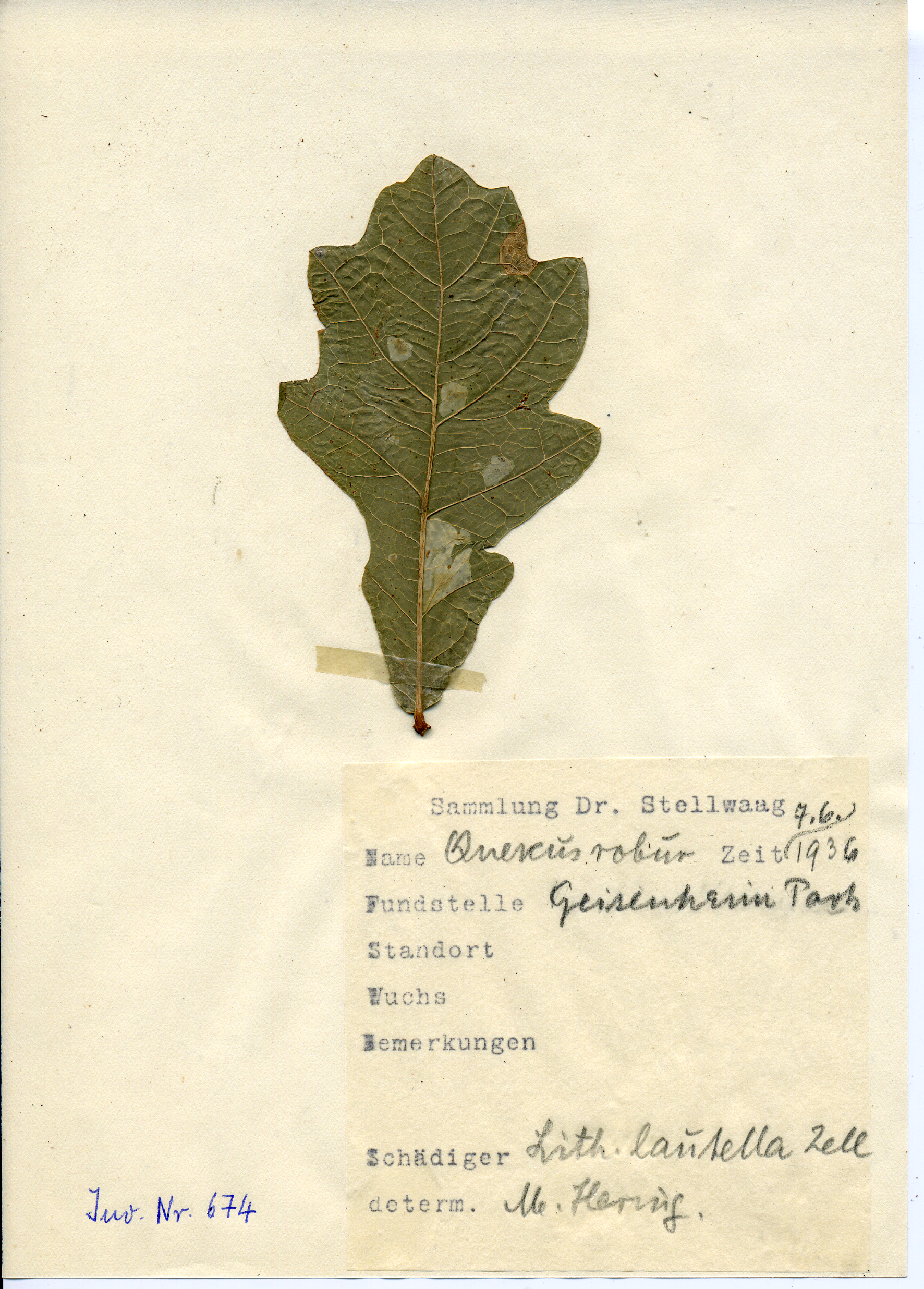
Mined oakleaf

The larvae feed on Quercus dalechamii, Quercus petraea and Quercus robur. They mine the leaves of their host plant.
