= Phyllonorycter fruticosella =

Scientific classification
- Domain: Eukaryota
- Kingdom: Animalia
- Phylum: Arthropoda
- Class: Insecta
- Order: Lepidoptera
- Family: Gracillariidae
- Genus: Phyllonorycter
- Species: P. fruticosella

Binomial name
- Phyllonorycter fruticosella (Kuznetzov, 1979)

Species of moth

Phyllonorycter fruticosella is a moth of the family Gracillariidae. It is known from the Russian Far East and the central Asian part of Russia.

The larvae feed on Alnus viridis fruticosa. They probably mine the leaves of their host plant.
