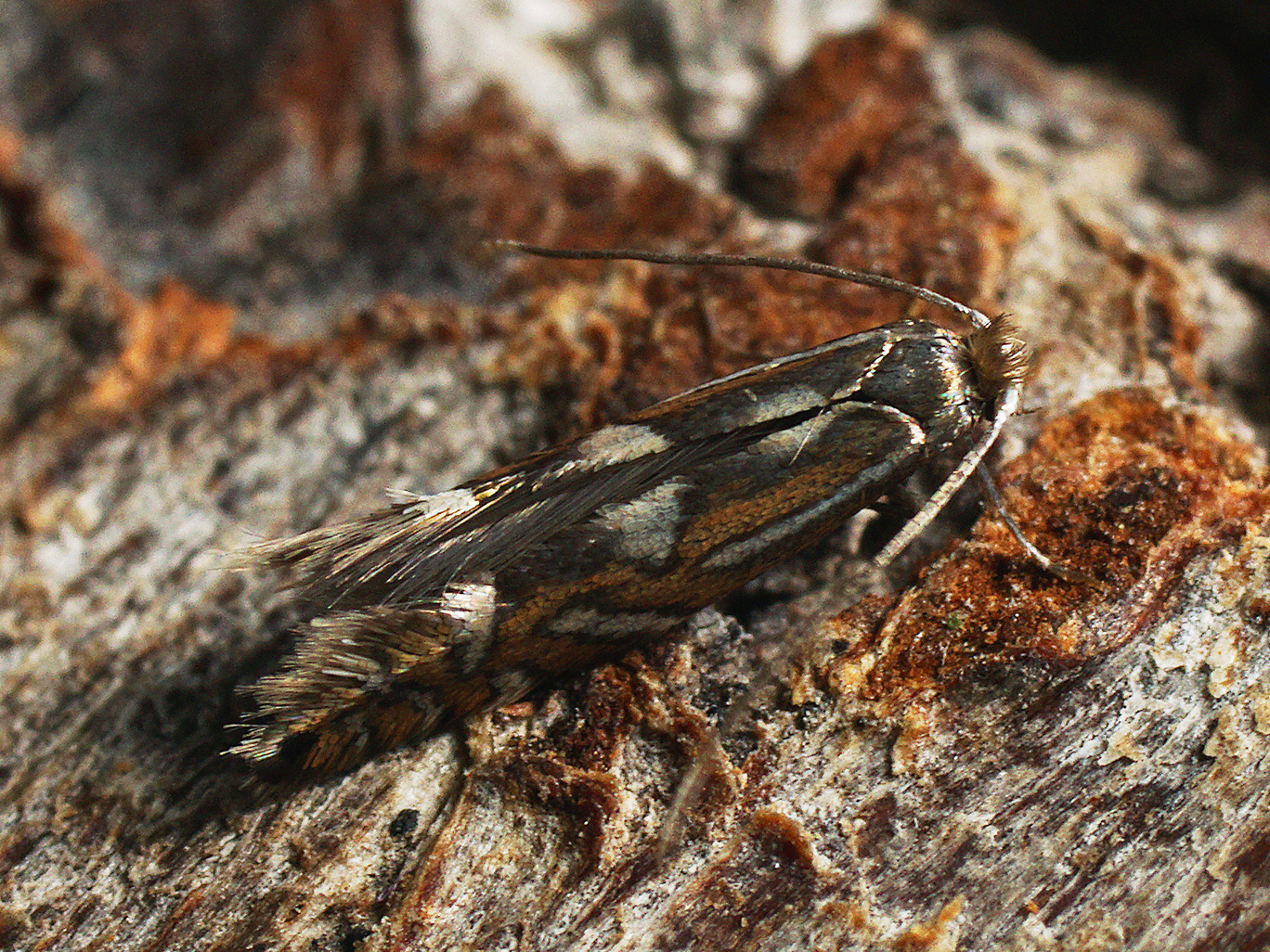

Scientific classification
- Domain: Eukaryota
- Kingdom: Animalia
- Phylum: Arthropoda
- Class: Insecta
- Order: Lepidoptera
- Family: Gracillariidae
- Genus: Phyllonorycter
- Species: P. strigulatella

Binomial name
- Phyllonorycter strigulatella (Lienig & Zeller, 1846)

Synonyms
- Lithocolletis strigulatella Lienig & Zeller, 1846

= Phyllonorycter strigulatella =

Species of moth

Phyllonorycter strigulatella is a moth of the family Gracillariidae. It is found in the most of Europe (except Ireland, the Iberian Peninsula and Greece), east to Russia and Japan.

The wingspan is 7–9 mm. There are two generations per year with adults on wing in May and again in late July and August.

The larvae feed on Alnus incana and Alnus minor. They mine the leaves of their host plant.
