= Phyllonorycter valentina =

Scientific classification
- Kingdom: Animalia
- Phylum: Arthropoda
- Clade: Pancrustacea
- Class: Insecta
- Order: Lepidoptera
- Family: Gracillariidae
- Genus: Phyllonorycter
- Species: P. valentina

Binomial name
- Phyllonorycter valentina (Ermolaev, 1981)

Species of moth

Phyllonorycter valentina is a moth of the family Gracillariidae. It is known from the Russian Far East.

The larvae feed on Ulmus species, including Ulmus propinqua and Ulmus macrocarpa. They mine the leaves of their host plant.
