= Stigmella alisa =

Scientific classification
- Kingdom: Animalia
- Phylum: Arthropoda
- Class: Insecta
- Order: Lepidoptera
- Family: Nepticulidae
- Genus: Stigmella
- Species: S. alisa

Binomial name
- Stigmella alisa Puplesis, 1985

Species of moth

Stigmella alisa is a moth of the family Nepticulidae. It is known from the Russian Far East.
