= Phyllonorycter pumilae =

Scientific classification
- Domain: Eukaryota
- Kingdom: Animalia
- Phylum: Arthropoda
- Class: Insecta
- Order: Lepidoptera
- Family: Gracillariidae
- Genus: Phyllonorycter
- Species: P. pumilae

Binomial name
- Phyllonorycter pumilae (Ermolaev, 1981)

Species of moth

Phyllonorycter pumilae is a moth of the family Gracillariidae. It is known from the Russian Far East, Japan and north-western China.

The larvae feed on Ulmus pumila. They probably mine the leaves of their host plant.
