= Stigmella palionisi =

Scientific classification
- Kingdom: Animalia
- Phylum: Arthropoda
- Class: Insecta
- Order: Lepidoptera
- Family: Nepticulidae
- Genus: Stigmella
- Species: S. palionisi

Binomial name
- Stigmella palionisi Puplesis, 1984

Species of moth

Stigmella palionisi is a moth of the family Nepticulidae. It is known from the Russian Far East.

The larvae probably feed on Ulmus species.
