= Phyllonorycter populialbae =

Scientific classification
- Domain: Eukaryota
- Kingdom: Animalia
- Phylum: Arthropoda
- Class: Insecta
- Order: Lepidoptera
- Family: Gracillariidae
- Genus: Phyllonorycter
- Species: P. populialbae

Binomial name
- Phyllonorycter populialbae (Kuznetzov, 1961)

Synonyms
- Lithocolletis populialbae Kuznetzov, 1961

Species of moth

Phyllonorycter populialbae is a moth of the family Gracillariidae. It is known from the Caucasus.

The larvae feed on Populus alba. They probably mine the leaves of their host plant.
