= Glyphipterix simplicella =

Scientific classification
- Kingdom: Animalia
- Phylum: Arthropoda
- Clade: Pancrustacea
- Class: Insecta
- Order: Lepidoptera
- Family: Glyphipterigidae
- Genus: Glyphipterix
- Species: G. simplicella

Binomial name
- Glyphipterix simplicella Christoph, 1882

Species of moth

Glyphipterix simplicella is a species of sedge moth in the genus Glyphipterix. It was described by Hugo Theodor Christoph in 1882. It is found in eastern Siberia.
