= Phyllonorycter malicola =

Scientific classification
- Domain: Eukaryota
- Kingdom: Animalia
- Phylum: Arthropoda
- Class: Insecta
- Order: Lepidoptera
- Family: Gracillariidae
- Genus: Phyllonorycter
- Species: P. malicola

Binomial name
- Phyllonorycter malicola (Kuznetzov, 1979)

Species of moth

Phyllonorycter malicola is a moth of the family Gracillariidae. It is known from the Russian Far East.

The larvae feed on Malus mandshurica. They probably mine the leaves of their host plant.
