= Phyllonorycter pseudojezoniella =

Scientific classification
- Domain: Eukaryota
- Kingdom: Animalia
- Phylum: Arthropoda
- Class: Insecta
- Order: Lepidoptera
- Family: Gracillariidae
- Genus: Phyllonorycter
- Species: P. pseudojezoniella

Binomial name
- Phyllonorycter pseudojezoniella Noreika, 1994

Species of moth

Phyllonorycter pseudojezoniella is a moth of the family Gracillariidae. It is known from the Russian Far East.

The larvae feed on Quercus mongolica and Quercus serrata. They probably mine the leaves of their host plant.
