= Phyllonorycter pyrifoliella =

Scientific classification
- Domain: Eukaryota
- Kingdom: Animalia
- Phylum: Arthropoda
- Class: Insecta
- Order: Lepidoptera
- Family: Gracillariidae
- Genus: Phyllonorycter
- Species: P. pyrifoliella

Binomial name
- Phyllonorycter pyrifoliella (Gerasimov, 1933)

Synonyms
- Lithocolletis pyrifoliella Gerasimov, 1933; Lithocolletis pomiella Gerasimov, 1933

Species of moth

Phyllonorycter pyrifoliella is a moth of the family Gracillariidae. It is found in Austria, Bulgaria, Finland, Hungary, Latvia, Moldova, Poland, Spain and Ukraine.

The larvae feed on Malus species. They mine the leaves of their host plant.
