= Stigmella taigae =

Scientific classification
- Kingdom: Animalia
- Phylum: Arthropoda
- Class: Insecta
- Order: Lepidoptera
- Family: Nepticulidae
- Genus: Stigmella
- Species: S. taigae

Binomial name
- Stigmella taigae Puplesis, 1984

Species of moth

Stigmella taigae is a moth of the family Nepticulidae. It was described by Puplesis in 1984. It is known from the Russian Far East.

The larvae feed on Rhamnus species. They probably mine the leaves of their host plant.
