= Acrocercops amurensis =

Scientific classification
- Domain: Eukaryota
- Kingdom: Animalia
- Phylum: Arthropoda
- Class: Insecta
- Order: Lepidoptera
- Family: Gracillariidae
- Genus: Acrocercops
- Species: A. amurensis

Binomial name
- Acrocercops amurensis Kuznetzov, 1960

Species of moth

Acrocercops amurensis is a moth of the family Gracillariidae, known from Russia and China. The hostplant for the species is Quercus mongolica.
