= Stigmella kazakhstanica =

Scientific classification
- Kingdom: Animalia
- Phylum: Arthropoda
- Class: Insecta
- Order: Lepidoptera
- Family: Nepticulidae
- Genus: Stigmella
- Species: S. kazakhstanica

Binomial name
- Stigmella kazakhstanica Puplesis, 1991

Species of moth

Stigmella kazakhstanica is a moth of the family Nepticulidae. It is found in Astrakhan, Kazakhstan and Turkmenistan.

The larvae feed on Ulmus species, including Ulmus carpinifolia. They mine the leaves of their host plant. The mine has the form of a contorted gallery. In the beginning, completely filled with brownish frass. The mine gradually widens. Larvae can be found in June and August.
