= Piotra =

Piotra or Pyotra may refer to:

- Pyotra Krecheuski (1879–1928), Belarusian statesman
- Piotra Sych (1912–1963), Belarusian writer and journalist

== See also ==
- Piatro Sadoŭski (1941–2026), Belarusian linguist, politician and diplomat
- Piotra Skargi Street in Bydgoszcz
- Bohemannia piotra, moth of the family Nepticulidae
