= Bohemannia nipponicella =

Scientific classification
- Domain: Eukaryota
- Kingdom: Animalia
- Phylum: Arthropoda
- Class: Insecta
- Order: Lepidoptera
- Family: Nepticulidae
- Genus: Bohemannia
- Species: B. nipponicella

Binomial name
- Bohemannia nipponicella Hirano, 2010

Species of moth

Bohemannia nipponicella is a moth of the family Nepticulidae. It was described by Hirano in 2010. It is known from Japan (Honshū).
