= Bohemannia piotra =

Scientific classification
- Domain: Eukaryota
- Kingdom: Animalia
- Phylum: Arthropoda
- Class: Insecta
- Order: Lepidoptera
- Family: Nepticulidae
- Genus: Bohemannia
- Species: B. piotra

Binomial name
- Bohemannia piotra Puplesis, 1984

Species of moth

Bohemannia piotra is a moth of the family Nepticulidae. It is found in the Russian Far East (Primorskiy Kray).

The larvae feed on Malus mandshurica. They probably mine the leaves of their host plant.

== Taxonomy ==
It was previously treated as a synonym of Bohemannia pulverosella.
