= Bohemannia ussuriella =

Scientific classification
- Domain: Eukaryota
- Kingdom: Animalia
- Phylum: Arthropoda
- Class: Insecta
- Order: Lepidoptera
- Family: Nepticulidae
- Genus: Bohemannia
- Species: B. ussuriella

Binomial name
- Bohemannia ussuriella Puplesis, 1984

Species of moth

Bohemannia ussuriella is a moth of the family Nepticulidae. It was described by R.K. Puplesis in 1984. It is known from the Russian Far East and Japan.
