= Bohemannia auriciliella =

Scientific classification
- Domain: Eukaryota
- Kingdom: Animalia
- Phylum: Arthropoda
- Class: Insecta
- Order: Lepidoptera
- Family: Nepticulidae
- Genus: Bohemannia
- Species: B. auriciliella

Binomial name
- Bohemannia auriciliella (de Joannis, 1908)

Synonyms
- Nepticula auriciliella de Joannis, 1908; Ectoedemia bradfordi Emmet, 1974

Species of moth

Bohemannia auriciliella is a moth of the family Nepticulidae. It has been recorded from Great Britain, the Netherlands, France and the Czech Republic.

The wingspan is 6-6.8 mm.

The larvae probably feed on birch (Betula species) and lime (Tilia species).
