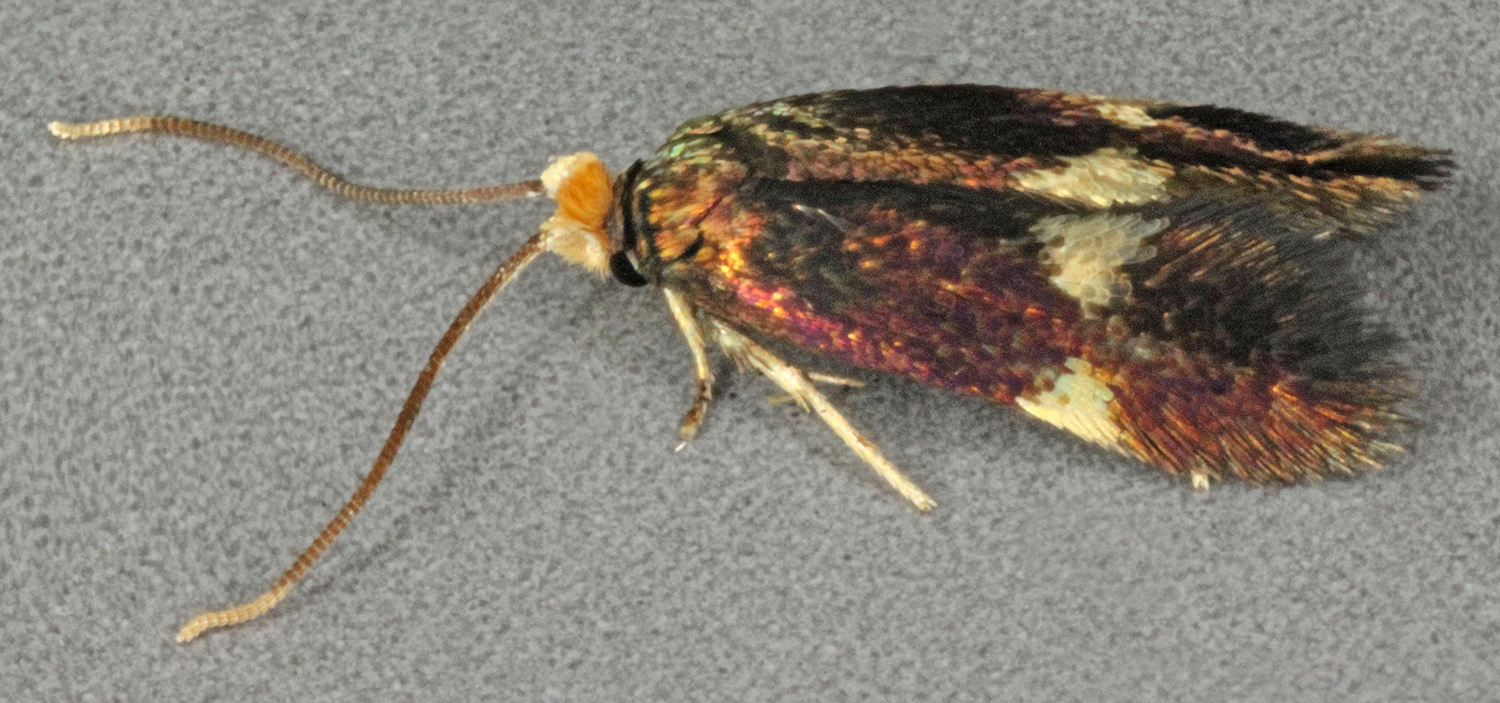
- Bohemannia quadrimaculella

Scientific classification
- Kingdom: Animalia
- Phylum: Arthropoda
- Class: Insecta
- Order: Lepidoptera
- Family: Nepticulidae
- Genus: Bohemannia
- Species: B. quadrimaculella

Binomial name
- Bohemannia quadrimaculella (Boheman, 1851)

Synonyms
- Nepticula quadrimaculella Boheman, 1853; Bucculatrix antispilella Meess, 1910

= Bohemannia quadrimaculella =

Species of moth

Bohemannia quadrimaculella is a moth of the family Nepticulidae. It is found from Norway and Sweden, south to France and from Ireland, east to the Czech Republic and Austria. It has also been recorded from Romania.

The wingspan is 7,4-8,8 mm. 7–9 mm. The head is orange and the collar isochreous-whitish.The antennal eyecaps are ochreous-whitish. The forewings are bright shining purplish-copper with yellow-whitish costal and dorsal opposite spots beyond middle. The hindwings are dark fuscous.

Adults are on wing from July to August in one generation.

The larvae possibly feed on alder (Alnus glutinosa) mining the buds or twig bark.
