= Bohemannia nubila =

Scientific classification
- Domain: Eukaryota
- Kingdom: Animalia
- Phylum: Arthropoda
- Class: Insecta
- Order: Lepidoptera
- Family: Nepticulidae
- Genus: Bohemannia
- Species: B. nubila

Binomial name
- Bohemannia nubila Puplesis, 1985

Species of moth

Bohemannia nubila is a moth of the family Nepticulidae. It was described by Puplesis in 1985. It is known from the Russian Far East, Korea and Japan.
