= Piotra Skargi Street, Bydgoszcz =

Street in Bydgoszcz, Poland

Coordinates: 53°07′34″N 18°00′28″E

Piotra Skargi Street
Bydgoszcz
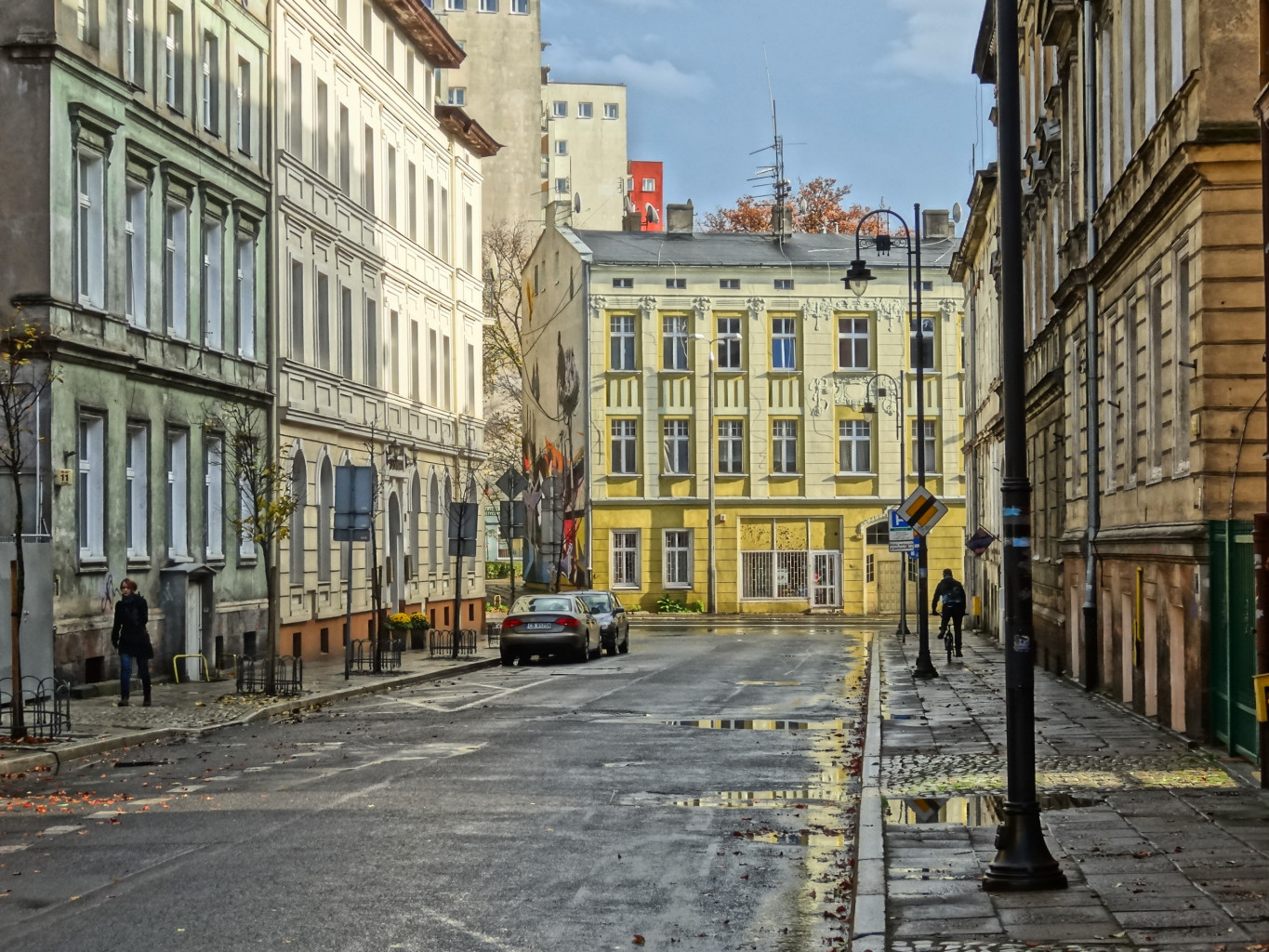
- Eastward view of Piotra Skargi street

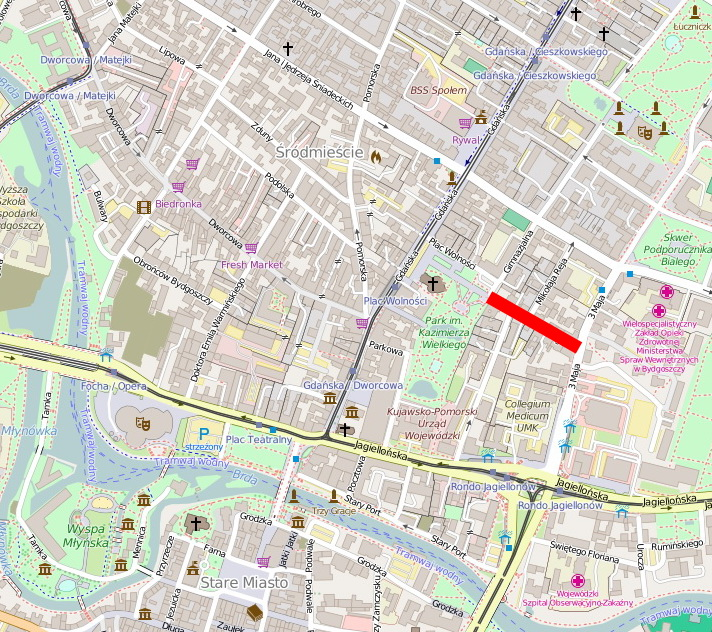
- Location of Piotra Skargi street
- Native name: Ulica Księdza Piotra Skargi (Polish)
- Former name: Hoffmann straße
- Namesake: Piotr Skarga
- Owner: City of Bydgoszcz
- Length: 180 m (590 ft); Google maps
- Area: Downtown district
- Location: Bydgoszcz, Poland

Construction
- Construction start: End of the 1860s
- Completed: 1872

Piotra Skargi street is a historical street of downtown Bydgoszcz.

== Location ==
Piotra Skargi Street is a rather short path, starting at Freedom Square or Plac Wolności, on the west side, and leading eastward to May 3rd street.

== History ==
While the main axis of downtown Bydgoszcz (Polish: Śródmieście), Gdańska Street, grew quickly after 1835, it took more time for side areas to develop as well. The first reference of Piotr Skarga street in city address book of Bromberg dates back to 1872.

First map to mention the street bears the year 1876.

Through history, the street bore the following names:

- 1870s-1920, Hoffmann straße;
- 1920–1940, Piotra Skargi street;
- 1940–1945, Hoffmann straße;
- Since 1945, Piotra Skargi street.

Actual namesake comes from Piotr Skarga (1536–1612), a Polish Jesuit, preacher, hagiographer, polemicist, and leading figure of the Counter-Reformation in the Polish–Lithuanian Commonwealth.

== Main edifices ==
=== Tenement at 2, in the corner with Casimir the Great Park and Freedom Square ===
Early 1870s

Eclecticism

The house at then Hoffmann straße 13 was initially the villa for the general commanding the 7th Infantry Brigade billeted in Bromberg, today in Pomorska Street. First tenant in 1872 was Ludwig von La Chevallerie. In the 1920s, the tenement was inhabited by displaced Poles that left former eastern territories, or Kresy, as a consequence of the Peace of Riga: Maria Górska and her family. Today, the edifice houses the Regional Inspectorate for the Protection of the Environment (Polish: Wojewódzki Inspektorat Ochrony Środowiska w Bydgoszczy).

The house stands out first by its entry porch adorned with stained glass protect the gate. A frieze with floral motifs runs all around the top. The facade on Piotra Skargi Street shows delicate decoration on the second floor: cartouches displaying human figure, lintels supported by corbels. A terrace stands on the side of the villa giving onto Freedom Square, adorned by pilasters on the ground floor. The building has been extended in the 1970s with a glass extension on park.

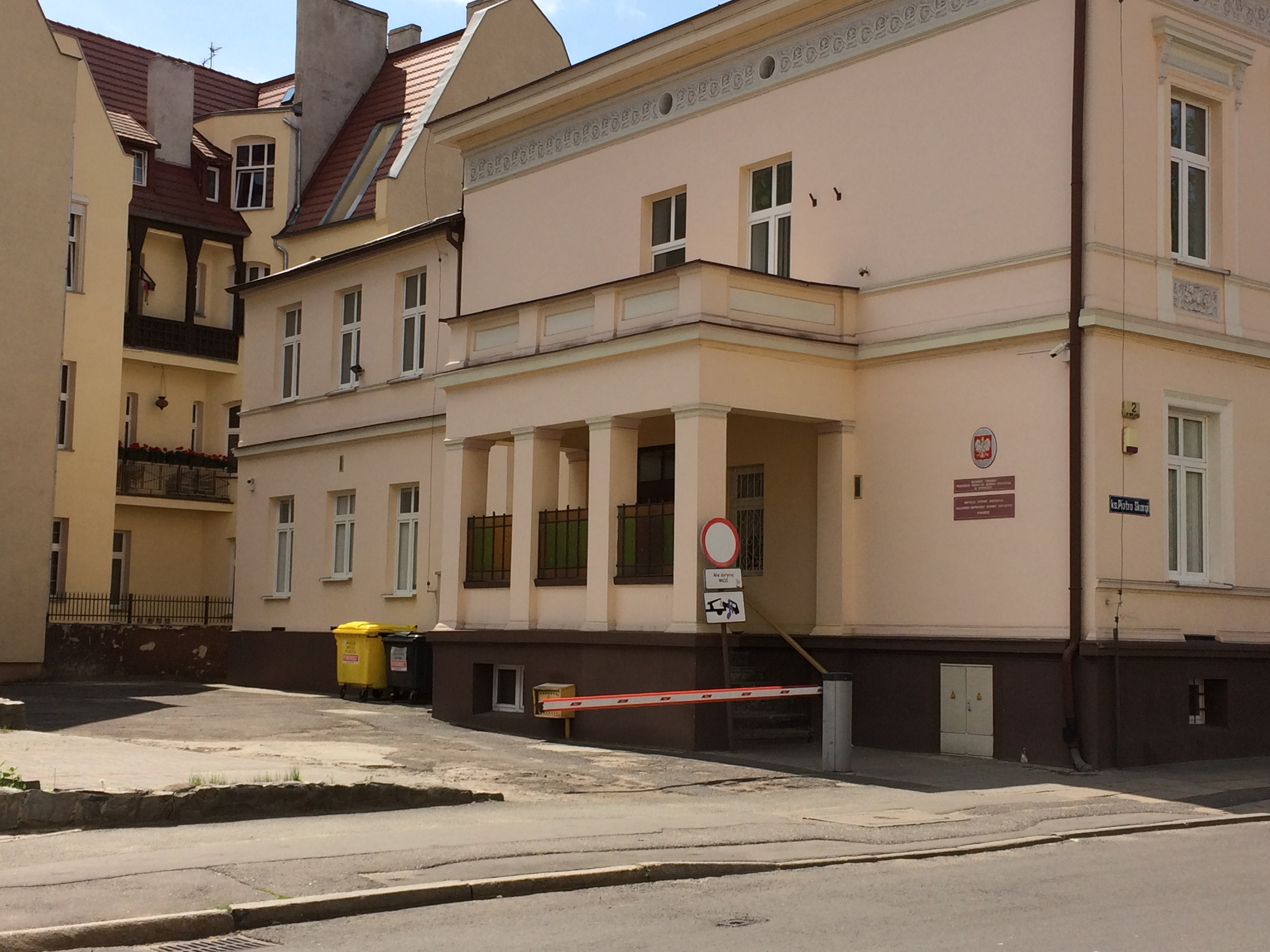
The gate with its loggia

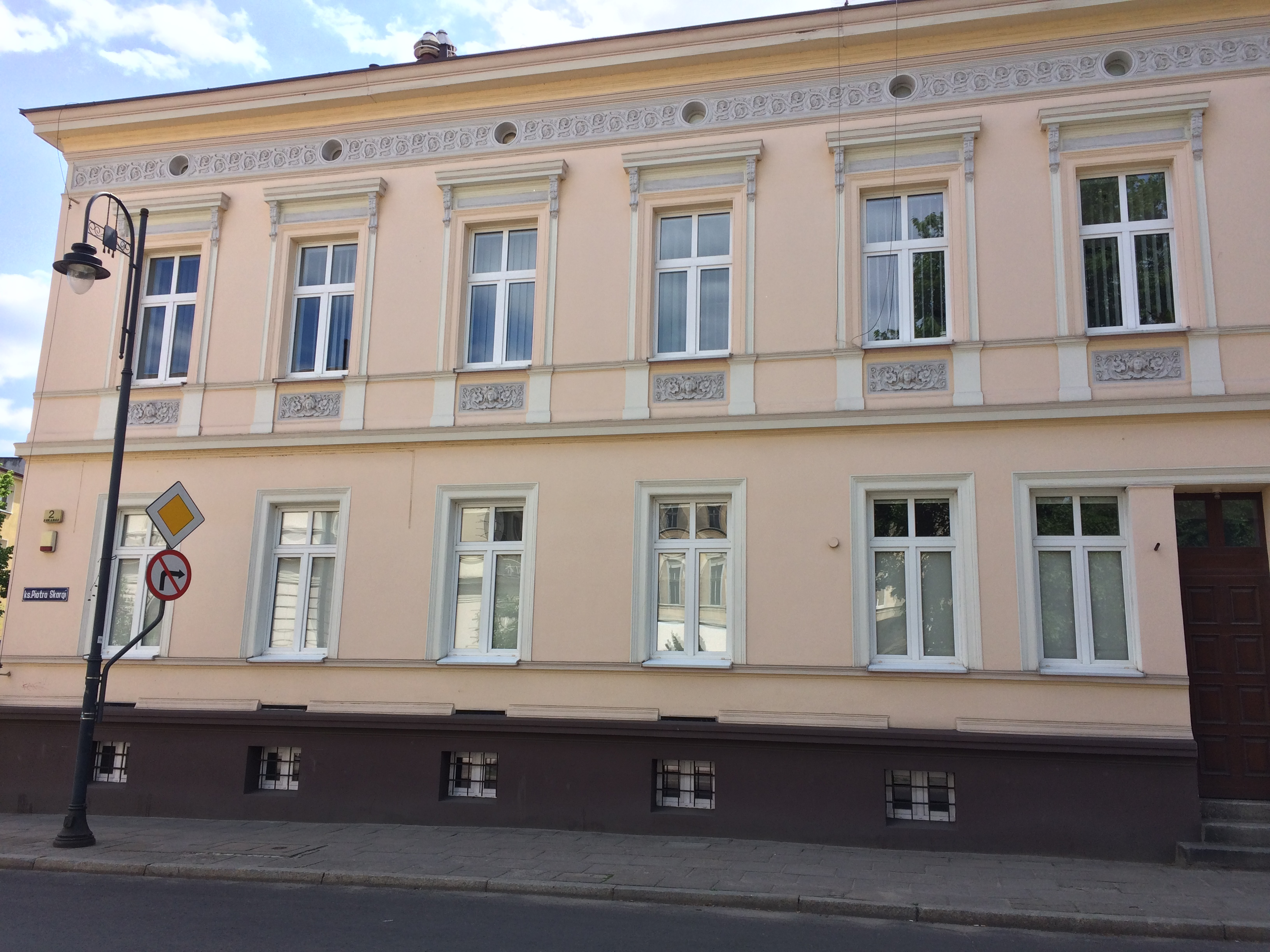
Facade on Piotra Skargi Street

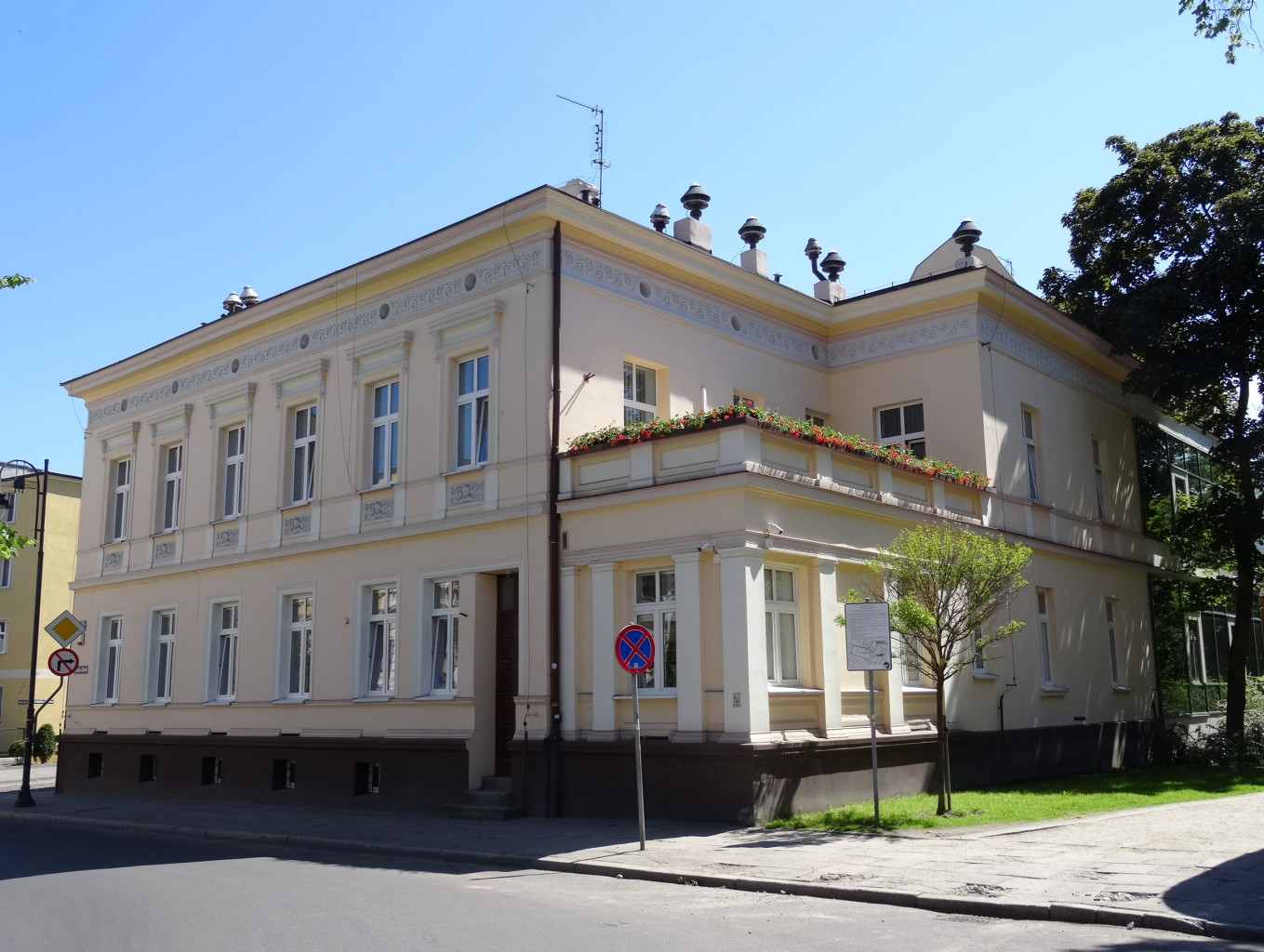
View of the terrace

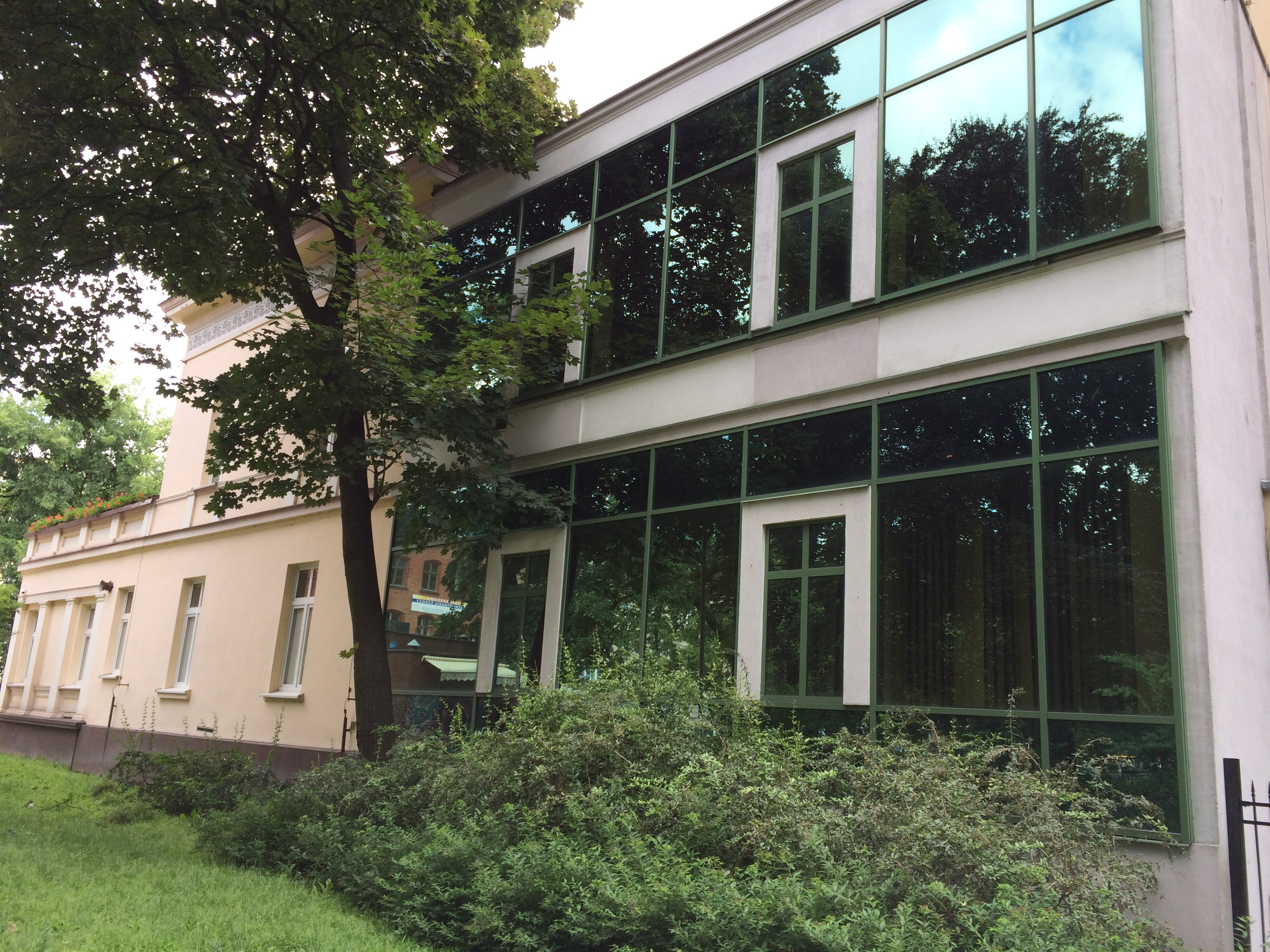
Facade on the park

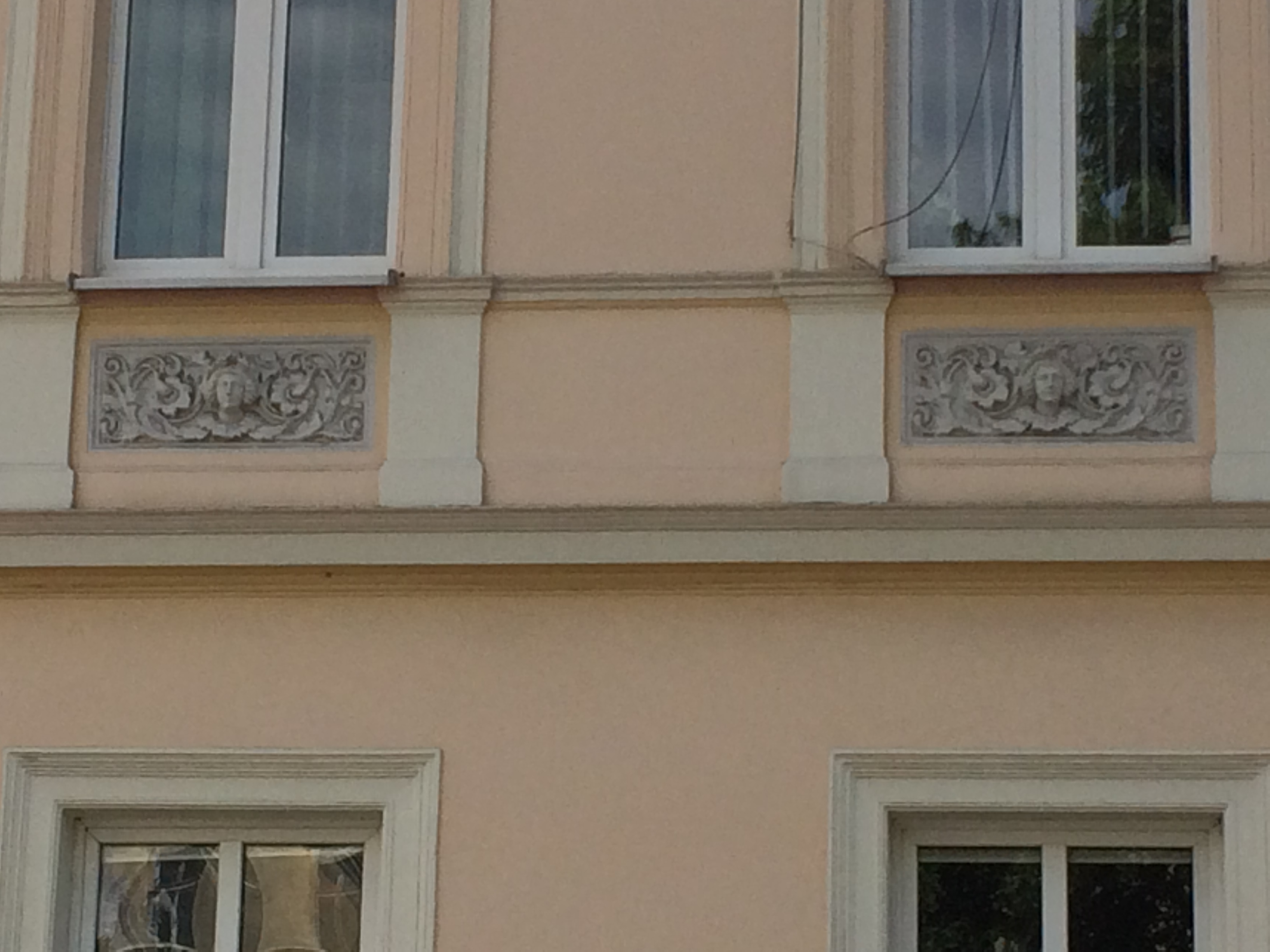
Detail of the cartouches

=== Hugo Bille Villa, at 3, corner with Freedom Square ===
Registered on Kuyavian-Pomeranian Voivodeship heritage list, Reg.A/263/1, May 28, 1991

1886, by Józef Swiecicki and Anton Hoffmann

Neo-Baroque

The villa was designed and built in 1886 for a well-known Bydgoszcz doctor, Hugo Bille. At then Hoffmann straße 1&1a, the ophthalmologist and hospital doctor ran a medical cabinet. Dr. Bille was also a practitioner at the Luisen Stift (in present time Swederowo district) and at the Deaconess hospital (in today's Bielawy district). He was additionally the landlord of a vast tenement at today's 9 Zduny street, at the corner with Warmińskiego street.

In 1910, it was owned by a pensioner Mr Dentler, who had as tenant Julius Von Rogowski, the General Commanding the 4th Artillerie Brigade in Bromberg. After 1920, another physician, Jan Król lived there. He was the owner of the clinic at Gimnazjalna 2a, specialised in nervous diseases. Since 1992, the edifice houses a restaurant, "Villa calvados".

The main elevation of the villa gives onto a small garden, neighbouring Plac Wolności. It has a neoclassical architecture, with a bulky middle avant-corps, highlighted by a semicircle one floor high second avant-corps. the latter is adorned with columns, all the ground floor windows being arched. Larger openings appear on the first floor, with balustrade and pilasters and lintel for chambranle. A small frieze tops the main avant-corps, and a corbel table caps it all. The gate on Piotra Skargi street displays a nice semicircle transom light and delicate carved motifs.

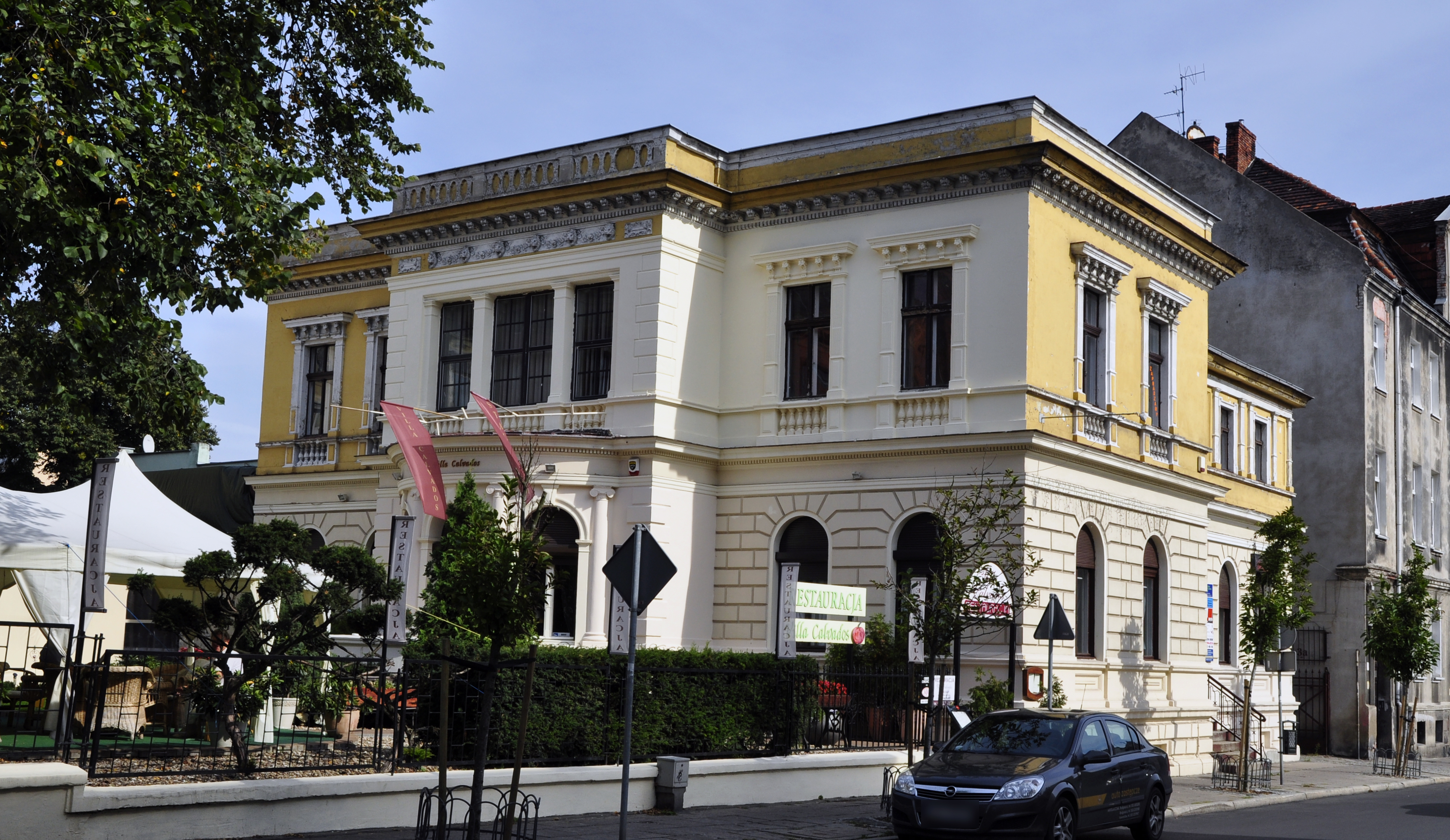
View from Plac Wolności

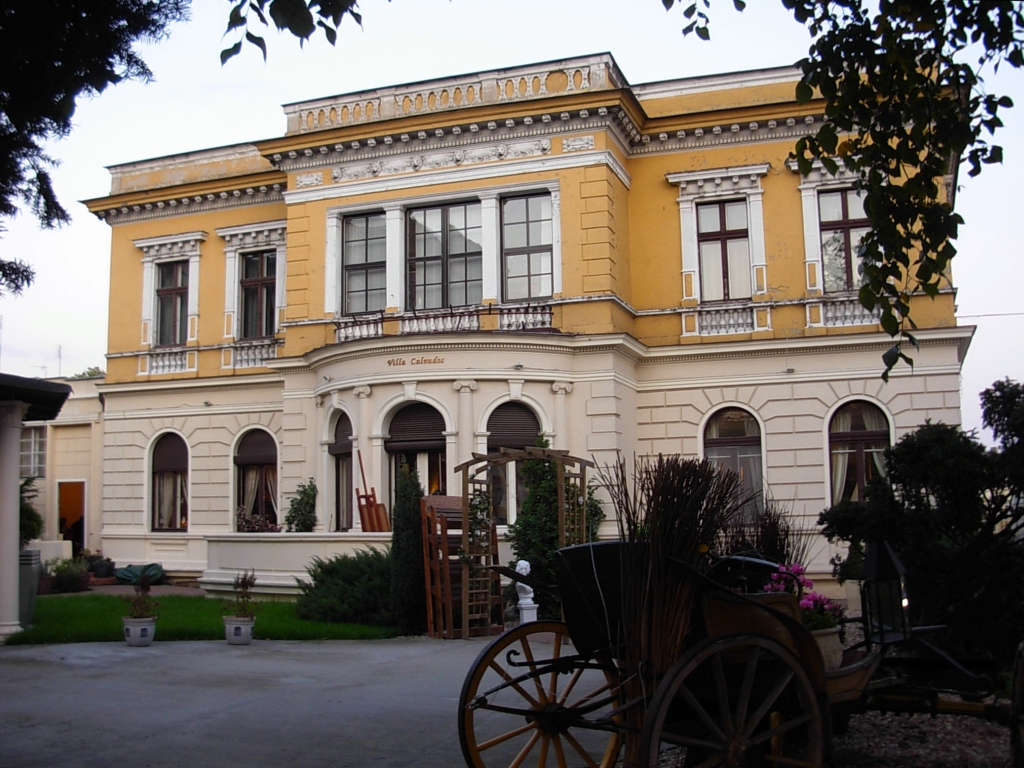
Main elevation

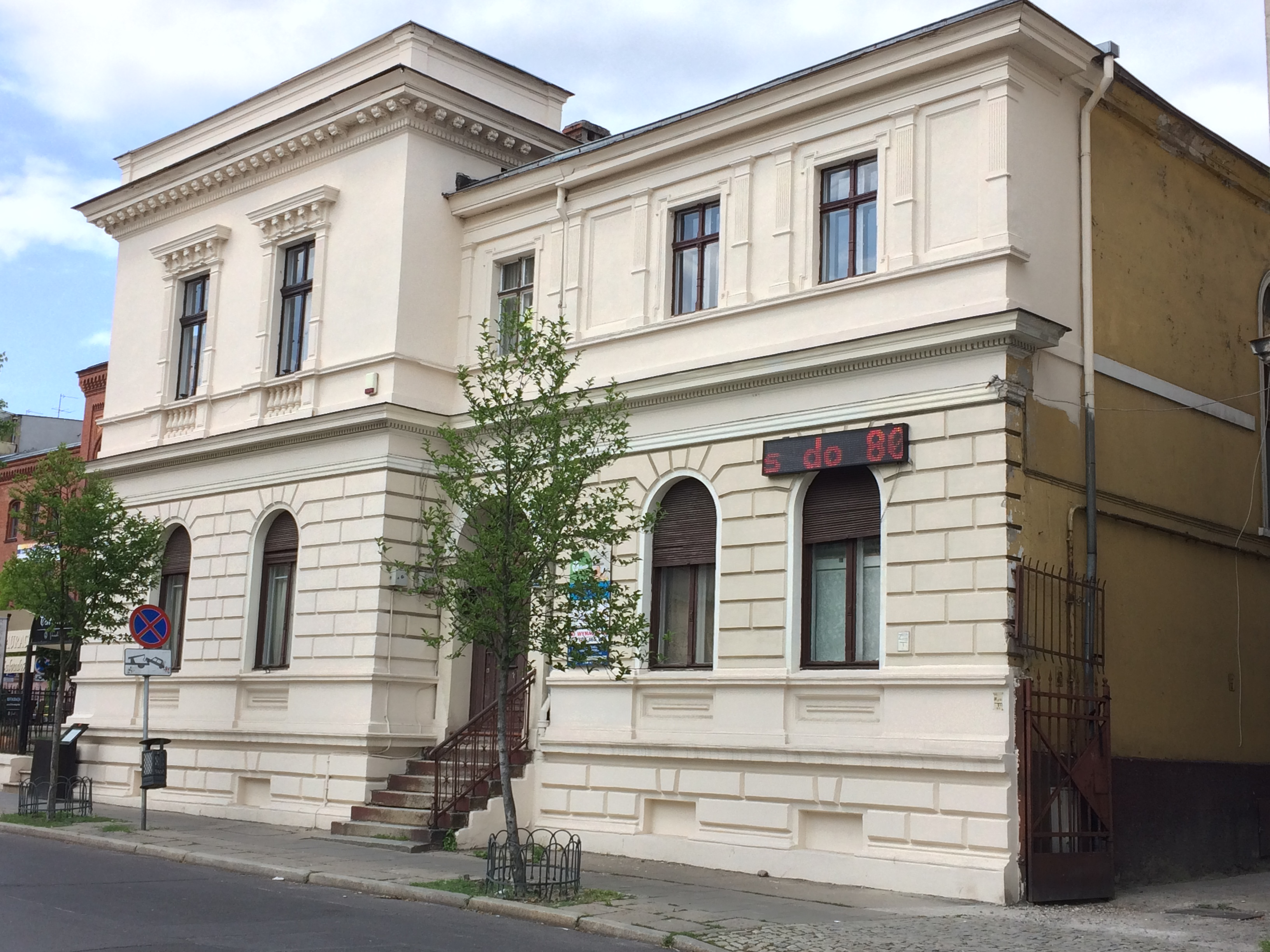
View from the street

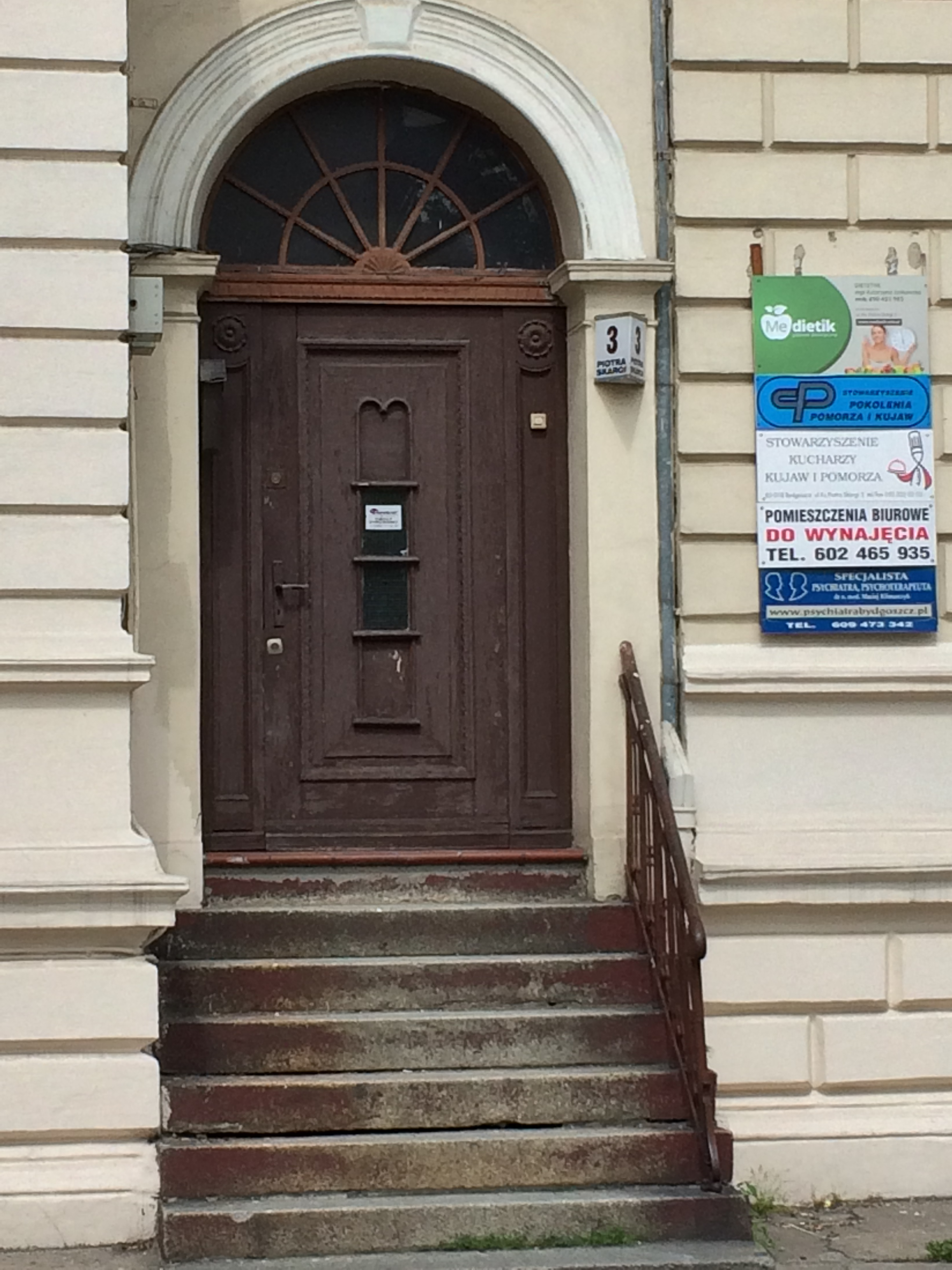
Gate on Piotra Skargi Street

=== Tenement at 5, corner with corner with Mikołaja Reja Street ===
1880s

Secession

This tenement at then Hoffmann straße 2 was the property of Ms Raaß in 1882, then of Emma Stengert.

None of the original frontage decoration survived. The main elevation is topped by a large triangular pediment. Side facade on Mikołaj Rej street displays a mural painting, "Self-determination" (Polish: Samookreślenie), one of 20 pieces in Bydgoszcz streets.

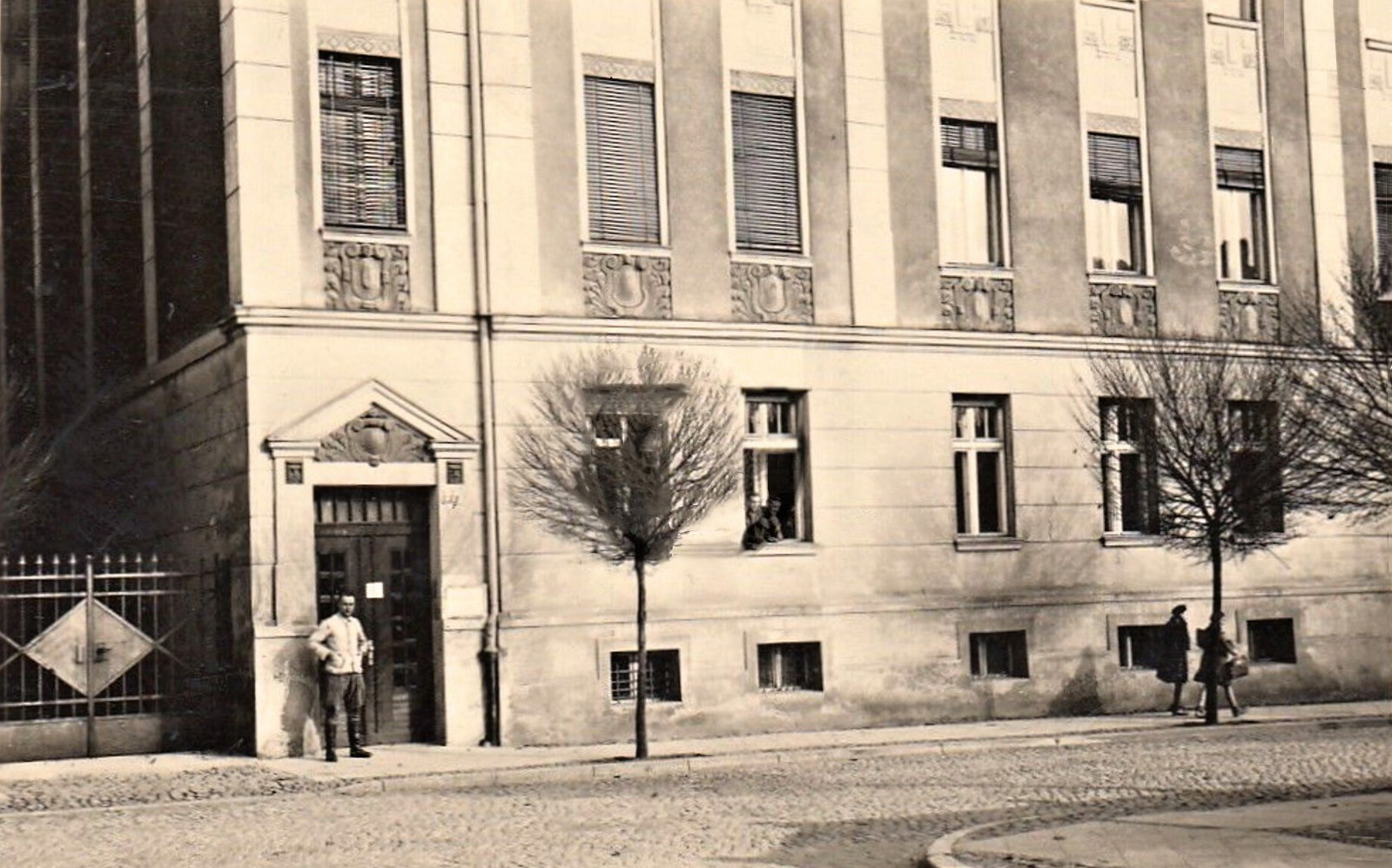
View ca 1945

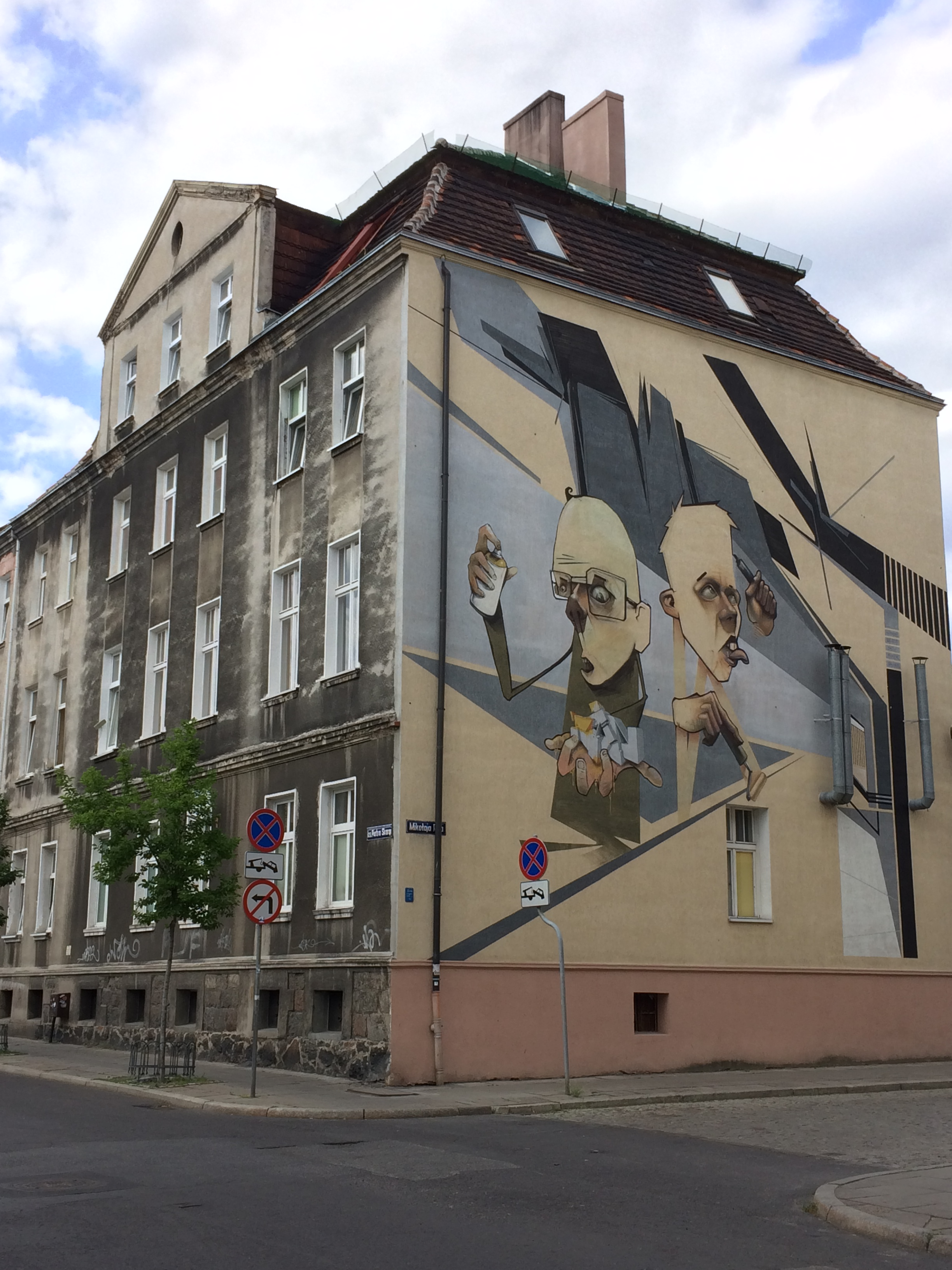
View from the street

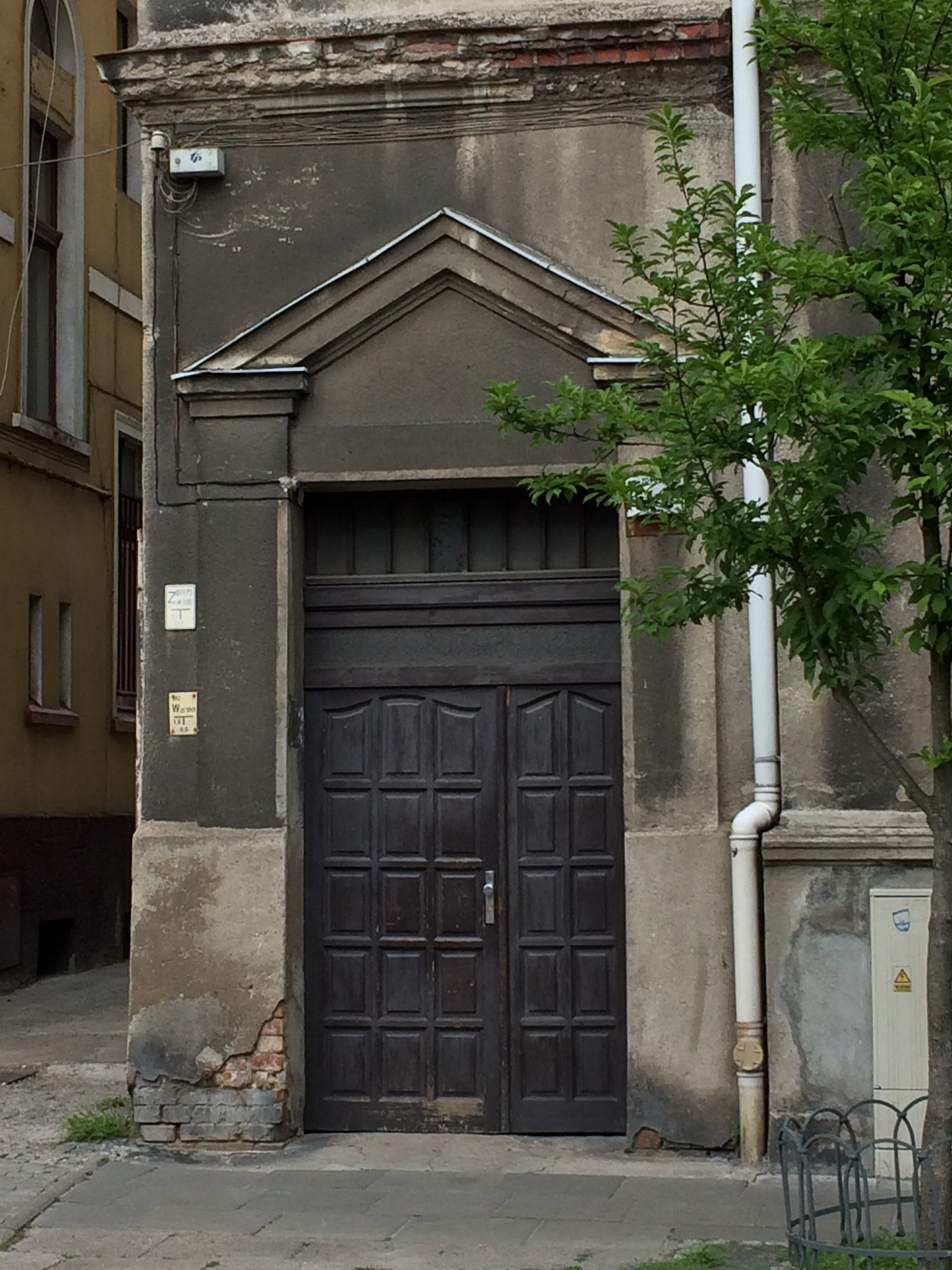
Main gate

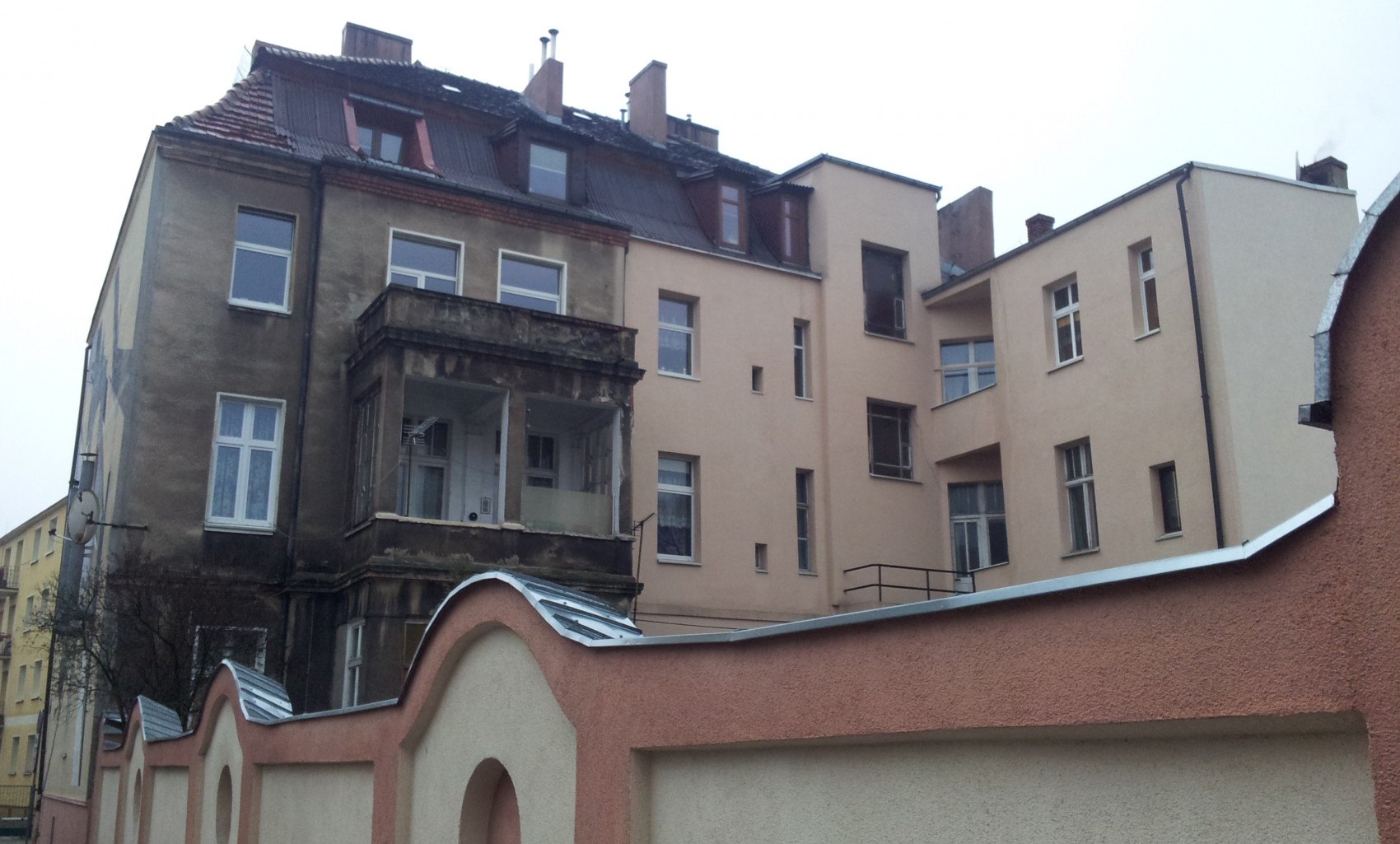
Back view

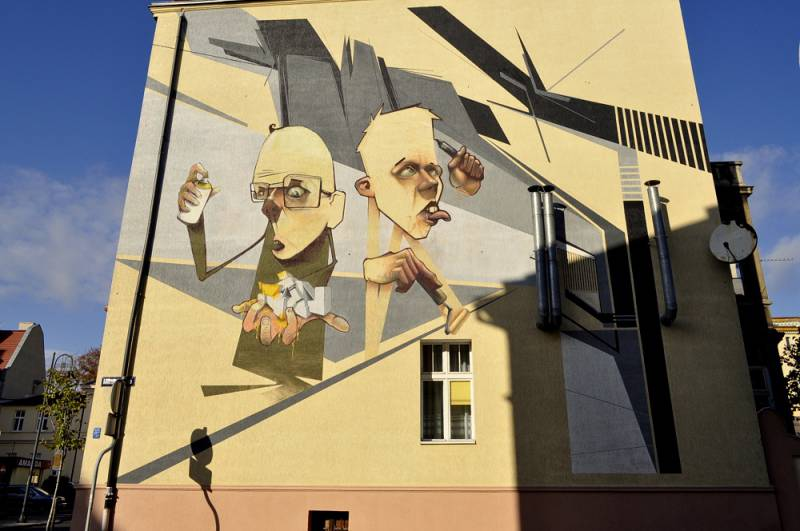
Wall painting at Nr.5

=== Tenement at 6 ===
1880s

Eclecticism

This tenement at then Hoffmann straße 11 has been designed as habitation building for pensioners.

The right-side facade displays a mural painting, Śniadanie Mistrzów (English: Breakfast of Champions) realized by three local artists, Spectrum, Etam and Pain. This work is a part of an ensemble of more than 20 pieces scattered in Bydgoszcz streets.

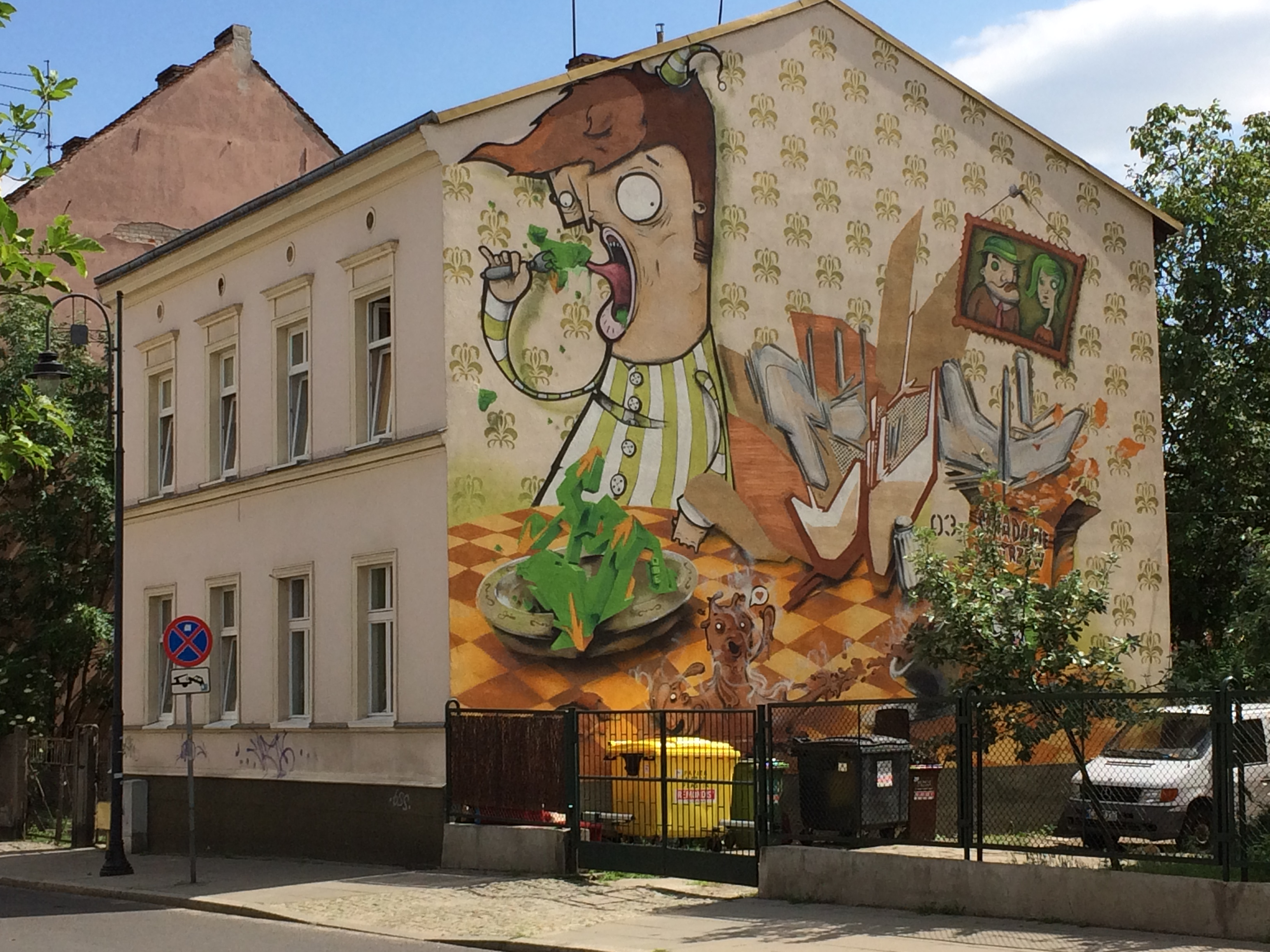
View from the street

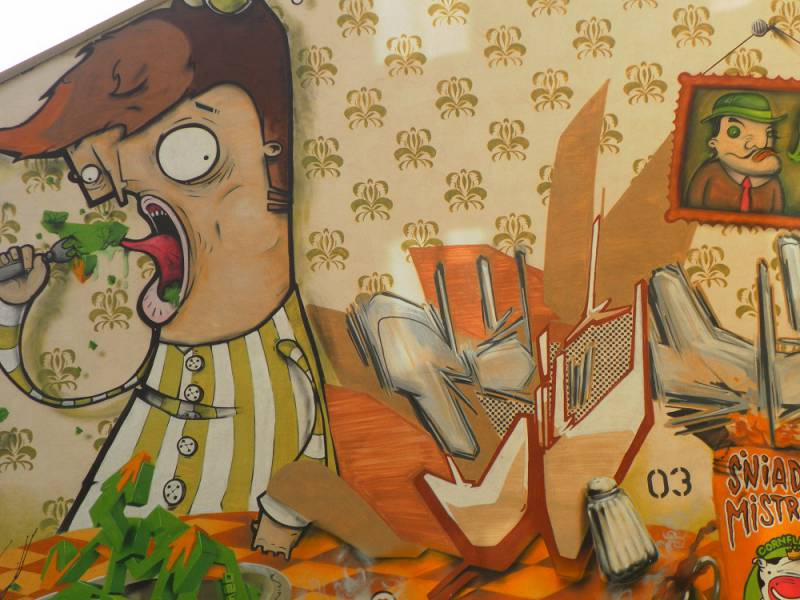
Wall painting at Nr.6

=== Tenement at 7, corner with Mikołaja Reja Street ===
Early 1880s

Eclecticism

Dr Agnes Schulß, a head teacher, was the first landlord of this tenement at then Hoffmann straße 3. She lived there until the end of World War I. Today, the edifice houses, among others, the "Paderewski Music Society in Bydgoszcz" (Polish: Towarzystwo Muzyczne im. I. J. Paderewskiego w Bydgoszczy), a cultural association engaged in the development of music and musical culture in the city. This association organizes every 3 years the "International Paderewski Piano Competition" in Bydgoszcz: the 10th occurrence will happen from 6 to 20 November 2016.

The facade on Piotra Skargi Street is rather common, except some nice palmette motifs inscribed in cartouches. On the other hand, the elevation on Mikołaj Rej street reveals more decorative features with vegetal ornaments and a stylized festoon topped by an oeil-de-boeuf. This side of the tenement gives access to a garden, overlooked by a balcony.

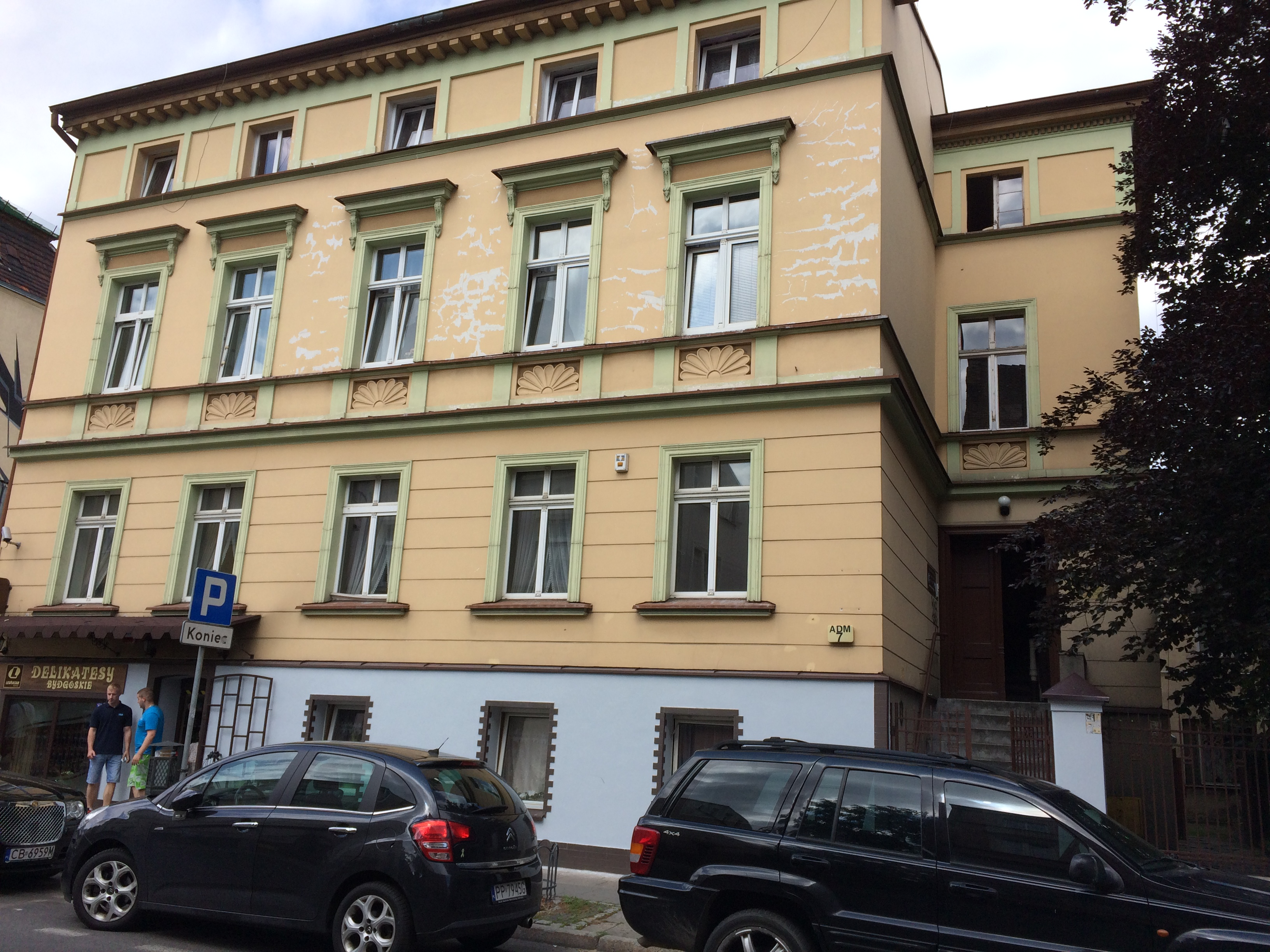
Main elevation from the street

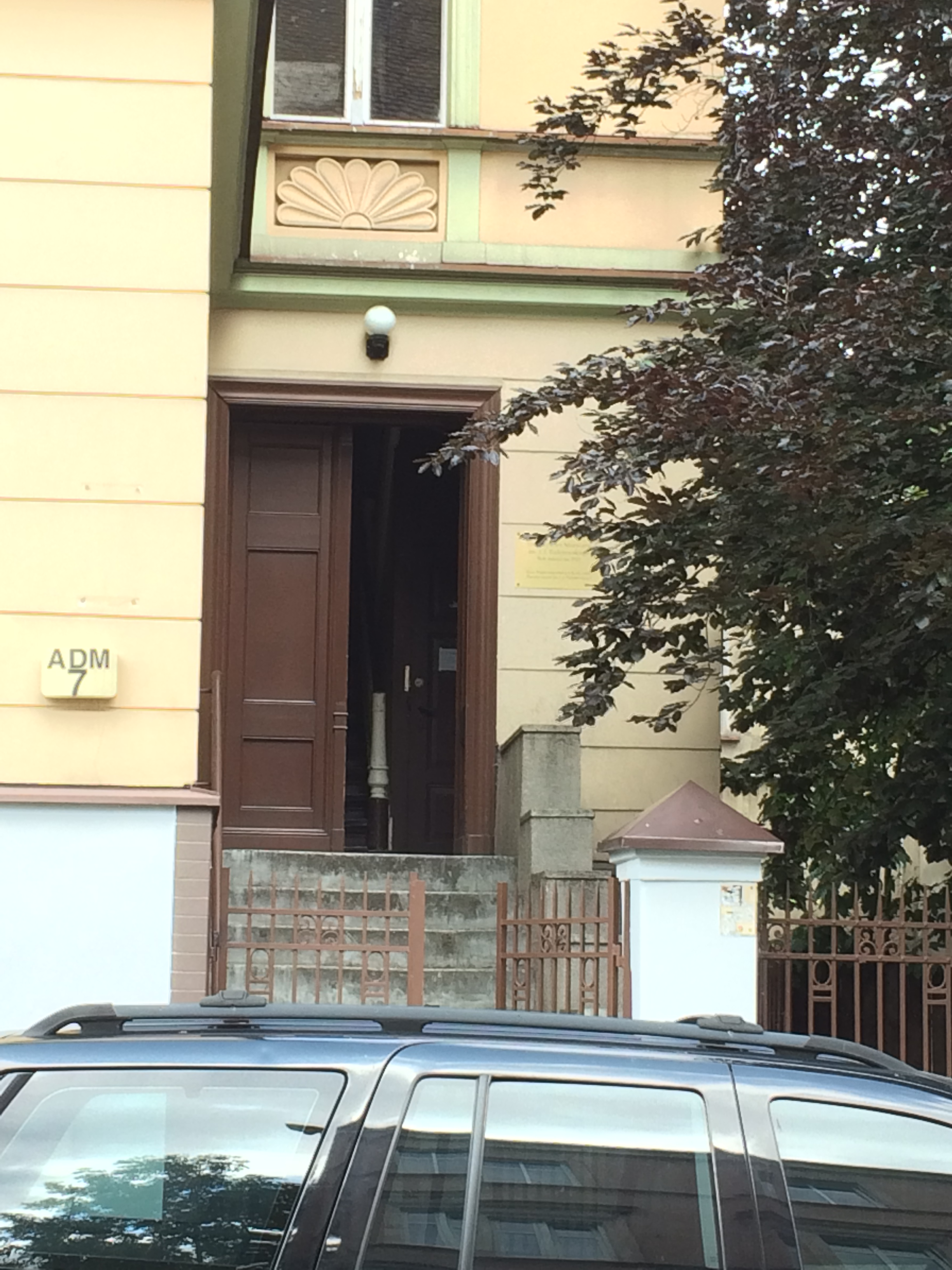
Entry gate

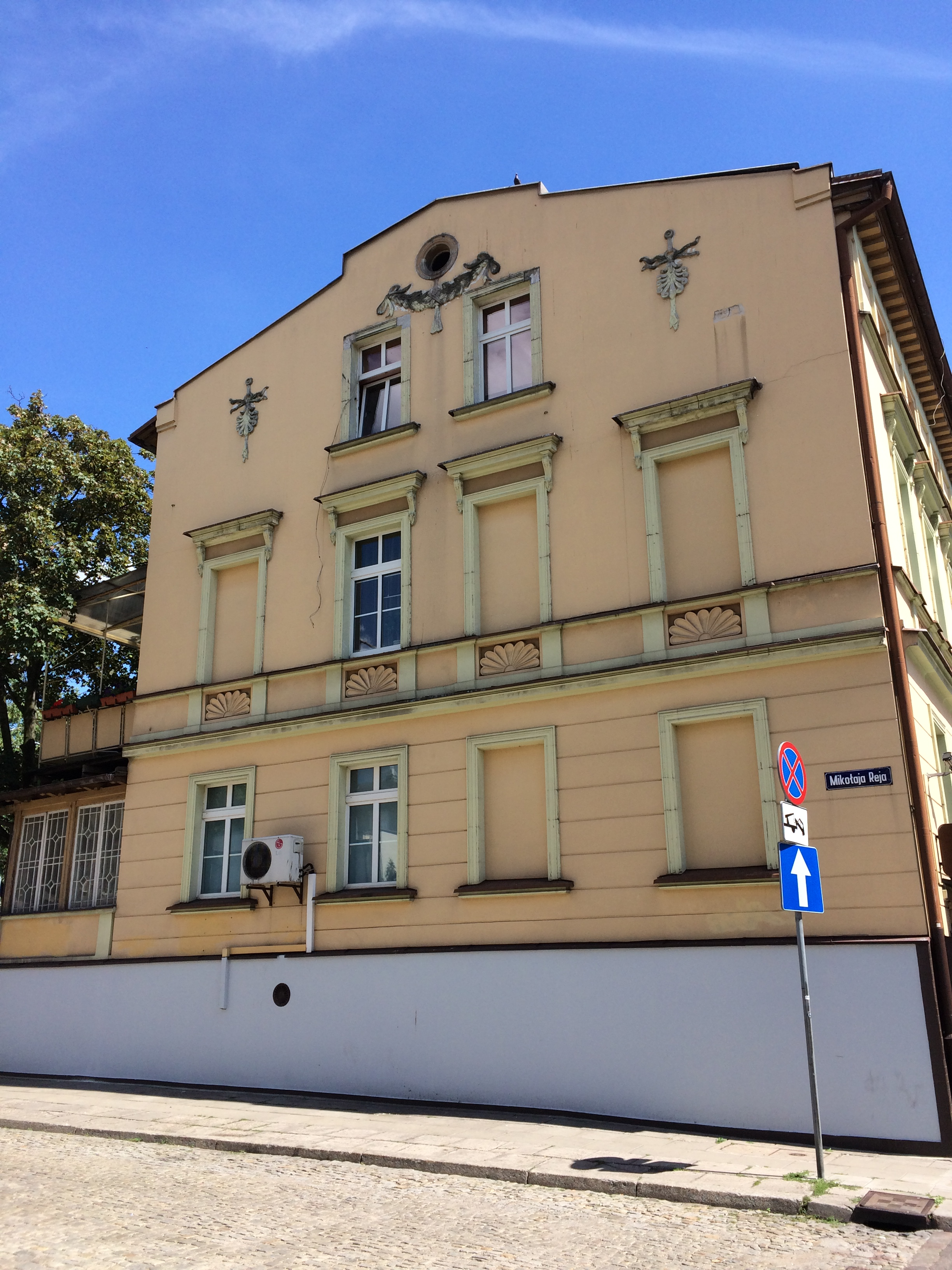
Side facade view

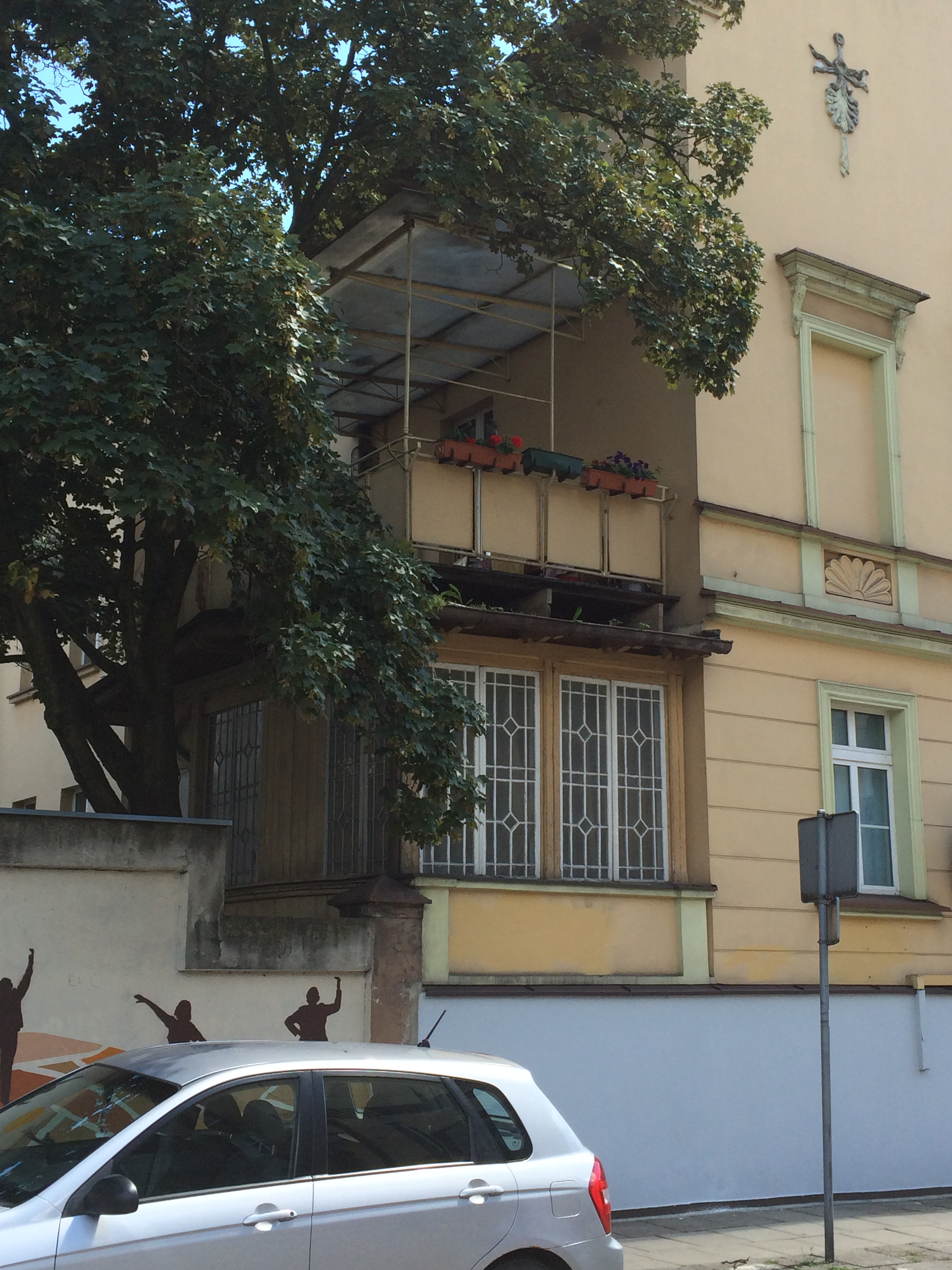
Garden and balcony

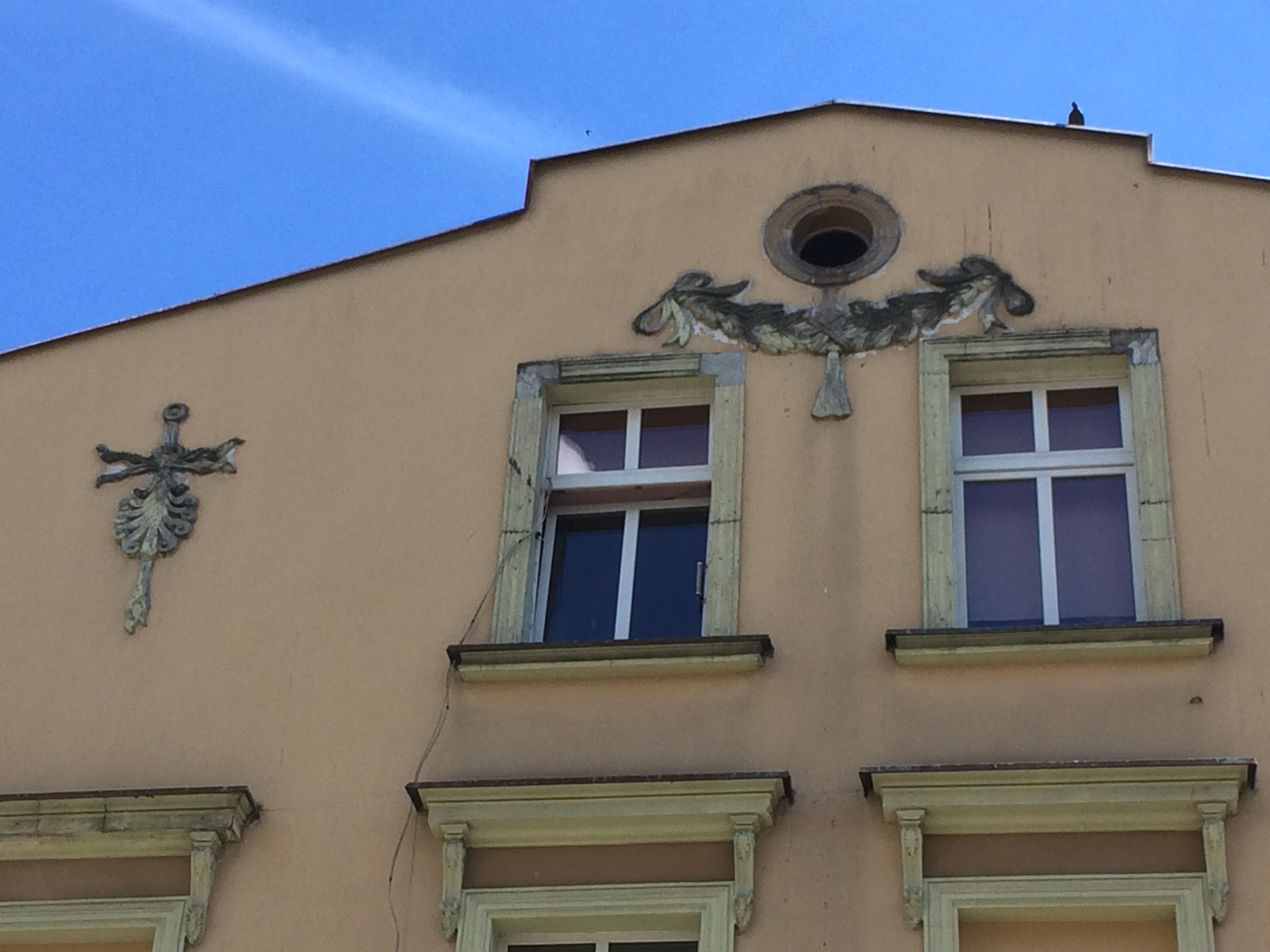
Side facade ornamentation

=== Old dairy factory, at 9 ===
1880s

Eclecticism

This tenement at then Hoffmann straße 4 was the location of a steam powered dairy factory, in the backyard. Established in the 1880s by Heinrich Engell, then taken over by Michael Diethelm in 1893. The factory which bore his name (Polish: Młeczarnia Diethelm) ran till the outbreak of World War II.

The tenement itself is pretty common. On the left side, in the courtyard, old brick buildings from the dairy factory are still visible, with the main house, the boiler house and the stables.

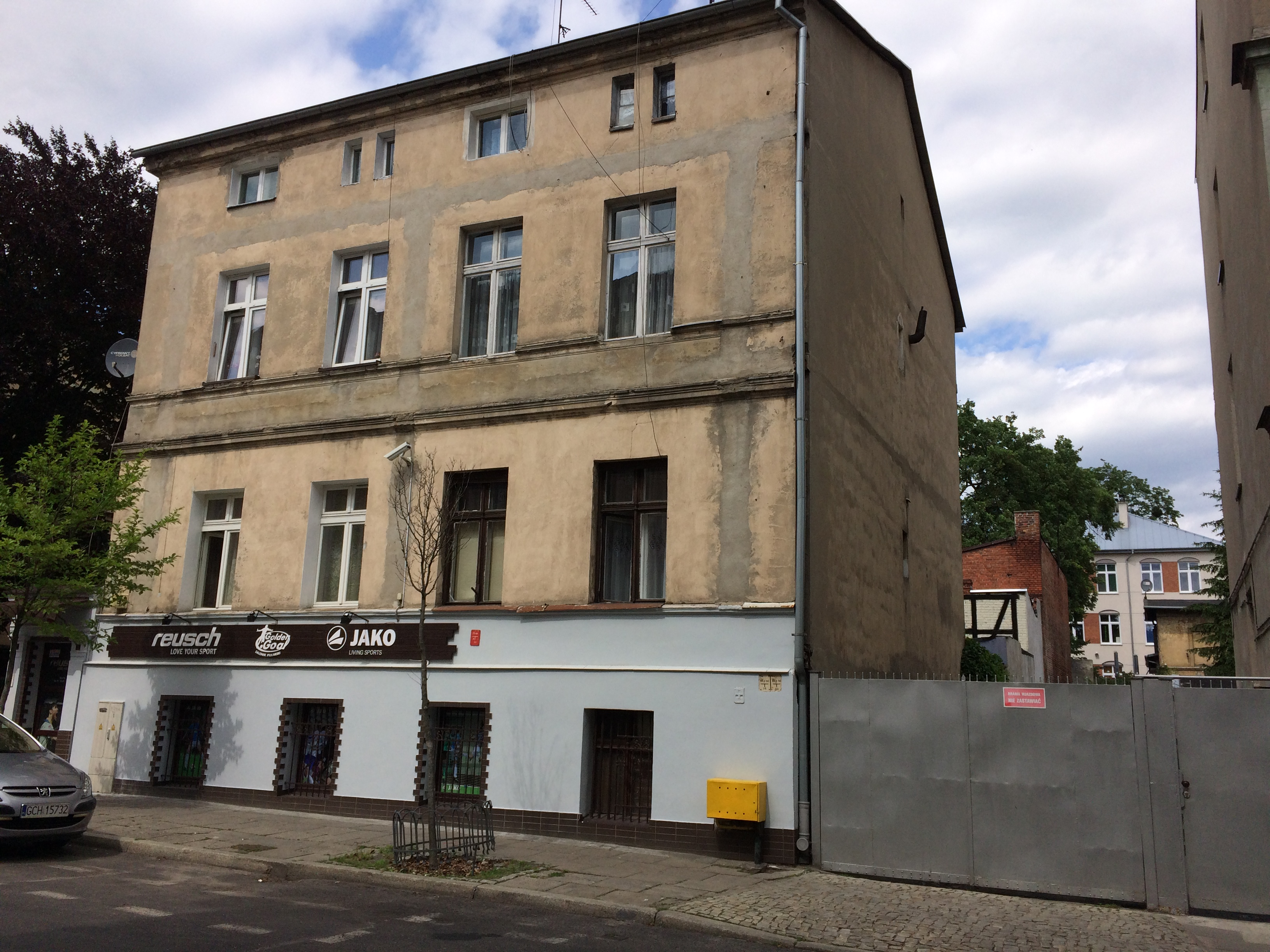
Main elevation

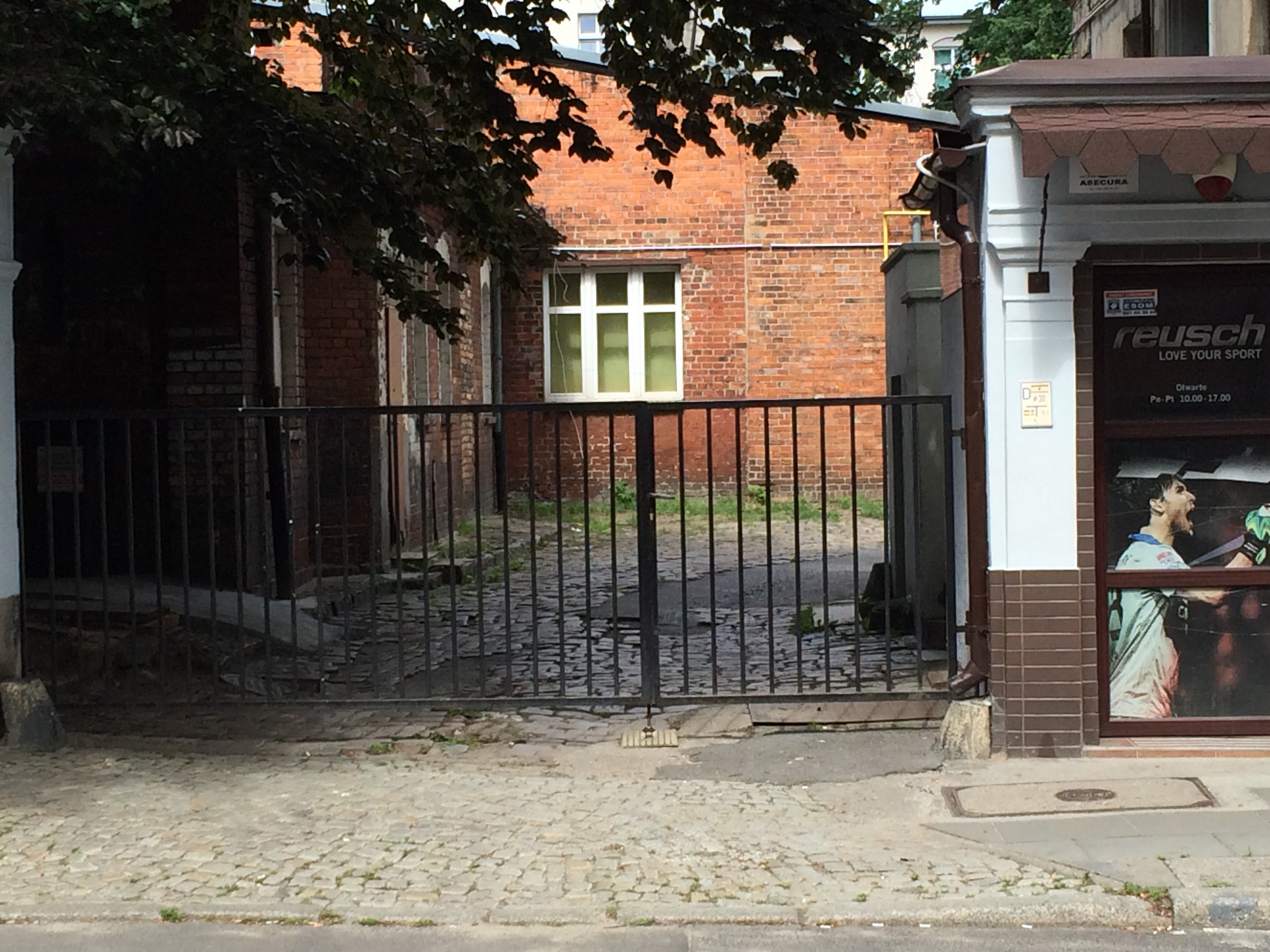
Backyard buildings from the dairy era

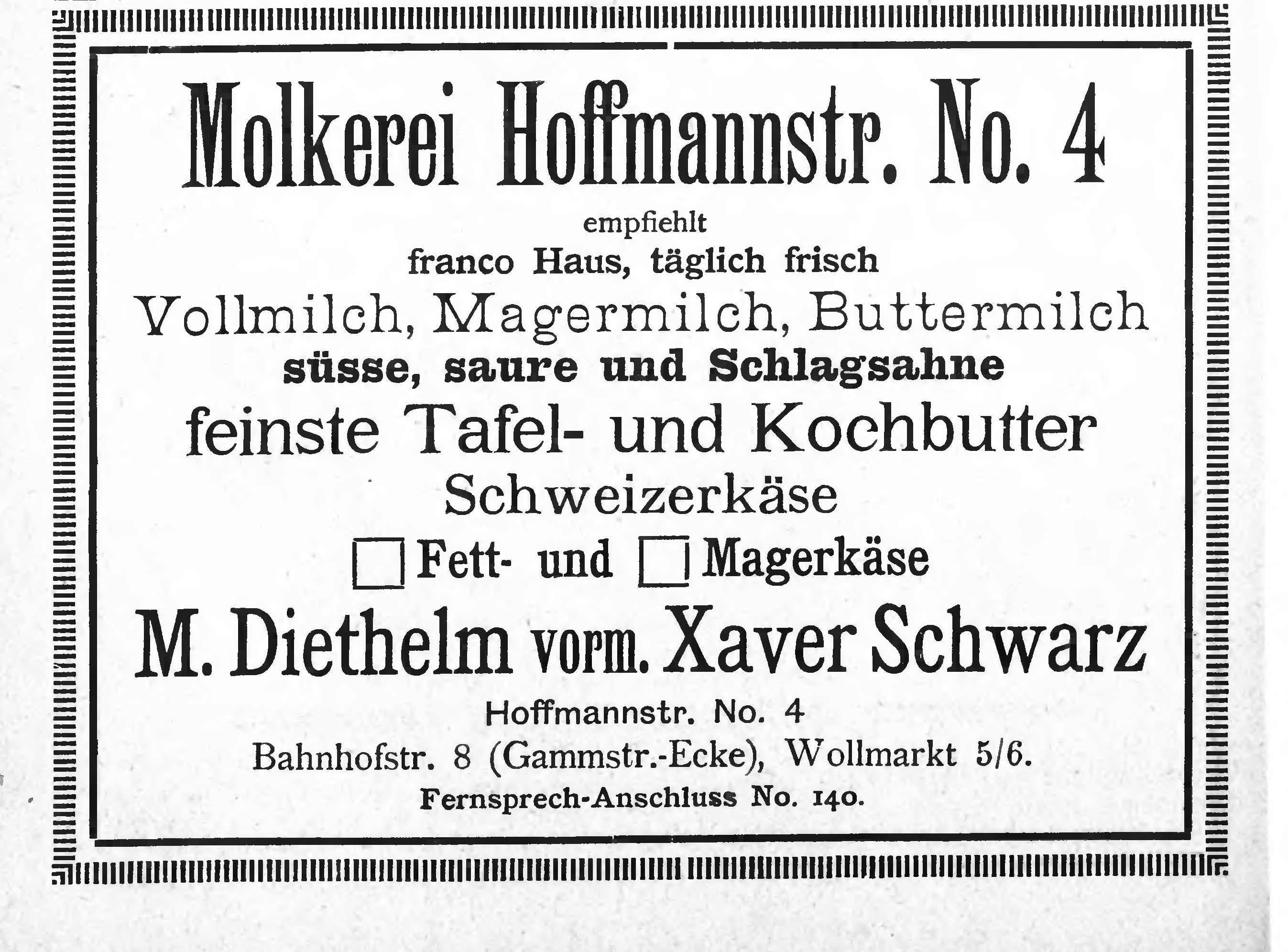
Advertising for Diethelm's dairy factory in 1898

=== Tenement at 10 ===
1876

Eclecticism

This tenement at then Hoffmann straße 9 was first owned by Oswald Wene, a police administrative assistant. It then moved to the hands of pensioners, Mr Sieg and Ms ßommer.

The tenement, with typical eclectic features, was mainly a habitation house. It still retains window pediments on the first floor, festoon motifs at the top of the frontage, as well as an original porch on the side. The edifice has been renovated in 2019.

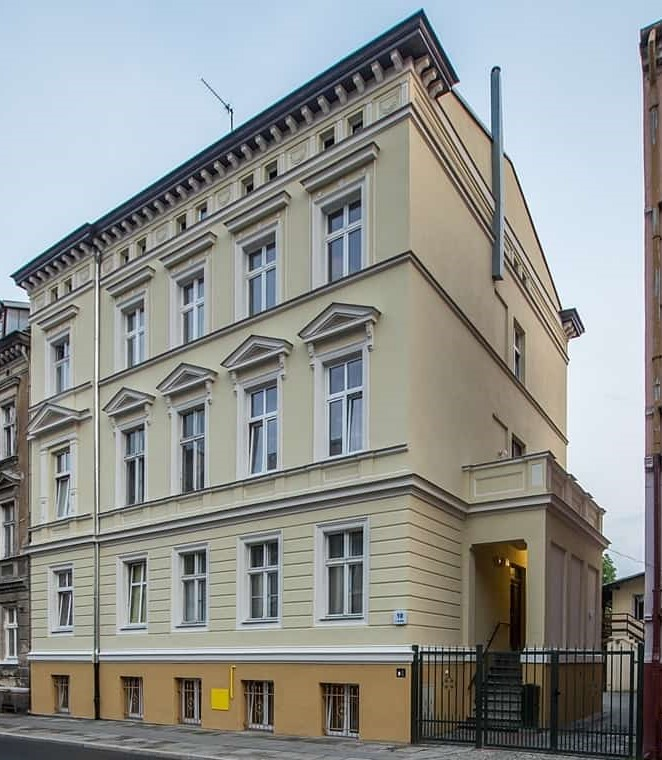
Main elevation after refurbishing

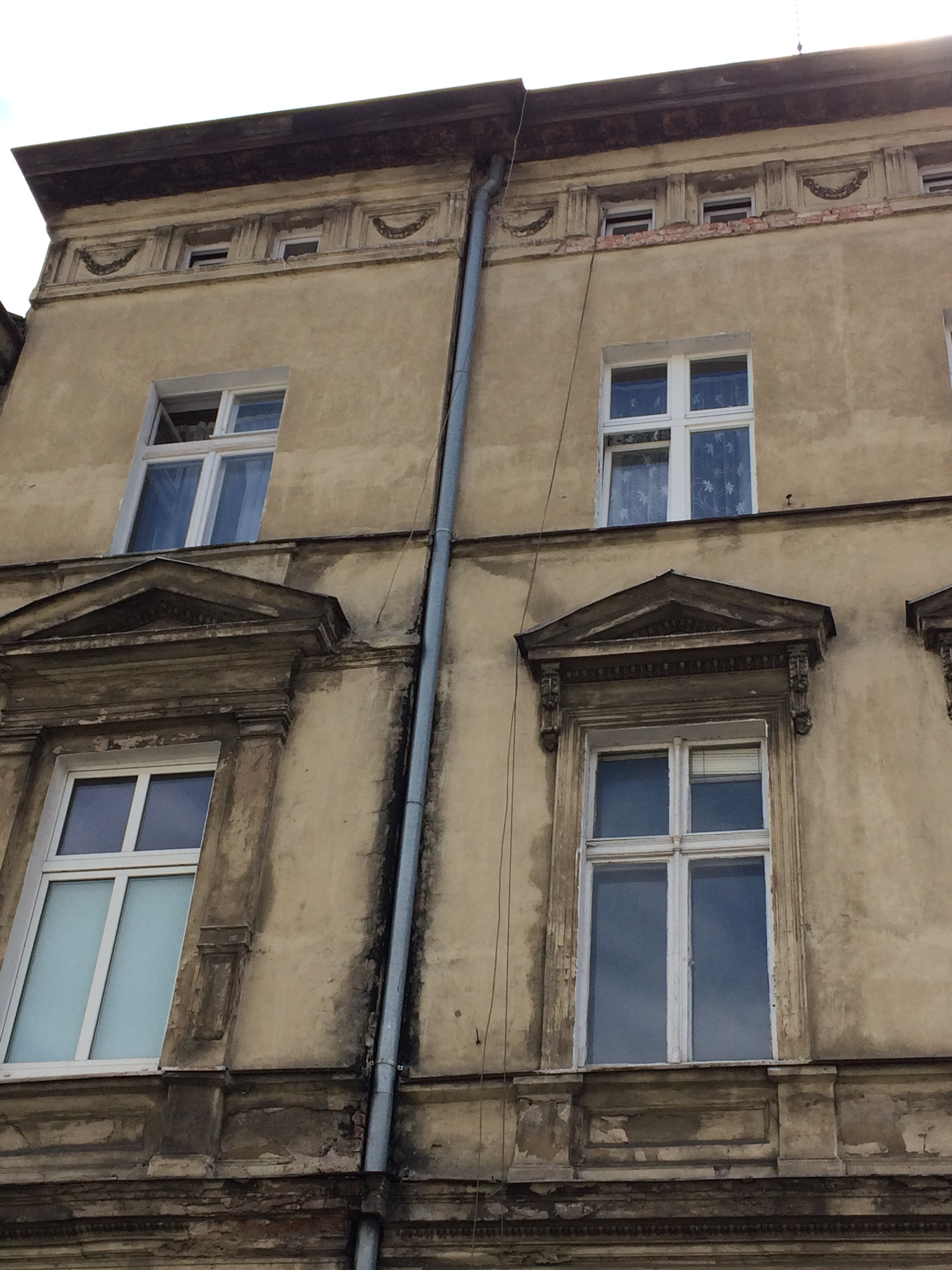
Detail of ornamentation

=== Tenement at 12 ===
1877-1878

Neoclassical architecture

This tenement at then Hoffmann straße 8 has been designed as a habitation building. In the 1880s, one of the tenants was Ernst Schmid director of the Civic School for Girls (German: Städtische mitlere Töchterschule), in nearby Konarskiego street, now the building of the Bydgoszcz Art School.

The elevation has neoclassical ornamentation: triangular pediments at first floor windows, corbel table at the top, and shed dormer on the gable. The entry still retains its original numbering, "8", painted on the wall.

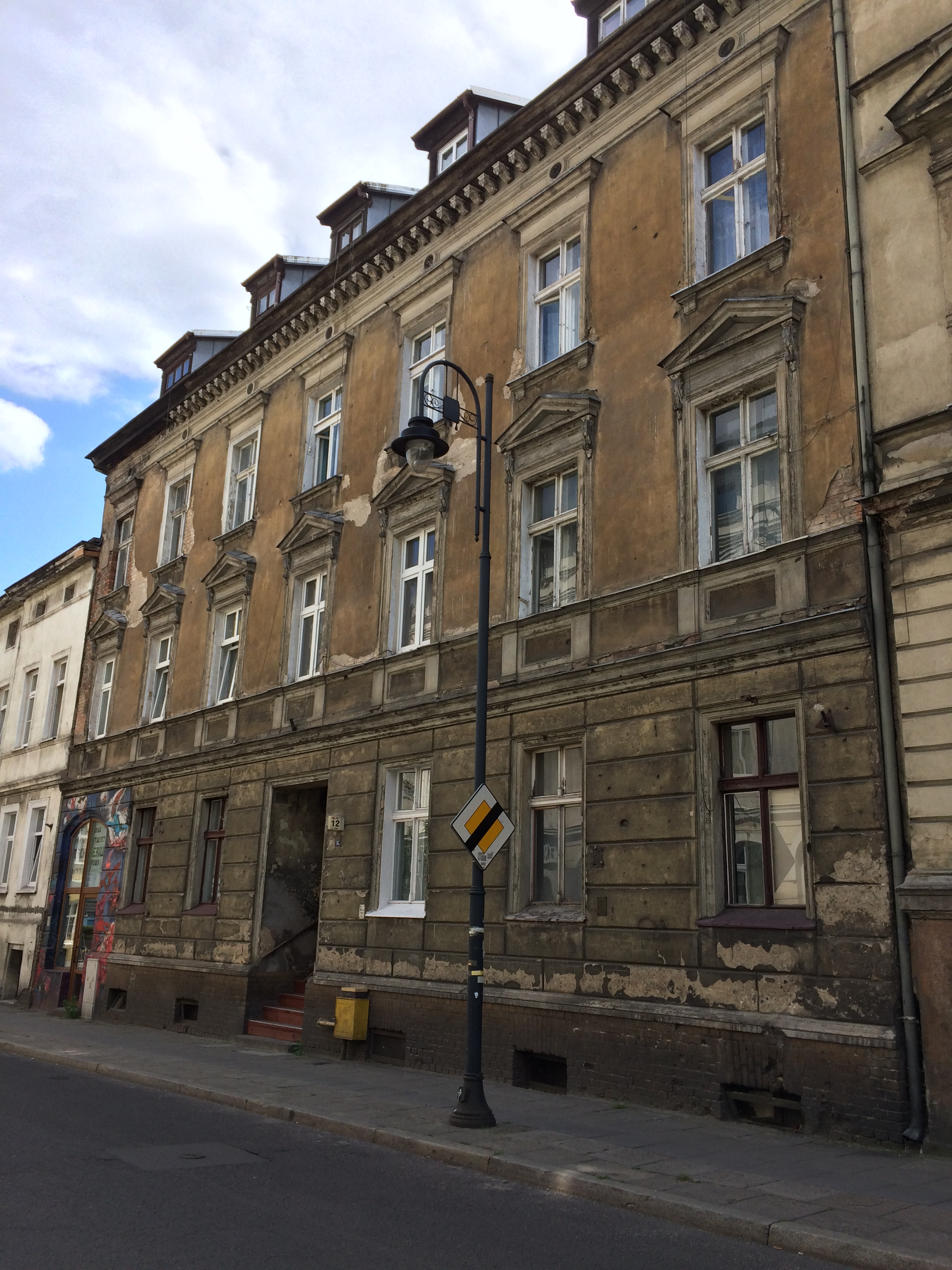
Main facade

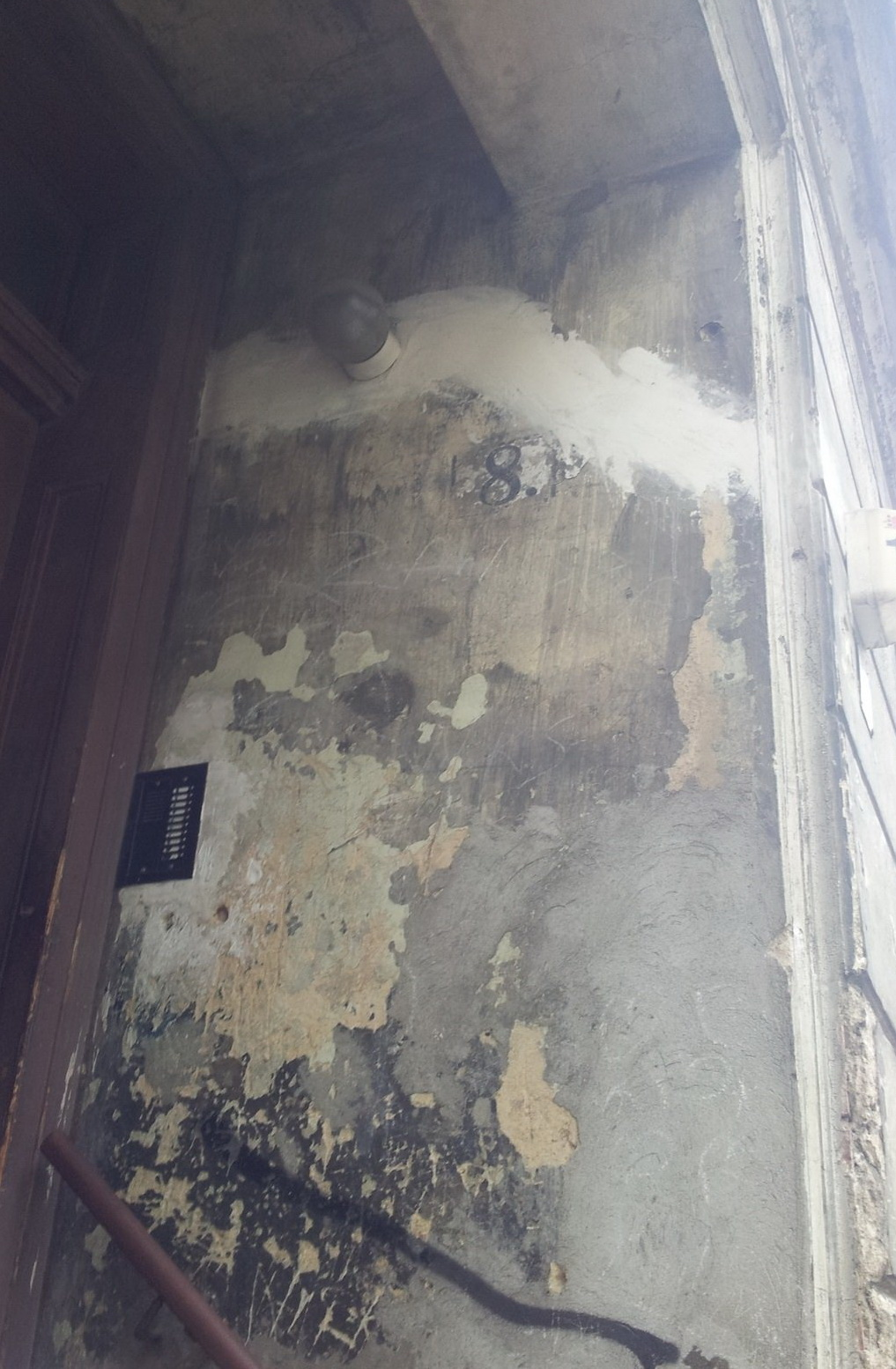
Entry wall with its original number

=== Tenement at 13, corner with 3 Maja street ===
1894-1895

Eclecticism & Neo-Renaissance

This tenement at then 6 Hoffmann straße has been designed as a habitation building. In the 1890s, one of the tenants were Clara & Hans Joop, photographs, relatives of Theodore Joop, famous photograph of the city: Hans and Clara ran the studio located at Wilhelm straße 15, now Focha Street.

The architecture reflects main features of end of 19th century eclecticism, so present in the streets of Bydgoszcz (e.g. Dworcowa Street, Gdańska Street or Pomorska Street). One can notice arched windows on the ground floor, designed to house shops or restaurant. A small balcony overhangs the corner entry.

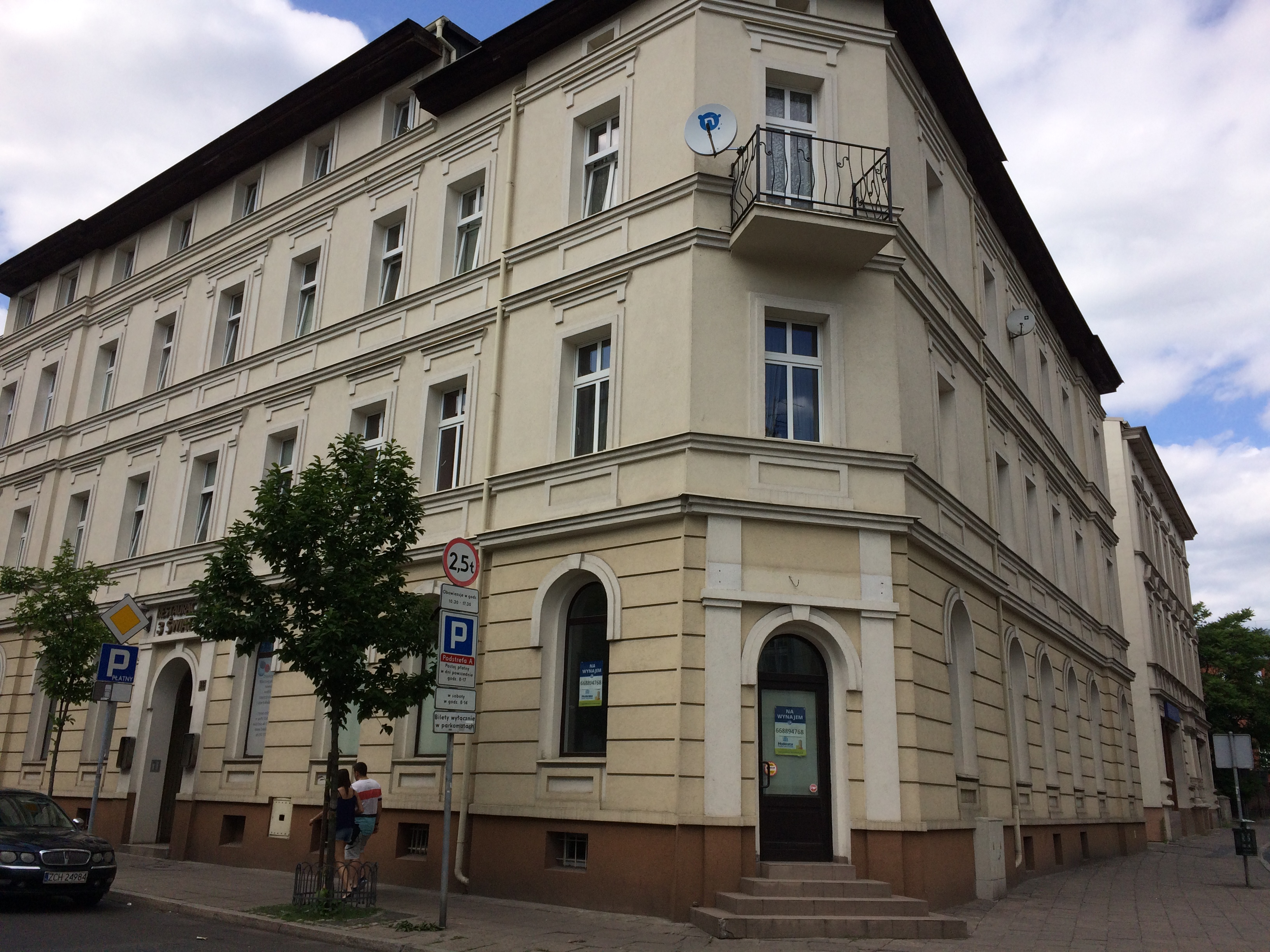
Corner view

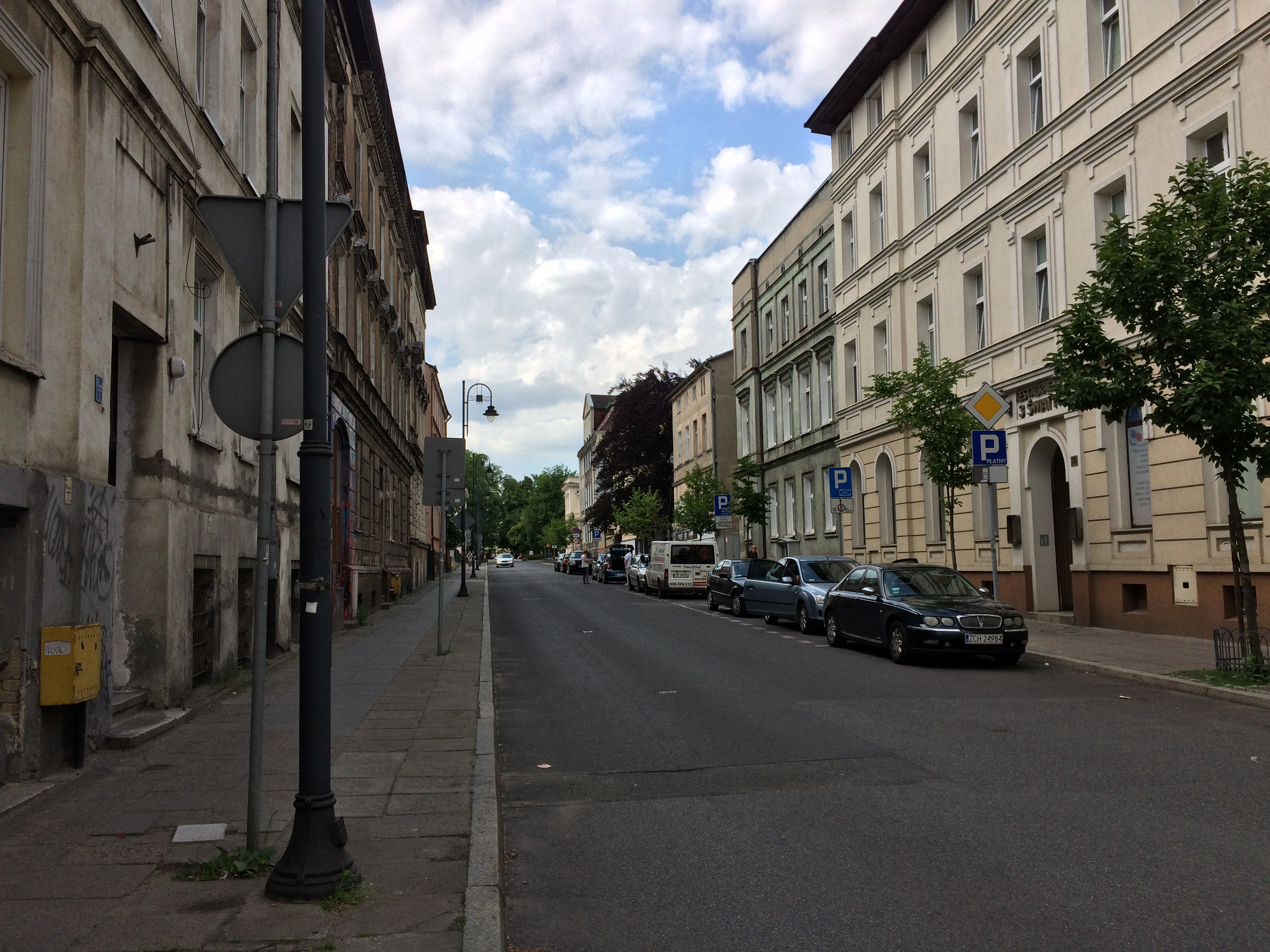
Street view with facade at Nr.13 on the right

=== Tenement at 14, corner with 3 Maja street ===
1870s

Eclecticism & Neo-Renaissance

This tenement at then Hoffmann straße 7 has been designed as a renting house by the landlord, Karl Roßoll, living at nearby Hempel straße (now 3 Maja street). From 1927 to 1938, the premises housed the Municipal Institute of Music (Polish: Miejski Instytut Muzyczny), before it moved to 71 Gdańska Street.

The tenement is unfortunately in bad shape.

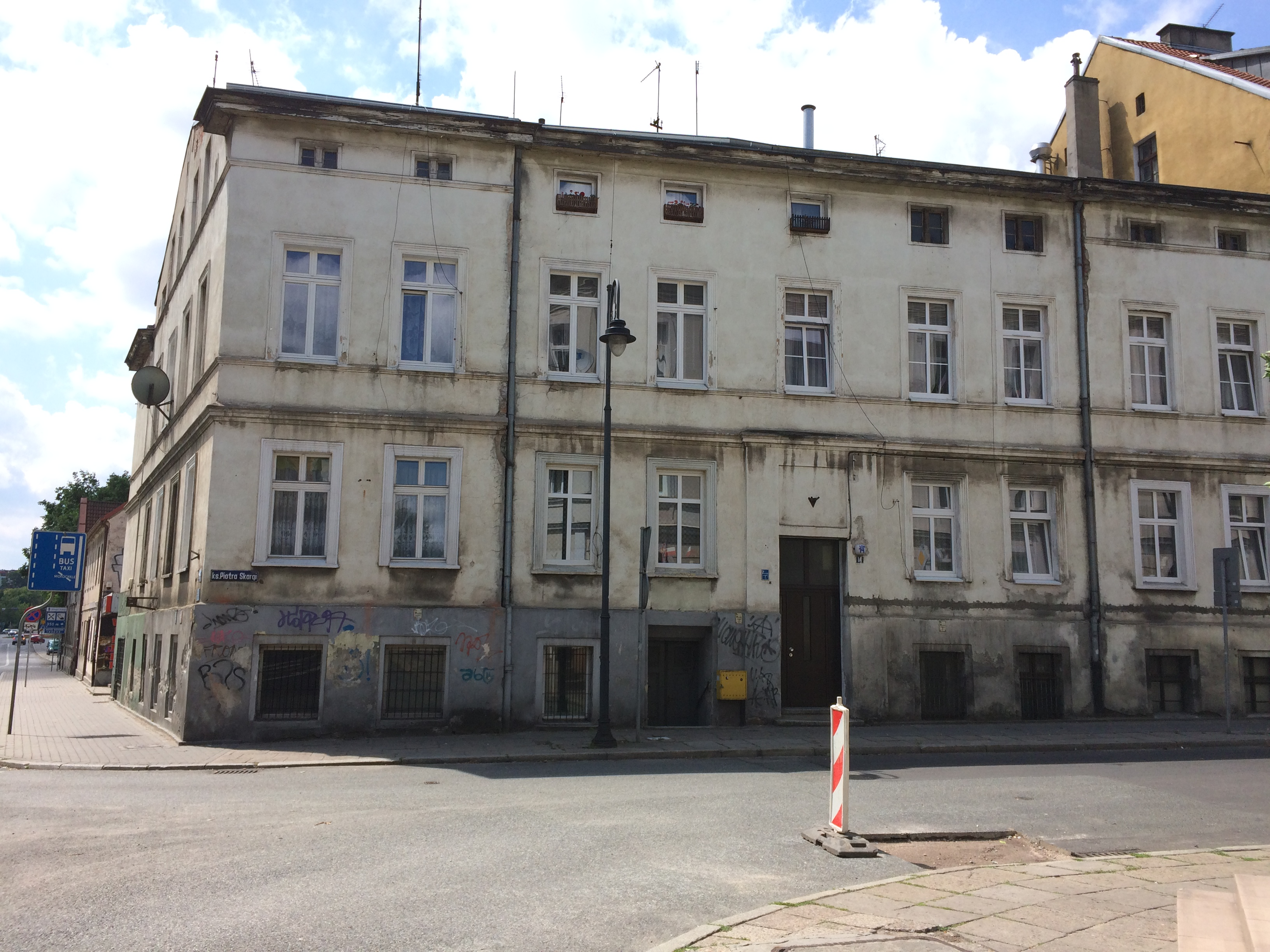
Corner view

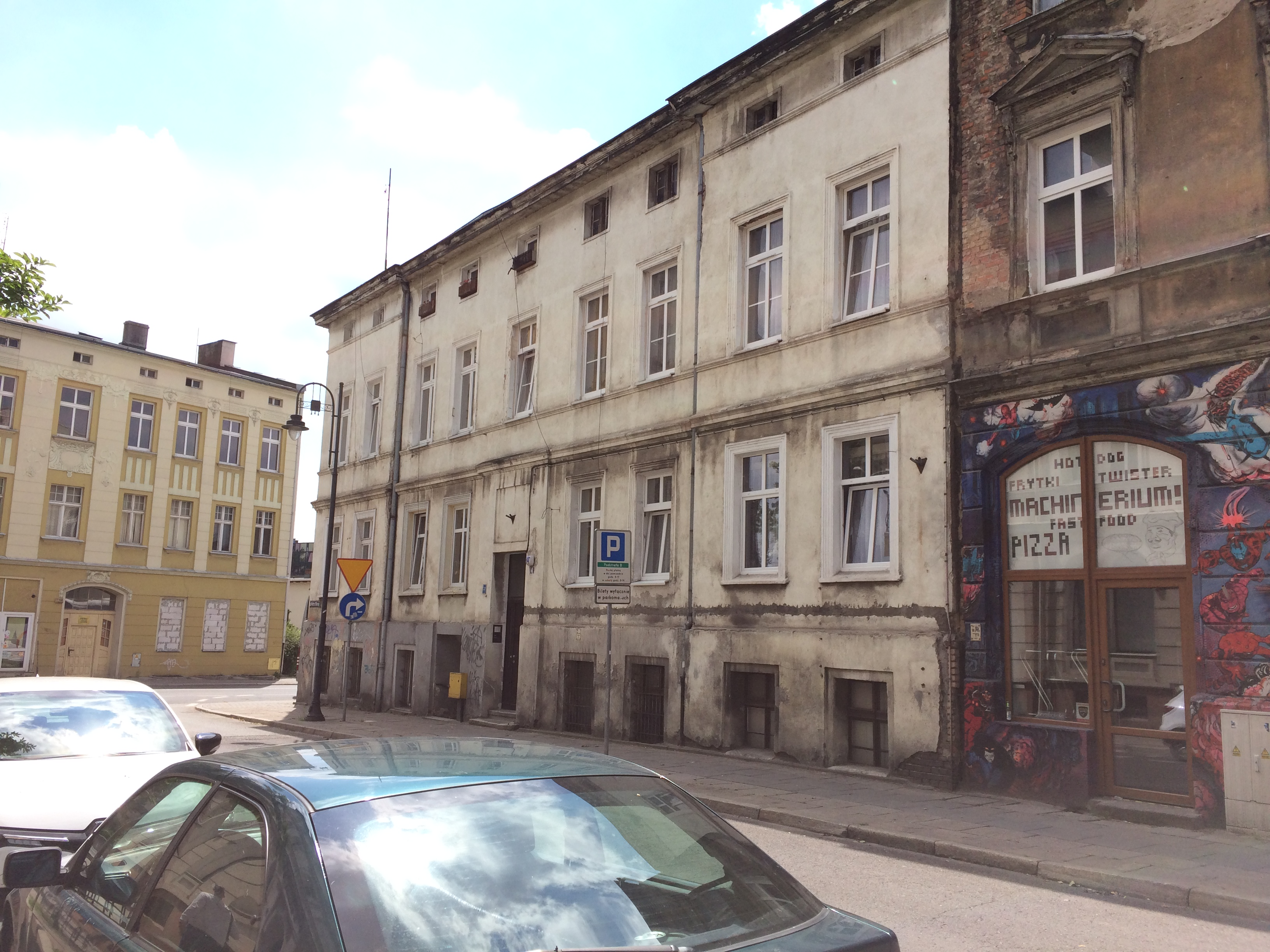
View of the facade on Piotra Skargi street

== See also ==
- Bydgoszcz
- Józef Swiecicki
- L. Braille special educational centre for blind children in Bydgoszcz
- Music Schools Group in Bydgoszcz

== Bibliography ==
  - (in Polish) Umiński, Janusz (1996). Bydgoszcz, Przewodnik. Bydgoszcz: Regionalny Oddział PTTK "Szlak Brdy".
- (in Polish) Denisuk, Andrzej (1990). Z działalności Towarzystwa Muzycznego w Bydgoszczy. Kronika Bydgoska X. Bydgoszcz: Towarzystwo Miłosnikow Miasta Bydgoszczy - Bydgoskie Towarzystwo Naukowe. pp. 205–212.
- (in Polish) Pruss Zdzisław, Weber Alicja, Kuczma Rajmund (2004). Bydgoski leksykon muzyczny. Bydgoszcz: Kujawsko-Pomorskie Towarzystwo Kulturalne.
- (in Polish) Przecherko, Tadeusz (2003). Osiemdziesiąt lat minęło... Kalendarz Bydgoski. Bydgoszcz: Towarzystwo Miłośników Miasta Bydgoszczy.
