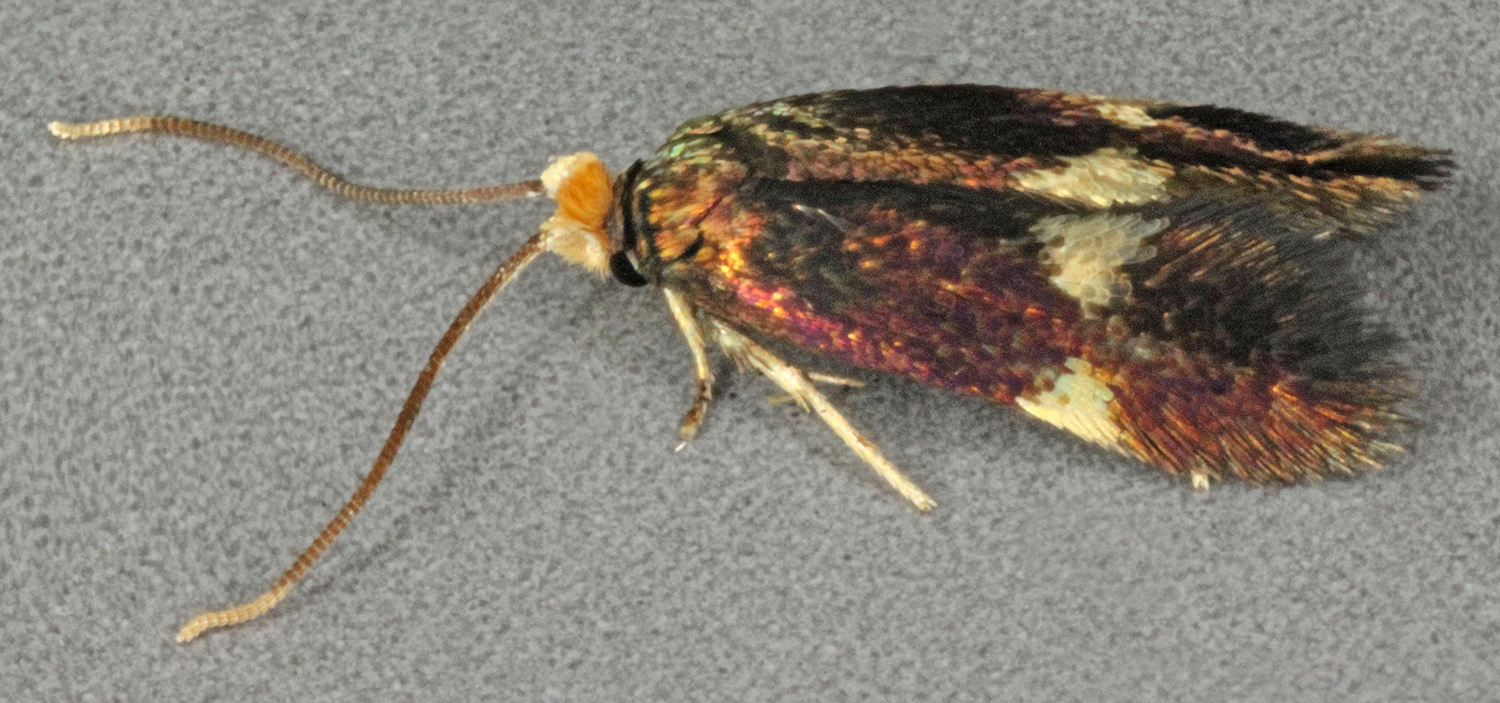
- Bohemannia quadrimaculella

Scientific classification
- Domain: Eukaryota
- Kingdom: Animalia
- Phylum: Arthropoda
- Class: Insecta
- Order: Lepidoptera
- Family: Nepticulidae
- Subfamily: Nepticulinae
- Genus: Bohemannia; Stainton, 1859

Synonyms
- Scoliaula Meyrick 1895

= Bohemannia =

Genus of moths

Bohemannia is a genus of moths of the family Nepticulidae.

== Species ==
- Bohemannia auriciliella (de Joannis, 1908)
- Bohemannia manschurella Puplesis, 1984
- Bohemannia nipponicella Hirano, 2010
- Bohemannia nubila Puplesis, 1985
- Bohemannia piotra Puplesis, 1984
- Bohemannia pulverosella (Stainton, 1849)
- Bohemannia quadrimaculella (Boheman, 1853)
- Bohemannia suiphunella Puplesis, 1984
- Bohemannia ussuriella Puplesis, 1984
