= Bohemannia pulverosella =

Scientific classification
- Kingdom: Animalia
- Phylum: Arthropoda
- Class: Insecta
- Order: Lepidoptera
- Family: Nepticulidae
- Genus: Bohemannia
- Species: B. pulverosella

Binomial name
- Bohemannia pulverosella (Stainton, 1849)

Synonyms
- Trifurcula pulverosella Stainton, 1849; Stigmella pulverosella; Nepticula cineretella

Species of moth

Bohemannia pulverosella is a moth of the family Nepticulidae. It is found from Fennoscandia to the Iberian Peninsula, the Alps, Slovenia and Bulgaria and from Ireland to central Russia and Ukraine.

Adults have a yellow head. The wings are ochreous speckled black.Identification requires microscopic examination of the genitalia.

== Gallery ==
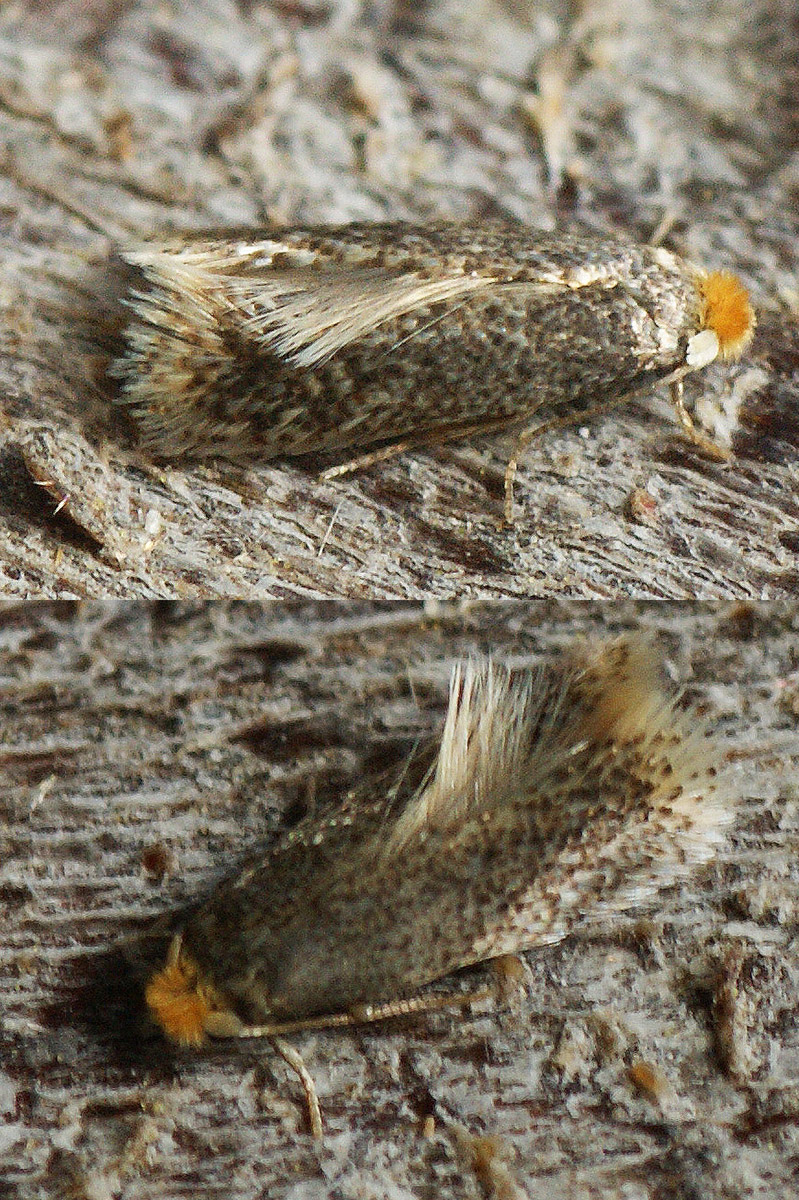

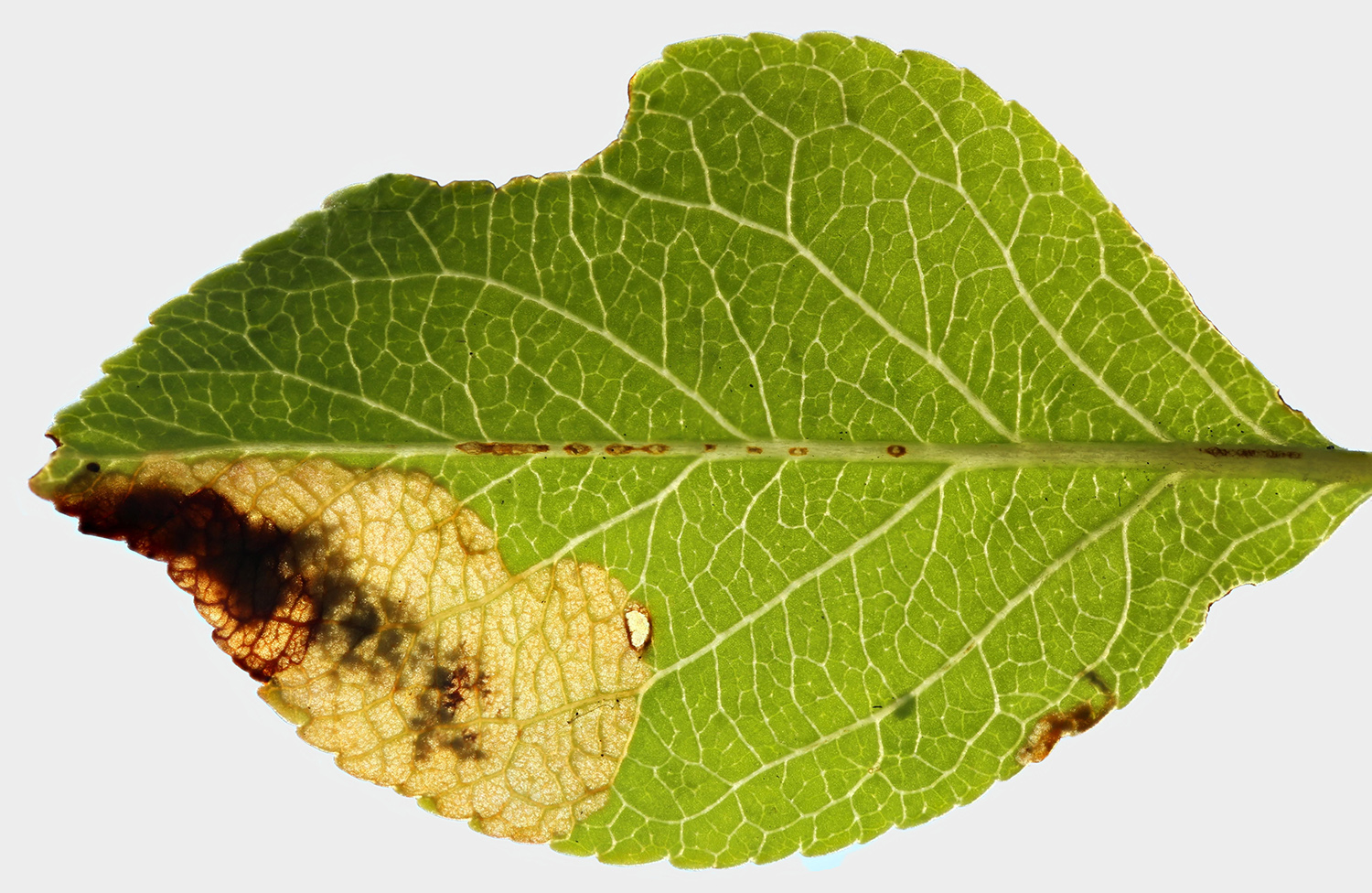
Bohemannia pulverosella mine
