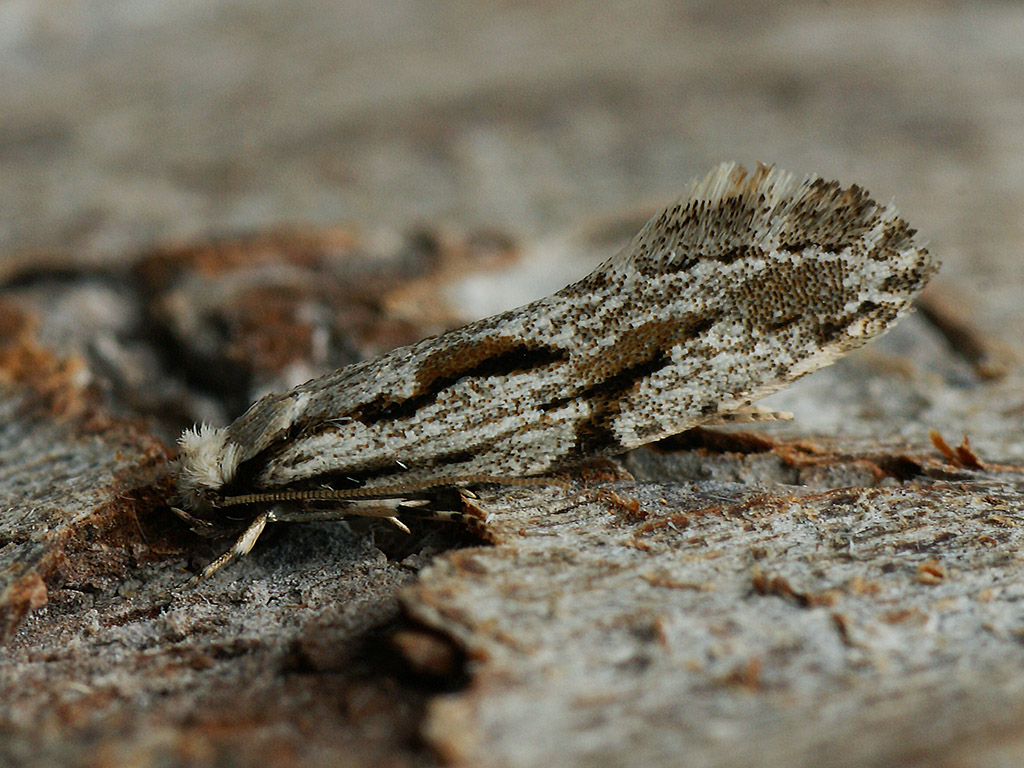

Scientific classification
- Kingdom: Animalia
- Phylum: Arthropoda
- Clade: Pancrustacea
- Class: Insecta
- Order: Lepidoptera
- Family: Tineidae
- Subfamily: Nemapogoninae
- Genus: Archinemapogon; Zagulajev, 1962

Type species
- "Tinea laterella" Thunberg, 1794 (non Denis & Schiffermüller, 1775: preoccupied)

Diversity
- 9 species

= Archinemapogon =

Genus of moths

Archinemapogon is a somewhat disputed genus of the fungus moth family, Tineidae. Within this group, it belongs to the subfamily Nemapogoninae. It is apparently an extremely close relative of the type genus of its subfamily, Nemapogon, and some authors include it there.

Its type species is called A. yildizae today, but that name was not established until 1981. Formerly, this moth was known as A. laterella – originally placed in Tinea – as well as T. picarella and A./T. arcuatella. The first name was established by C.P. Thunberg in 1794, and the latter two (junior synonyms, it was assumed) by J. Hübner in 1796 and H.T. Stainton in 1854, respectively. But all these names had been used before – J.N.C.M. Denis & I. Schiffermüller had described a T. laterella in 1775 (a concealer moth, now known as Agonopterix laterella), C.A. Clerck a T. picarella as early as 1759 (now Nemapogon picarella), and F. von P. Schrank a T. arcuatella in 1802 (probably a junior synonym of the arctiid moth Dysauxes ancilla). When this was discovered, a new name for the moth had to be found.

== Species ==
The nine species placed in Archinemapogon are:

- Archinemapogon assamensis Robinson, 1980
- Archinemapogon bacurianus Zagulajev, 1962
- Archinemapogon erasella (Zeller, 1863)
- Archinemapogon interstitiella (Dietz, 1905)
- Archinemapogon oregonella (Busck, 1901)
- Archinemapogon rileyi (Dietz, 1905) (= A. atriflua)
- Archinemapogon schromicus Zagulajev, 1964
- Archinemapogon ussuriensis Zagulajev, 1962
- Archinemapogon yildizae Koçak, 1981
