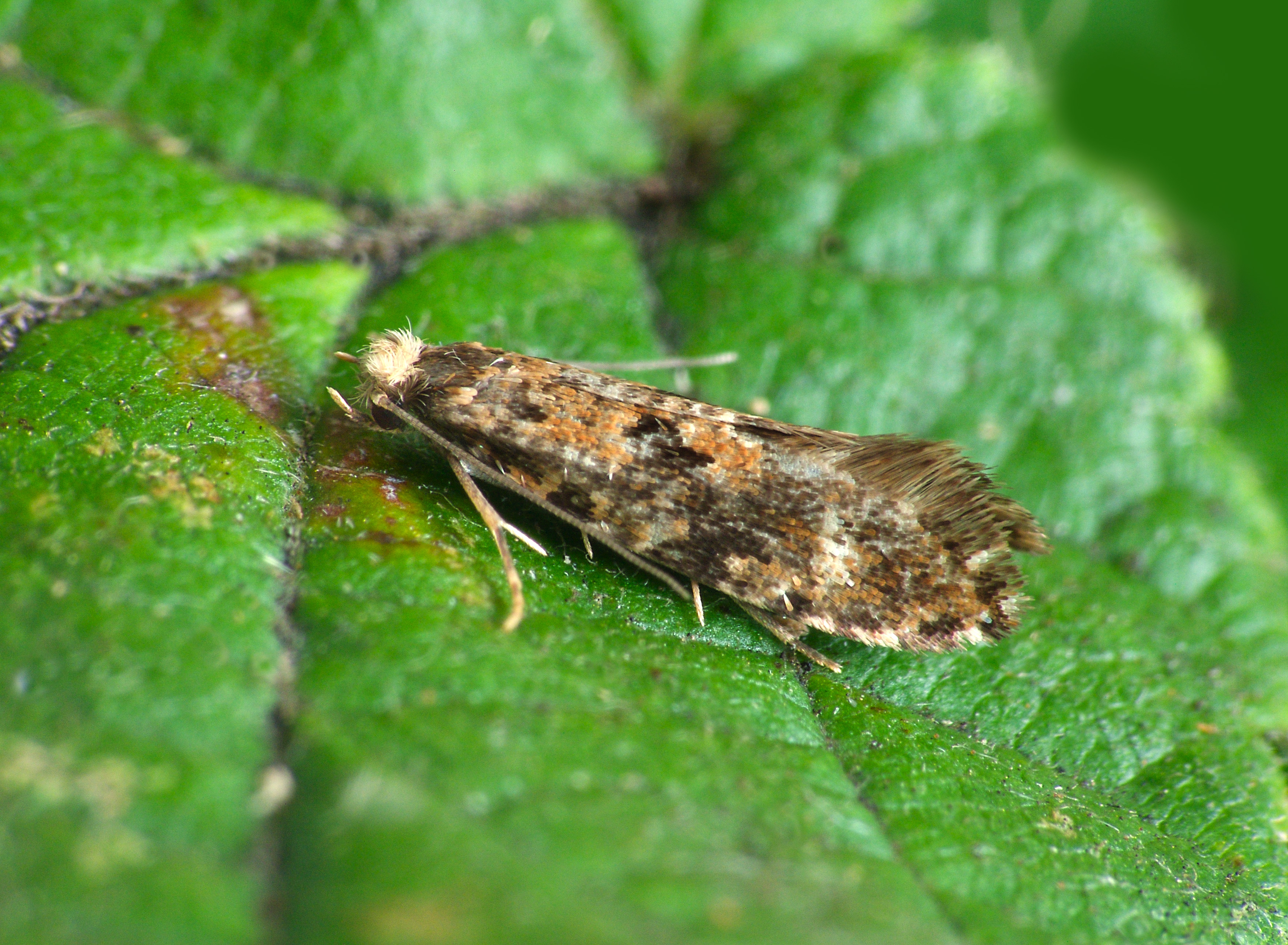

Scientific classification
- Kingdom: Animalia
- Phylum: Arthropoda
- Clade: Pancrustacea
- Class: Insecta
- Order: Lepidoptera
- Family: Tineidae
- Genus: Nemapogon
- Species: N. ruricolella

Binomial name
- Nemapogon ruricolella (Stainton, 1859)

Synonyms
- Tinea ruricolella Stainton, 1849; Tinea cochylidella Stainton, 1854

= Nemapogon ruricolella =

Species of moth

Nemapogon ruricolella, the gold-sheen clothes moth, is a moth of the family Tineidae. It is found in Great Britain, Spain, France, the Netherlands, Germany, Austria, Switzerland, Italy, the Czech Republic, Albania, Bulgaria, Romania, Moldova, Greece, Ukraine and Russia, as well as on Sardinia. The habitat consists of woodlands, heathlands and commons.

The wingspan is 10–14 mm. It is very similar to Nemapogon cloacella but has paler brown forewing markings.

Adults are on wing from late May to early August in one generation per year.

The larvae feed on bracket fungi, including Coriolus species, and dead wood.
