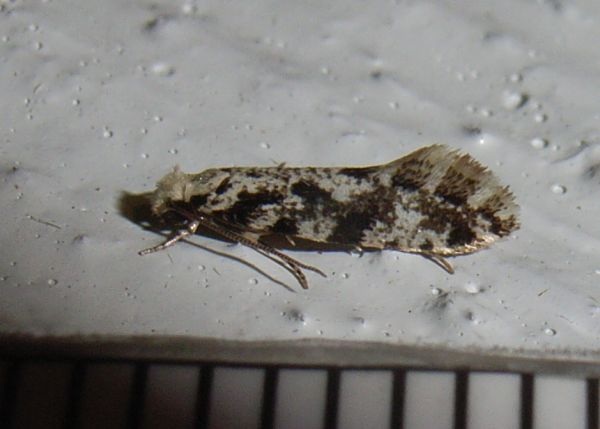

Scientific classification
- Kingdom: Animalia
- Phylum: Arthropoda
- Clade: Pancrustacea
- Class: Insecta
- Order: Lepidoptera
- Family: Tineidae
- Genus: Nemapogon
- Species: N. variatella

Binomial name
- Nemapogon variatella (Clemens, 1859)

Synonyms
- Many, see text

= Nemapogon variatella =

Species of moth

Nemapogon variatella is a moth of the family Tineidae. It is found in almost all of Europe. It is also found in North America.

The wingspan is about 12 mm.

The larvae feed on bracket fungus or dead wood, and possibly on dried grain or stored produce. Recorded food includes Coriolus versicolor, Laetiporus sulphureus and Polyporus squamosus.

== Synonyms ==
- Nemapogon apicisignatella (Dietz, 1905)
- Nemapogon fulvisuffusella (Dietz, 1905)
- Nemapogon personella (Pierce & Metcalfe, 1934)
- Nemapogon variatellus (lapsus)
- Tinea infimella Corbet, 1943 (non Herrich-Schäffer, 1851: preoccupied, name now refers to N. cloacella )
- Tinea personella Pierce & Metcalfe, 1934
- Tinea secalella Zacher, 1938
- Tinea variatella Clemens, 1859
