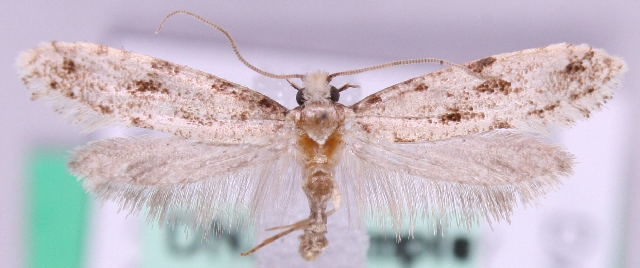

Scientific classification
- Kingdom: Animalia
- Phylum: Arthropoda
- Clade: Pancrustacea
- Class: Insecta
- Order: Lepidoptera
- Family: Tineidae
- Genus: Nemapogon
- Species: N. inconditella

Binomial name
- Nemapogon inconditella (Lucas, 1956)

Synonyms
- Tinea inconditella Lucas, 1956; Tinea buckwelli Lucas, 1956; Nemapogon buckwelli; Nemapogon heydeni G. Petersen, 1957; Nemapogon thomasi Capuse, 1975; Nemapogon hungaricus Capuse, 1968 (nec Gozmány, 1960)

= Nemapogon inconditella =

Species of moth

Nemapogon inconditella is a moth of the family Tineidae. It is found in most of Europe and North Africa, including Morocco.

The wingspan is 12–16 mm. Adults are similar to Nemapogon clematella. Both species have cream-white forewings, covered with light brown scales. However, inconditella has two spots at the base of the frontal margin. Furthermore, there is a dark spot in the middle.

The larvae feed on fungi, including Trametes versicolor.
