= Nemapogon fungivorella =

Scientific classification
- Kingdom: Animalia
- Phylum: Arthropoda
- Clade: Pancrustacea
- Class: Insecta
- Order: Lepidoptera
- Family: Tineidae
- Genus: Nemapogon
- Species: N. fungivorella

Binomial name
- Nemapogon fungivorella (Benander, 1939)

Synonyms
- Tinea fungivorella Benander, 1939

Species of moth

Nemapogon fungivorella is a moth of the family Tineidae. It is found in Denmark, Germany, Poland, Austria, the Czech Republic, Slovakia, Norway, Sweden, Finland, Estonia, Latvia, Ukraine and Russia.

The wingspan is 12–20 mm. Adults have been recorded on wing in January and from July to August.

The larvae feed on fungi growing on rotting wood, including Daedalea quercina.
