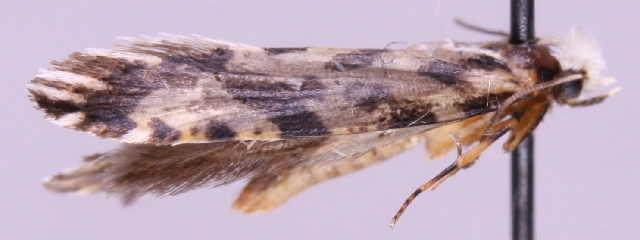

Scientific classification
- Kingdom: Animalia
- Phylum: Arthropoda
- Clade: Pancrustacea
- Class: Insecta
- Order: Lepidoptera
- Family: Tineidae
- Genus: Nemapogon
- Species: N. nigralbella

Binomial name
- Nemapogon nigralbella (Zeller, 1859)

Synonyms
- Tinea nigralbella Zeller, 1839; Nemapogon nigralbellus

= Nemapogon nigralbella =

Species of moth

Nemapogon nigralbella is a moth of the family Tineidae. It is found in Spain, France, Germany, Denmark, Austria, Switzerland, the Czech Republic, Slovakia, Poland, Croatia, Hungary, Bulgaria, Ukraine, Belarus, Moldova, the Baltic region, Finland, Sweden, Norway and Russia.

The wingspan is 12–17 mm. Adults are on wing from June to July.
