= Nemapogon reisseri =

Scientific classification
- Kingdom: Animalia
- Phylum: Arthropoda
- Clade: Pancrustacea
- Class: Insecta
- Order: Lepidoptera
- Family: Tineidae
- Genus: Nemapogon
- Species: N. reisseri

Binomial name
- Nemapogon reisseri Petersen & Gaedike, 1983

Species of moth

Nemapogon reisseri is a moth of the family Tineidae. It is found in mainland Greece and on Crete and the Dodecanese Islands.
