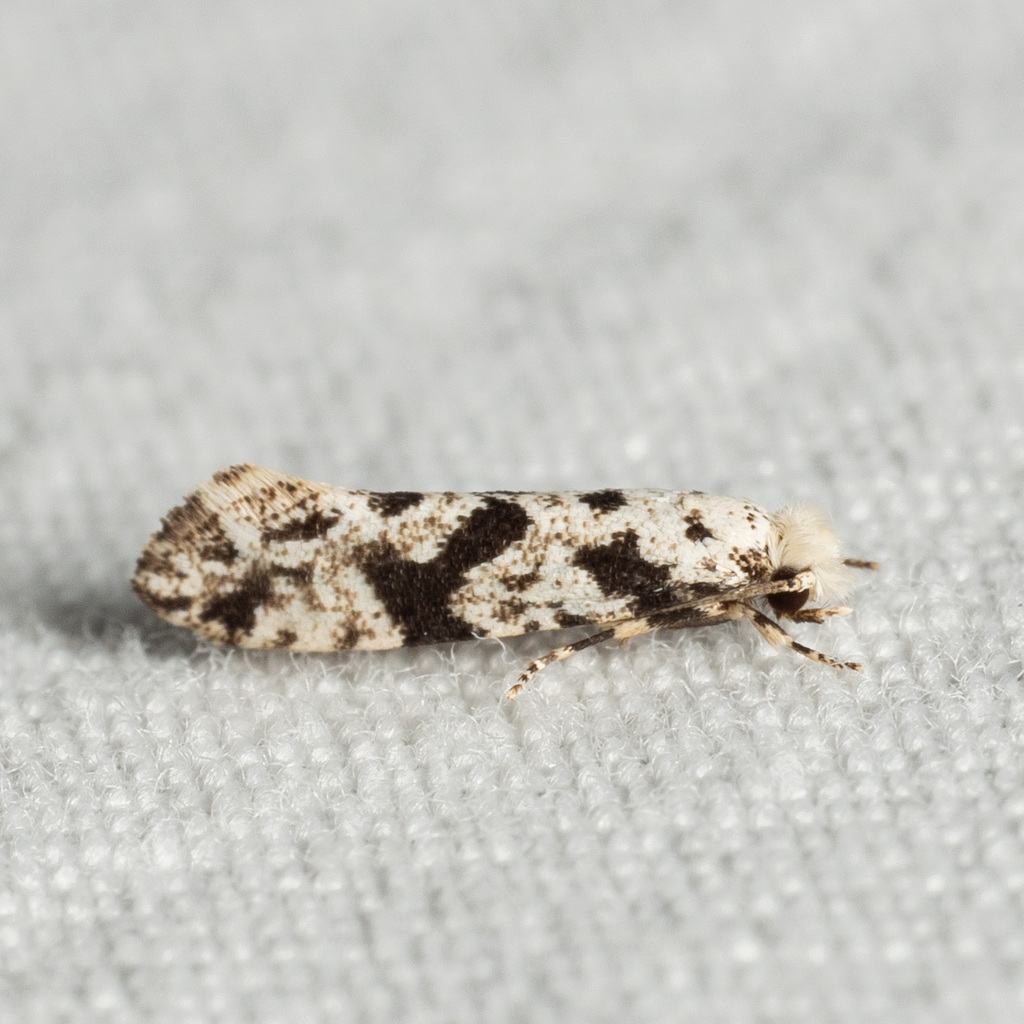

Scientific classification
- Kingdom: Animalia
- Phylum: Arthropoda
- Clade: Pancrustacea
- Class: Insecta
- Order: Lepidoptera
- Family: Tineidae
- Genus: Nemapogon
- Species: N. defectella

Binomial name
- Nemapogon defectella (Zeller, 1873)

Synonyms
- Tinea defectella Zeller, 1873

= Nemapogon defectella =

Species of moth

Nemapogon defectella is a moth of the family Tineidae. It is found in North America, where it has been recorded from Arizona, California, New Hampshire and West Virginia.
