= Nemapogon arcosuensis =

Scientific classification
- Kingdom: Animalia
- Phylum: Arthropoda
- Clade: Pancrustacea
- Class: Insecta
- Order: Lepidoptera
- Family: Tineidae
- Genus: Nemapogon
- Species: N. arcosuensis

Binomial name
- Nemapogon arcosuensis Gaedike, 2007

Species of moth

Nemapogon arcosuensis is a moth of the family Tineidae. It is found on Sardinia.

The wingspan is 12–14 mm. The forewings are white with a black pattern. The hindwings are grey.

== Etymology ==
The species is named for Oasi WWF Monte Arcosu, the collecting locality.
