= Nemapogon agnathosella =

Scientific classification
- Kingdom: Animalia
- Phylum: Arthropoda
- Clade: Pancrustacea
- Class: Insecta
- Order: Lepidoptera
- Family: Tineidae
- Genus: Nemapogon
- Species: N. agnathosella

Binomial name
- Nemapogon agnathosella Gaedike, 2000

Species of insect

Nemapogon agnathosella is a moth of the family Tineidae. It is found in the Russian Far East.
