= Nemapogon hispanica =

Scientific classification
- Kingdom: Animalia
- Phylum: Arthropoda
- Clade: Pancrustacea
- Class: Insecta
- Order: Lepidoptera
- Family: Tineidae
- Genus: Nemapogon
- Species: N. hispanica

Binomial name
- Nemapogon hispanica Petersen & Gaedike, 1992

Species of moth

Nemapogon hispanica is a moth of the family Tineidae. It is found in Spain.
