= Nemapogon signatella =

Scientific classification
- Kingdom: Animalia
- Phylum: Arthropoda
- Clade: Pancrustacea
- Class: Insecta
- Order: Lepidoptera
- Family: Tineidae
- Genus: Nemapogon
- Species: N. signatella

Binomial name
- Nemapogon signatella Petersen, 1957

Synonyms
- Nemapogon signatellus

Species of moth

Nemapogon signatella is a moth of the family Tineidae. It is found from Italy to the Balkan Peninsula and on Cyprus, as well as in Turkey, Jordan and Iran.
