= Nemapogon teberdellus =

Scientific classification
- Kingdom: Animalia
- Phylum: Arthropoda
- Clade: Pancrustacea
- Class: Insecta
- Order: Lepidoptera
- Family: Tineidae
- Genus: Nemapogon
- Species: N. teberdellus

Binomial name
- Nemapogon teberdellus (Zagulajev, 1963)

Synonyms
- Anemapogon teberdellus Zagulajev, 1963; Nemapogon teberdensis; Anemapogon georgiellus Zagulajev, 1963; Nemapogon georgicus

Species of moth

Nemapogon teberdellus is a moth of the family Tineidae. It is found in the Caucasus and Turkey.
