= Nemapogon bachmarensis =

Scientific classification
- Kingdom: Animalia
- Phylum: Arthropoda
- Clade: Pancrustacea
- Class: Insecta
- Order: Lepidoptera
- Family: Tineidae
- Genus: Nemapogon
- Species: N. bachmarensis

Binomial name
- Nemapogon bachmarensis Zagulajev, 1964

Species of moth

Nemapogon bachmarensis is a moth of the family Tineidae. It is found in the Caucasus.
