= Nemapogon lagodechiellus =

Scientific classification
- Kingdom: Animalia
- Phylum: Arthropoda
- Clade: Pancrustacea
- Class: Insecta
- Order: Lepidoptera
- Family: Tineidae
- Genus: Nemapogon
- Species: N. lagodechiellus

Binomial name
- Nemapogon lagodechiellus Zagulajev, 1962

Species of moth

Nemapogon lagodechiellus is a moth of the family Tineidae. It is found in the Caucasus.
