= Nemapogon meridionella =

Scientific classification
- Kingdom: Animalia
- Phylum: Arthropoda
- Clade: Pancrustacea
- Class: Insecta
- Order: Lepidoptera
- Family: Tineidae
- Genus: Nemapogon
- Species: N. meridionella

Binomial name
- Nemapogon meridionella (Zagulajev, 1962)

Synonyms
- Petalographis meridionella Zagulajev, 1962; Nemapogon meridionalis

Species of moth

Nemapogon meridionella is a moth of the family Tineidae. It is found in Ukraine.
