= Nemapogon fuscalbella =

Scientific classification
- Kingdom: Animalia
- Phylum: Arthropoda
- Clade: Pancrustacea
- Class: Insecta
- Order: Lepidoptera
- Family: Tineidae
- Genus: Nemapogon
- Species: N. fuscalbella

Binomial name
- Nemapogon fuscalbella (Chrétien, 1908)

Synonyms
- Tinea fuscalbella Chrétien, 1908

Species of moth

Nemapogon fuscalbella is a moth of the family Tineidae. It is found in France.
