= Nemapogon orientalis =

Scientific classification
- Kingdom: Animalia
- Phylum: Arthropoda
- Clade: Pancrustacea
- Class: Insecta
- Order: Lepidoptera
- Family: Tineidae
- Genus: Nemapogon
- Species: N. orientalis

Binomial name
- Nemapogon orientalis Petersen, 1961

Species of moth

Nemapogon orientalis is a moth of the family Tineidae. It is found and Lebanon, Russia, Ukraine, as well as on Cyprus, Crete and the North Aegean islands.
