= Nemapogon gravosaellus =

Scientific classification
- Kingdom: Animalia
- Phylum: Arthropoda
- Clade: Pancrustacea
- Class: Insecta
- Order: Lepidoptera
- Family: Tineidae
- Genus: Nemapogon
- Species: N. gravosaellus

Binomial name
- Nemapogon gravosaellus Petersen, 1957

Synonyms
- Nemapogon borshomi Zagulajev, 1964

Species of moth

Nemapogon gravosaellus is a moth of the family Tineidae. It is found in Austria, the Czech Republic, Slovakia, Italy, Croatia, Serbia, Romania, Bulgaria, Hungary, North Macedonia, Greece and Ukraine, as well as on Sardinia, Sicily, the Dodecanese Islands and Crete.

The wingspan is about 12 mm.
