= Nemapogon hungaricus =

Scientific classification
- Kingdom: Animalia
- Phylum: Arthropoda
- Clade: Pancrustacea
- Class: Insecta
- Order: Lepidoptera
- Family: Tineidae
- Genus: Nemapogon
- Species: N. hungaricus

Binomial name
- Nemapogon hungaricus Gozmány, 1960

Synonyms
- Nemapogon pliginskii Zagulajev, 1963

Species of moth

Nemapogon hungaricus is a moth of the family Tineidae. It is found in Italy, Croatia, Slovakia, Bulgaria, Romania, Hungary, North Macedonia, Greece, Ukraine, Russia, and on Sardinia.
