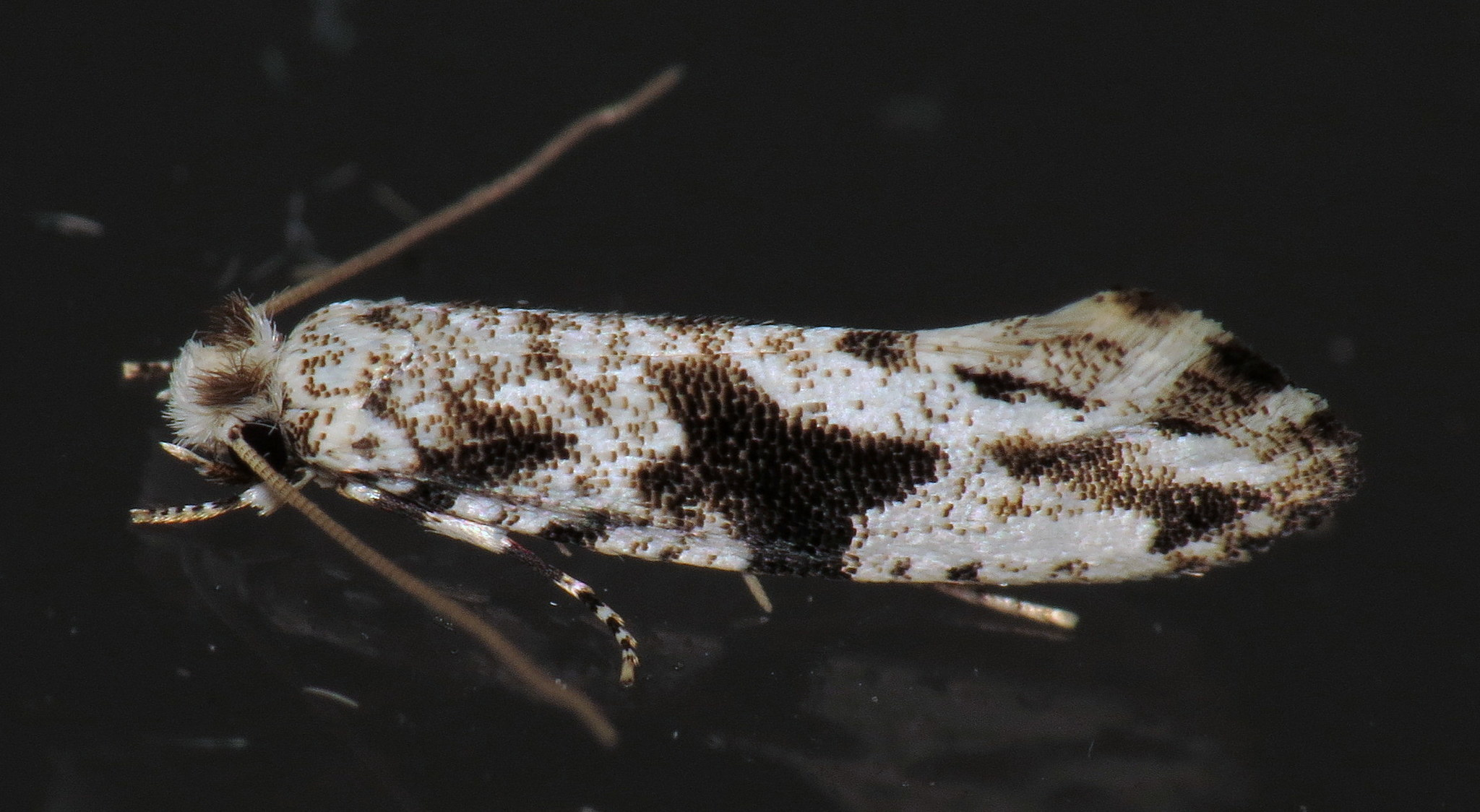
- Nemapogon angulifasciella, Massachusetts

Scientific classification
- Kingdom: Animalia
- Phylum: Arthropoda
- Clade: Pancrustacea
- Class: Insecta
- Order: Lepidoptera
- Family: Tineidae
- Genus: Nemapogon
- Species: N. angulifasciella

Binomial name
- Nemapogon angulifasciella (Dietz, 1905)

Synonyms
- Tinea angulifasciella Dietz, 1905

= Nemapogon angulifasciella =

Species of moth

Nemapogon angulifasciella is a moth of the family Tineidae. It is found in North America, where it has been recorded from Alabama, Illinois, Indiana, Louisiana, Maine, Maryland, Massachusetts, Mississippi, North Carolina, South Carolina, Tennessee and West Virginia.

The wingspan is about 12 mm. Adults have been recorded on wing from April to October.
