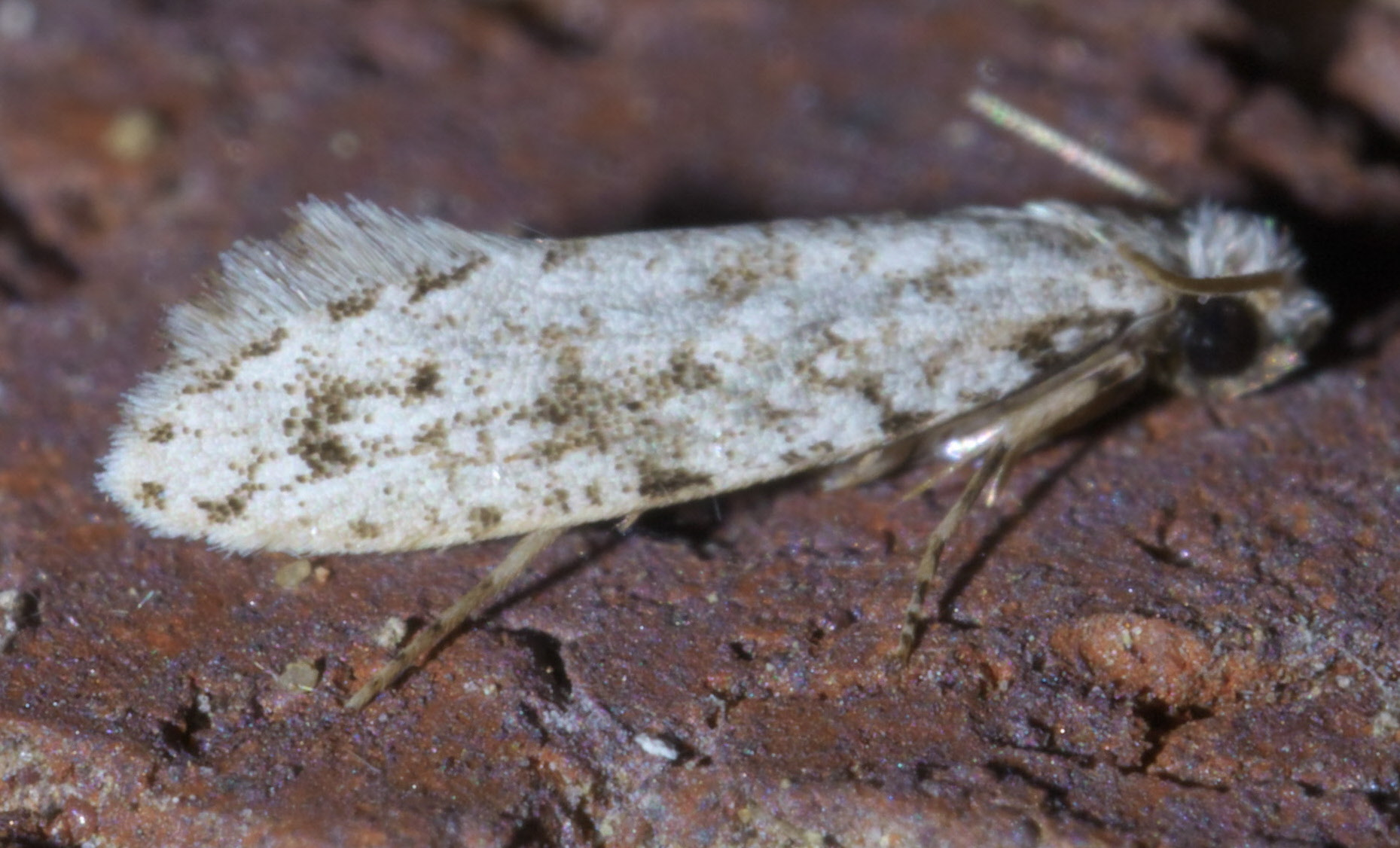

Scientific classification
- Kingdom: Animalia
- Phylum: Arthropoda
- Clade: Pancrustacea
- Class: Insecta
- Order: Lepidoptera
- Family: Tineidae
- Genus: Nemapogon
- Species: N. acapnopennella

Binomial name
- Nemapogon acapnopennella (Clement, 1863)

Synonyms
- Tinea acapnopennella Clemens, 1863; Tinea minutipulvella Chambers, 1875; Nemapogon minutipulnella

= Nemapogon acapnopennella =

Species of moth

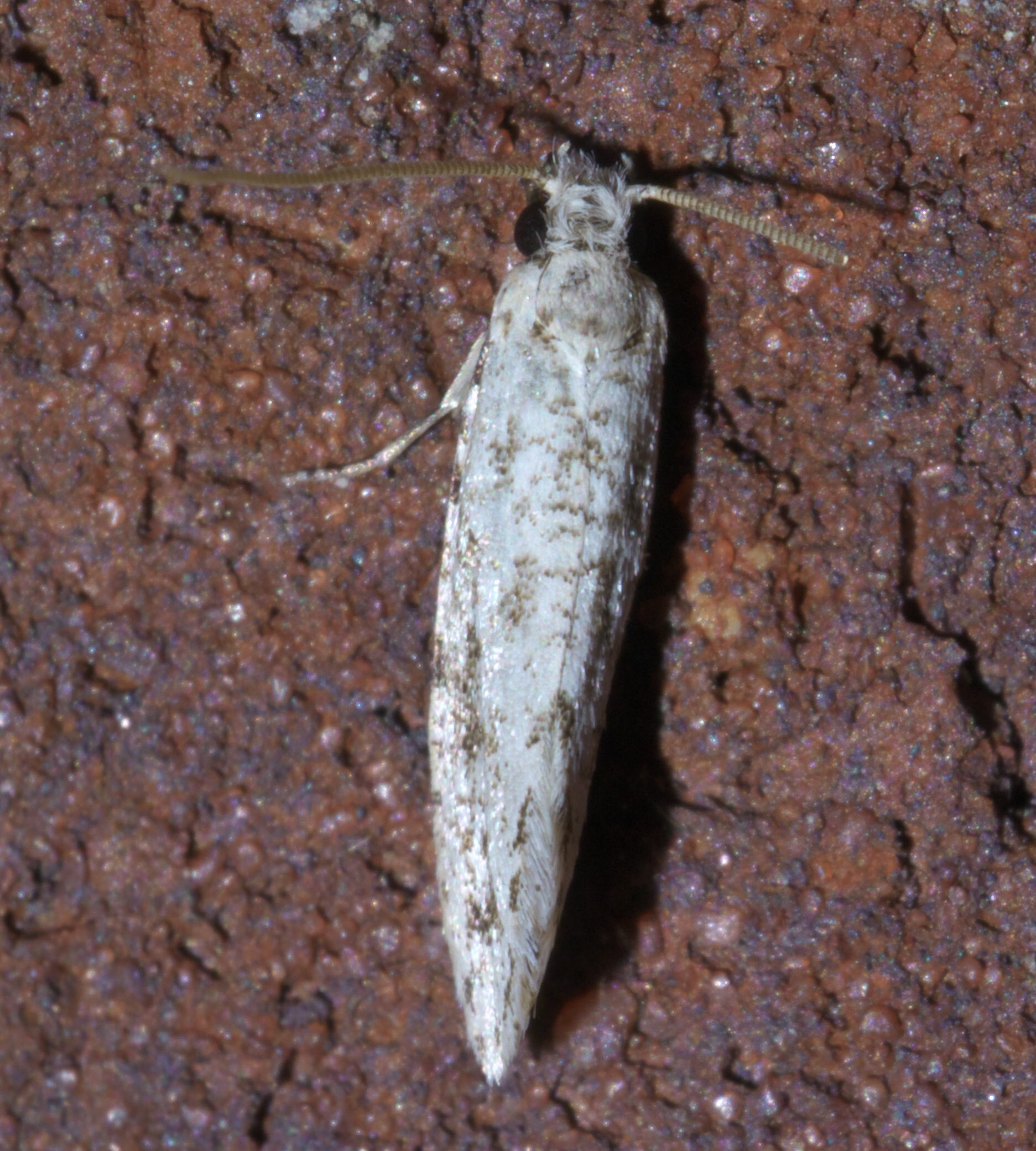
Nemapogon acapnopennella, size: 6.3 mm

Nemapogon acapnopennella is a moth of the family Tineidae. It is found in North America, where it has been recorded from Arkansas, British Columbia, the District of Columbia, Florida, Illinois, Indiana, Maine, Maryland, Mississippi, Ohio, Oklahoma, Ontario, Quebec, South Carolina, Tennessee and Texas.

The wingspan is about 9 mm. Adults have been recorded on wing from February to November.
