= Nemapogon diarthrota =

Scientific classification
- Kingdom: Animalia
- Phylum: Arthropoda
- Clade: Pancrustacea
- Class: Insecta
- Order: Lepidoptera
- Family: Tineidae
- Genus: Nemapogon
- Species: N. diarthrota

Binomial name
- Nemapogon diarthrota (Meyrick, 1936)

Synonyms
- Tinea diarthrota Meyrick, 1936

Species of moth

Nemapogon diarthrota is a moth of the family Tineidae. It is found in India.
