= Nemapogon kashmirensis =

Scientific classification
- Kingdom: Animalia
- Phylum: Arthropoda
- Clade: Pancrustacea
- Class: Insecta
- Order: Lepidoptera
- Family: Tineidae
- Genus: Nemapogon
- Species: N. kashmirensis

Binomial name
- Nemapogon kashmirensis Robinson, 1980

Species of moth

Nemapogon kashmirensis is a moth of the family Tineidae. It is found in Kashmir.
