= Nemapogon asyntacta =

Scientific classification
- Kingdom: Animalia
- Phylum: Arthropoda
- Clade: Pancrustacea
- Class: Insecta
- Order: Lepidoptera
- Family: Tineidae
- Genus: Nemapogon
- Species: N. asyntacta

Binomial name
- Nemapogon asyntacta (Meyrick, 1917)

Synonyms
- Tinea asyntacta Meyrick, 1917

Species of moth

Nemapogon asyntacta is a moth of the family Tineidae. It is found in India.
