= Nemapogon flavifrons =

Scientific classification
- Kingdom: Animalia
- Phylum: Arthropoda
- Clade: Pancrustacea
- Class: Insecta
- Order: Lepidoptera
- Family: Tineidae
- Genus: Nemapogon
- Species: N. flavifrons

Binomial name
- Nemapogon flavifrons Petersen, 1959

Synonyms
- Nemapogon kabulianus Gozmány, 1959

Species of moth

Nemapogon flavifrons is a moth of the family Tineidae. It is found in Afghanistan.
