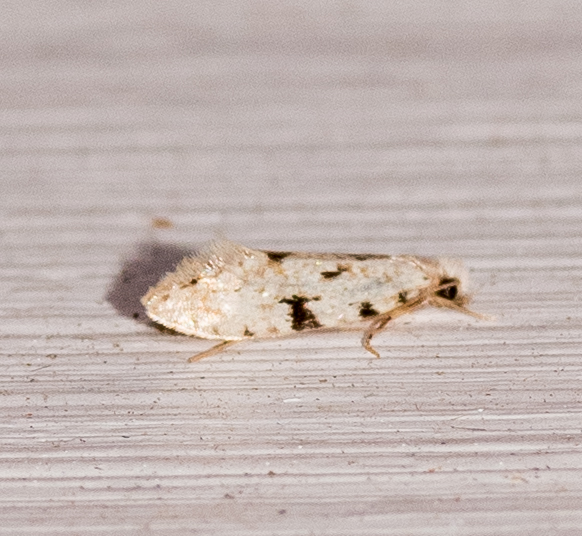

Scientific classification
- Kingdom: Animalia
- Phylum: Arthropoda
- Clade: Pancrustacea
- Class: Insecta
- Order: Lepidoptera
- Family: Tineidae
- Genus: Nemapogon
- Species: N. tylodes

Binomial name
- Nemapogon tylodes (Meyrick, 1919)

Synonyms
- Tinea tylodes Meyrick, 1919

= Nemapogon tylodes =

Species of moth

Nemapogon tylodes is a moth of the family Tineidae. It is found in North America, where it has been recorded from Alberta, British Columbia, Maine, Massachusetts, New Hampshire, Ontario, Quebec and West Virginia.
