= Archinemapogon ussuriensis =

Scientific classification
- Kingdom: Animalia
- Phylum: Arthropoda
- Class: Insecta
- Order: Lepidoptera
- Family: Tineidae
- Genus: Archinemapogon
- Species: A. ussuriensis

Binomial name
- Archinemapogon ussuriensis Zagulajev, 1962

Species of moth

Archinemapogon ussuriensis is a moth of the family Tineidae. It found in the Russian Far East.
