= Nemapogon echinata =

Scientific classification
- Kingdom: Animalia
- Phylum: Arthropoda
- Clade: Pancrustacea
- Class: Insecta
- Order: Lepidoptera
- Family: Tineidae
- Genus: Nemapogon
- Species: N. echinata

Binomial name
- Nemapogon echinata Gaedike, 2000

Species of moth

Nemapogon echinata is a moth of the family Tineidae. It is found in the Russian Far East (Primorskij kraj).
