= Nemapogon gliriella =

Scientific classification
- Kingdom: Animalia
- Phylum: Arthropoda
- Clade: Pancrustacea
- Class: Insecta
- Order: Lepidoptera
- Family: Tineidae
- Genus: Nemapogon
- Species: N. gliriella

Binomial name
- Nemapogon gliriella (Heyden, 1865)

Synonyms
- Tinea gliriella Heyden, 1865; Anemapogon cachetiellus Zagulajev, 1963; Nemapogon cacheticus; Longiductus ibericus Zagulajev, 1968; Nemapogon ibericus

Species of moth

Nemapogon gliriella is a moth of the family Tineidae. It is found in Germany, Austria, the Czech Republic, Slovakia, Russia and Georgia.

The wingspan is 12–17 mm.

The larvae feed on fungus species, including Stereum hirsutum.
