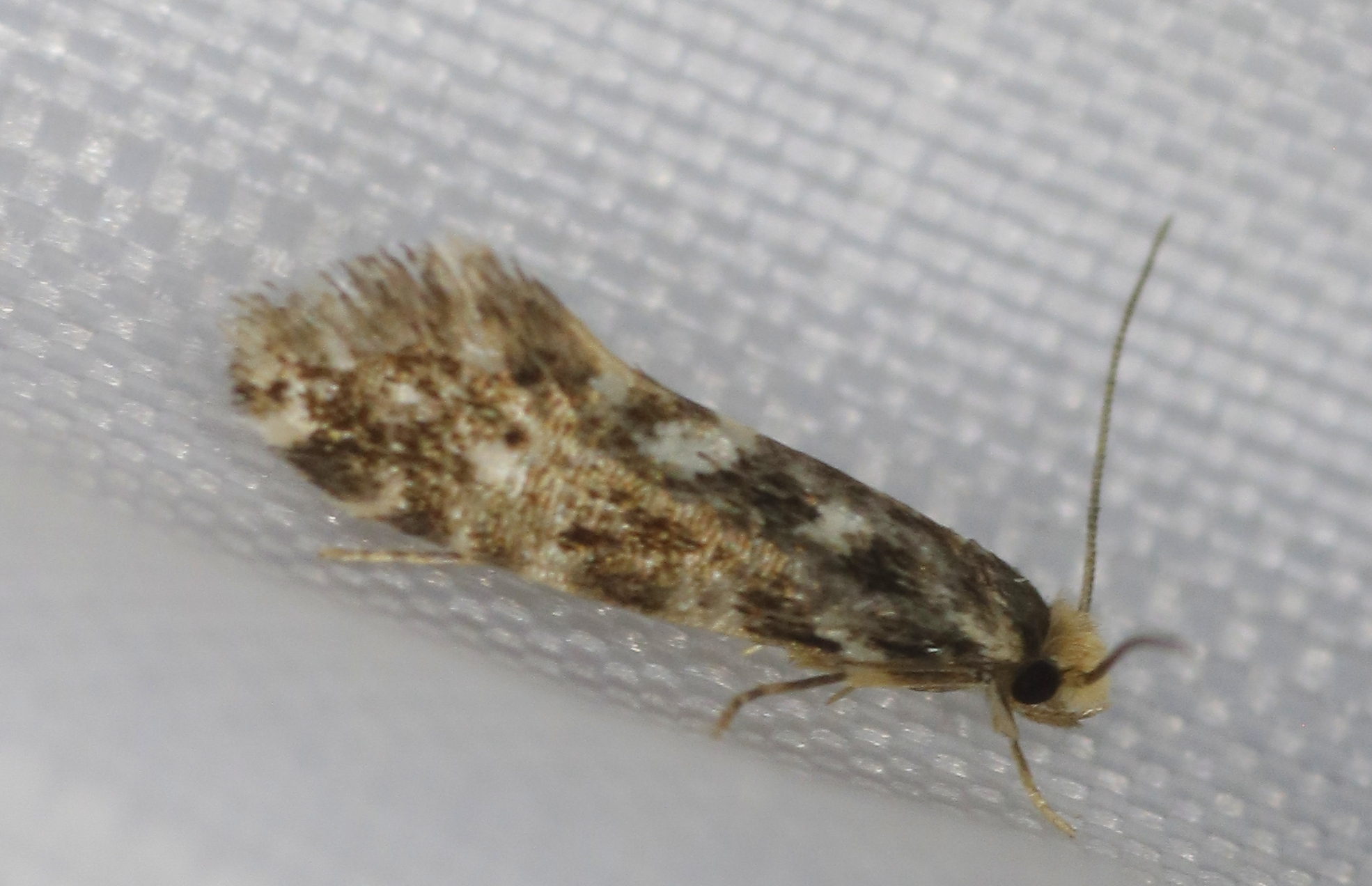

Scientific classification
- Kingdom: Animalia
- Phylum: Arthropoda
- Clade: Pancrustacea
- Class: Insecta
- Order: Lepidoptera
- Family: Tineidae
- Genus: Nemapogon
- Species: N. ophrionella

Binomial name
- Nemapogon ophrionella (Dietz, 1905)

Synonyms
- Tinea ophrionella Dietz, 1905

= Nemapogon ophrionella =

Species of moth

Nemapogon ophrionella is a species of moth in the family Tineidae. It is found in North America, where it has been recorded from Maine, Quebec and Texas.
