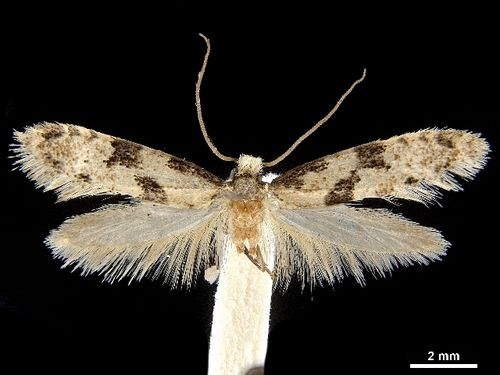

Scientific classification
- Kingdom: Animalia
- Phylum: Arthropoda
- Clade: Pancrustacea
- Class: Insecta
- Order: Lepidoptera
- Family: Tineidae
- Genus: Nemapogon
- Species: N. geniculatella

Binomial name
- Nemapogon geniculatella (Dietz, 1905)

Synonyms
- Tinea geniculatella Dietz, 1905

= Nemapogon geniculatella =

Species of moth

Nemapogon geniculatella is a moth of the family Tineidae. It is found in North America, where it has been recorded from California, Oregon, Montana, and Utah.
