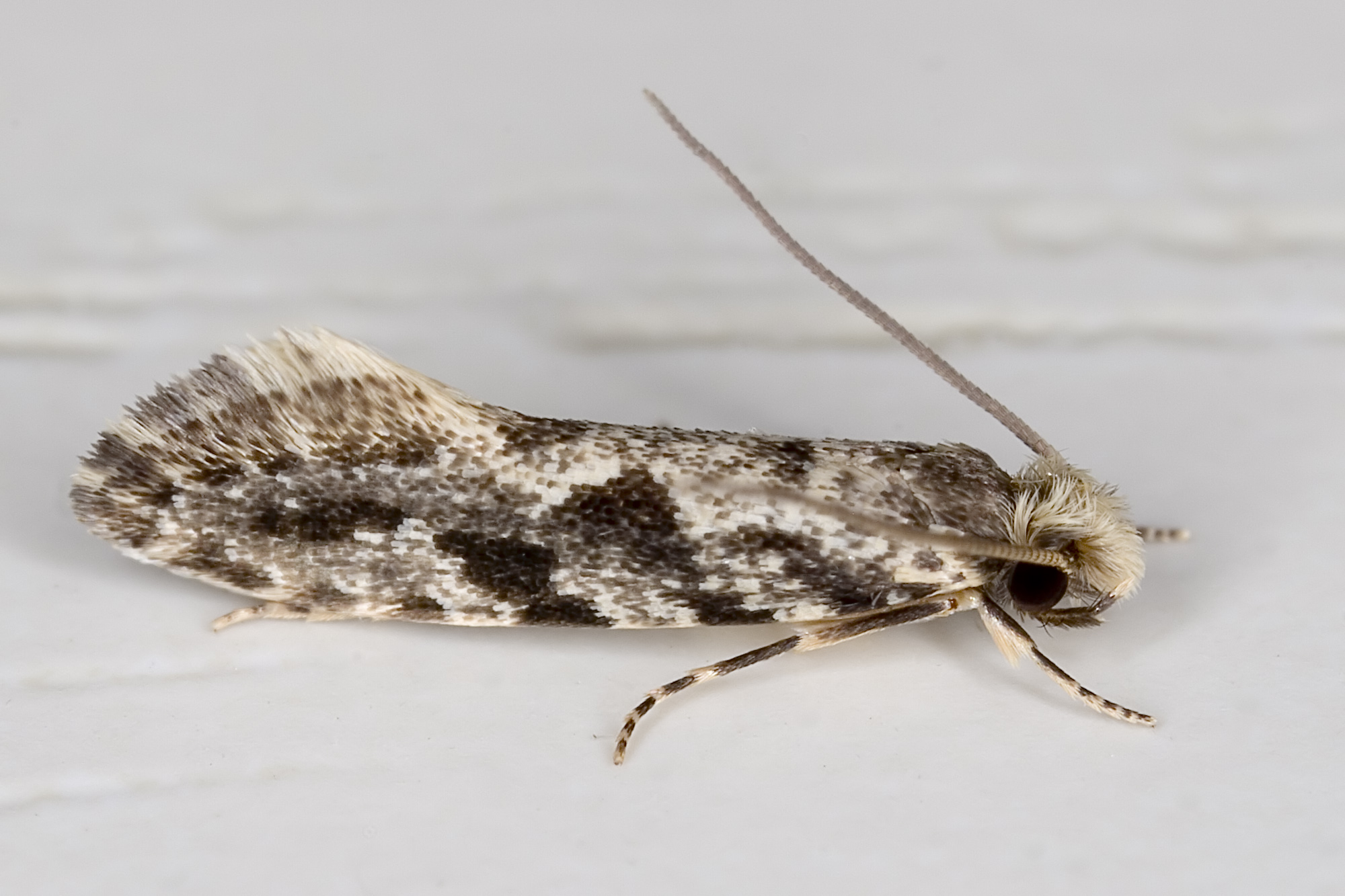
- Adult from Dresden (Germany)

Scientific classification
- Kingdom: Animalia
- Phylum: Arthropoda
- Clade: Pancrustacea
- Class: Insecta
- Order: Lepidoptera
- Family: Tineidae
- Genus: Nemapogon
- Species: N. granella

Binomial name
- Nemapogon granella (Linnaeus, 1758)

Synonyms
- Numerous, see text

= Nemapogon granella =

European grain moth

Species of moth

Nemapogon granella (European grain worm or European grain moth) is a species of tineoid moth. It belongs to the fungus moth family (Tineidae), and therein to the subfamily Nemapogoninae. It is the type species of its genus Nemapogon, and via that also of the subfamily Nemapogoninae. It is also the type species of the proposed genera Brosis (as established by J. Hübner, a junior homonym and thus invalid) and Diaphthirusa, which are consequently junior objective synonyms of Nemapogon.

== Ecology and description ==
This moth ranges widely across the western Palearctic. However, even in its native range its distribution is somewhat patchy; in the UK for example, it is widespread, but may still be locally absent. It has not been recorded from France and Slovenia, but this may simply be due to its being overlooked or confused with similar species than being genuinely absent, as it is found in the neighboring countries. Its apparent absence from Iceland, on the other hand, is more likely genuine. But this synanthropic moth has been distributed essentially all over the globe, though many such introduced populations are not stable for long periods of time. Still, it is regularly found in Australia for example, about as far away from its native range as is possible on Earth. The adults are most often seen throughout the summer months, e.g. from March to September in the UK. Naturally, populations associated with humans can be encountered at any time of the year.

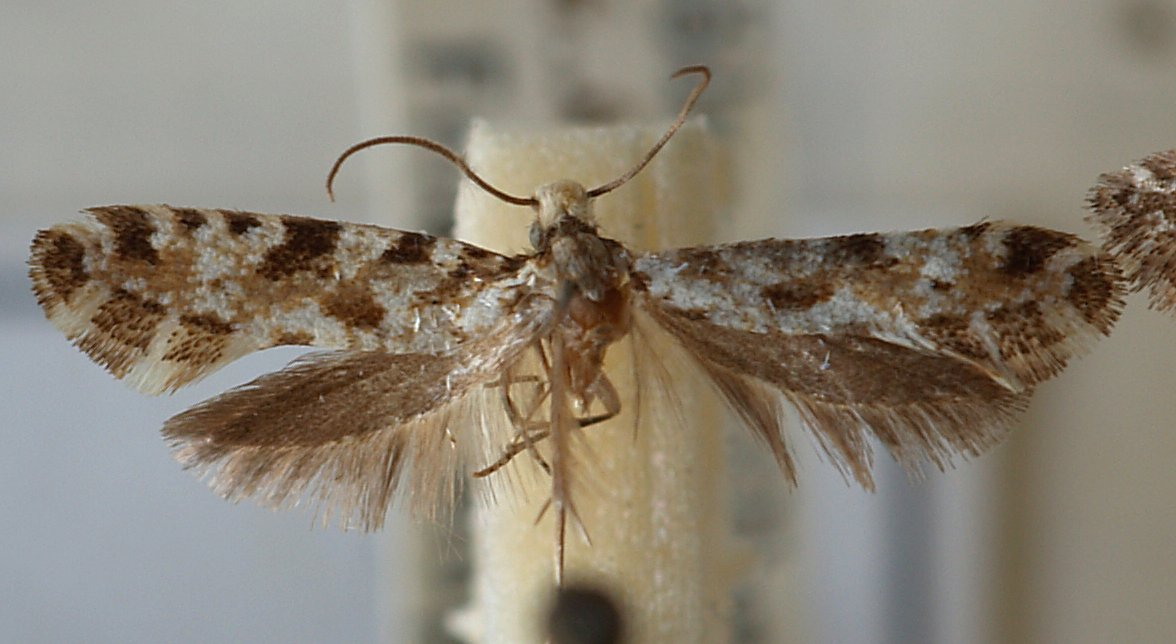
Mounted adult specimen from above

This small moth has a wingspan of 10–18 mm. The forewings are irregularly mottled black, white and grey, resembling close relatives such as the cork moth (N. cloacella). They have a row of large black spots on the leading edge, which merge with spots within the wing to form a rough band zigzagging along the length of the forewings. The hindwings are uniformly greyish-brown and surrounded by a fringe of long hairs. On the head, the adults have a tuft of yellowish-white hairs.

The caterpillar larvae eat rotting wood in the wild, though they prefer bracket fungi, usually Polyporales. Their mainstay food included Polyporaceae such as sulphur polypore (Laetiporus sulphureus), dryad's saddle (Polyporus squamosus) or turkey tail (Trametes versicolor), as well as Fomitopsidaceae, e.g. birch polypore (Piptoporus betulinus). But they have also been found on Serpula lacrymans of the quite unrelated Boletales.

Larvae in association with humans will feed on a variety of dry organic material, such as dried fruit (e.g.bilberries, Vaccinium) and mushrooms, cereal and legume seeds, flour, Topinambur (Helianthus tuberosus) stalks, and even cork (e.g. corks of wine and champagne bottles) and the ergot fungus Claviceps purpurea. Further records have been claimed from Capsicum annuum fruit, poppyseed (Papaver somniferum), bitter almonds (Prunus amygdalus amara) and beeswax, but it is not clear if they refer to this species or the cork moth.

== Synonyms ==
This widespread, often common and partially synanthropic species has been described times and again under a variety of scientific names, all now obsolete. In addition, it has been affected by the common problem of Nemapogon, namely uncertainty whether their specific names were of male and female gender, ending in -us or -a. Junior synonyms and other obsolete scientific names of the European grain moth are:

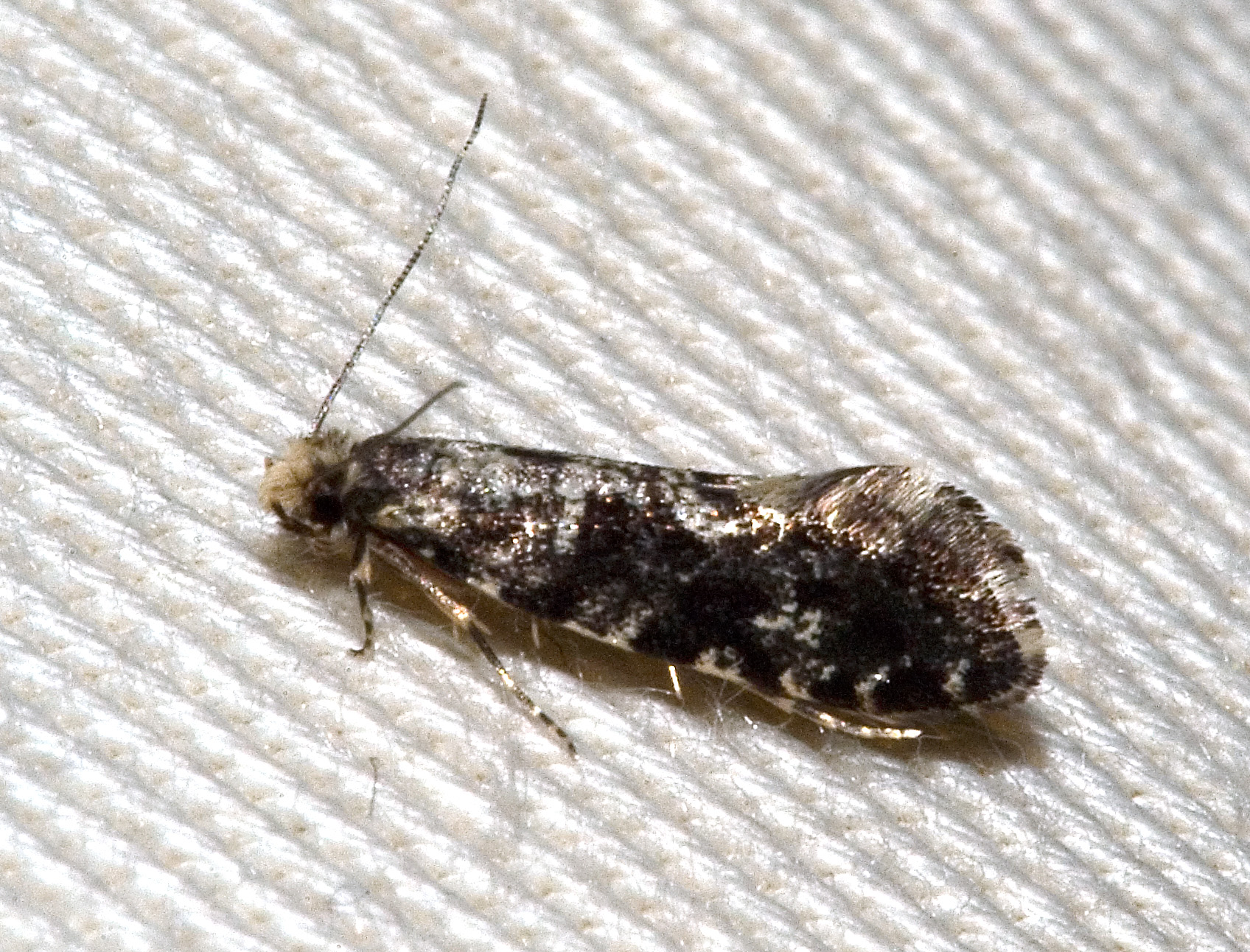
Nemapogon domesticella would be the name for the Austrian populations (shown: adult from Graz, Styria), but these moths are not consistently distinct from northern N. granella

- Nemapogon costotristrigella (Chambers, 1873)
- Nemapogon costistrigella (lapsus)
- Nemapogon domesticella (Scopoli, 1763)
- Nemapogon fascomaculella (lapsus)
- Nemapogon fenestrella (Scopoli, 1763b) (non Scopoli, 1763a: preoccupied)
- Nemapogon fuscicomella (Wörz, 1958)
- Nemapogon fuscomaculella (Chambers, 1873)
- Nemapogon granellus (lapsus)
- Nemapogon mancuniella (Hodgkinson, 1880)
- Nemapogon marmorella (Chambers, 1875)
- Nemapogon nebulosella (Geoffroy in Fourcroy, 1785)
- Nemapogon granella nigra (Dufrane, 1955)
- Nemapogon nigroatomella (Dietz, 1905)
- Nemapogon tesserella (Fabricius, 1794)
- Phalaena domesticella Scopoli, 1763
- Phalaena fenestrella Scopoli, 1763b (non Scopoli, 1763a: preoccupied)
- Phalaena (Tinea) granella Linnaeus, 1758
- Tinea costotristrigella Chambers, 1873
- Tinea fuscicomella Wörz, 1958
- Tinea fuscomaculella Chambers, 1873
- Tinea granella Linnaeus, 1758
- Tinea granella nigra Dufrane, 1955
- Tinea mancuniella Hodgkinson, 1880
- Tinea marmorella Chambers, 1875
- Tinea nebulosella Geoffroy in Fourcroy, 1785
- Tinea nigroatomella Dietz, 1905
- Tinea tesserella Fabricius, 1794

The supposed subspecies nigra form Belgium has turned out to be a chance form, rather than a distinct population.
