= Nemapogon arenbergeri =

Scientific classification
- Kingdom: Animalia
- Phylum: Arthropoda
- Clade: Pancrustacea
- Class: Insecta
- Order: Lepidoptera
- Family: Tineidae
- Genus: Nemapogon
- Species: N. arenbergeri

Binomial name
- Nemapogon arenbergeri Gaedike, 1986

Species of moth

Nemapogon arenbergeri is a moth of the family Tineidae. It is found in Turkey.
