= Nemapogon agenjoi =

Scientific classification
- Kingdom: Animalia
- Phylum: Arthropoda
- Clade: Pancrustacea
- Class: Insecta
- Order: Lepidoptera
- Family: Tineidae
- Genus: Nemapogon
- Species: N. agenjoi

Binomial name
- Nemapogon agenjoi Petersen, 1959

Synonyms
- Nemapogon hispanellus Gozmány, 1960

Species of moth

Nemapogon agenjoi is a moth of the family Tineidae. It is found in France, Spain, Portugal and Italy.
