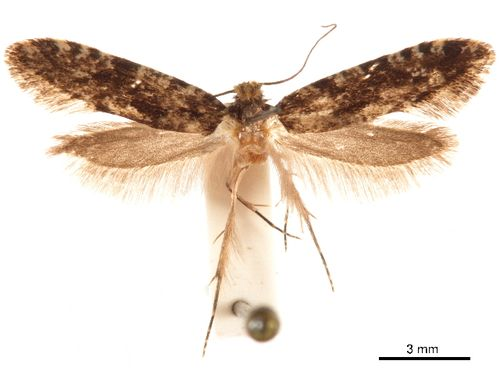

Scientific classification
- Kingdom: Animalia
- Phylum: Arthropoda
- Clade: Pancrustacea
- Class: Insecta
- Order: Lepidoptera
- Family: Tineidae
- Genus: Nemapogon
- Species: N. molybdanella

Binomial name
- Nemapogon molybdanella (Dietz, 1905)

Synonyms
- Tinea molybdanella Dietz, 1905

= Nemapogon molybdanella =

Species of moth

Nemapogon molybdanella is a moth of the family Tineidae. It is found in North America, where it has been recorded from Arizona, California and Maine.

The wingspan is 14–17 mm.

The larvae feed on polypore fungi.
