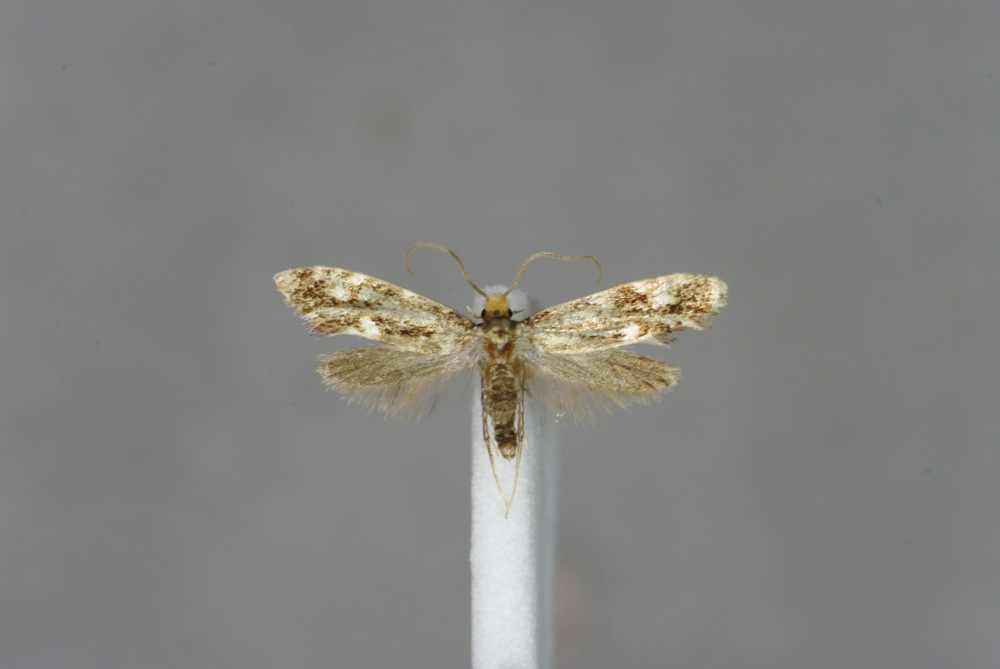

Scientific classification
- Kingdom: Animalia
- Phylum: Arthropoda
- Clade: Pancrustacea
- Class: Insecta
- Order: Lepidoptera
- Family: Tineidae
- Genus: Nemapogon
- Species: N. koenigi

Binomial name
- Nemapogon koenigi Capuse, 1967

Synonyms
- Tinea albipunctella Haworth, 1828 (preocc. Denis & Schiffermuller, 1775); Nemapogon wolffiella Karsholt & Nielsen, 1976

= Nemapogon koenigi =

Species of moth

Nemapogon koenigi is a moth of the family Tineidae. It is found in most of Europe, except Ireland, Belgium, the Iberian Peninsula, Ukraine, Greece and probably most of the Balkan Peninsula.

The wingspan is 9–14 mm.

The larvae feed on fungi and dead and decaying wood.
