= Nemapogon nevadella =

Scientific classification
- Kingdom: Animalia
- Phylum: Arthropoda
- Clade: Pancrustacea
- Class: Insecta
- Order: Lepidoptera
- Family: Tineidae
- Genus: Nemapogon
- Species: N. nevadella

Binomial name
- Nemapogon nevadella (Caradja, 1920)

Synonyms
- Tinea nevadella Caradja, 1920

Species of moth

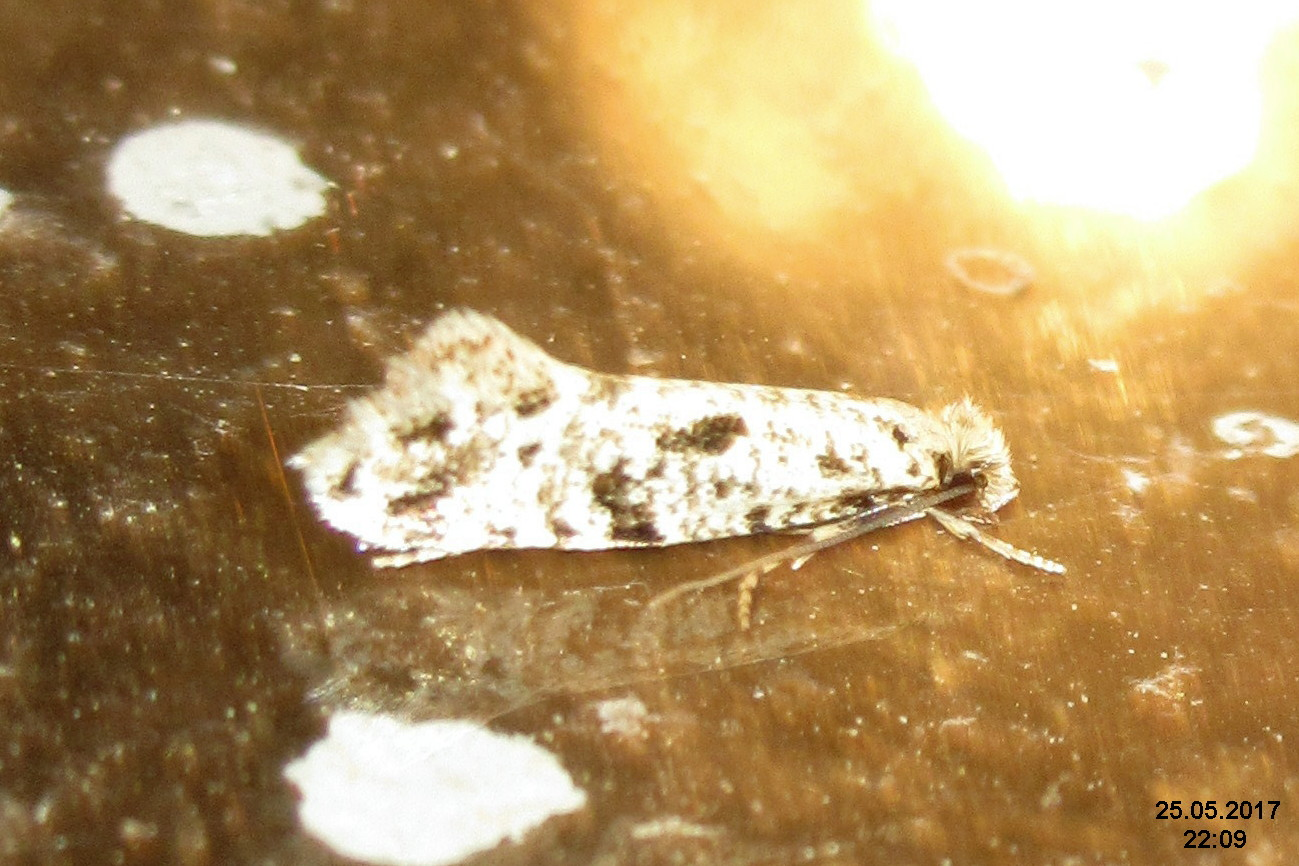
Nemapogon nevadella Jump to navigationJump to search

Nemapogon nevadella is a moth of the family Tineidae. It is found in Italy and on the Iberian Peninsula, Sardinia and the Balearic Islands.
