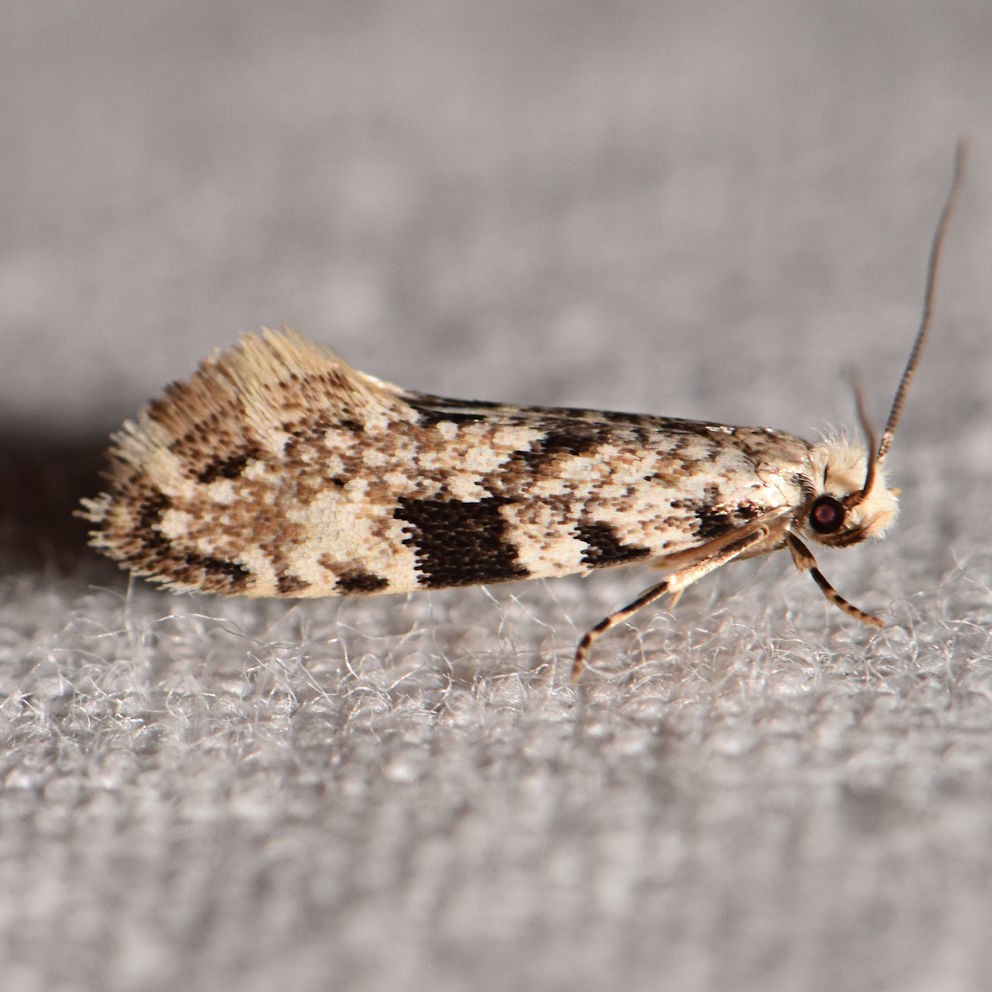

Scientific classification
- Kingdom: Animalia
- Phylum: Arthropoda
- Clade: Pancrustacea
- Class: Insecta
- Order: Lepidoptera
- Family: Tineidae
- Genus: Nemapogon
- Species: N. auropulvella

Binomial name
- Nemapogon auropulvella (Chambers, 1873)

Synonyms
- Tinea auropulvella Chambers, 1873; Nemapogon auripulvella

= Nemapogon auropulvella =

Species of moth

Nemapogon auropulvella is a moth of the family Tineidae. It is found in North America, where it has been recorded from Florida, Illinois, Indiana, Maine, Manitoba, Maryland, Minnesota, Ohio, Ontario, Quebec, Tennessee, West Virginia and Wisconsin.

The forewings are snowy white, dusted with pale reddish or brownish golden. Adults have been recorded on wing from May to September.

Larvae have been recorded feeding on fungi and detritus.
