= Nemapogon grossi =

Scientific classification
- Kingdom: Animalia
- Phylum: Arthropoda
- Clade: Pancrustacea
- Class: Insecta
- Order: Lepidoptera
- Family: Tineidae
- Genus: Nemapogon
- Species: N. grossi

Binomial name
- Nemapogon grossi Gaedike, 2007

Species of moth

Nemapogon grossi is a moth of the family Tineidae. It is found in Turkey.

The wingspan is about 15 mm. The forewings are whitish, with a brown pattern. The hindwings are shining whitish.

== Etymology ==
The species is named in honour of Franz Joseph Groß, who collected the species.
