= Nemapogon caucasicus =

Scientific classification
- Kingdom: Animalia
- Phylum: Arthropoda
- Clade: Pancrustacea
- Class: Insecta
- Order: Lepidoptera
- Family: Tineidae
- Genus: Nemapogon
- Species: N. caucasicus

Binomial name
- Nemapogon caucasicus (Zagulajev, 1964)

Synonyms
- Longiductus caucasicus Zagulajev, 1964; Nemapogon caucasica

Species of moth

Nemapogon caucasicus is a moth of the family Tineidae. It is found in the Caucasus in southern European Russia.
