= Nemapogon mesoplaca =

Scientific classification
- Kingdom: Animalia
- Phylum: Arthropoda
- Clade: Pancrustacea
- Class: Insecta
- Order: Lepidoptera
- Family: Tineidae
- Genus: Nemapogon
- Species: N. mesoplaca

Binomial name
- Nemapogon mesoplaca (Meyrick, 1919)

Synonyms
- Tinea mesoplaca Meyrick, 1919

Species of moth

Nemapogon mesoplaca is a moth of the family Tineidae. It is found in India.
