= Nemapogon palmella =

Scientific classification
- Kingdom: Animalia
- Phylum: Arthropoda
- Clade: Pancrustacea
- Class: Insecta
- Order: Lepidoptera
- Family: Tineidae
- Genus: Nemapogon
- Species: N. palmella

Binomial name
- Nemapogon palmella (Chrétien, 1908)

Synonyms
- Tinea palmella Chrétien, 1908; Nemapogon oueddarella Amsel 1952

Species of moth

Nemapogon palmella is a moth of the family Tineidae. It is found on the Canary Islands and in North Africa, where it has been recorded from Morocco.
