= Archinemapogon bacurianus =

Scientific classification
- Kingdom: Animalia
- Phylum: Arthropoda
- Class: Insecta
- Order: Lepidoptera
- Family: Tineidae
- Genus: Archinemapogon
- Species: A. bacurianus

Binomial name
- Archinemapogon bacurianus Zagulajev, 1962

Species of moth

Archinemapogon bacurianus is a moth of the family Tineidae. It found in Georgia (the Caucasus).

The wingspan is about 21 mm.
