= Nemapogon roburella =

Scientific classification
- Kingdom: Animalia
- Phylum: Arthropoda
- Clade: Pancrustacea
- Class: Insecta
- Order: Lepidoptera
- Family: Tineidae
- Genus: Nemapogon
- Species: N. roburella

Binomial name
- Nemapogon roburella (Dietz, 1905)

Synonyms
- Tinea roburella Dietz, 1905

Species of moth

Nemapogon roburella is a moth of the family Tineidae. It is found in North America, where it has been recorded from New Jersey and Alberta.
