= Nemapogon levantinus =

Scientific classification
- Kingdom: Animalia
- Phylum: Arthropoda
- Clade: Pancrustacea
- Class: Insecta
- Order: Lepidoptera
- Family: Tineidae
- Genus: Nemapogon
- Species: N. levantinus

Binomial name
- Nemapogon levantinus Petersen, 1961

Species of moth

Nemapogon levantinus is a moth of the family Tineidae. It is found in Syria.
