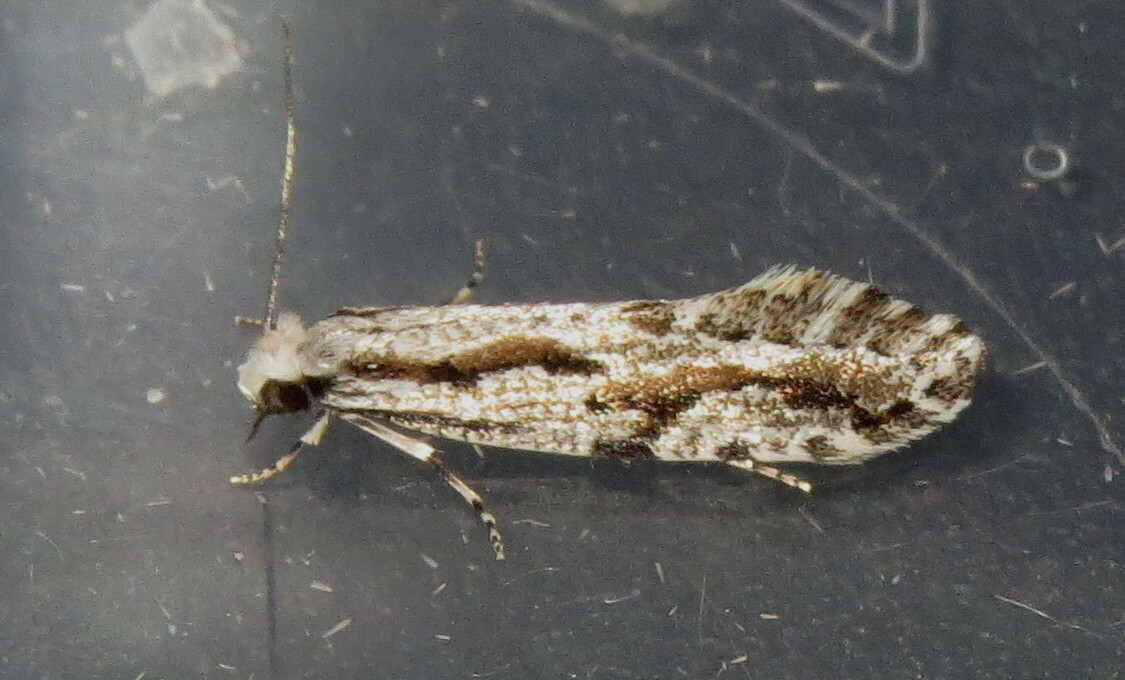

Scientific classification
- Kingdom: Animalia
- Phylum: Arthropoda
- Class: Insecta
- Order: Lepidoptera
- Family: Tineidae
- Genus: Archinemapogon
- Species: A. yildizae

Binomial name
- Archinemapogon yildizae Koçak, 1981

Synonyms
- Tinea arcuatella Stainton, 1854; Tinea laterella Thunberg, 1794; Tinea sexguttella Mann, 1873; Infurcitinea yildizae; Tinea picarella Hübner, 1796 (nec Clerck, 1759)

= Archinemapogon yildizae =

Species of moth

Archinemapogon yildizae is a moth of the family Tineidae. It was described by Ahmet Ömer Koçak in 1981. It is found in most of Europe, except Ireland, the Benelux, the Iberian Peninsula and most of the Balkan Peninsula. The habitat consists of birch woodlands.

The wingspan is 14–21 mm. Adults are on wing from May to July.

The larvae feed on bracket fungi (Fomes or Piptorus species) growing on Betula.
