= Nemapogon anatolica =

Scientific classification
- Kingdom: Animalia
- Phylum: Arthropoda
- Clade: Pancrustacea
- Class: Insecta
- Order: Lepidoptera
- Family: Tineidae
- Genus: Nemapogon
- Species: N. anatolica

Binomial name
- Nemapogon anatolica Gaedike, 1986

Species of moth

Nemapogon anatolica is a moth of the family Tineidae. It is found in Croatia, Greece, Turkey and Jordan.
