= Archinemapogon assamensis =

Scientific classification
- Kingdom: Animalia
- Phylum: Arthropoda
- Class: Insecta
- Order: Lepidoptera
- Family: Tineidae
- Genus: Archinemapogon
- Species: A. assamensis

Binomial name
- Archinemapogon assamensis Robinson, 1980

Species of moth

Archinemapogon assamensis is a moth of the family Tineidae. It found in India and Russia.
