= Nemapogon robusta =

Scientific classification
- Kingdom: Animalia
- Phylum: Arthropoda
- Clade: Pancrustacea
- Class: Insecta
- Order: Lepidoptera
- Family: Tineidae
- Genus: Nemapogon
- Species: N. robusta

Binomial name
- Nemapogon robusta Gaedike, 2000

Species of moth

Nemapogon robusta is a moth of the family Tineidae. It is found in the Russian Far East.
