= Archinemapogon schromicus =

Scientific classification
- Kingdom: Animalia
- Phylum: Arthropoda
- Class: Insecta
- Order: Lepidoptera
- Family: Tineidae
- Genus: Archinemapogon
- Species: A. schromicus

Binomial name
- Archinemapogon schromicus Zagulajev, 1964

Species of moth

Archinemapogon schromicus is a moth of the family Tineidae. It found in Georgia (the Caucasus).

The wingspan is about 18 mm. The forewings are silvery white with a black pattern.
