= Archinemapogon erasella =

Scientific classification
- Kingdom: Animalia
- Phylum: Arthropoda
- Clade: Pancrustacea
- Class: Insecta
- Order: Lepidoptera
- Family: Tineidae
- Genus: Archinemapogon
- Species: A. erasella

Binomial name
- Archinemapogon erasella (Zeller, 1863)

Synonyms
- Tinea erasella Zeller, 1863

Species of moth

Archinemapogon erasella is a moth of the family Tineidae. It is found in Venezuela as well as other countries in South America.
