= Nemapogon scholzi =

Scientific classification
- Kingdom: Animalia
- Phylum: Arthropoda
- Clade: Pancrustacea
- Class: Insecta
- Order: Lepidoptera
- Family: Tineidae
- Genus: Nemapogon
- Species: N. scholzi

Binomial name
- Nemapogon scholzi Sutter, 2000

Species of moth

Nemapogon scholzi is a moth of the family Tineidae. It found in Greece and on Crete.
