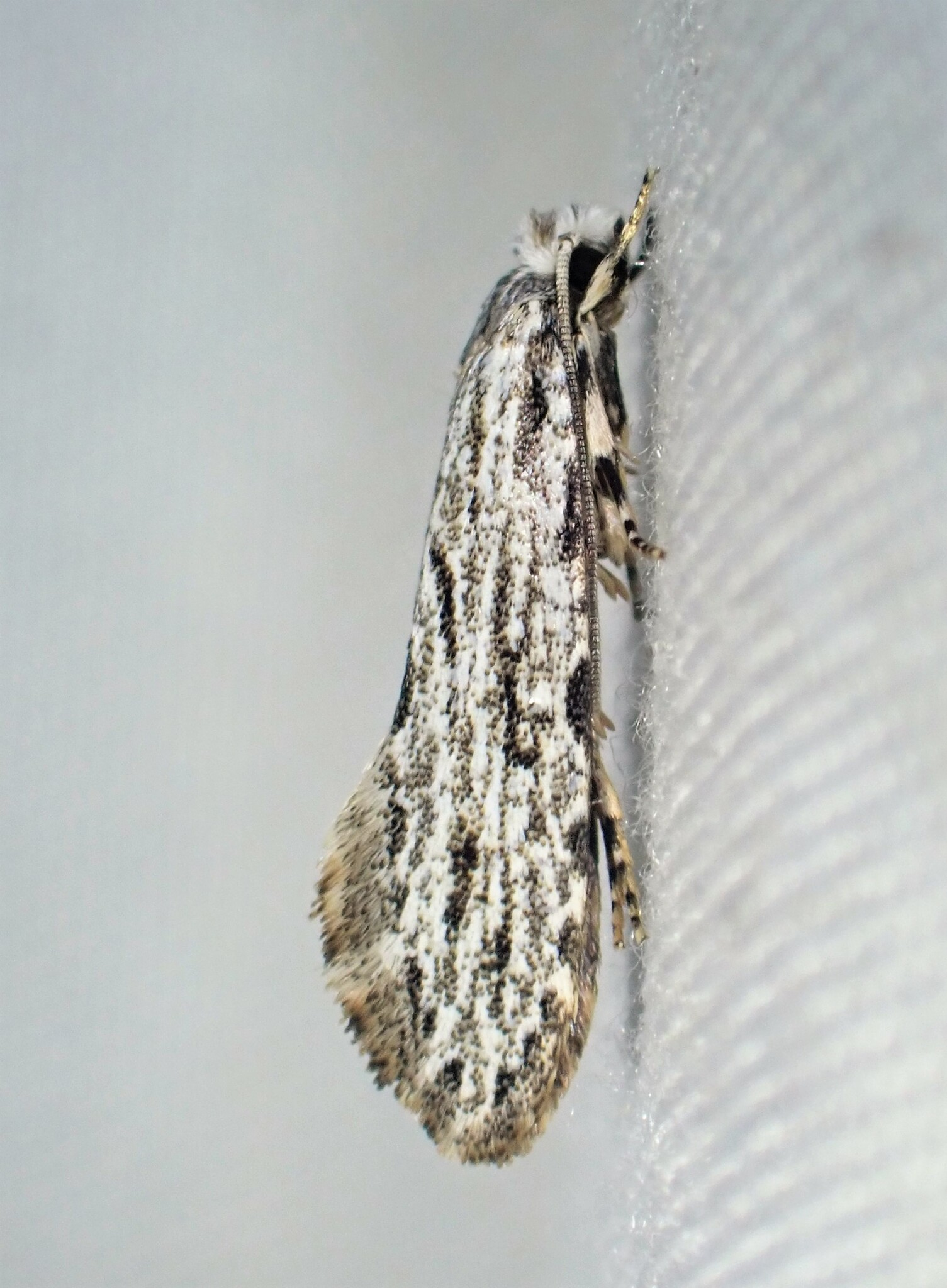
- Nemapogon multistriatella, Canada

Scientific classification
- Kingdom: Animalia
- Phylum: Arthropoda
- Clade: Pancrustacea
- Class: Insecta
- Order: Lepidoptera
- Family: Tineidae
- Genus: Nemapogon
- Species: N. multistriatella

Binomial name
- Nemapogon multistriatella (Dietz, 1905)

Synonyms
- Tinea multistriatella Dietz, 1905

= Nemapogon multistriatella =

Species of moth

Nemapogon multistriatella is a moth of the family Tineidae. It is found in North America, where it has been recorded from Illinois, Maine, Maryland, Oklahoma, Ontario, South Carolina and West Virginia.
