= Nemapogon nevellus =

Scientific classification
- Kingdom: Animalia
- Phylum: Arthropoda
- Clade: Pancrustacea
- Class: Insecta
- Order: Lepidoptera
- Family: Tineidae
- Genus: Nemapogon
- Species: N. nevellus

Binomial name
- Nemapogon nevellus Zagulajev, 1963

Species of moth

Nemapogon nevellus is a moth of the family Tineidae. It is found in north-western Russia.
