= Nemapogon somchetiella =

Scientific classification
- Kingdom: Animalia
- Phylum: Arthropoda
- Clade: Pancrustacea
- Class: Insecta
- Order: Lepidoptera
- Family: Tineidae
- Genus: Nemapogon
- Species: N. somchetiella

Binomial name
- Nemapogon somchetiella Zagulajev, 1961

Species of moth

Nemapogon somchetiella is a moth of the family Tineidae. It is found in Italy and Russia (the Caucasus region).
