= Nemapogon sardicus =

Scientific classification
- Kingdom: Animalia
- Phylum: Arthropoda
- Clade: Pancrustacea
- Class: Insecta
- Order: Lepidoptera
- Family: Tineidae
- Genus: Nemapogon
- Species: N. sardicus

Binomial name
- Nemapogon sardicus Gaedike, 1983

Synonyms
- Nemapogon sardica

Species of moth

Nemapogon sardicus is a moth of the family Tineidae. It is found on Sardinia.
