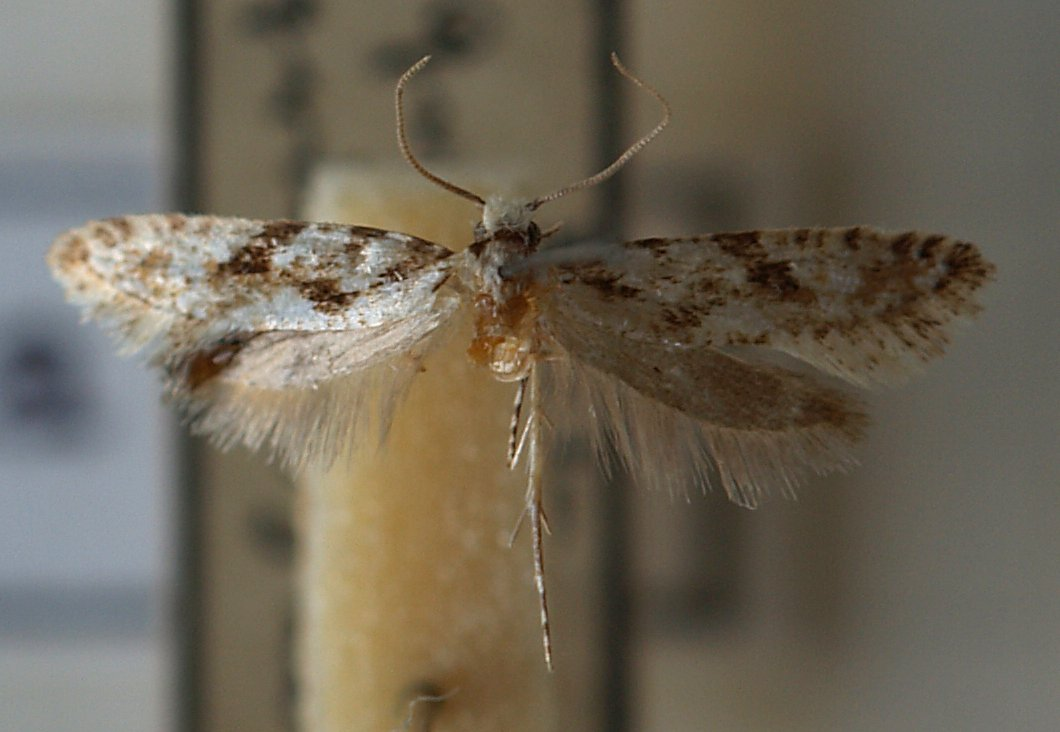

Scientific classification
- Kingdom: Animalia
- Phylum: Arthropoda
- Clade: Pancrustacea
- Class: Insecta
- Order: Lepidoptera
- Family: Tineidae
- Genus: Nemapogon
- Species: N. quercicolella

Binomial name
- Nemapogon quercicolella (Zeller, 1852)

Synonyms
- Tinea quercicolella Zeller, 1852

= Nemapogon quercicolella =

Species of moth

Nemapogon quercicolella is a moth of the family Tineidae. It is found in Eastern Europe.

The moth flies in June depending on the location.

The larvae feed on mushrooms and fungus.
