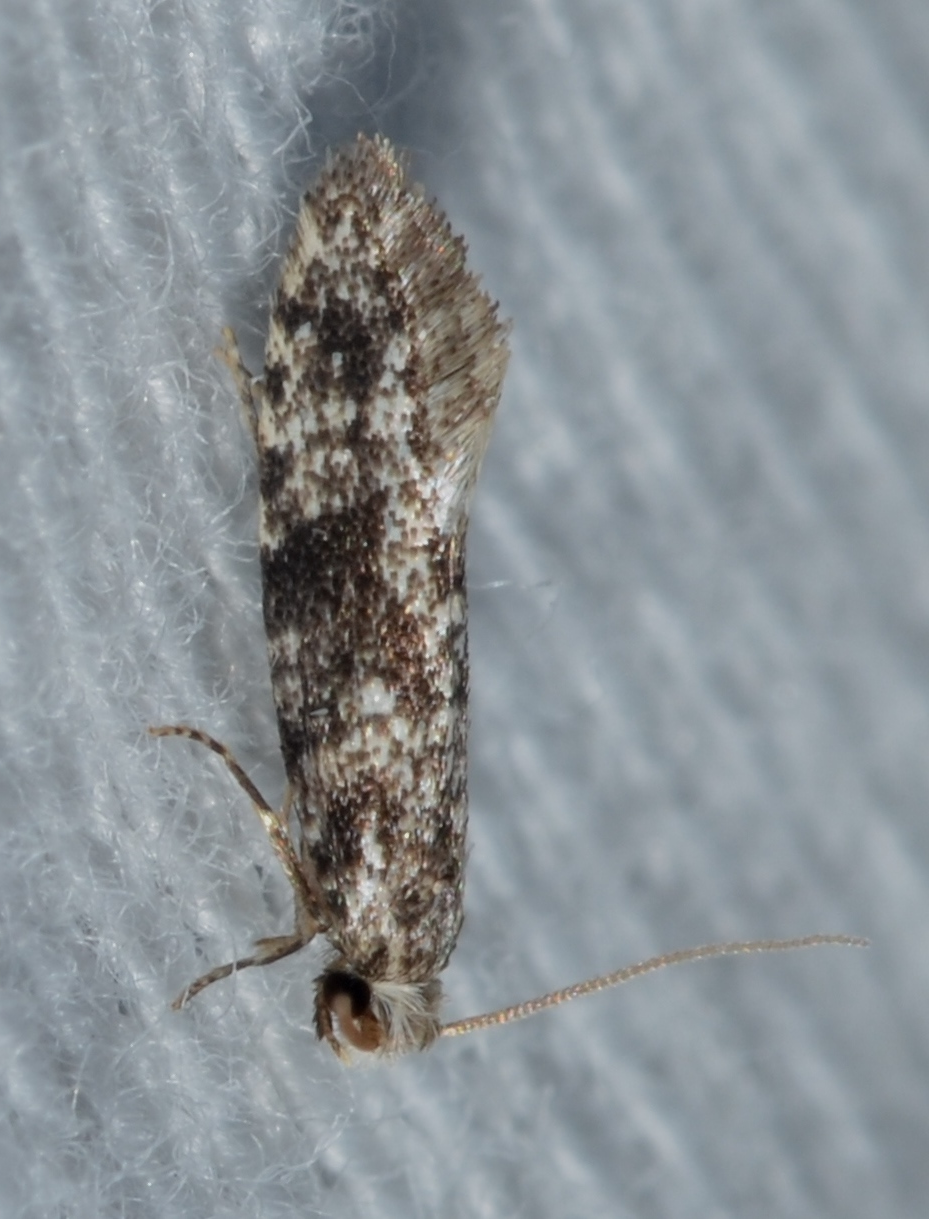

Scientific classification
- Kingdom: Animalia
- Phylum: Arthropoda
- Clade: Pancrustacea
- Class: Insecta
- Order: Lepidoptera
- Family: Tineidae
- Genus: Nemapogon
- Species: N. interstitiella

Binomial name
- Nemapogon interstitiella (Dietz, 1905)

Synonyms
- Tinea interstitiella Dietz, 1905; Archinemapogon interstitiella

= Nemapogon interstitiella =

Species of moth

Nemapogon interstitiella is a species of moth in the family Tineidae. It is found in North America, where it has been recorded from Georgia, Maine, Maryland and Tennessee.
