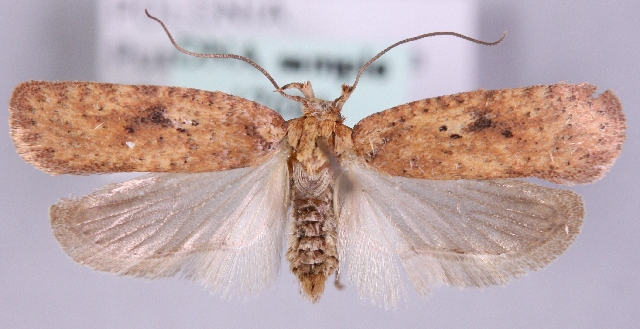

Scientific classification
- Kingdom: Animalia
- Phylum: Arthropoda
- Clade: Pancrustacea
- Class: Insecta
- Order: Lepidoptera
- Family: Depressariidae
- Genus: Agonopterix
- Species: A. laterella

Binomial name
- Agonopterix laterella (Denis & Schiffermuller, 1775)

Synonyms
- Tinea laterella Denis & Schiffermuller, 1775; Depressaria incarnatella Zeller, 1854; Tinea heraclella Hübner, [1813]

= Agonopterix laterella =

Species of moth

Agonopterix laterella is a moth of the family Depressariidae. It is found in most of Europe.

The wingspan is 20–25 mm. Adults are on wing from July to March.

The larvae feed on Centaurea cyanus.
