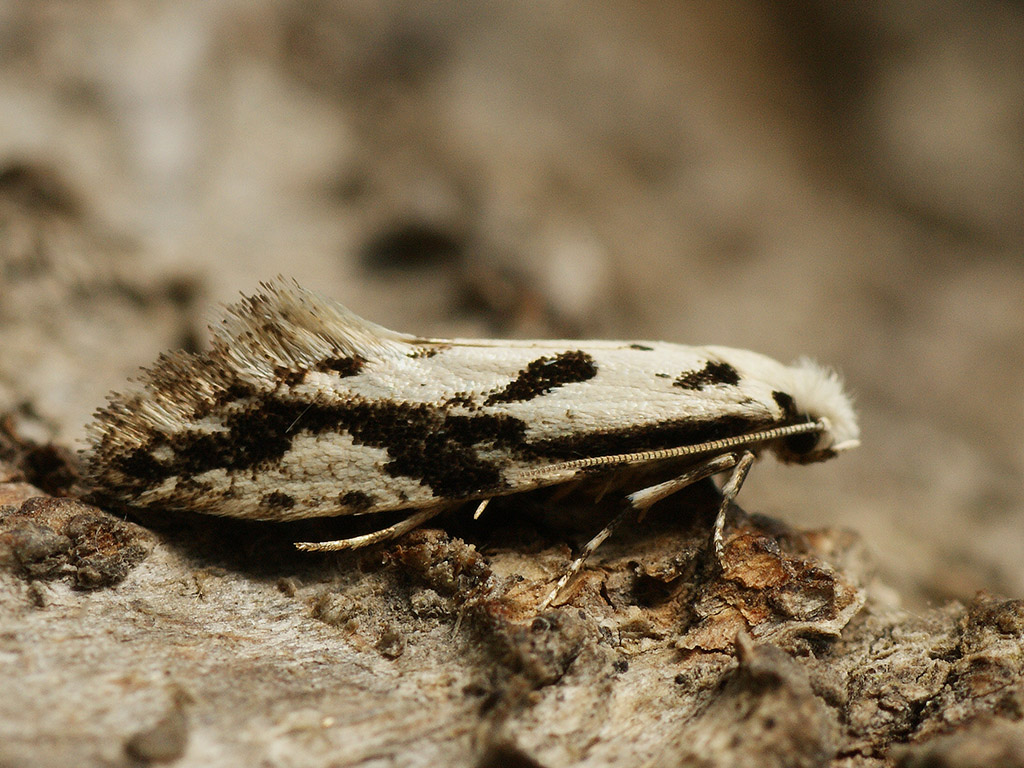

Scientific classification
- Kingdom: Animalia
- Phylum: Arthropoda
- Clade: Pancrustacea
- Class: Insecta
- Order: Lepidoptera
- Family: Tineidae
- Genus: Nemapogon
- Species: N. picarella

Binomial name
- Nemapogon picarella (Clerck, 1759)

Synonyms
- Phalaena picarella Clerck, 1759; Scardia acerella Treitschke, 1832; Tinea rigaella Sodoffsky, 1830; Nemapogon riganella Zeller, 1839

= Nemapogon picarella =

Species of moth

Nemapogon picarella, the pied clothes moth, is a moth of the family Tineidae. It was described by Carl Alexander Clerck in 1759. It is found in most of Europe, except Ireland, the Benelux, the Iberian Peninsula and the Balkan Peninsula.

The wingspan is 12–19 mm. Adults are black and white. They are on wing from June to July.

Larvae have been recorded feeding on bracket fungus (including Piptoporus betulinus) and dead wood.
