= Nemapogon oregonella =

Scientific classification
- Kingdom: Animalia
- Phylum: Arthropoda
- Clade: Pancrustacea
- Class: Insecta
- Order: Lepidoptera
- Family: Tineidae
- Genus: Nemapogon
- Species: N. oregonella

Binomial name
- Nemapogon oregonella (Busck, 1900)

Synonyms
- Tinea oregonella Busck, 1901; Archinemapogon oregonella

Species of moth

Nemapogon oregonella is a moth of the family Tineidae. It is found in North America, where it has been recorded from Oregon and California.
