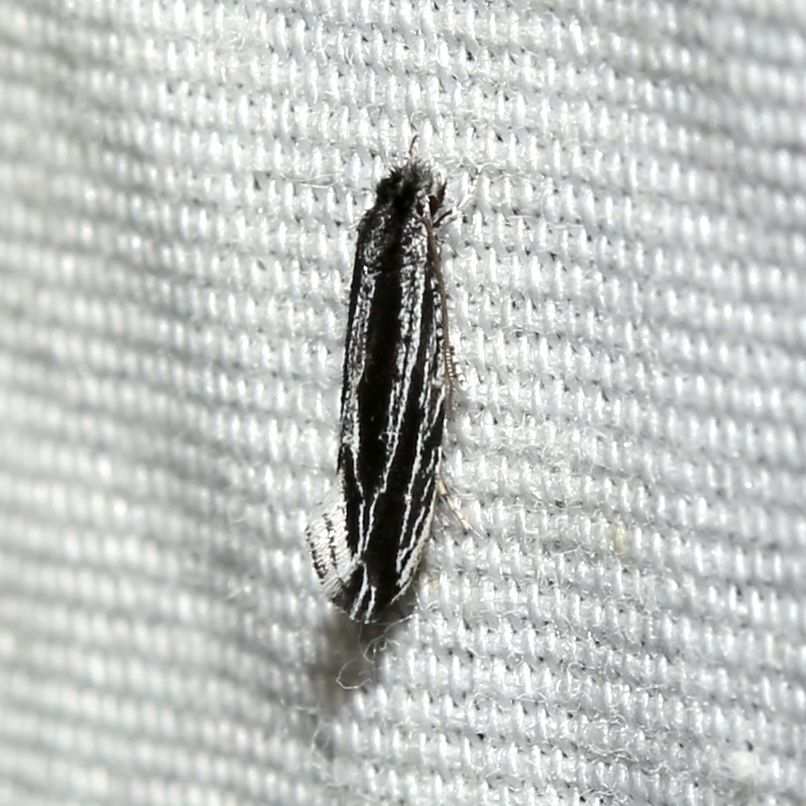

Scientific classification
- Kingdom: Animalia
- Phylum: Arthropoda
- Clade: Pancrustacea
- Class: Insecta
- Order: Lepidoptera
- Family: Tineidae
- Genus: Nemapogon
- Species: N. rileyi

Binomial name
- Nemapogon rileyi (Dietz, 1905)

Synonyms
- Tinea rileyi Dietz, 1905; Archinemapogon rileyi; Tinea atriflua Meyrick, 1919

= Nemapogon rileyi =

Species of moth

Nemapogon rileyi is a moth of the family Tineidae. It is found in North America, where it has been recorded from Alabama, Florida, Indiana, Maine, Mississippi, New Jersey, Ohio, South Carolina and Texas.

The wingspan is 13–16 mm. Adults have been recorded on wing year round, but the flight times depend on the location.
