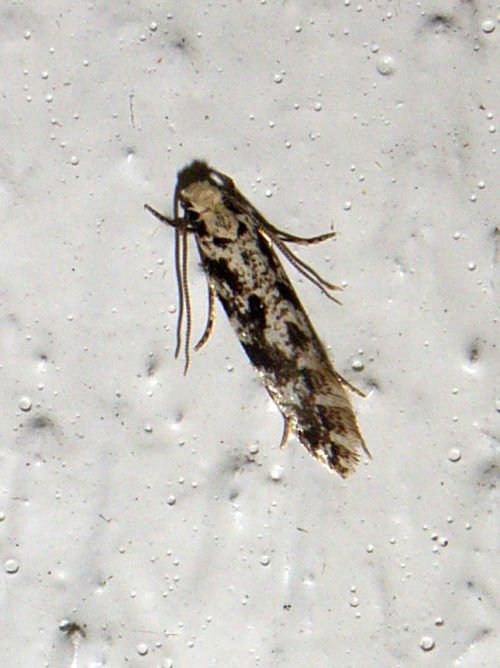
- Adult Nemapogon variatella, Espoo, Finland

Scientific classification
- Kingdom: Animalia
- Phylum: Arthropoda
- Clade: Pancrustacea
- Class: Insecta
- Order: Lepidoptera
- Family: Tineidae
- Subfamily: Nemapogoninae
- Genus: Nemapogon; Schrank, 1802

Type species
- Phalaena (Tinea) granella Linnaeus, 1758

Diversity
- 69 species

Synonyms
- Numerous, see text

= Nemapogon =

Genus of fungus moths

Nemapogon is a genus of the fungus moth family, Tineidae. Therein, it belongs to the subfamily Nemapogoninae. As evident by its name, it is the type genus of its subfamily.

== Species ==
As of 2007, 69 species of Nemapogon had been described. New ones are still being discovered on a regular basis:

- Nemapogon acapnopennella (Clemens, 1863) (= N. minutipulnella, N. minutipulvella)
- Nemapogon agenjoi Petersen, 1959 (= N. hispanellus)
- Nemapogon agnathosella Gaedike, 2000
- Nemapogon algerica Gaedike, 2009
- Nemapogon alticolella Zagulajev, 1961
- Nemapogon anatolica Gaedike, 1986
- Nemapogon angulifasciella (Dietz, 1905)
- Nemapogon arcosuensis Gaedike, 2007
- Nemapogon arenbergeri Gaedike, 1986
- Nemapogon asyntacta (Meyrick, 1917)
- Nemapogon auropulvella (Chambers, 1873) (= N. auripulvella)
- Nemapogon bachmarensis Zagulajev, 1964
- Nemapogon barikotellus Petersen, 1973
- Nemapogon bidentata Xiao & Li, 2010
- Nemapogon brandti Gaedike, 1986
- Nemapogon caucasicus (Zagulajev, 1964)
- Nemapogon clematella (Fabricius, 1781) (= Alucita niveella, N. arcellus, N. auritinctella, N. clematea N. clematellus, N. punctella, N. repandella)
- Nemapogon cloacella – cork moth
- Nemapogon cyprica Gaedike, 1986
- Nemapogon defectella (Zeller, 1873)
- Nemapogon defrisiensis (Zagulajev, 1964)
- Nemapogon diarthrota (Meyrick, 1936)
- Nemapogon echinata Gaedike, 2000
- Nemapogon flabellata Xiao & Li, 2010
- Nemapogon flavifrons Petersen, 1959 (= N. kabulianus)
- Nemapogon fungivorella (Benander, 1939) (= N. fungivorellus)
- Nemapogon fuscalbella (Chrétien, 1908)
- Nemapogon geniculatella (Dietz, 1905)
- Nemapogon gerasimovi Zagulajev, 1961
- Nemapogon gliriella (Heyden, 1865) (= N. cachetiellus, N. ibericus)
- Nemapogon granella – European grain moth
- Nemapogon gravosaellus Petersen, 1957 (= N. borshomi, N. gravosaella)
- Nemapogon grossi Gaedike, 2007
- Nemapogon hispanica Petersen & Gaedike, 1992
- Nemapogon hungaricus Gozmány, 1960 (= N. pliginskii)
- Nemapogon inconditella (Lucas, 1956) (= N. buckwelli, N. heydeni, N. thomasi)
- Nemapogon interstitiella (Dietz, 1905)
- Nemapogon kashmirensis Robinson, 1980
- Nemapogon kasyi Gaedike, 1986
- Nemapogon koenigi Capuse, 1967 (= N. wolffiella)
- Nemapogon lagodechiellus Zagulajev, 1962
- Nemapogon leechi Robinson, 1980
- Nemapogon levantinus Petersen, 1961
- Nemapogon mesoplaca (Meyrick, 1919)
- Nemapogon meridionella (Zagulajev 1962) (= N. meridionalis)
- Nemapogon molybdanella (Dietz, 1905)
- Nemapogon multistriatella (Dietz, 1905)
- Nemapogon nevadella (Caradja, 1920)
- Nemapogon nevellus Zagulajev, 1963
- Nemapogon nigralbella (Zeller, 1859) (= N. nigralbellus)
- Nemapogon ningshanensis Xiao & Li, 2010
- Nemapogon ophrionella (Dietz, 1905)
- Nemapogon orientalis Petersen, 1961 (= N. falstriella)
- Nemapogon oregonella (Busck, 1900)
- Nemapogon palmella (Chretien 1908) (= N. oueddarella)
- Nemapogon picarella (Clerck, 1759) (= N. acerella, N. picarellus, N. rigaella)
- Nemapogon quercicolella
- Nemapogon reisseri Petersen & Gaedike, 1983
- Nemapogon rileyi (Dietz, 1905) (= N. atriflua)
- Nemapogon roburella (Dietz, 1905)
- Nemapogon robusta Gaedike, 2000
- Nemapogon ruricolella (Stainton, 1859) (= N. cochylidella)
- Nemapogon sardicus Gaedike, 1983
- Nemapogon scholzi Sutter, 2000
- Nemapogon scutifera Gaedike, 2007
- Nemapogon signatellus Petersen, 1957
- Nemapogon similella Gaedike, 2007
- Nemapogon somchetiella Zagulajev, 1961
- Nemapogon teberdellus (Zagulajev 1963) (= N. georgiellus)
- Nemapogon tylodes (Meyrick, 1919)
- Nemapogon variatella (Clemens, 1859) (= N. apicisignatella)
- Nemapogon vartianae Gaedike, 1986

== Synonyms ==
Junior synonyms of Nemapogon are:

- Anemapogon Zaguljaev, 1963
- "Brosis" Hübner, 1806 (suppressed name)
- Brosis Hübner, 1822 (non Billberg, 1820: preoccupied)
- Diaphthirusa Hübner, [1825]
- Longiductus Zaguljaev, 1964
- Nematopogon Agassiz, 1847 (unjustified emendation; non Zeller, 1839: preoccupied)
- Paranemapogon Zaguljaev, 1964
- Petalographis Zaguljaev, 1962

The genus name Brosis was first proposed by J. Hübner in 1806, but in a book – the famous Tentamen determinsationis ("Preliminary examination") – that was essentially an immense discussion paper and not a valid work of zoological nomenclature. When Hübner came to validly erect the genus in his 1822 genus list (Systematisch-alphabetisches Verzeichnis), it had already been used by G.J. Billberg for what is nowadays considered the Incurvariidae genus Incurvaria.

== Gallery ==
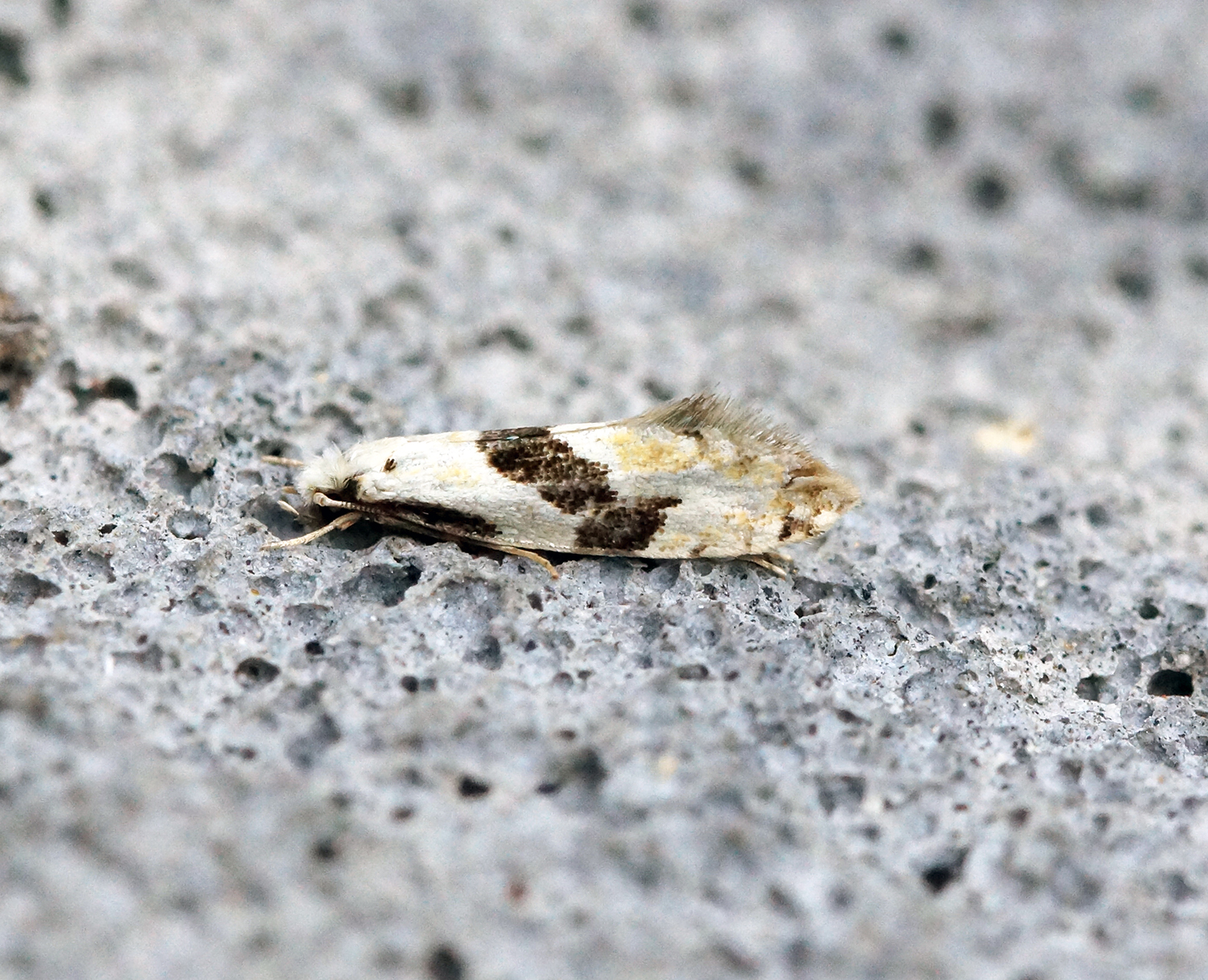
Nemapogon clematella

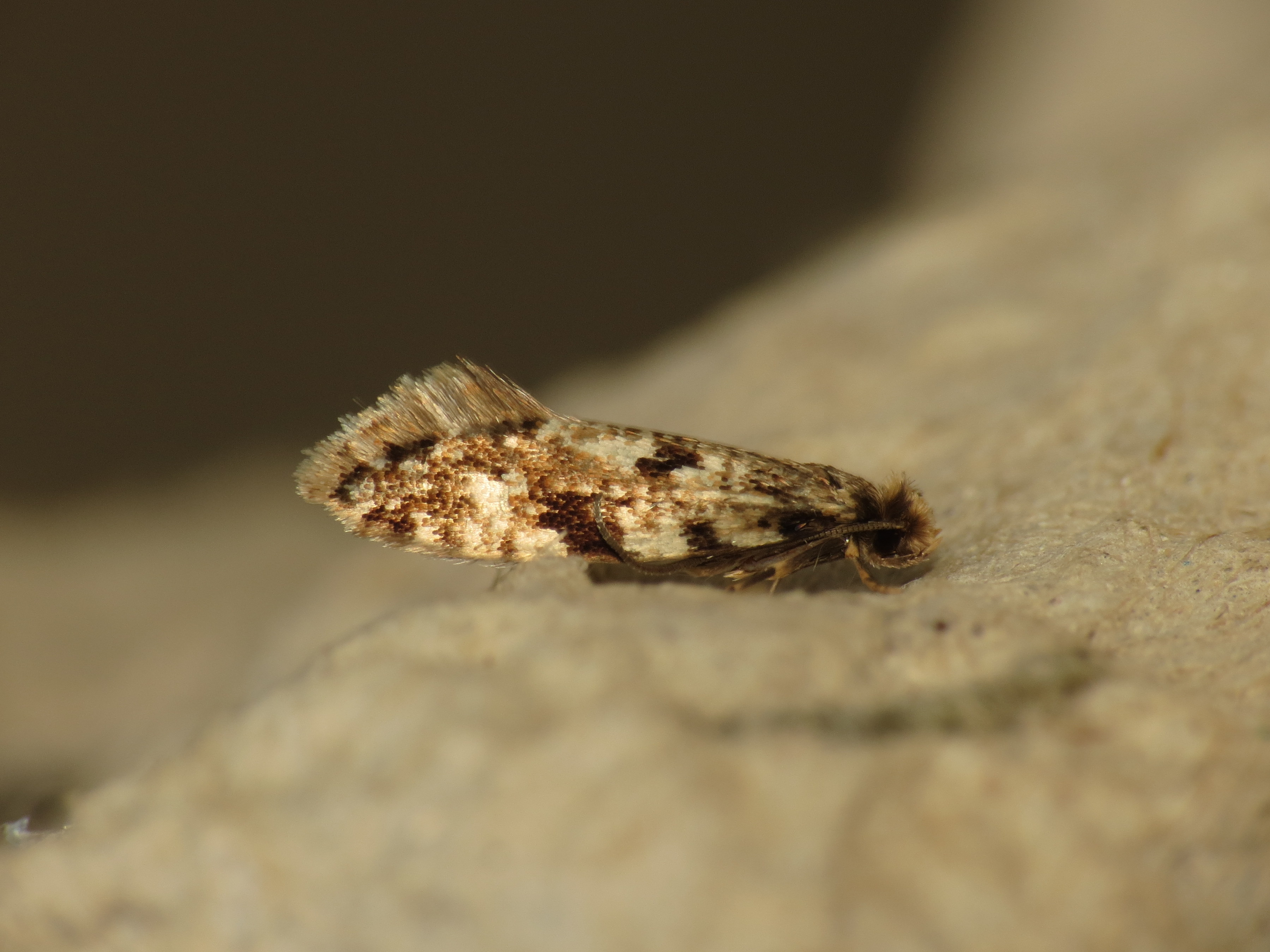
Nemapogon cloacella

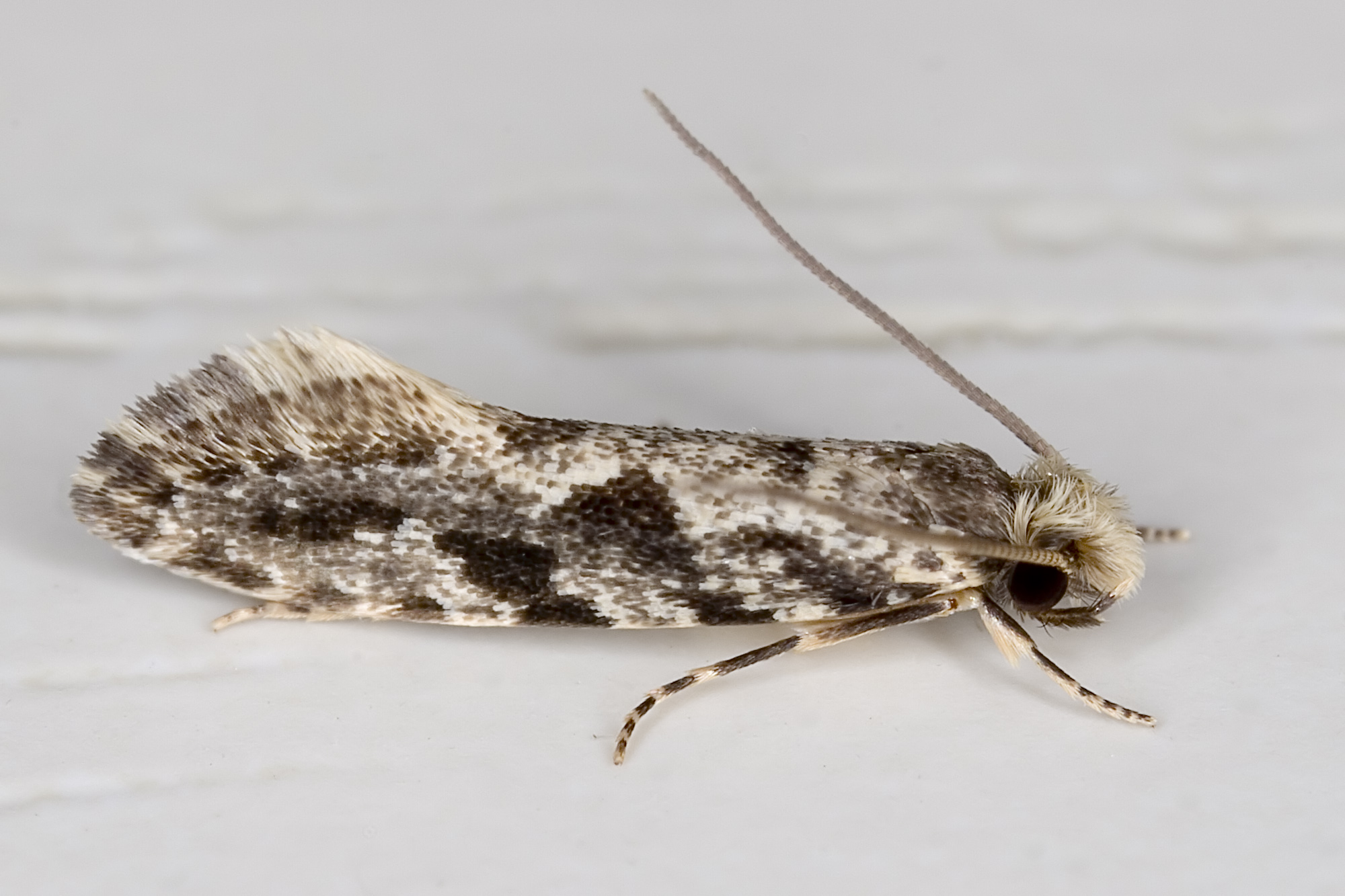
Nemapogon.granella

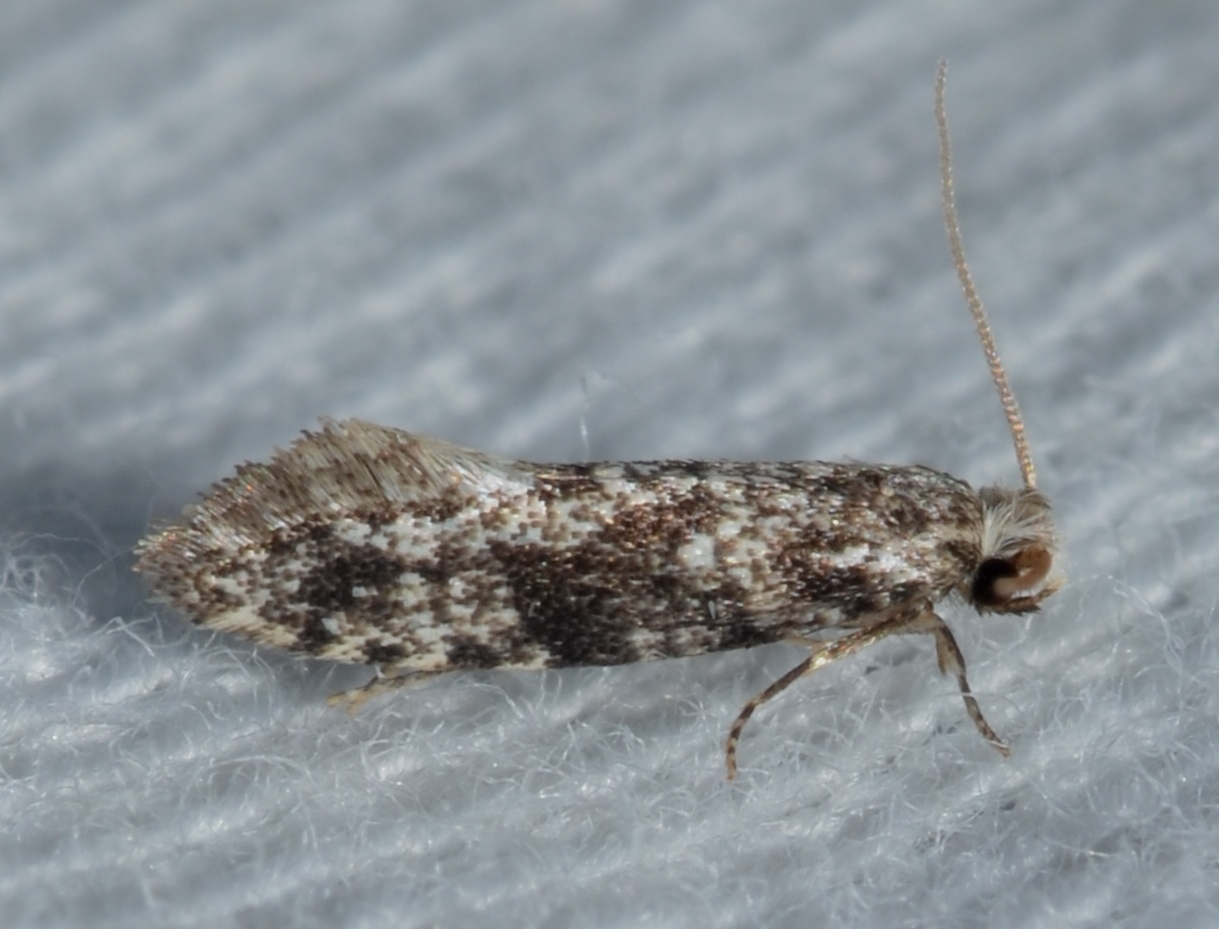
Nemapogon interstitiella

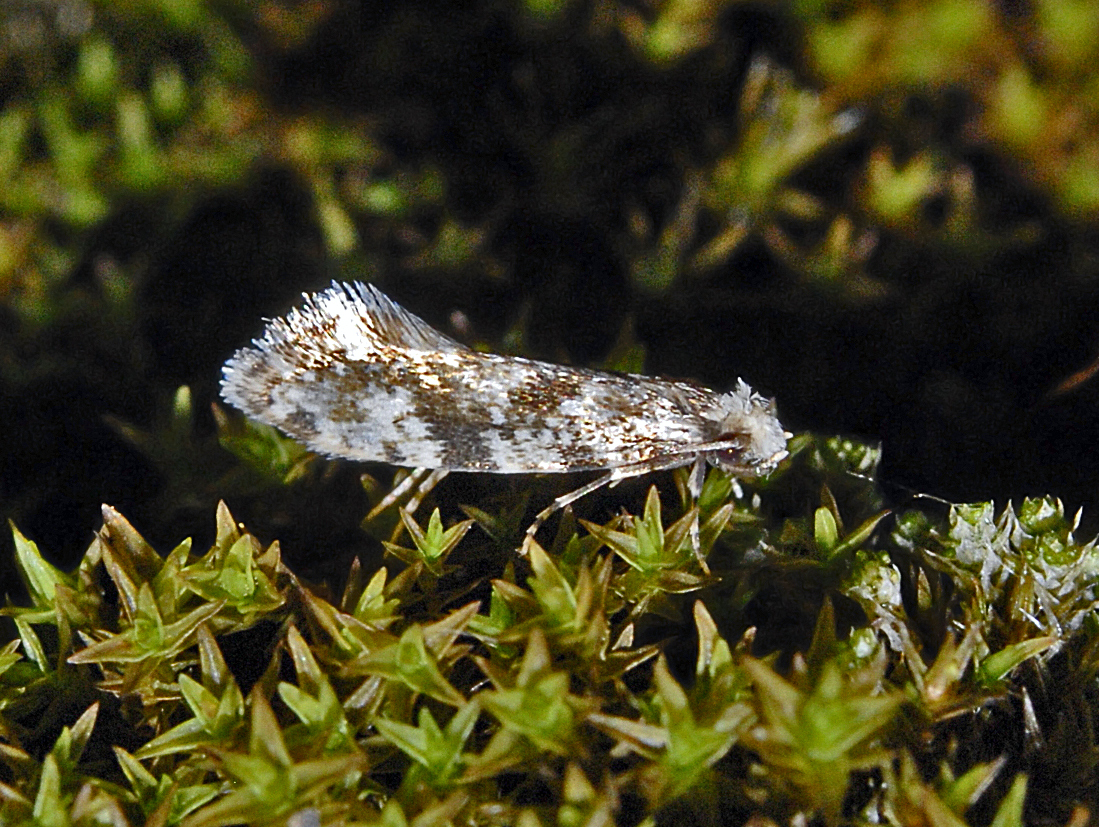
Nemapogon sp.
