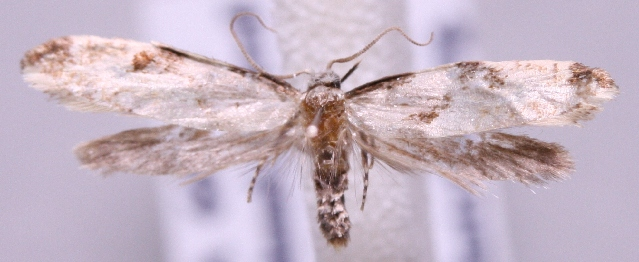

Scientific classification
- Kingdom: Animalia
- Phylum: Arthropoda
- Clade: Pancrustacea
- Class: Insecta
- Order: Lepidoptera
- Family: Tineidae
- Genus: Nemapogon
- Species: N. clematella

Binomial name
- Nemapogon clematella (Fabricius, 1781)

Synonyms
- Tinea clematella Fabricius, 1781; Nemapogon clematellus; Argyresthia auritinctella Wallengren, 1852; Recurvaria clematea Haworth, 1828; Alucita niveella Fabricius, 1777; Tinea punctella Scopoli, 1763; Tinea repandella Hübner, [1799]

= Nemapogon clematella =

Species of moth

Nemapogon clematella, the barred white clothes moth, is a moth of the family Tineidae. It is found in most of Europe and in North America, where it has been recorded from Maryland and North Carolina. The habitat consists of woodlands.

The wingspan is 12–15 mm. Adults are on wing from June to August.

The larvae feed on fungi, including Hypoxylon fuscum and Fomes fomentarius.
