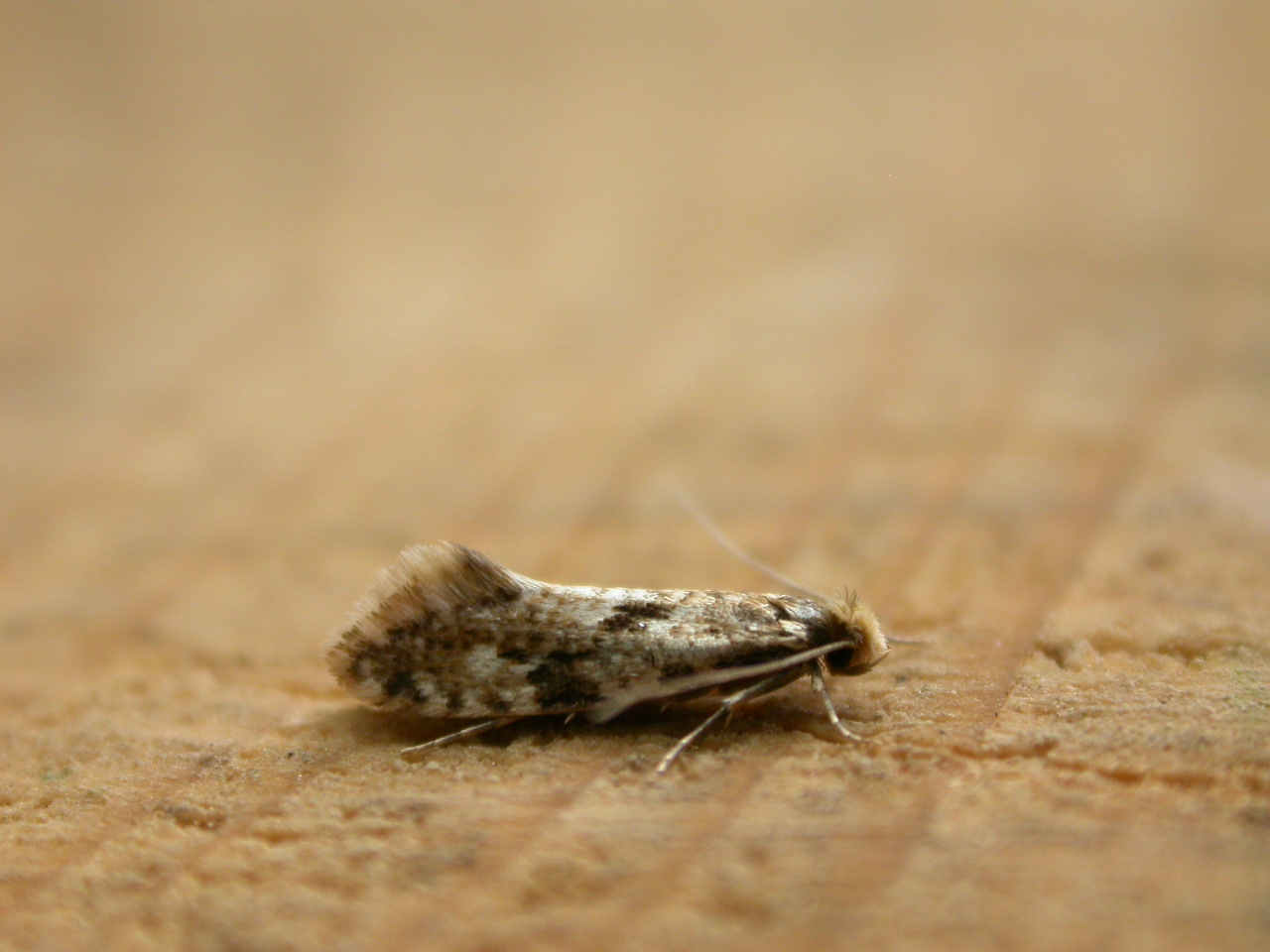

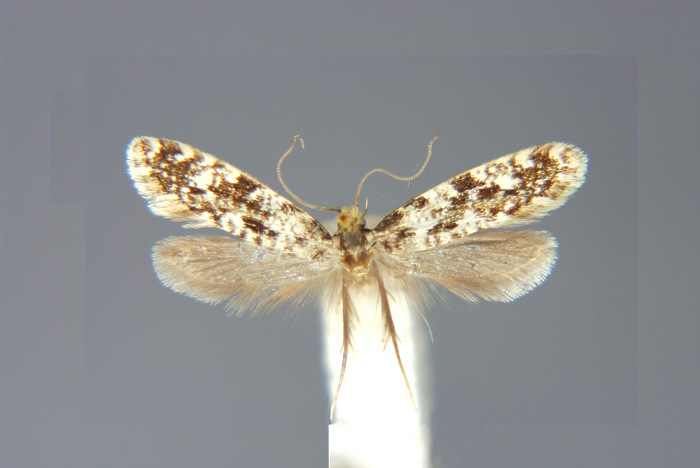

Scientific classification
- Kingdom: Animalia
- Phylum: Arthropoda
- Clade: Pancrustacea
- Class: Insecta
- Order: Lepidoptera
- Family: Tineidae
- Genus: Nemapogon
- Species: N. cloacella

Binomial name
- Nemapogon cloacella (Haworth, 1828)

Synonyms
- Nemapogon cloacellus (lapsus); Nemapogon infimella (Heydenreich, 1851); Tinea cloacella Haworth, 1828; Tinea infimella Heydenreich, 1851

= Nemapogon cloacella =

Cork moth

Species of moth

Nemapogon cloacella, the cork moth, is a species of tineoid moth. It belongs to the fungus moth family (Tineidae), and therein to the subfamily Nemapogoninae. Its junior synonym N. infimella was established by G.H. Heydenreich in the 1851 volume of his Lepidopterorum Europaeorum Catalogus Methodicus, but many sources still attribute it to G.A.W. Herrich-Schäffer, who supposedly narrowly beat Heidenreich in (re)describing the species. But as it seems, Herrich-Schäffer was merely one of the first to use the name proposed by Heydenreich, as the volume of his Systematische Bearbeitung der Schmetterlinge von Europa where he discussed the cork moth was not published until 1853 or 1854. That all nonwithstanding, the species had been already validly described by A.H. Haworth in the 1828 volume of Lepidoptera Britannica.

== Description ==
This small moth has a wingspan of 10–18 mm. The forewings are irregularly mottled black, brown, white and grey, resembling close relatives such as the European corn moth (N. granella). The head has a tuft of pale yellow hairs. The antennae are wire-shaped and about two-thirds as long as the front wings. The thorax is grey. The wing fringes on the forewing are alternately grey and white. The hind wings are dark grey-brown. The larva is white to pink with a reddish-brown head. The neck plate is also reddish-brown.

== Distribution and ecology ==
Nemapogon cloacella is a widespread species, found all across the western Palearctic and North America, where it has recently been recorded from British Columbia. It is reportedly absent from France, but given that it occurs in all surrounding countries, this is unlikely to be correct. Its preferred habitat is woodland with a large amount of dead trees. The crepuscular adults are on the wing throughout the summer and are typically encountered at dusk but sometimes can be seen earlier in the day.

== Biology ==
The caterpillars feed mainly on bracket fungi. Their food spectrum has been subject to considerable dispute in the past due to confusion with the European corn moth. Some claimed that N. cloacella caterpillars eat a wide range of food – dried fruit and mushrooms, seeds and other vegetable material, e.g. cereal grains, Capsicum annuum fruit, poppyseed (Papaver somniferum), bitter almonds (Prunus amygdalus amara) or bilberries (Vaccinium), but even cork (hence its common name) and beeswax. Other authors stated that they were only found on the oak mazegill fungus (Daedalea quercina), and ascribed the wide range of foodstuffs to N. granella. But as it seems, neither extreme was correct; the caterpillars do eat preferentially fungi – not only the oak mazegill but also others (e.g. birch polypore, Piptoporus betulinus) – feeding on plant debris and similar materials when their favorite food is not available.
