= Nemophora albiciliellus =

Scientific classification
- Kingdom: Animalia
- Phylum: Arthropoda
- Class: Insecta
- Order: Lepidoptera
- Family: Adelidae
- Genus: Nemophora
- Species: N. albiciliellus

Binomial name
- Nemophora albiciliellus (Staudinger, 1859)

Synonyms
- Nemotois albiciliellus Staudinger, 1859; Nemotois beryllopa Meyrick, 1935

Species of moth

Nemophora albiciliellus is a moth of the family Adelidae. It is found in Spain.

The wingspan is 14-16.5 mm.

== Taxonomy ==
This species was previously considered a synonym of Nemophora barbatellus.
