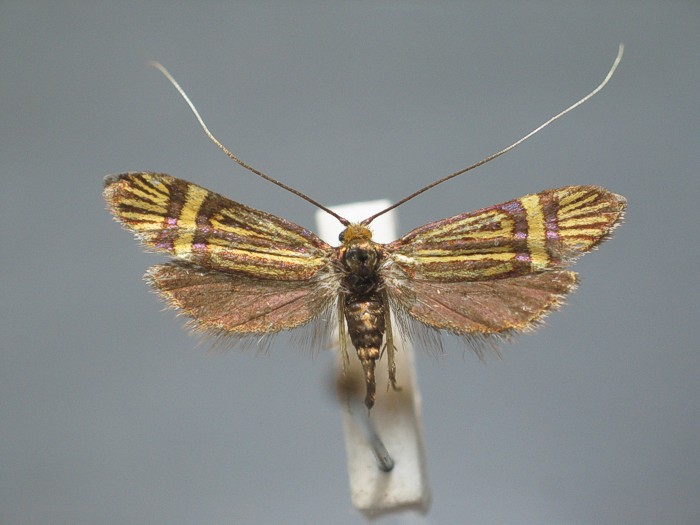
- Museum specimen

Scientific classification
- Kingdom: Animalia
- Phylum: Arthropoda
- Class: Insecta
- Order: Lepidoptera
- Family: Adelidae
- Genus: Nemophora
- Species: N. congruella

Binomial name
- Nemophora congruella (Zeller, 1839)

Synonyms
- Adela congruella Zeller, 1839

= Nemophora congruella =

Species of moth

Nemophora congruella is a species of moth in the family Adelidae.

== Distribution ==
This infrequent transpalaearctic species is present from France and Belgium to Poland and Romania and from Denmark to Italy. It is also present in Russia.

== Habitat ==
These moths live in mountain regions with deciduous and coniferous trees.

== Description ==
The wingspan of Nemophora congruella can reach 15–17 millimetres (0.59–0.67 in). The head is dark brown, with dark yellow hair-like scales. The males have filiform antennae 2.5 times longer than the front wing length, while the females have much shorter antennae. The thorax has a bronzy golden sheen. The dominant colour of the forewings is shiny golden yellow-orange, with longitudinal violet black streaks.

Forewings have a broad transversal yellow fascia across the whole width of the wings at about 2/3 of forewing length. This central band is framed by two lead-gray bands with a black border. These two bands are nearly as broad as the central yellow part. The basal part of the wings has three longitudinal lead-gray, blueish-violet shining stripes reaching the transversal fascia. Rear wings are brownish gray.

Nemophora congruella is very similar to Nemophora degeerella and Nemophora amatella, but in these two species the dominant forewing colour is dark, while Nemophora congruella shows lighter colours. The forewing fascia in N. congruella is located closer to the base. Nemophora congruella is slightly smaller and the forewings markings are bright yellow instead of almost leather-brown. The cross-fascia is more straight.

== Biology ==
The adults fly from early May till June. The larvae feed on Picea abies.

== Bibliography ==
- Kozlov, M. V. (2003): Annotated checklist of the European species of Nemophora (Adelidae) - Nota Lepidopterologica 26 (3/4): 115-126
- Zeller, P. C. (1839): Versuch einer naturgemäßen Eintheilung der Schaben - Isis von Oken 1839 (3): 167-220. Leipzig (Brockhaus).
