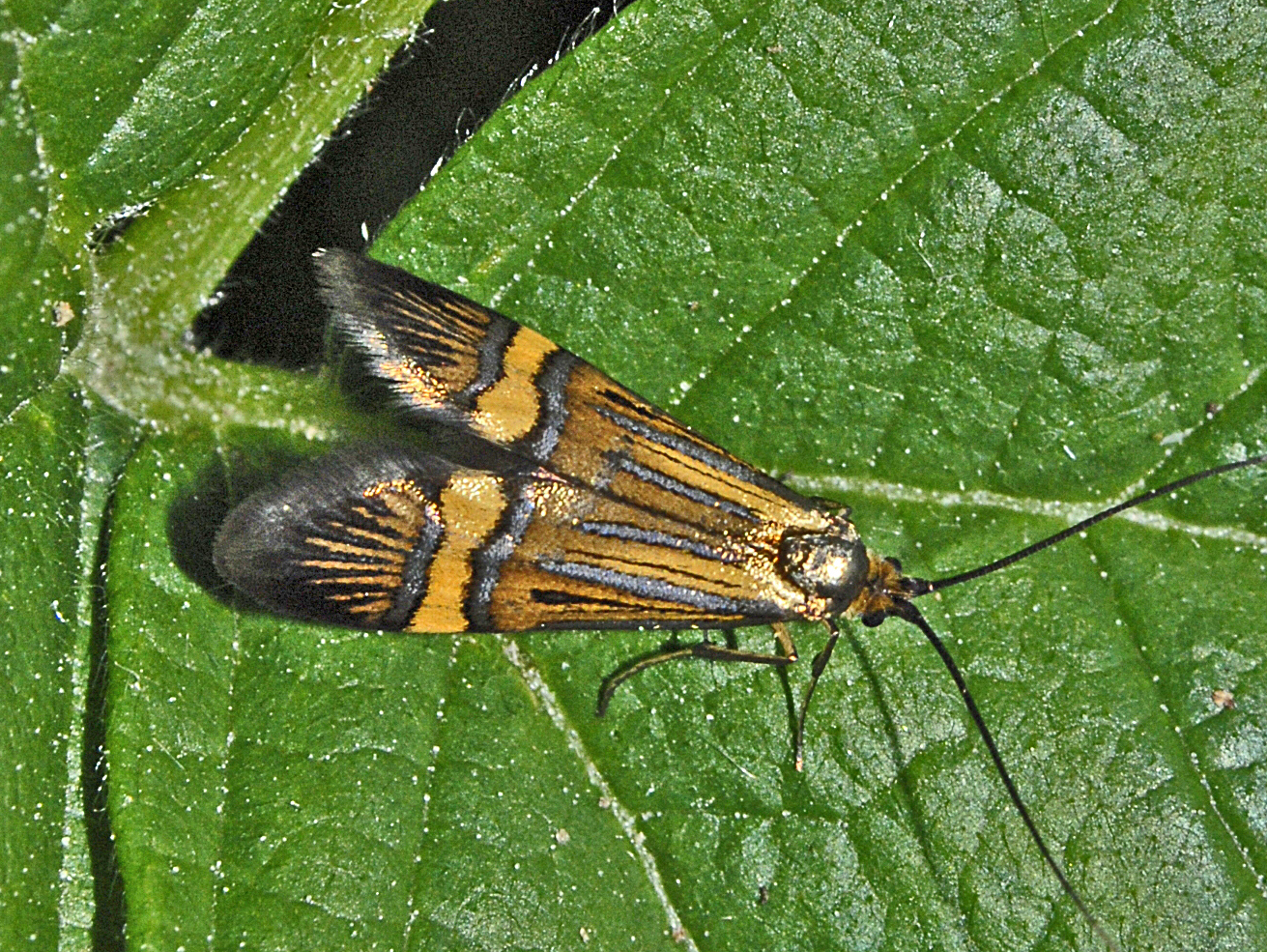
- Nemophora degeerella, male
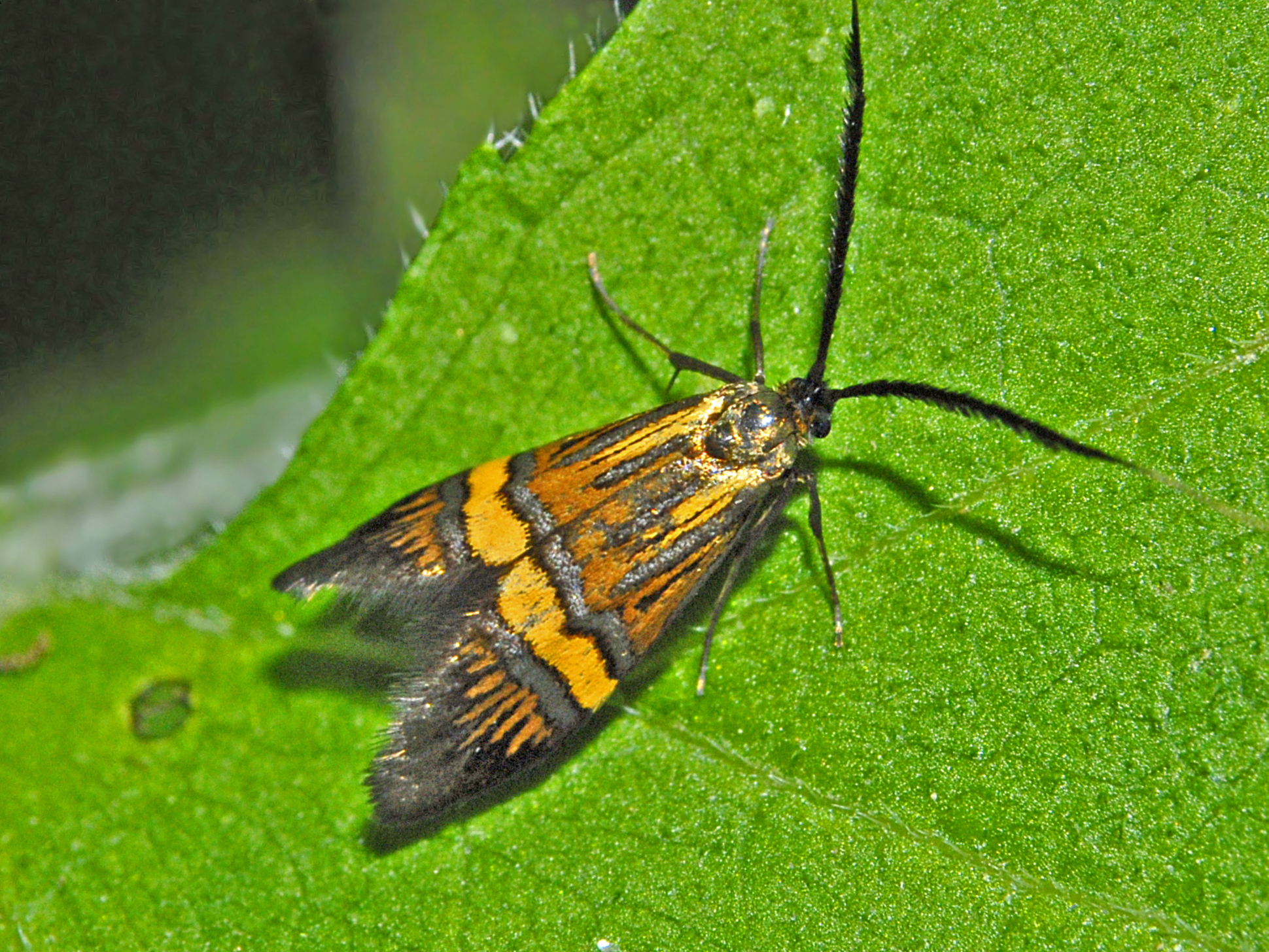
- Nemophora degeerella, female

Scientific classification
- Kingdom: Animalia
- Phylum: Arthropoda
- Clade: Pancrustacea
- Class: Insecta
- Order: Lepidoptera
- Family: Adelidae
- Genus: Nemophora
- Species: N. degeerella

Binomial name
- Nemophora degeerella (Linnaeus, 1758)

Synonyms
- Phalaena (Tinea) degeerella Linnaeus, 1758

= Longhorn moth =

Species of moth

The longhorn moth or yellow-barred long-horn (Nemophora degeerella) is a diurnal lepidopteran from the moths family Adelidae (fairy longhorn moths).

== Distribution and habitat ==
This species is present on most of Europe, but it is fairly common in north west Europe. The habitat of these moths is damp deciduous forests with wooded lanes and hedgerows.

== Description ==
The wingspan of Nemophora degeerella ranges from 18–20 millimetres (0.71–0.79 in) in males, from 15–18 millimetres (0.59–0.71 in) in females. The head is dark brown, with dark and yellow hair-like scales. The thorax has a bronzy golden shining. Forewings are shiny bronzy golden yellow or shiny ochreous with longitudinal dark brown and lead-gray blueish-violet shining streaks. A yellow transversal band cross the whole forewings, framed by two lead-gray blueish-violet shining stripes with a dark brown border. The three longitudinal lead-gray, blueish-violet shining stripes situated in the basal part of the wings do not treach the transversal fascia. Rear wings are brownish gray. The longhorn moth males have filiform antennae ranging up to five times their body length, while the female has much shorter antennae. Moreover in the females the basal part of the antennae is thickened by black scales, while the tip is white.

Nemophora degeerella is very similar to Nemophora congruella but N. congruella is slightly smaller, the forewing markings are bright yellow and the band is located closer to the base. In the females of N. congruella, it is missing the beard-like scales present in the basal part of the antennae of the females of N. degeerella. Also, Adela croesella is very similar, but it is much smaller and more colorful. The gray blueish-violet stripes are at least as wide as the yellow central band.

== Biology ==
These moths fly in the day. The flight period ranges from May to July. The caterpillar feeds on birch leaf litter. The adult moth feeds on Persicaria bistorta, Leucanthemum vulgare and nettles. This species has a single annual generation (univoltine). Hibernation takes place in the form larvae in a cocoon of leaves.

== Etymology ==
The specific epithet honours Charles De Geer.

== Gallery ==
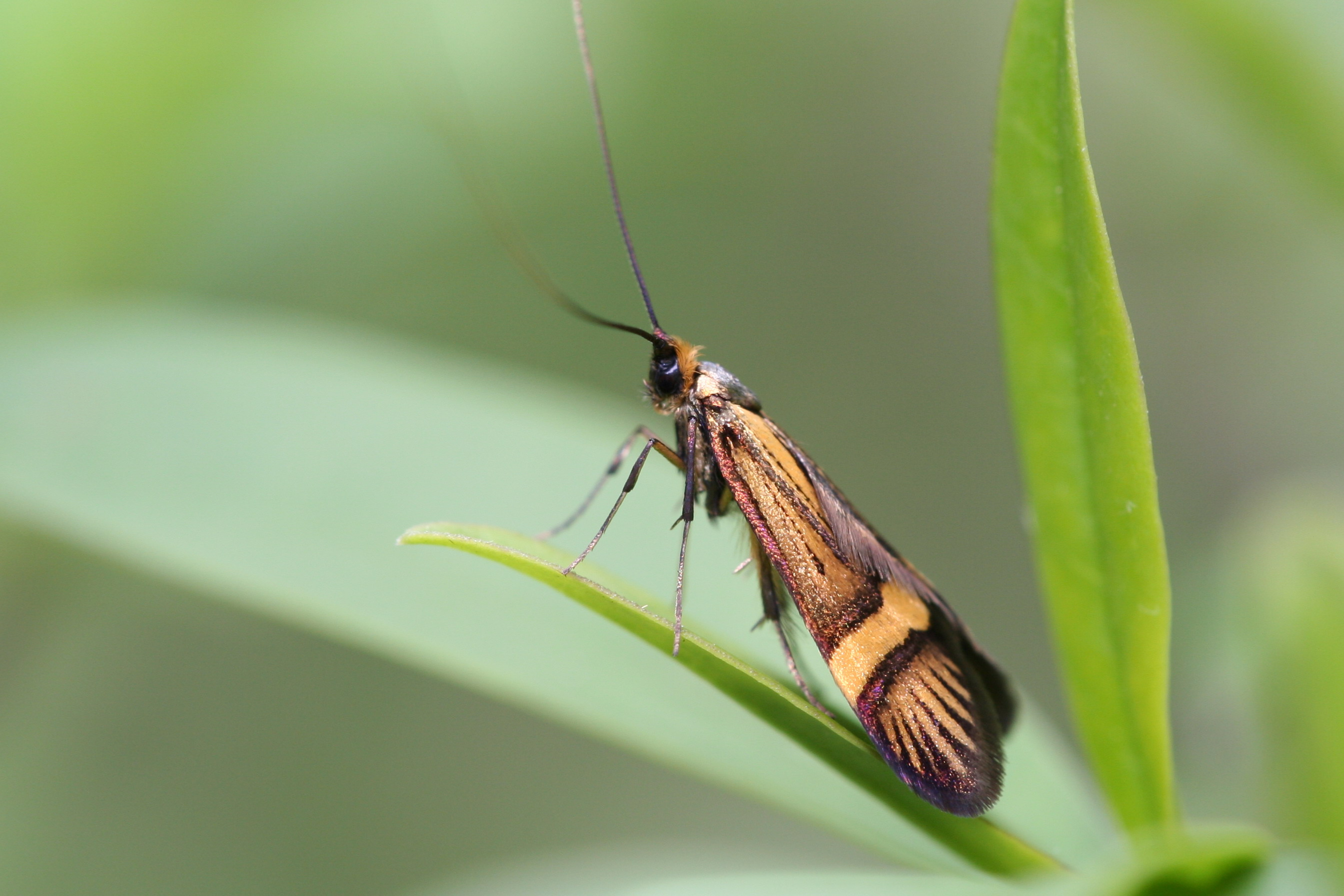
Lateral view

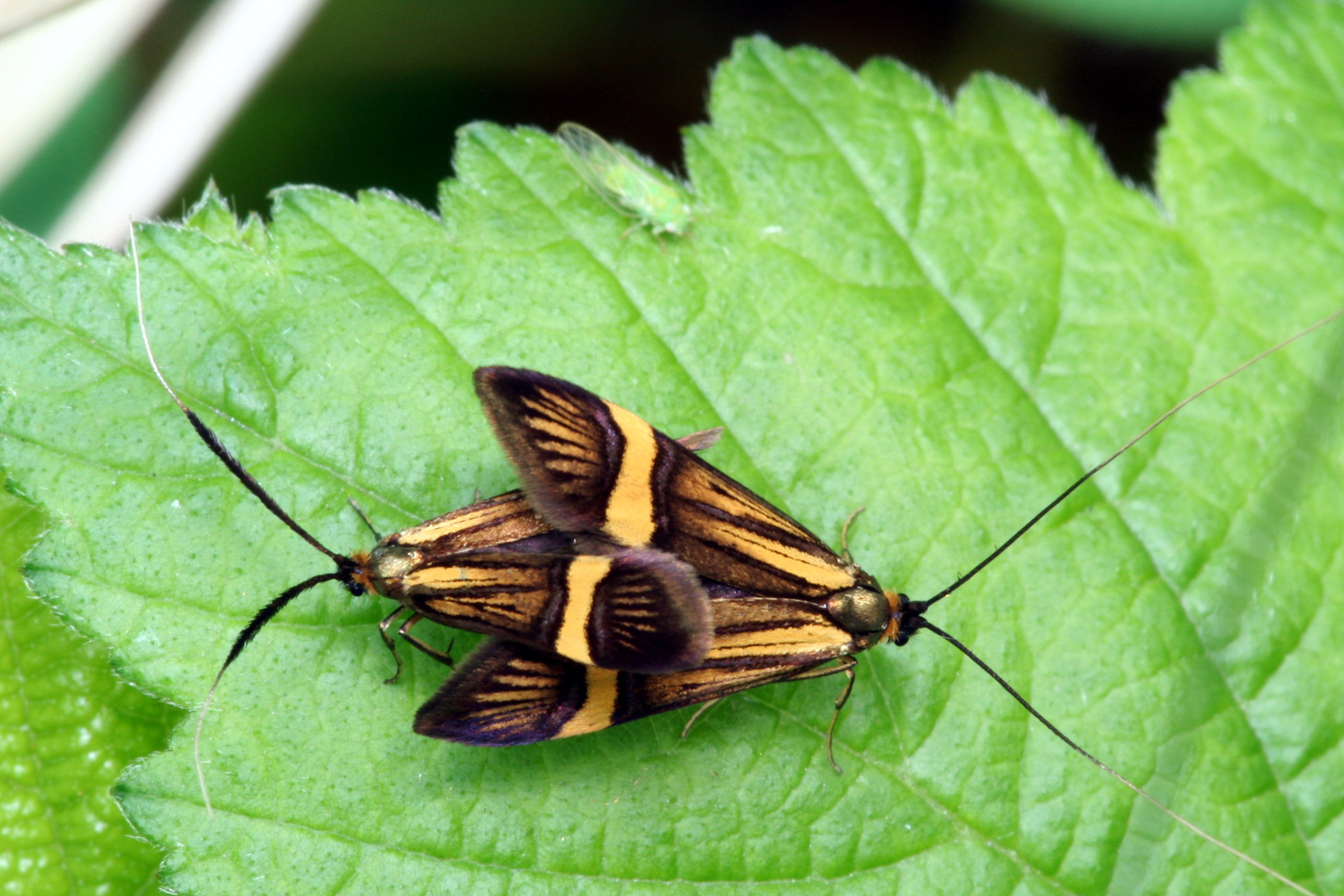
Mating pair

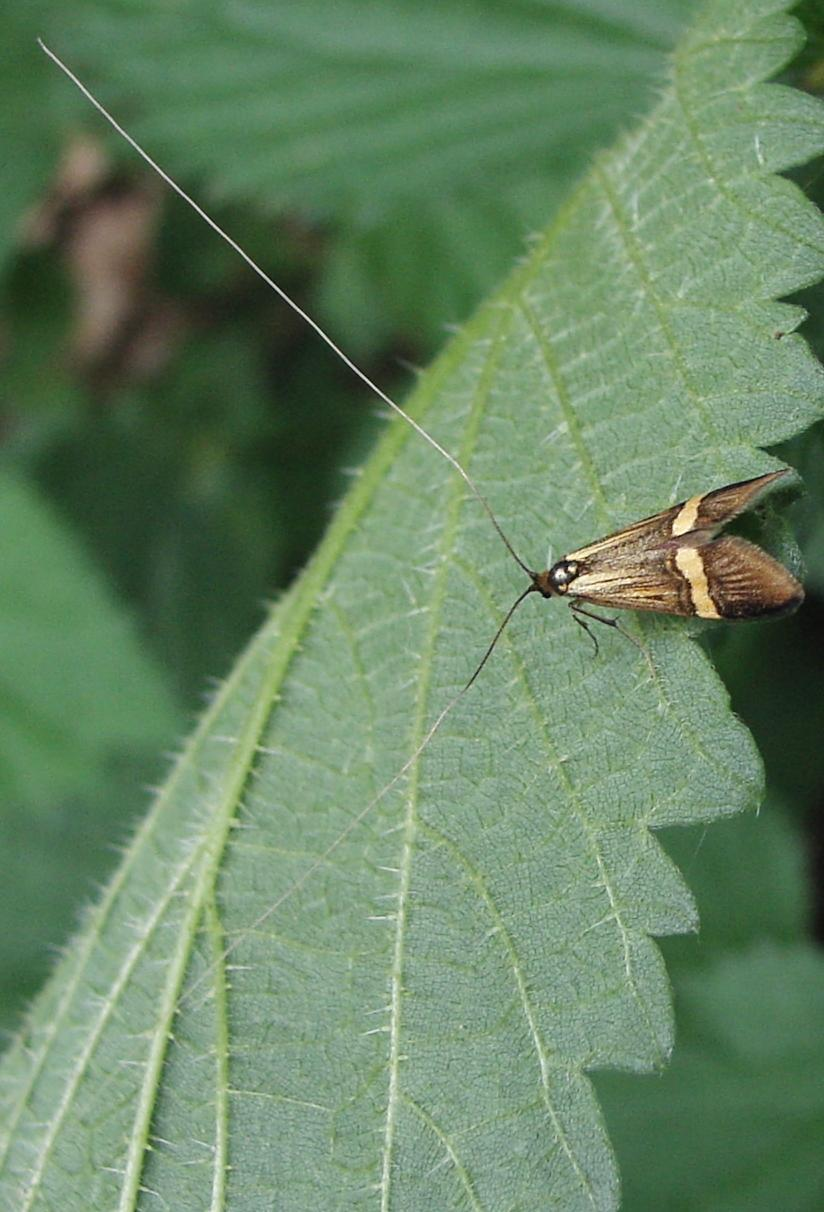
Male with its long filiform antennae

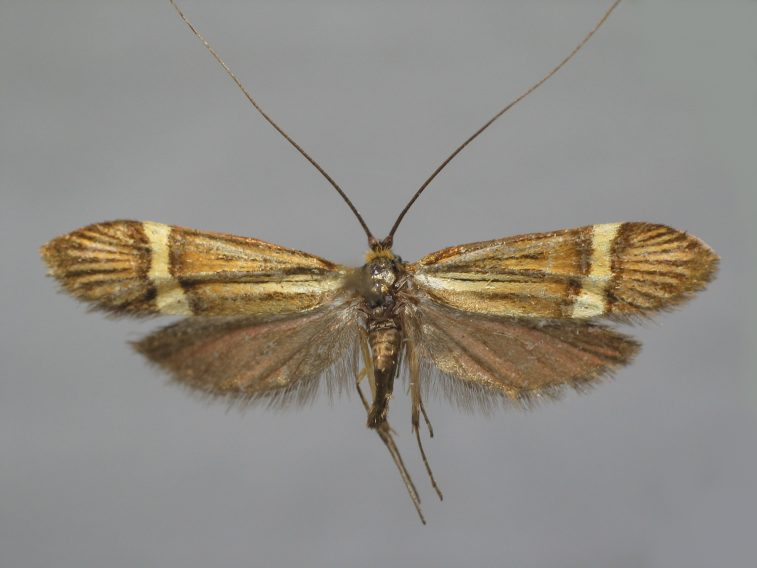
Museum specimen

== Bibliography ==
- Kozlov, Mikhail V. (2003). "Annotated checklist of the European species of Nemophora (Adelidae)". Nota Lepidopterologica. 26 (3/4): 115–126.
- L.N. Perette, F. Spill et M. Rauch, Les Papillons de la Réserve de la Biosphère des Vosges du Nord, Eguelshardt, Cicogna, 33
- Linnaeus, C. 1758. Systema Naturae, Ed. X. (Systema naturae per regna tria naturae, secundum classes, ordines, genera, species, cum characteribus, differentiis, synonymis, locis. Tomus I. Editio decima, reformata.) Holmiae. Systema Nat. ed. 10 i-ii + 1-824.
- Robinson, Gaden S.; Nielsen, Ebbe Schmidt (1983). "The Microlepidoptera described by Linnaeus and Clerck". Systematic Entomology. 8 (2): 191–242. Bibcode:1983SysEn...8..191R. doi:10.1111/j.1365-3113.1983.tb00479.x. S2CID 84148810.
- Küppers, P. V. 1980. Untersuchungen zur Taxonomie und Phylogenie der Westpaläarktischen Adelinae (Lepidoptera: Adelidae), Dissertation, Wissenschaftliche Beiträge Karlsruhe, Verlag M.Wahl, Karlsruhe.
- Kurz, M. A. & M. E. Kurz 2000–2010. Naturkundliches Informationssystem.
