= Nemophora askoldella =

Scientific classification
- Kingdom: Animalia
- Phylum: Arthropoda
- Class: Insecta
- Order: Lepidoptera
- Family: Adelidae
- Genus: Nemophora
- Species: N. askoldella

Binomial name
- Nemophora askoldella (Millière, 1879)

Synonyms
- Nemophora irroratella Christoph, 1882; Nemotois niphites Meyrick, 1938; Nemophora niphites

Species of moth

Nemophora askoldella is a moth of the family Adelidae or fairy longhorn moths. It was described by Pierre Millière in 1879. It is found in China, South Korea, Japan and the Khabarovsk and Primorye regions of the Russian Far East.
