= Nemophora divina =

Scientific classification
- Kingdom: Animalia
- Phylum: Arthropoda
- Class: Insecta
- Order: Lepidoptera
- Family: Adelidae
- Genus: Nemophora
- Species: N. divina

Binomial name
- Nemophora divina (Caradja, 1939)

Synonyms
- Nemotois divina Caradja, 1939

Species of moth

Nemophora divina is a moth of the Adelidae family. It is found in continental China.
