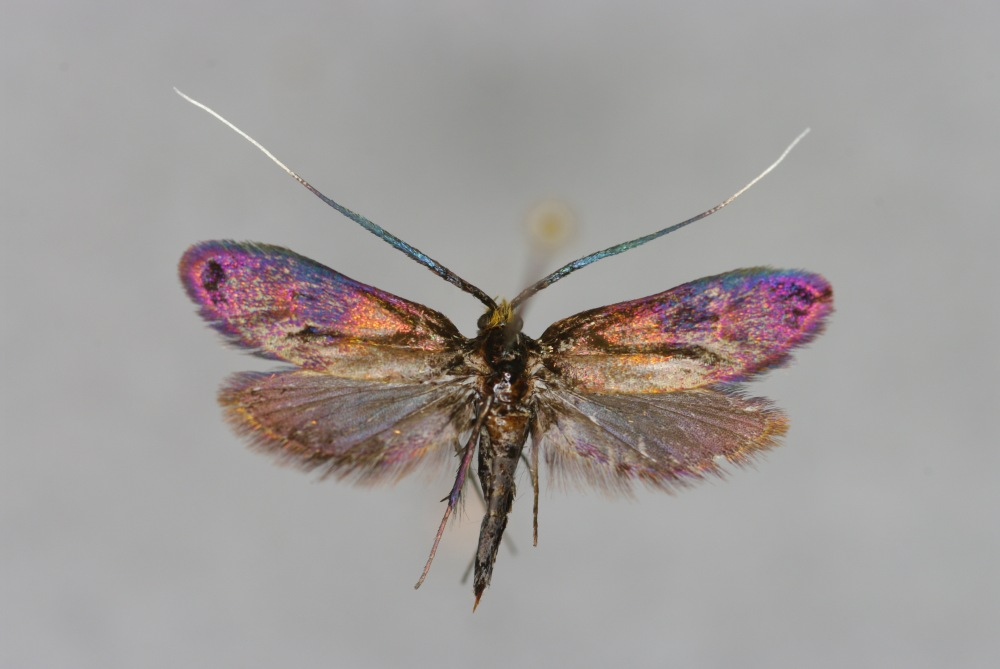

Scientific classification
- Kingdom: Animalia
- Phylum: Arthropoda
- Class: Insecta
- Order: Lepidoptera
- Family: Adelidae
- Genus: Nemophora
- Species: N. istrianellus

Binomial name
- Nemophora istrianellus (Heydenreich, 1851)

Synonyms
- Nemotois istrianellus Heydenreich, 1851; Nemophora istrianella; Adela beyruthella Bruand, 1858; Nemotois cupriacellus var. dalmatinellus Zeller, 1853; Nemotois chlorista Meyrick, 1912

= Nemophora istrianellus =

Species of moth

Nemophora istrianellus is a moth of the Adelidae family. It is found in Spain, Austria, Croatia, Bosnia and Herzegovina, Asia Minor and Israel.
