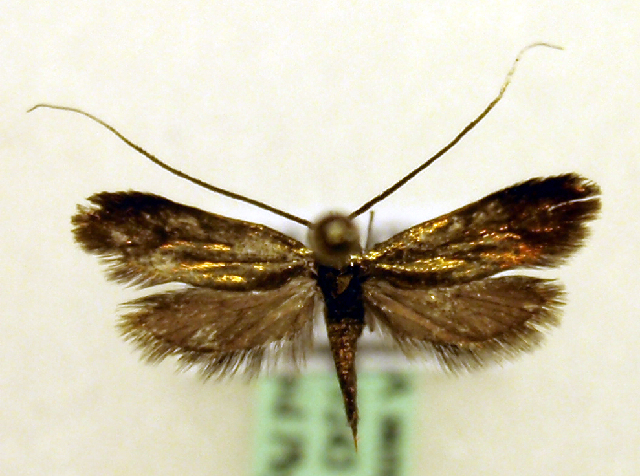

Scientific classification
- Kingdom: Animalia
- Phylum: Arthropoda
- Clade: Pancrustacea
- Class: Insecta
- Order: Lepidoptera
- Family: Adelidae
- Genus: Nemophora
- Species: N. cupriacella

Binomial name
- Nemophora cupriacella (Hübner, 1819)

Synonyms
- Tinea cupriacella Hübner, 1819

= Nemophora cupriacella =

Species of moth

Nemophora cupriacella is a moth of the family Adelidae that is found in most of Europe.

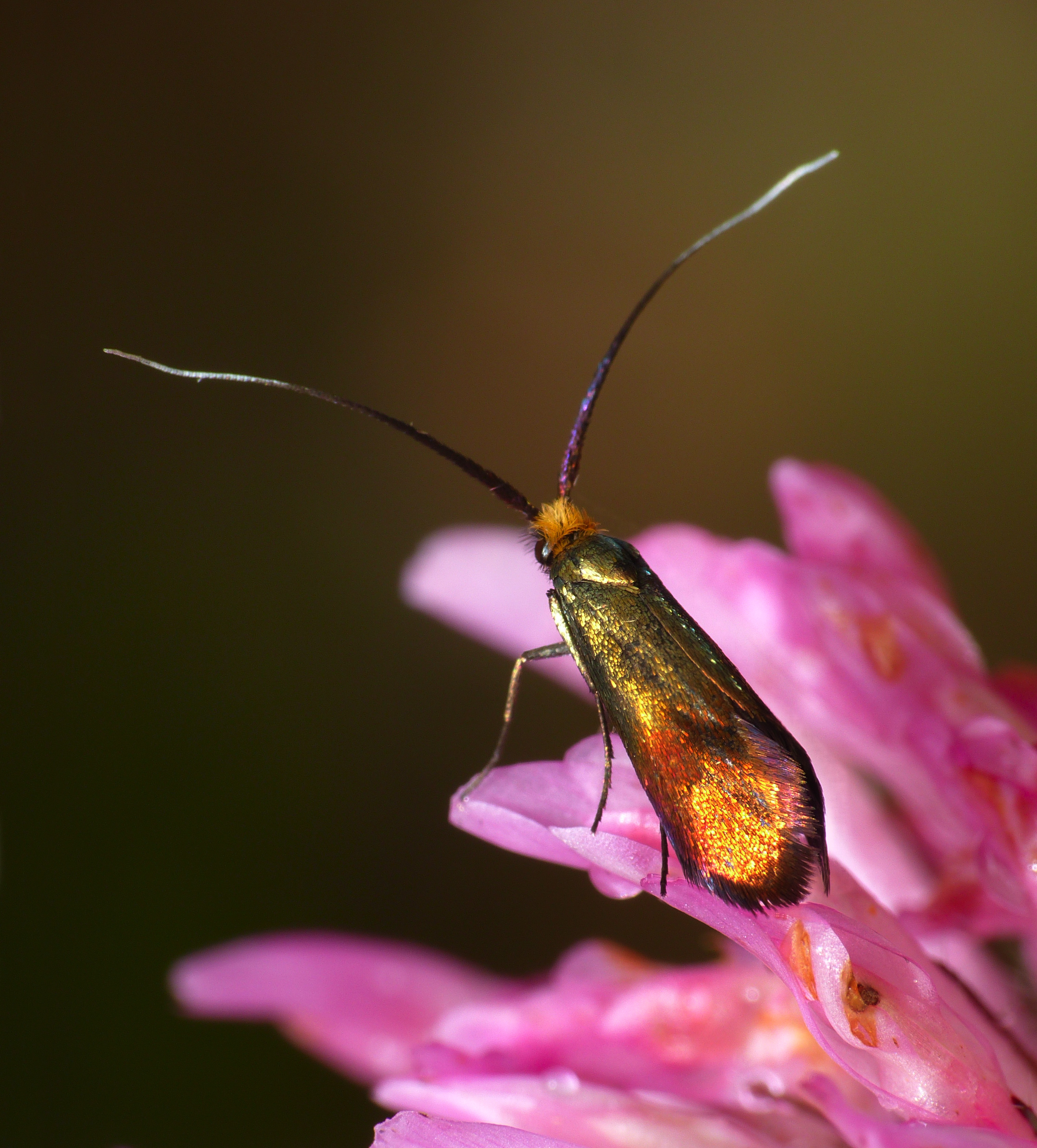
female

The wingspan is 12–16 millimetres (0.47–0.63 in). The head is ferruginous, forehead in male black. The antennae in male with basal l/8 clothed with rough scales above, in female gradually thickened towards base. The forewings are shining golden - bronze, usually more coppery posteriorly with sometimes a faintly indicated darker postmedian fascia. Hindwings dark purplish-fuscous.

Adults are on wing from the end of June to July.

The larvae feed on Knautia, Succisa and Scabiosa species.
