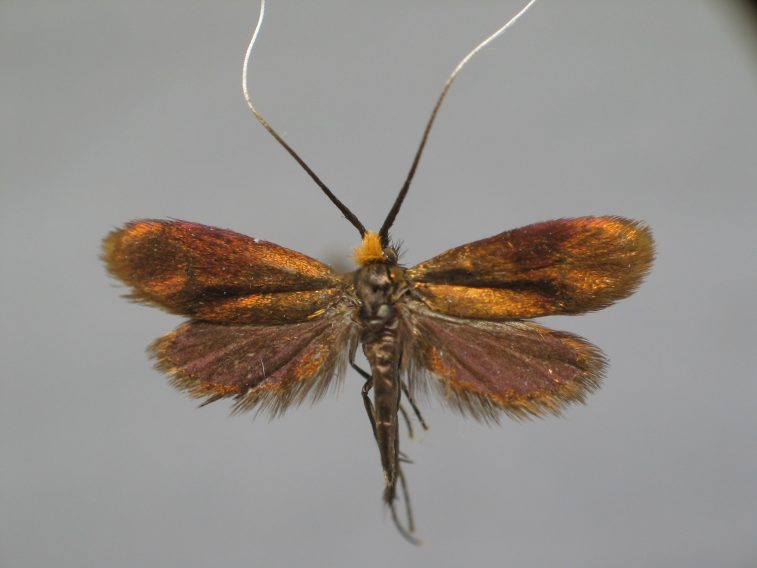

Scientific classification
- Kingdom: Animalia
- Phylum: Arthropoda
- Clade: Pancrustacea
- Class: Insecta
- Order: Lepidoptera
- Family: Adelidae
- Genus: Nemophora
- Species: N. violellus

Binomial name
- Nemophora violellus (Stainton, 1851)

Synonyms
- Nemotois violellus Stainton, 1851; Adela violaria Razowski, 1978

= Nemophora violellus =

Species of moth

Nemophora violellus is a moth of the Adelidae family. It is found in most of Europe, except Ireland, Great Britain, Belgium, part of the Balkan Peninsula, Fennoscandia and the Baltic region.

The wingspan is 10–11 millimetres (0.39–0.43 in). They are on wing in July.

The larvae feed on Gentiana asclepiadea, Gentiana pneumonanthe and Gentiana cruciata.
