= Nemophora lapikiella =

Scientific classification
- Kingdom: Animalia
- Phylum: Arthropoda
- Class: Insecta
- Order: Lepidoptera
- Family: Adelidae
- Genus: Nemophora
- Species: N. lapikiella

Binomial name
- Nemophora lapikiella Kozlov, 1997

Synonyms
- Nemophora lapikella

Species of moth

Nemophora lapikiella is a moth of the Adelidae family or fairy longhorn moths. It was described by Kozlov in 1997. It is found in the Russian Far East and Japan.
