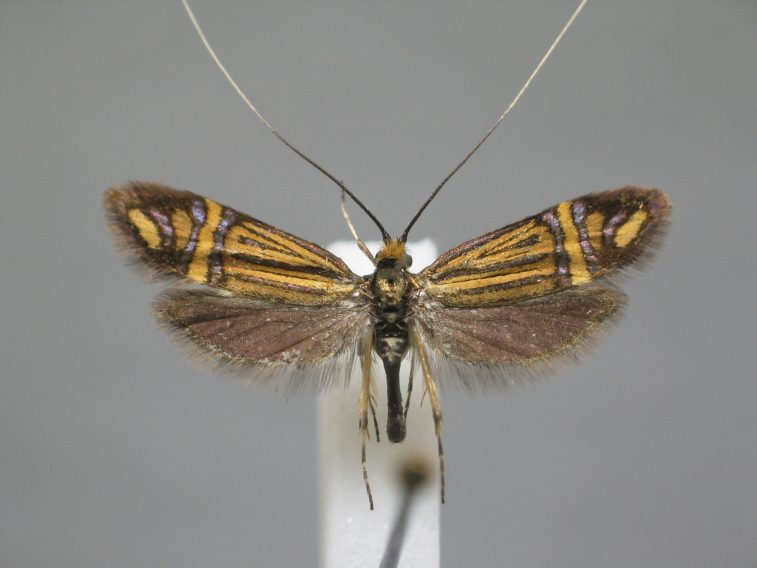

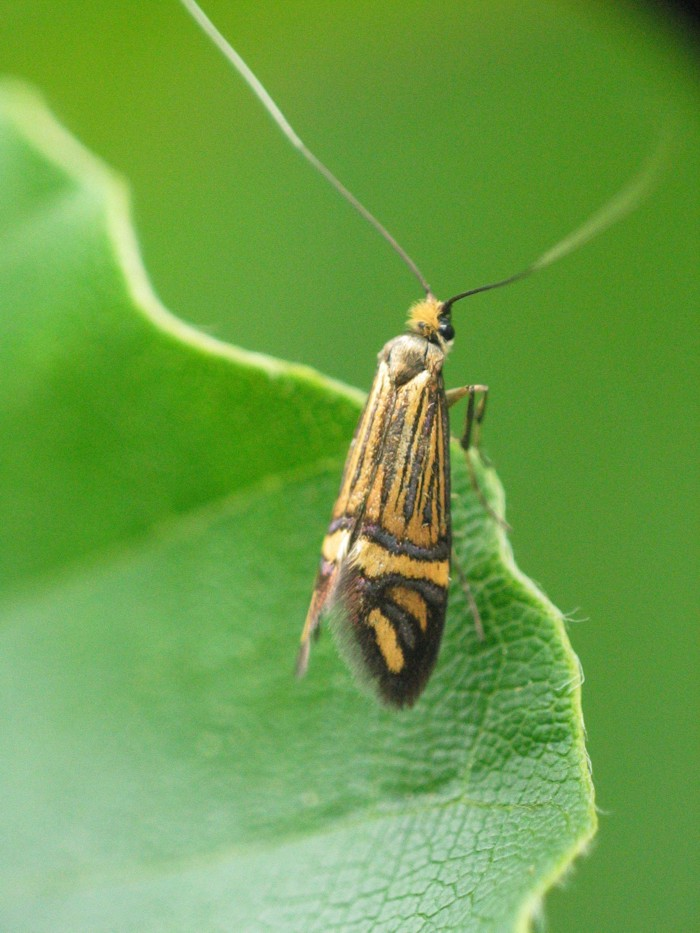
- Male

Scientific classification
- Kingdom: Animalia
- Phylum: Arthropoda
- Class: Insecta
- Order: Lepidoptera
- Family: Adelidae
- Genus: Nemophora
- Species: N. ochsenheimerella

Binomial name
- Nemophora ochsenheimerella (Hübner, 1813)

Synonyms
- Tinea ochsenheimerella Hübner, 1813; Nemotois chibiana Matsumura, 1931; Nemophora japanalpina Yasuda, 1957

= Nemophora ochsenheimerella =

Species of moth

Nemophora ochsenheimerella is a moth of the family Adelidae. It is a trans-Palearctic species, which is also found in Central Europe.

The wingspan is about 15 millimetres (0.59 in). The moth flies in one generation from late April to June.

== Notes ==
1. The flight season refers to Belgium and The Netherlands. This may vary in other parts of the range.
