= Nemophora sylvatica =

Scientific classification
- Kingdom: Animalia
- Phylum: Arthropoda
- Class: Insecta
- Order: Lepidoptera
- Family: Adelidae
- Genus: Nemophora
- Species: N. sylvatica

Binomial name
- Nemophora sylvatica Hirowatari, 1995

Species of moth

Nemophora sylvatica is a moth of the Adelidae family or fairy longhorn moths. It was assessed by Hirowatari in 1995. It is found on the Kuriles and in the Russian Far East and Japan (including Hokkaido, Honshu and Shikoku).

The wingspan is 12–14 mm.
