= Nemophora staudingerella =

Scientific classification
- Kingdom: Animalia
- Phylum: Arthropoda
- Class: Insecta
- Order: Lepidoptera
- Family: Adelidae
- Genus: Nemophora
- Species: N. staudingerella

Binomial name
- Nemophora staudingerella Christoph, 1881

Species of moth

Nemophora staudingerella is a moth of the family Adelidae or fairy longhorn moths. It was described by Hugo Theodor Christoph in 1881. It is found in the Russian Far East and Japan.

The wingspan is 17–20 mm.
