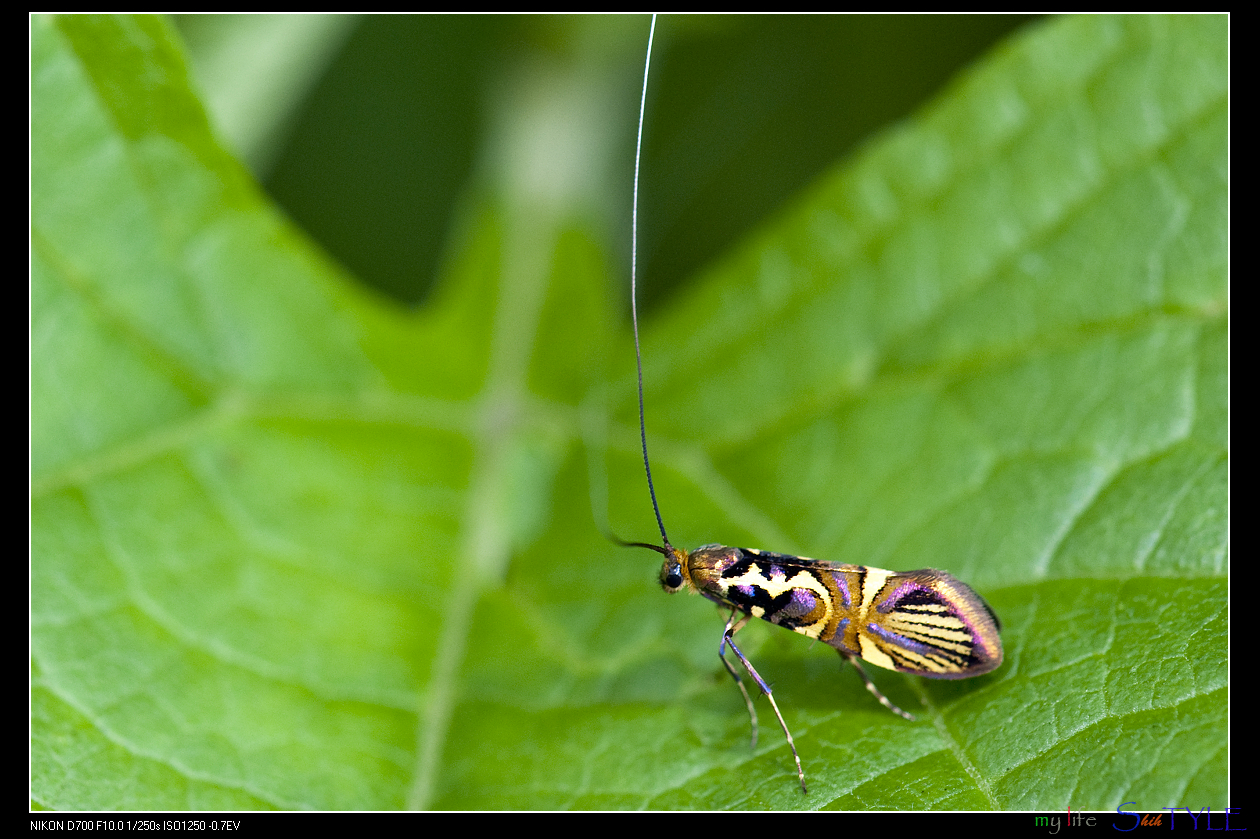

Scientific classification
- Kingdom: Animalia
- Phylum: Arthropoda
- Class: Insecta
- Order: Lepidoptera
- Family: Adelidae
- Genus: Nemophora
- Species: N. magnifica

Binomial name
- Nemophora magnifica Kozlov, 1997

= Nemophora magnifica =

Species of moth

Nemophora magnifica is a moth of the Adelidae family. It is found in Taiwan.
