= Nemophora parvella =

Scientific classification
- Kingdom: Animalia
- Phylum: Arthropoda
- Class: Insecta
- Order: Lepidoptera
- Family: Adelidae
- Genus: Nemophora
- Species: N. parvella

Binomial name
- Nemophora parvella (Walker, 1863)

Synonyms
- Nematois parvella Walker, 1863

Species of moth

Nemophora parvella is a species of moth of the family Adelidae. It is known from the Republic of Congo and Sierra Leone.
