= Nemophora humilis =

Scientific classification
- Kingdom: Animalia
- Phylum: Arthropoda
- Class: Insecta
- Order: Lepidoptera
- Family: Adelidae
- Genus: Nemophora
- Species: N. humilis

Binomial name
- Nemophora humilis (Walsingham, 1891)

Synonyms
- Nemotois humilis Walsingham, 1891

Species of moth

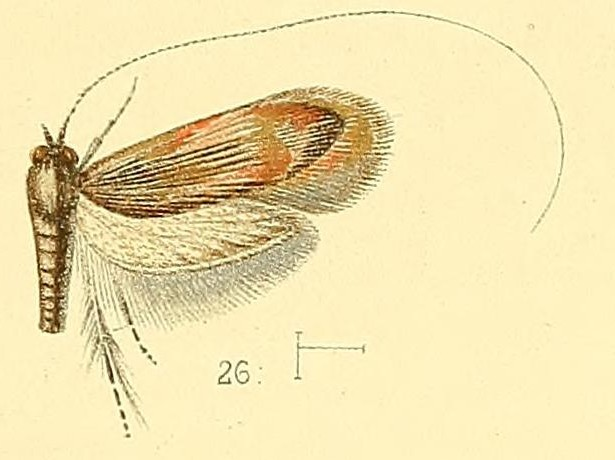
Nemophora humilis

Nemophora humilis is a species of moth of the Adelidae family that is known from Mozambique.
