= Nemophora pfeifferella =

Scientific classification
- Kingdom: Animalia
- Phylum: Arthropoda
- Clade: Pancrustacea
- Class: Insecta
- Order: Lepidoptera
- Family: Adelidae
- Genus: Nemophora
- Species: N. pfeifferella

Binomial name
- Nemophora pfeifferella (Hübner, 1813)

Synonyms
- Tinea pfeifferella Hübner, 1813; Adela chrysochraon Razowski, 1978; Adela huebneri Koçak, 1980

Species of moth

Nemophora pfeifferella is a moth of the Adelidae family. It is found from France to Russia and from Germany and Poland to Bosnia and Herzegovina and Bulgaria.
