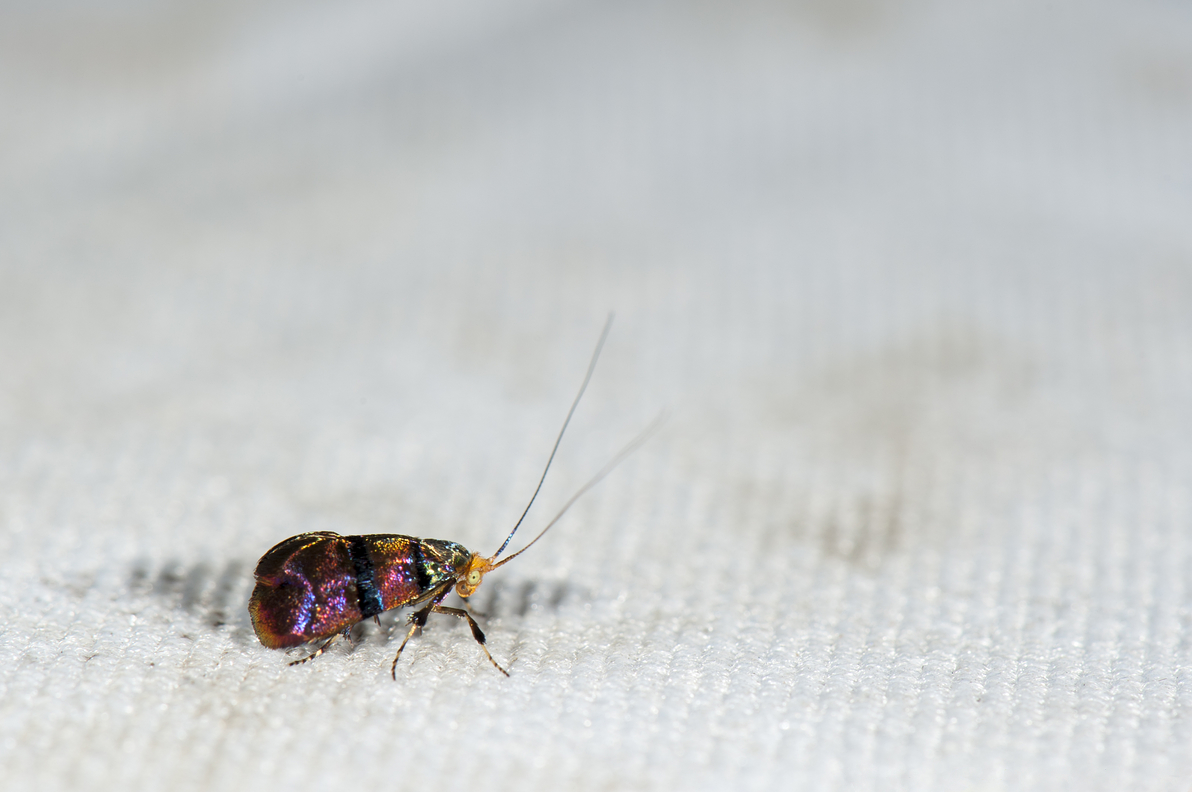

Scientific classification
- Kingdom: Animalia
- Phylum: Arthropoda
- Class: Insecta
- Order: Lepidoptera
- Family: Adelidae
- Genus: Nemophora
- Species: N. ahenea

Binomial name
- Nemophora ahenea Stringer, 1930

= Nemophora ahenea =

Species of moth

Nemophora ahenea is a moth of the Adelidae family. It is found in Japan and Taiwan.

The wingspan is 10–13 mm.
