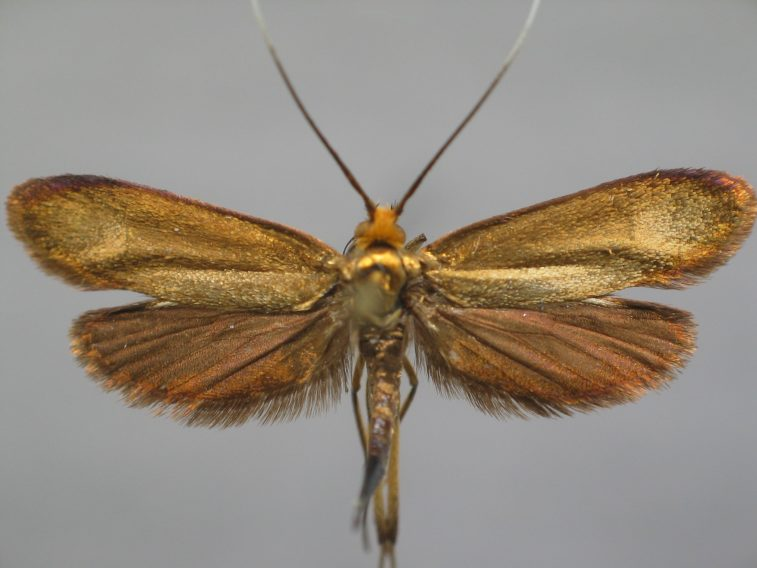

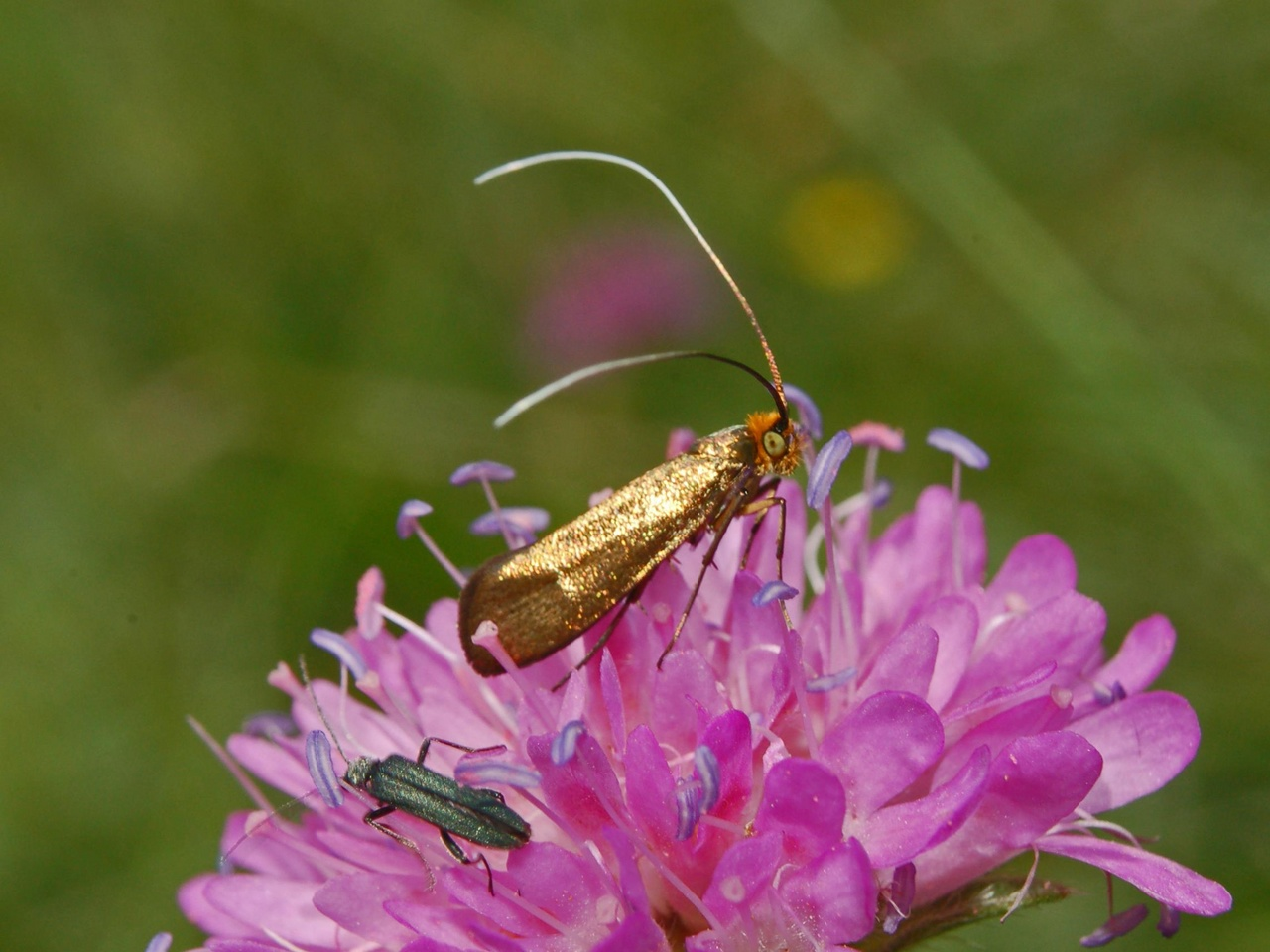

Scientific classification
- Kingdom: Animalia
- Phylum: Arthropoda
- Class: Insecta
- Order: Lepidoptera
- Family: Adelidae
- Genus: Nemophora
- Species: N. metallica

Binomial name
- Nemophora metallica Poda, 1759

Synonyms
- Phalaena metallica Poda, 1761; Phalaena scabiosella Scopoli, 1763; Nemotois aerosellus Zeller, 1850; Nemotois rebelellus Turati, 1924

= Nemophora metallica =

Species of moth

Nemophora metallica is a moth of the family Adelidae. It is found in Europe.

Its wingspan is 15–20 mm. The moth flies from late June to August depending on the location.

The larvae feed on Knautia arvensis and Scabiosa columbaria.

== Gallery ==
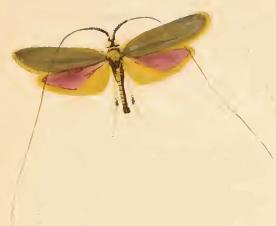

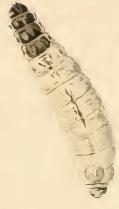
Larva

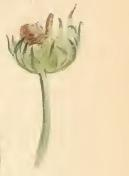
Scabious head, with larva case attached

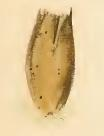
Empty seed husk, used by the young larva as its first case

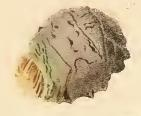
Larval case

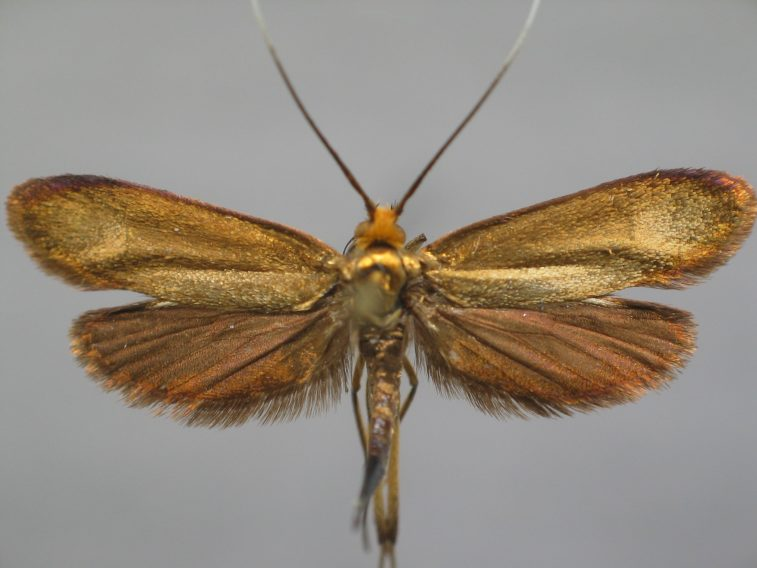
