= Nemophora cassiterites =

Scientific classification
- Kingdom: Animalia
- Phylum: Arthropoda
- Class: Insecta
- Order: Lepidoptera
- Family: Adelidae
- Genus: Nemophora
- Species: N. cassiterites

Binomial name
- Nemophora cassiterites (Meyrick, 1907)

Synonyms
- Nemotois cassiterites Meyrick, 1907

Species of moth

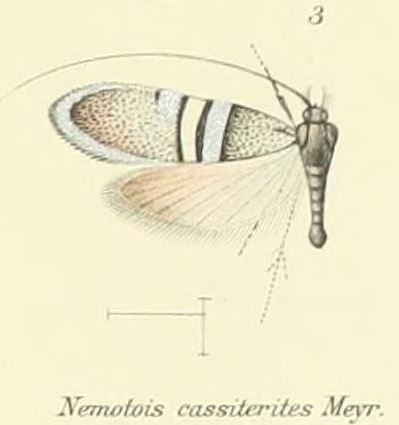
Nemophora cassiterites

Nemophora cassiterites is a moth of the Adelidae family or fairy longhorn moths. It was described by Edward Meyrick in 1907. It is found in India.
