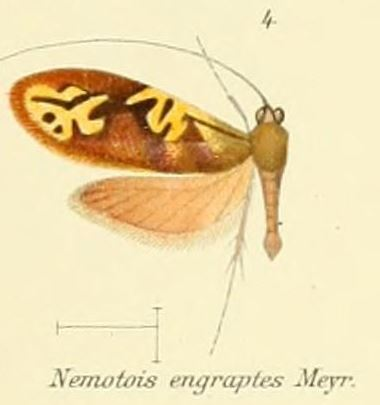

Scientific classification
- Kingdom: Animalia
- Phylum: Arthropoda
- Class: Insecta
- Order: Lepidoptera
- Family: Adelidae
- Genus: Nemophora
- Species: N. engraptes

Binomial name
- Nemophora engraptes (Meyrick, 1907)

Synonyms
- Nemotois engraptes Meyrick, 1907

= Nemophora engraptes =

Species of moth

Nemophora engraptes is a moth of the family Adelidae or fairy longhorn moths. It was described by Edward Meyrick in 1907. It is found in Sri Lanka.
