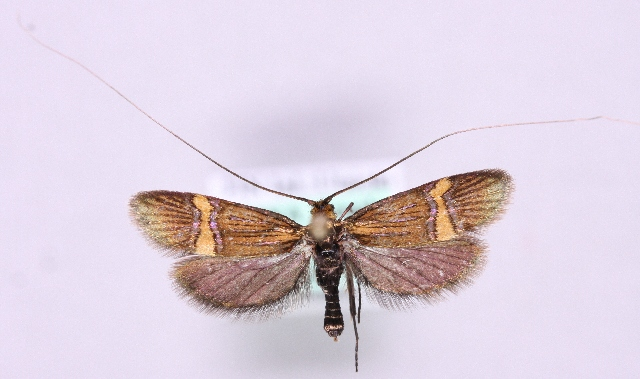

Scientific classification
- Kingdom: Animalia
- Phylum: Arthropoda
- Class: Insecta
- Order: Lepidoptera
- Family: Adelidae
- Genus: Nemophora
- Species: N. bellela

Binomial name
- Nemophora bellela (Walker, 1863)

Synonyms
- Adela belella Walker, 1863; Adela esmarkella Wocke, 1864; Adela hedemanni Christoph, 1888; Adela bellella Walsingham, 1890; Nemotois belleta Anderson, 1915; Nemophora belella Wojtusiak, 1996

= Nemophora bellela =

Species of moth

Nemophora bellela is a moth of the Adelidae family. It is the only circumpolar species of the Nemophora, and the only representative of the genus in North America, where it is found from Quebec across Canada north of the plains to the mountains of British Columbia and Alaska.

In Europe, it is found in Fennoscandia, Lithuania and northern Russia.

The wingspan is 17–20 millimetres (0.67–0.79 in). Adults are on wing in June and July in northern Europe.

The larvae feed on Betula nana and Salix species.
