= Nemophora stellata =

Scientific classification
- Kingdom: Animalia
- Phylum: Arthropoda
- Class: Insecta
- Order: Lepidoptera
- Family: Adelidae
- Genus: Nemophora
- Species: N. stellata

Binomial name
- Nemophora stellata Hirowatari, 1995

Species of moth

Nemophora stellata is a moth of the Adelidae family or fairy longhorn moths. It was described by Toshiya Hirowatari in 1995. It is found on the Japanese islands of Shikoku and Kyushu.

The wingspan is 9–12 mm. The base of the forewing is golden yellow.
