= Nemophora japonica =

Scientific classification
- Kingdom: Animalia
- Phylum: Arthropoda
- Class: Insecta
- Order: Lepidoptera
- Family: Adelidae
- Genus: Nemophora
- Species: N. japonica

Binomial name
- Nemophora japonica Stringer, 1930

Species of moth

Nemophora japonica is a moth of the Adelidae family or fairy longhorn moths. It was described by Stringer in 1930. It is found on the Kuriles and in Japan.
