= Nemophora griseella =

Scientific classification
- Kingdom: Animalia
- Phylum: Arthropoda
- Class: Insecta
- Order: Lepidoptera
- Family: Adelidae
- Genus: Nemophora
- Species: N. griseella

Binomial name
- Nemophora griseella Walsingham, 1880

Synonyms
- Nemotois cyphozona Meyrick, 1922; Nemophora cyphozona; Nemotois tricrates Meyrick, 1922; Nemophora tricrates

Species of moth

Nemophora griseella is a moth of the Adelidae family or fairy longhorn moths. It was described by Lord Walsingham in 1880. It is found in India, Burma and Nepal.
