= Nemophora bifasciatella =

Scientific classification
- Kingdom: Animalia
- Phylum: Arthropoda
- Class: Insecta
- Order: Lepidoptera
- Family: Adelidae
- Genus: Nemophora
- Species: N. bifasciatella

Binomial name
- Nemophora bifasciatella Issiki, 1930

Species of moth

Nemophora bifasciatella is a moth of the family Adelidae or fairy longhorn moths. It was described by Syuti Issiki in 1930. It is found in Japan (Hokkaido, Honshu, Shikoku, Kyushu).

The wingspan is 10–13 mm.

The larvae possibly feed on Hydrangea paniculata.
