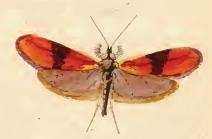

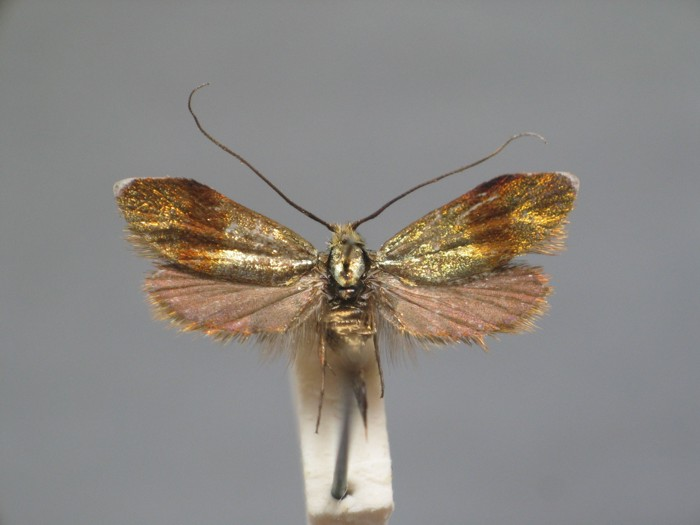

Scientific classification
- Kingdom: Animalia
- Phylum: Arthropoda
- Class: Insecta
- Order: Lepidoptera
- Family: Adelidae
- Genus: Nemophora
- Species: N. fasciella

Binomial name
- Nemophora fasciella (Fabricius, 1775)

Synonyms
- Alucita fasciella Fabricius, 1775; Nemotois annae Zeller, 1853; Tinea schiffermillerella [Denis & Schiffermüller], 1775; Nemotois purpureus Stainton, 1867; Nemophora purpureus

= Nemophora fasciella =

Species of moth

Nemophora fasciella is a moth of the Adelidae family. It is found in most of Europe, except Ireland, Fennoscandia, most of the Baltic region, Croatia, Slovenia, Switzerland and Portugal.

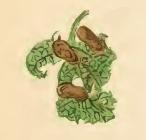
Leaf of Ballota nigra eaten by three larvae

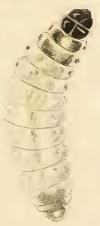
Larva

The wingspan is 13–16 millimetres (0.51–0.63 in). They are on wing in July.

The larvae feed on Ballota nigra.
