= Nemophora umbripennis =

Scientific classification
- Kingdom: Animalia
- Phylum: Arthropoda
- Class: Insecta
- Order: Lepidoptera
- Family: Adelidae
- Genus: Nemophora
- Species: N. umbripennis

Binomial name
- Nemophora umbripennis Stringer, 1930

Species of moth

Nemophora umbripennis is a moth of the Adelidae family or fairy longhorn moths. It was described by Stringer in 1930. It is found on the Kuriles and in Japan.

The wingspan is 14–16 mm for males and 13–14 mm for females.
