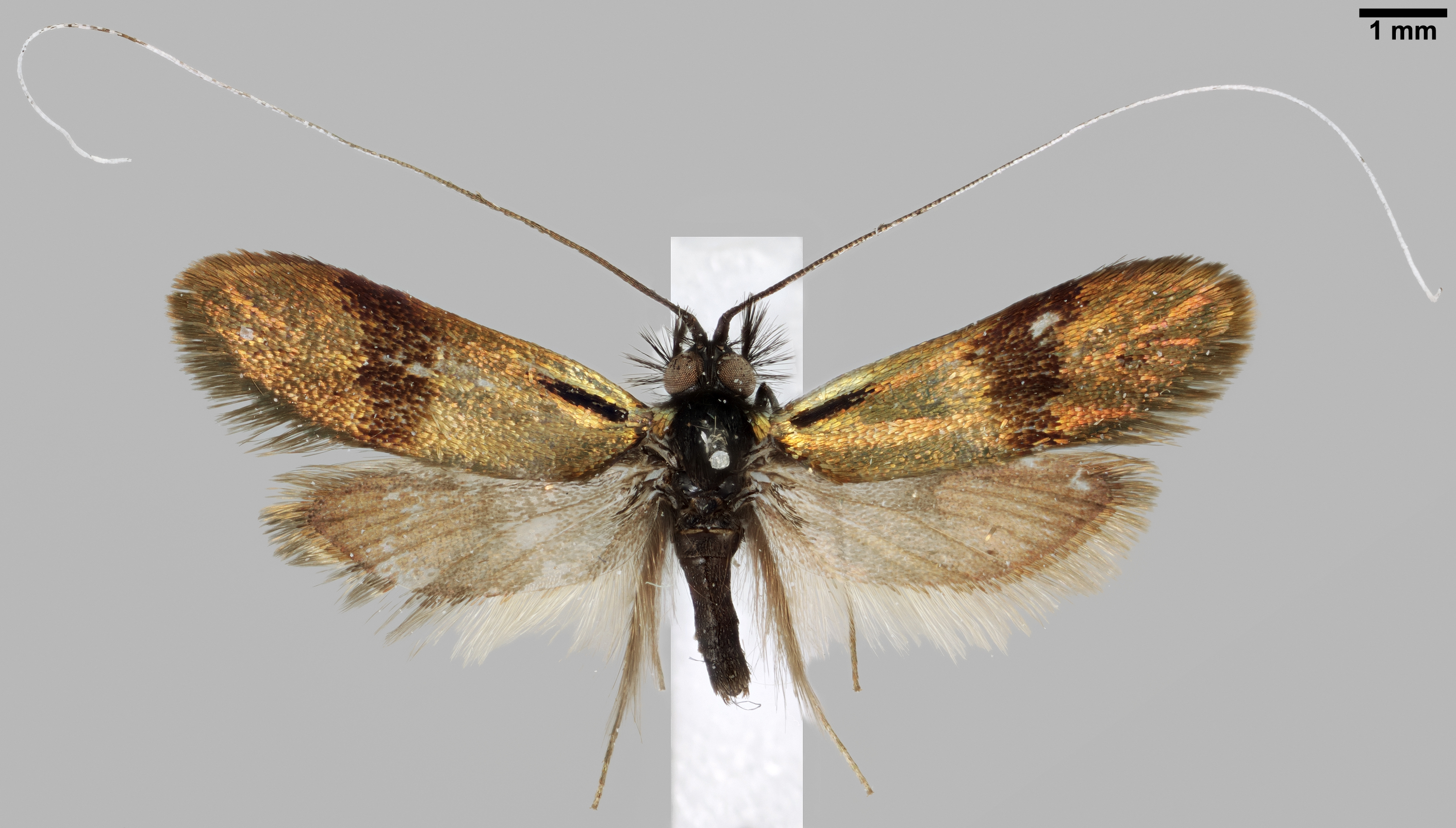

Scientific classification
- Kingdom: Animalia
- Phylum: Arthropoda
- Class: Insecta
- Order: Lepidoptera
- Family: Adelidae
- Genus: Nemophora
- Species: N. minimella

Binomial name
- Nemophora minimella (Denis & Schiffermüller, 1775)

Synonyms
- Tinea minimella Denis & Schiffermüller, 1775; Nemotois schiffermillerellus var. lenellus (Zeller, 1853)

= Nemophora minimella =

Species of moth

Nemophora minimella is a moth of the Adelidae family. It is found in most of Europe, except Estonia, Ukraine, Slovenia, Switzerland and Portugal.

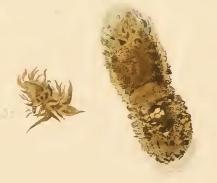
Part of scabious head with larva and larval case

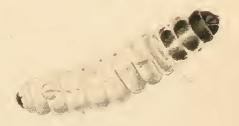
Larva

The wingspan is 11–13 millimetres (0.43–0.51 in). Adult males have antennae which are almost twice the wing length, while those of the female are just over one wing length. Head in males black, in female ferruginous. Forewings golden-bronzy, becoming coppery posteriorly, base more brassy; a blackish basal dash beneath costa; a very obscurely marked violet -brownish postmedian shade. Hindwings dark purplish - fuscous, in male sometimes whitish except apex.

They are on wing in July and fly during the day.

The larvae feed on Succisa pratensis and Scabiosa columbaria. They first feed on the seeds. Later, they feed on the lower leaves from within a portable case.
