= Nemophora ischnodesma =

Scientific classification
- Kingdom: Animalia
- Phylum: Arthropoda
- Class: Insecta
- Order: Lepidoptera
- Family: Adelidae
- Genus: Nemophora
- Species: N. ischnodesma

Binomial name
- Nemophora ischnodesma (Meyrick, 1928)

Synonyms
- Nemotois ischnodesma Meyrick, 1928; Nemophora ichnodesma

Species of moth

Nemophora ischnodesma is a moth of the family Adelidae or fairy longhorn moths. It was described by Edward Meyrick in 1928. It is found in India and western Malaysia.
