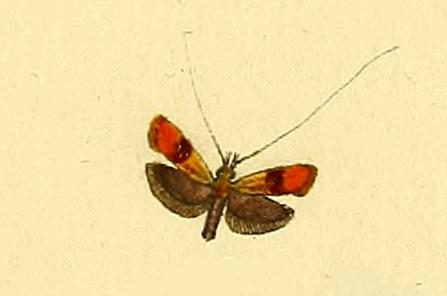

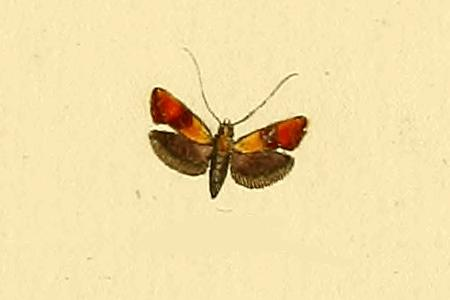

Scientific classification
- Kingdom: Animalia
- Phylum: Arthropoda
- Clade: Pancrustacea
- Class: Insecta
- Order: Lepidoptera
- Family: Adelidae
- Genus: Nemophora
- Species: N. molella

Binomial name
- Nemophora molella (Hübner, 1816)

Synonyms
- Tinea molella Hübner, 1816; Nemotois molellus Hartmann, 1880; Nemotois glabrata Meyrick, 1922

= Nemophora molella =

Species of moth

Nemophora molella is a moth of the Adelidae family. It is found in France, Hungary, Romania and Russia.
