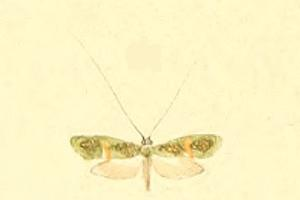

Scientific classification
- Kingdom: Animalia
- Phylum: Arthropoda
- Class: Insecta
- Order: Lepidoptera
- Family: Adelidae
- Genus: Nemophora
- Species: N. dumerilella

Binomial name
- Nemophora dumerilella (Duponchel, 1839)

Synonyms
- Adela dumerilella Duponchel, 1839; Nemophora dumerilellus; Adela inauratella Duponchel, 1844; Tinea basochesella Hübner, [1824]

= Nemophora dumerilella =

Species of moth

Nemophora dumerilella is a moth of the Adelidae family.

== Distribution ==
It is found in most of Europe, except Ireland, Great Britain, the Netherlands, Portugal, Italy, Slovenia, Croatia, Lithuania, Latvia, Estonia, Finland and Norway.

== Description ==
The wingspan is 11–13 millimetres (0.43–0.51 in). Adults are on wing in July.

The larvae feed on Hieracium and Hypericum species.
