= Nemophora basella =

Scientific classification
- Kingdom: Animalia
- Phylum: Arthropoda
- Class: Insecta
- Order: Lepidoptera
- Family: Adelidae
- Genus: Nemophora
- Species: N. basella

Binomial name
- Nemophora basella (Eversmann, 1844)

Synonyms
- Adela basella Eversmann, 1844; Adela basiradiella Christoph, 1888

Species of moth

Nemophora basella is a moth of the Adelidae family that can be found in Slovakia and Russia.
