= Nemophora assamensis =

Scientific classification
- Kingdom: Animalia
- Phylum: Arthropoda
- Class: Insecta
- Order: Lepidoptera
- Family: Adelidae
- Genus: Nemophora
- Species: N. assamensis

Binomial name
- Nemophora assamensis Kozlov, 1997

Species of moth

Nemophora assamensis is a moth of the Adelidae family. It is found in India.
