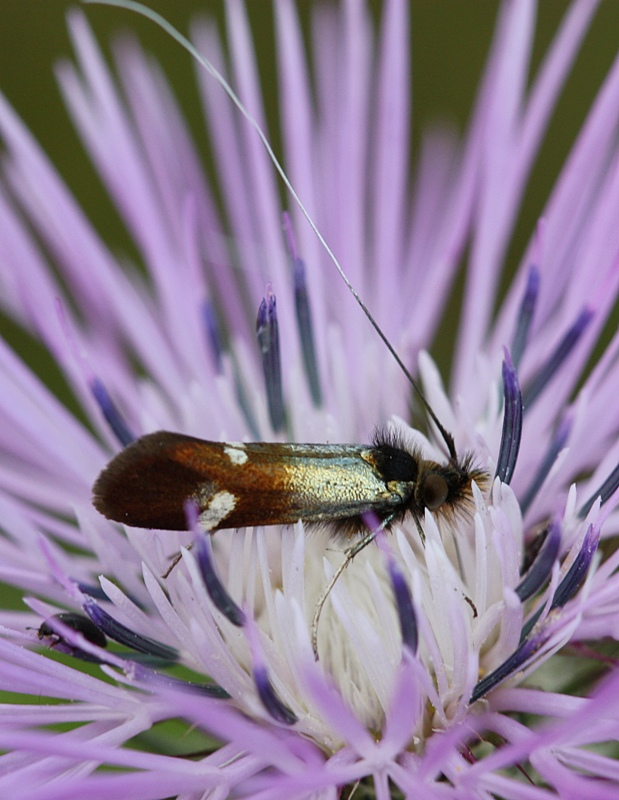
- Nemophora raddaella Spain

Scientific classification
- Kingdom: Animalia
- Phylum: Arthropoda
- Clade: Pancrustacea
- Class: Insecta
- Order: Lepidoptera
- Family: Adelidae
- Genus: Nemophora
- Species: N. raddaella

Binomial name
- Nemophora raddaella (Hübner, 1793)

Synonyms
- Phalaena raddaella Hubner, 1793; Nemophora raddella; Tinea raddella Hübner, [1796]; Alucita latreillella Fabricius, 1798; Nemotois raddaëllus Wocke, 1871; Nematois algeriensis Walsingham, 1907

= Nemophora raddaella =

Species of moth

Nemophora raddaella is a moth of the Adelidae family that is found in southern Europe.

The larvae feed on Dipsacus species and Scabiosa maritima.
