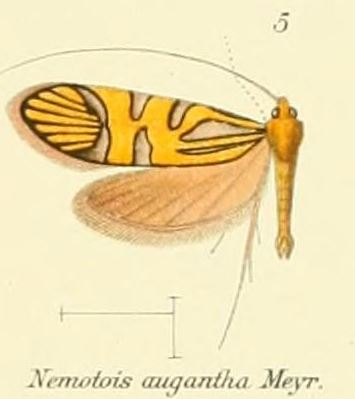

Scientific classification
- Kingdom: Animalia
- Phylum: Arthropoda
- Class: Insecta
- Order: Lepidoptera
- Family: Adelidae
- Genus: Nemophora
- Species: N. augantha

Binomial name
- Nemophora augantha (Meyrick, 1907)

Synonyms
- Nemotois augantha Meyrick, 1907

= Nemophora augantha =

Species of moth

Nemophora augantha is a moth of the family Adelidae or fairy longhorn moths. It was described by Edward Meyrick in 1907. It is found in Assam, India.
