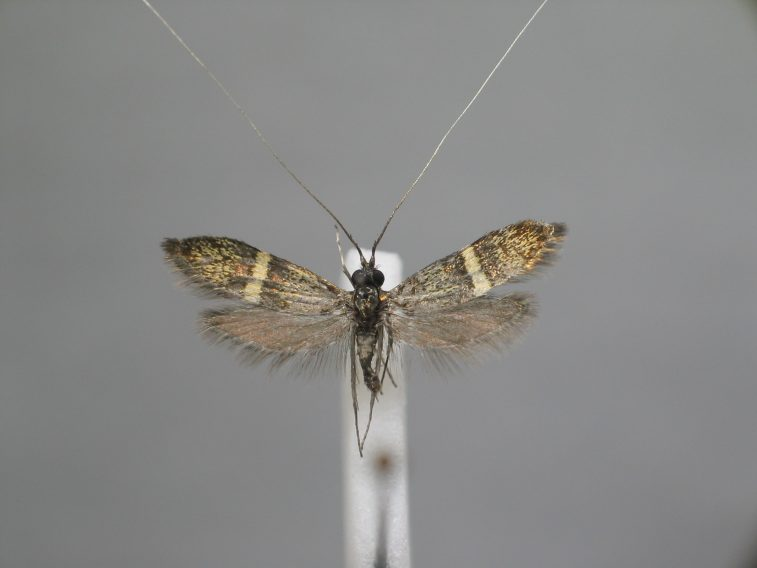

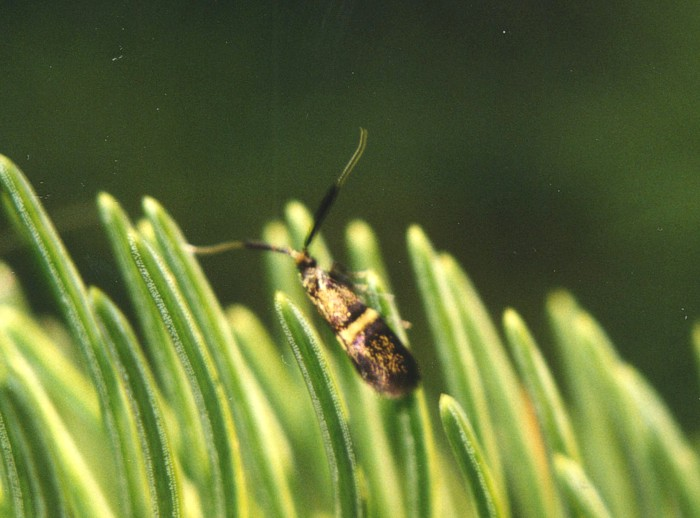

Scientific classification
- Kingdom: Animalia
- Phylum: Arthropoda
- Clade: Pancrustacea
- Class: Insecta
- Order: Lepidoptera
- Family: Adelidae
- Genus: Nemophora
- Species: N. associatella

Binomial name
- Nemophora associatella (Zeller, 1839)

Synonyms
- Adela associatella Zeller, 1839; Tinea megerlella Hübner, [1810]

= Nemophora associatella =

Species of moth

Nemophora associatella is a moth of the Adelidae family. It is found from Germany and Poland to the Pyrenees, Italy and the Balkan Peninsula. It is also present in Russia.

The wingspan is about 19 mm.

The larvae feed on Abies alba. They mine the leaves of their host plant. Mining larvae can be found in June.

== Taxonomy ==
This species was erroneously placed into the genus Adela by several authors.
