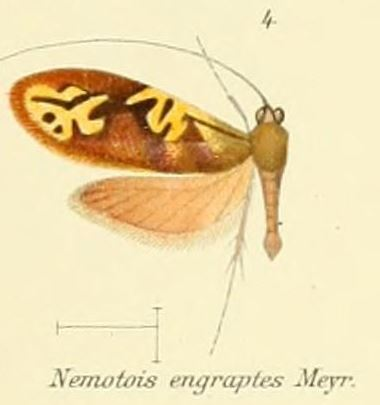
- Nemophora engraptes

Scientific classification
- Kingdom: Animalia
- Phylum: Arthropoda
- Class: Insecta
- Order: Lepidoptera
- Family: Adelidae
- Subfamily: Adelinae
- Genus: Nemophora; Illiger & Hoffmannsegg, 1798

Type species
- Phalaena (Tinea) degeerella Linnaeus, 1758

Species
- Several, see text

Synonyms
- Elasmion Hübner, 1822; Nemotois Hübner, 1825; Epityphia Hübner, 1825; Euptyphia Hübner, 1825; Ucetia Walker, 1866

= Nemophora =

Moth genus in family Adelidae

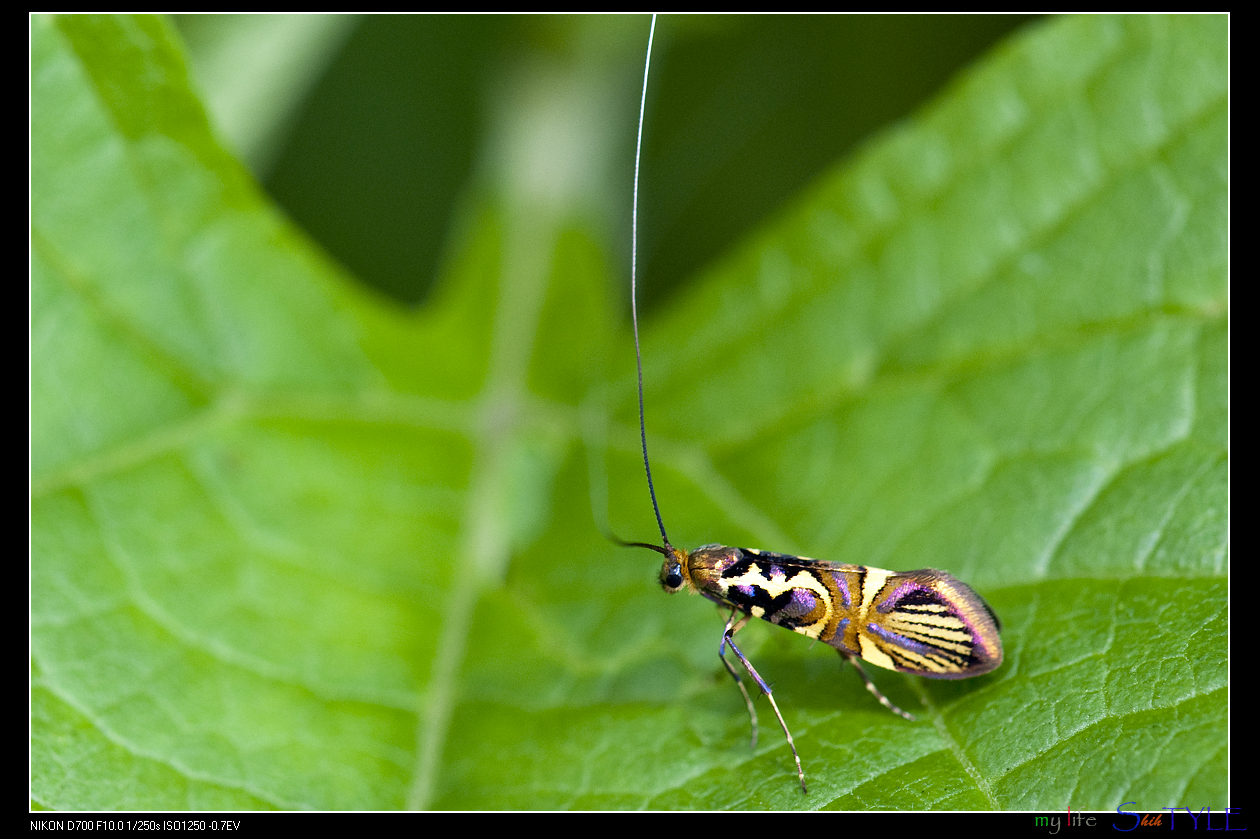
Nemophora magnifica

Nemophora is a genus of fairy longhorn moths in the family Adelidae.

== Selected species ==
- Nemophora ahenea Stringer, 1930
- Nemophora albiciliellus (Staudinger, 1859)
- Nemophora amatella (Staudinger, 1892)
- Nemophora askoldella (Milliére, 1879)
- Nemophora assamensis Kozlov, 1997
- Nemophora associatella (Zeller, 1839)
- Nemophora augantha (Meyrick 1907)
- Nemophora barbatellus Zeller, 1847
- Nemophora basella (Eversmann, 1844)
- Nemophora belella (Walker, 1863)
- Nemophora bifasciatella Issiki, 1930
- Nemophora cassiterites (Meyrick, 1907)
- Nemophora chionites (Meyrick, 1907)
- Nemophora chrysoprasias (Meyrick 1907)
- Nemophora congruella (Zeller, 1839)
- Nemophora cupriacella (Hübner, 1819)
- Nemophora degeerella (Linnaeus, 1758)
- Nemophora divina (Caradja, 1939)
- Nemophora dumerilellus (Duponchel, 1839)
- Nemophora engraptes (Meyrick, 1907)
- Nemophora fasciella (Fabricius, 1775)
- Nemophora griseella Walsingham, 1880
- Nemophora humilis (Walsingham, 1891)
- Nemophora ischnodesma (Meyrick)
- Nemophora istrianella (Heydenreich, 1851)
- Nemophora japonica Stringer, 1930
- Nemophora karafutonis (Matsumura, 1932)
- Nemophora lapikiella Kozlov, 1997
- Nemophora magnifica Kozlov, 1997
- Nemophora metallica (Poda, 1761)
- Nemophora minimella (Denis & Schiffermüller, 1775)
- Nemophora molella (Hübner, 1816)
- Nemophora ochsenheimerella (Hübner, 1813)
- Nemophora parvella (Walker, 1863)
- Nemophora pfeifferella (Hübner, 1813)
- Nemophora raddei (Rebel, 1901)
- Nemophora raddella (Hübner, 1793)
- Nemophora seraphias (Meyrick, 1907)
- Nemophora staudingerella Christoph, 1881
- Nemophora stellata Hirowatari, 1995
- Nemophora sylvatica Hirowatari, 1995
- Nemophora umbripennis Stringer, 1930
- Nemophora violellus (Stainton, 1851)
