= Nemophora raddei =

Scientific classification
- Kingdom: Animalia
- Phylum: Arthropoda
- Class: Insecta
- Order: Lepidoptera
- Family: Adelidae
- Genus: Nemophora
- Species: N. raddei

Binomial name
- Nemophora raddei (Rebel, 1901)

Species of moth

Nemophora raddei is a moth of the fairy longhorn moths or Adelidae family. It was described by Hans Rebel in 1901. It is found in Japan.

The wingspan is 14–16 millimetres (0.55–0.63 in).
