= Nemophora barbatellus =

Scientific classification
- Kingdom: Animalia
- Phylum: Arthropoda
- Clade: Pancrustacea
- Class: Insecta
- Order: Lepidoptera
- Family: Adelidae
- Genus: Nemophora
- Species: N. barbatellus

Binomial name
- Nemophora barbatellus (Zeller, 1847)

Synonyms
- Nemotois barbatellus Zeller, 1847; Nemotois chalcochrysellus Mann, 1855; Nemotois constantinella Baker, 1888; Nemotois demaisoni Ragonot, 1889; Nemotois padrejusto Agenjo, 1965

Species of moth

Nemophora barbatellus is a moth of the Adelidae family. It is found in southern Europe.
