= Nemophora amatella =

Scientific classification
- Kingdom: Animalia
- Phylum: Arthropoda
- Class: Insecta
- Order: Lepidoptera
- Family: Adelidae
- Genus: Nemophora
- Species: N. amatella

Binomial name
- Nemophora amatella (Staudinger, 1892)

Synonyms
- Adela amatella Staudinger, 1892; Adela degeerella var. amurensis Alphéraky, 1897; Adela kukunorensis Sauber, 1899; Adela badioumbratella Sauber, 1899; Adela coreana Matsumura, 1931; Nemotois degeerella f. ogasawarai Matsumura, 1932

Species of moth

Nemophora amatella is a moth of the Adelidae family. It is a trans-Palearctic species which is widely distributed in Asia (including Siberia, Korea, and Japan), as well as in northern Europe.

The wingspan is 17–24 mm. Adults are on wing in June and July in northern Europe.
