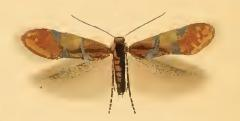
- Antispila metallella

Scientific classification
- Kingdom: Animalia
- Phylum: Arthropoda
- Clade: Pancrustacea
- Class: Insecta
- Order: Lepidoptera
- Family: Heliozelidae
- Genus: Antispila; Hübner, 1825

Synonyms
- Diacopia Clemens, 1872

= Antispila =

Genus of moths

Antispila is a moth genus of the family Heliozelidae. It was described by Jacob Hübner in 1825.

== Species ==
- Antispila ampelopsia
- Antispila ampelopsifoliella
- Antispila argentifera
- Antispila argostoma
- Antispila aristarcha
- Antispila aurirubra
- Antispila chlorosema
- Antispila cleyerella
- Antispila corniella
- Antispila cornifoliella
- Antispila cyclosema
- Antispila distyliella
- Antispila eugeniella
- Antispila freemani
- Antispila hikosana
- Antispila hydrangaeella
- Antispila hydrangifoliella
- Antispila inouei
- Antispila isabella
- Antispila isorrhythma
- Antispila iviella
- Antispila kunyuensis
- Antispila merinaella
- Antispila mesogramma
- Antispila metallella
- Antispila nolckeni
- Antispila nysaefoliella
- Antispila oinophylla
- Antispila orbiculella
- Antispila orthodelta
- Antispila pentalitha
- Antispila postscripta
- Antispila praecincta
- Antispila purplella
- Antispila tateshinensis
- Antispila treitschkiella
- Antispila trypherantis
- Antispila uenoi
- Antispila viticordifoliella
- Antispila voraginella

== Former species ==
- Antispila anna
- Antispila argyrozona
- Antispila micrarcha
- Antispila pariodelta
- Antispila salutans
- Antispila selastis

== Undescribed species ==
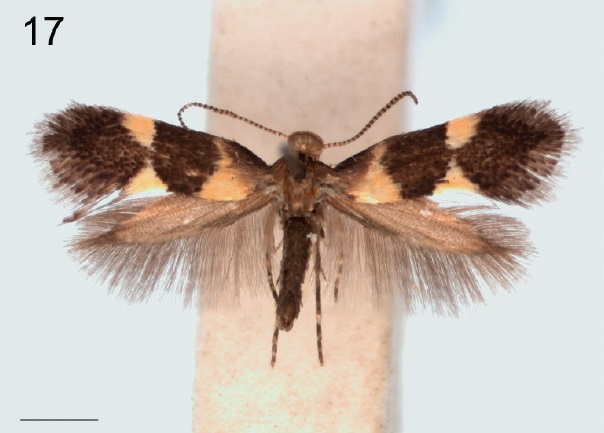
Antispila species on Rhoicissus, male, South Africa

== Status unknown ==
- Antispila grimmella (Hübner, 1824), described as Tinea grimella. Type location is Europe.
- Antispila jurinella (Hübner, 1811/1817), described as Tinea jurinella. Type location is Europe.
