= Antispila inouei =

Scientific classification
- Kingdom: Animalia
- Phylum: Arthropoda
- Class: Insecta
- Order: Lepidoptera
- Family: Heliozelidae
- Genus: Antispila
- Species: A. inouei

Binomial name
- Antispila inouei Kuroko, 1987

Species of moth

Antispila inouei is a moth of the family Heliozelidae. It was described by Kuroko in 1987. It is found in Japan.

The larvae feed on Vitis coignetiae and Vitis labruscana. They mine the leaves of their host plant.
