= Antispila hydrangifoliella =

Scientific classification
- Kingdom: Animalia
- Phylum: Arthropoda
- Class: Insecta
- Order: Lepidoptera
- Family: Heliozelidae
- Genus: Antispila
- Species: A. hydrangifoliella

Binomial name
- Antispila hydrangifoliella Kuroko, 1961

Species of moth

Antispila hydrangifoliella is a moth of the family Heliozelidae. It was described by Kuroko in 1961. It is found in Japan (Kyushu).

The wingspan is 5–6 mm. Adults appear from the end July to the beginning of August. There is one generation per year. Larvae are found from mid to the end of October. Pupation occurs in mid July.
