= Antispila tateshinensis =

Scientific classification
- Kingdom: Animalia
- Phylum: Arthropoda
- Class: Insecta
- Order: Lepidoptera
- Family: Heliozelidae
- Genus: Antispila
- Species: A. tateshinensis

Binomial name
- Antispila tateshinensis Kuroko, 1987

Species of moth

Antispila tateshinensis is a moth of the family Heliozelidae. It was described by Kuroko in 1987. It is found in Japan.

The larvae feed on Vitis coignetiae. They mine the leaves of their host plant.
