= Antispila corniella =

Scientific classification
- Kingdom: Animalia
- Phylum: Arthropoda
- Class: Insecta
- Order: Lepidoptera
- Family: Heliozelidae
- Genus: Antispila
- Species: A. corniella

Binomial name
- Antispila corniella Kuroko, 1961

Species of moth

Antispila corniella is a moth of the family Heliozelidae. It was described by Kuroko in 1961. It is found in Japan (Kyushu).

The wingspan is 5–6 mm. Adult moths usually appear from the end of July to August. Annually, the successive generations replaces the previous generations.

The larvae feed on Cornus controversa and Cornus brachypoda. They mine the leaves of their host plant. Larvae can be found from September to October. Full-grown larvae cut out a case from the end of the mine and descend to the ground. They hibernate within this case. Pupation occurs at the beginning of June of the following year.
