= Gum Grove, Ohio =

Coordinates: 39°22′50″N 84°01′39″W

Gum Grove is a small unincorporated community in Warren County, in the U.S. state of Ohio.

== History ==
The community was named for a grove of gum trees near the original town site. The community had a schoolhouse, the Gum Grove School, now defunct.
