= Antispila hikosana =

Scientific classification
- Kingdom: Animalia
- Phylum: Arthropoda
- Class: Insecta
- Order: Lepidoptera
- Family: Heliozelidae
- Genus: Antispila
- Species: A. hikosana

Binomial name
- Antispila hikosana Kuroko, 1961

Species of moth

Antispila hikosana is a moth of the family Heliozelidae. It was described by Kuroko in 1961. It is found in Japan (Kyushu).

The wingspan is 8–9 mm. Adults appear from April to the beginning of May. There is one generation per year.

The larvae feed on Cornus controversa and Cornus brachypoda. They mine the leaves of their host plant.
