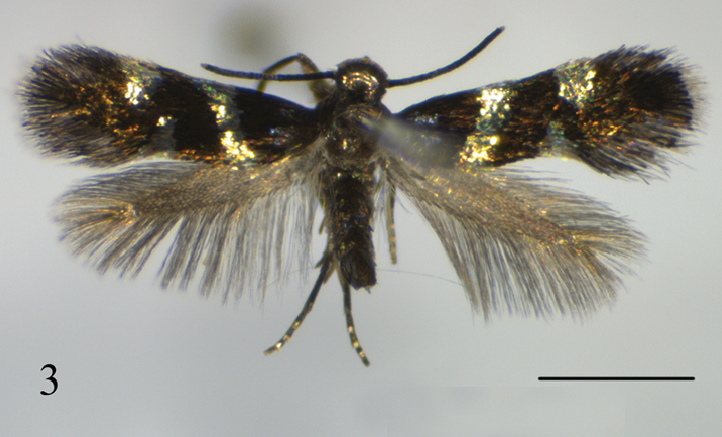

Scientific classification
- Kingdom: Animalia
- Phylum: Arthropoda
- Class: Insecta
- Order: Lepidoptera
- Family: Heliozelidae
- Genus: Antispila
- Species: A. uenoi

Binomial name
- Antispila uenoi Kuroko, 1987

= Antispila uenoi =

Species of moth

Antispila uenoi is a moth of the family Heliozelidae. It was described by Kuroko in 1987. It is found in Japan. In 2018, the species was found from China.

The larvae feed on Vitis coignetiae and Vitis labruscana. They mine the leaves of their host plant.
