= Antispila purplella =

Scientific classification
- Kingdom: Animalia
- Phylum: Arthropoda
- Class: Insecta
- Order: Lepidoptera
- Family: Heliozelidae
- Genus: Antispila
- Species: A. purplella

Binomial name
- Antispila purplella Kuroko, 1961

Species of moth

Antispila purplella is a moth of the family Heliozelidae. It was described by Kuroko in 1961. It is found in Japan (Kyushu).

The wingspan is 6.5–7.5 mm. Adults appear at the beginning of June. There is one generation per year.

The larvae feed on Cornus controversa and Cornus brachypoda. They mine the leaves of their host plant. Larvae are found from the end of September to the beginning of October. Pupation takes place at the end of May of the following year.
