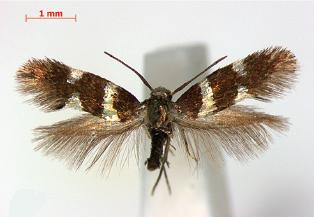
- Male Antispila cf. isabella from Mansfield, CT

Scientific classification
- Kingdom: Animalia
- Phylum: Arthropoda
- Clade: Pancrustacea
- Class: Insecta
- Order: Lepidoptera
- Family: Heliozelidae
- Genus: Antispila
- Species: A. isabella

Binomial name
- Antispila isabella Clemens, 1860

= Antispila isabella =

Species of moth

Antispila isabella is a species of moth of the family Heliozelidae. It is found in Ontario, Connecticut, Georgia, Kentucky, New York, Pennsylvania and Vermont. However, research concludes that a complex of species is involved under this name.

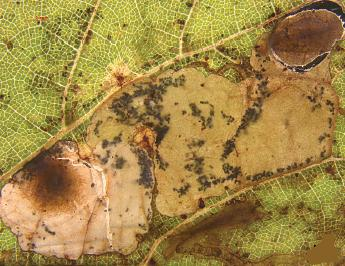
Mine

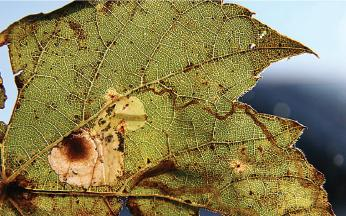
Mine

The larvae feed on Vitis aestivalis, Vitis labrusca and Vitis riparia. They mine the leaves of their host plant. The mines are relatively large. No gallery is visible and the mine has the form of a large blotch, with a roundish patch of reddish frass near the beginning, probably attached to the upper epidermis, and dispersed black frass throughout the mine.
