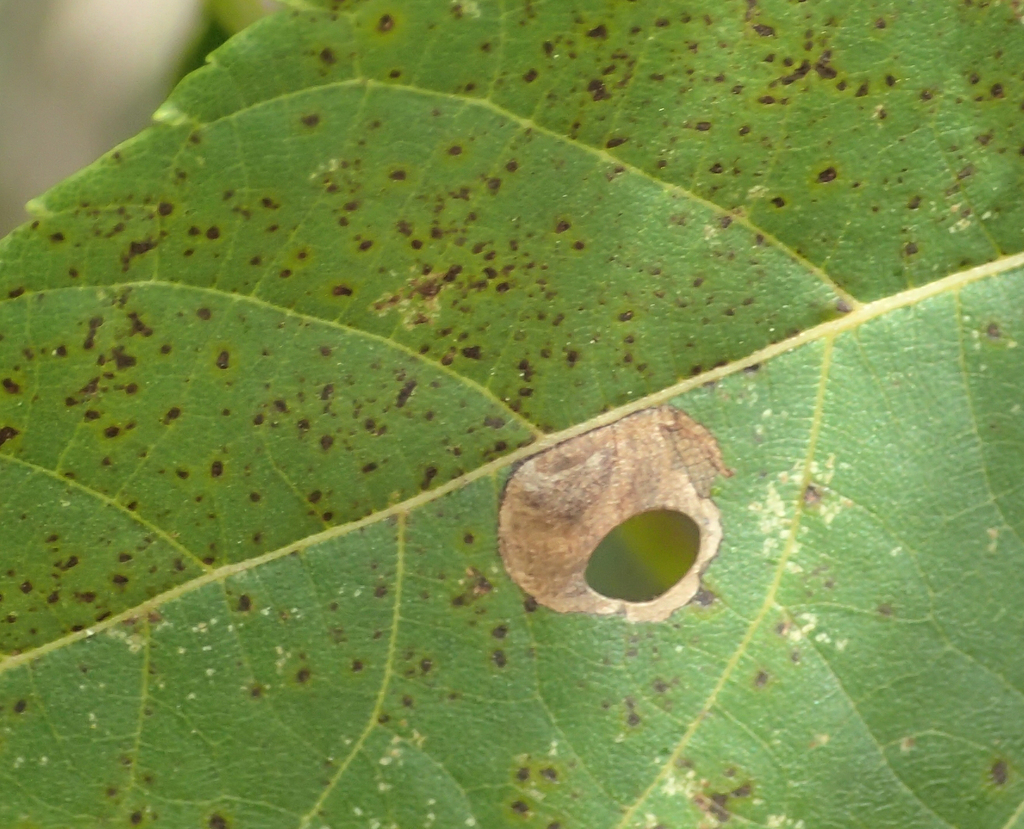

Scientific classification
- Kingdom: Animalia
- Phylum: Arthropoda
- Clade: Pancrustacea
- Class: Insecta
- Order: Lepidoptera
- Family: Heliozelidae
- Genus: Coptodisca
- Species: C. juglandella

Binomial name
- Coptodisca juglandella (Chambers, 1874)

Synonyms
- Aspidisca juglandiella Chambers 1874

= Coptodisca juglandella =

Species of moth

Coptodisca juglandella is a moth of the family Heliozelidae. It was described by Vactor Tousey Chambers in 1874. It is found in North America, including California, Ohio and Illinois.

There are at least two generations per year.

The larvae feed on Juglans nigra. They mine the leaves of their host plant. Larvae have been recorded in June and September.
