= Antispila nysaefoliella =

Scientific classification
- Kingdom: Animalia
- Phylum: Arthropoda
- Clade: Pancrustacea
- Class: Insecta
- Order: Lepidoptera
- Family: Heliozelidae
- Genus: Antispila
- Species: A. nysaefoliella

Binomial name
- Antispila nysaefoliella Clemens, 1860

Synonyms
- Antispila nyssaefoliella

Species of moth

Antispila nysaefoliella (tupelo leafminer moth) is a species of moth of the family Heliozelidae. It is found in south-eastern North America.

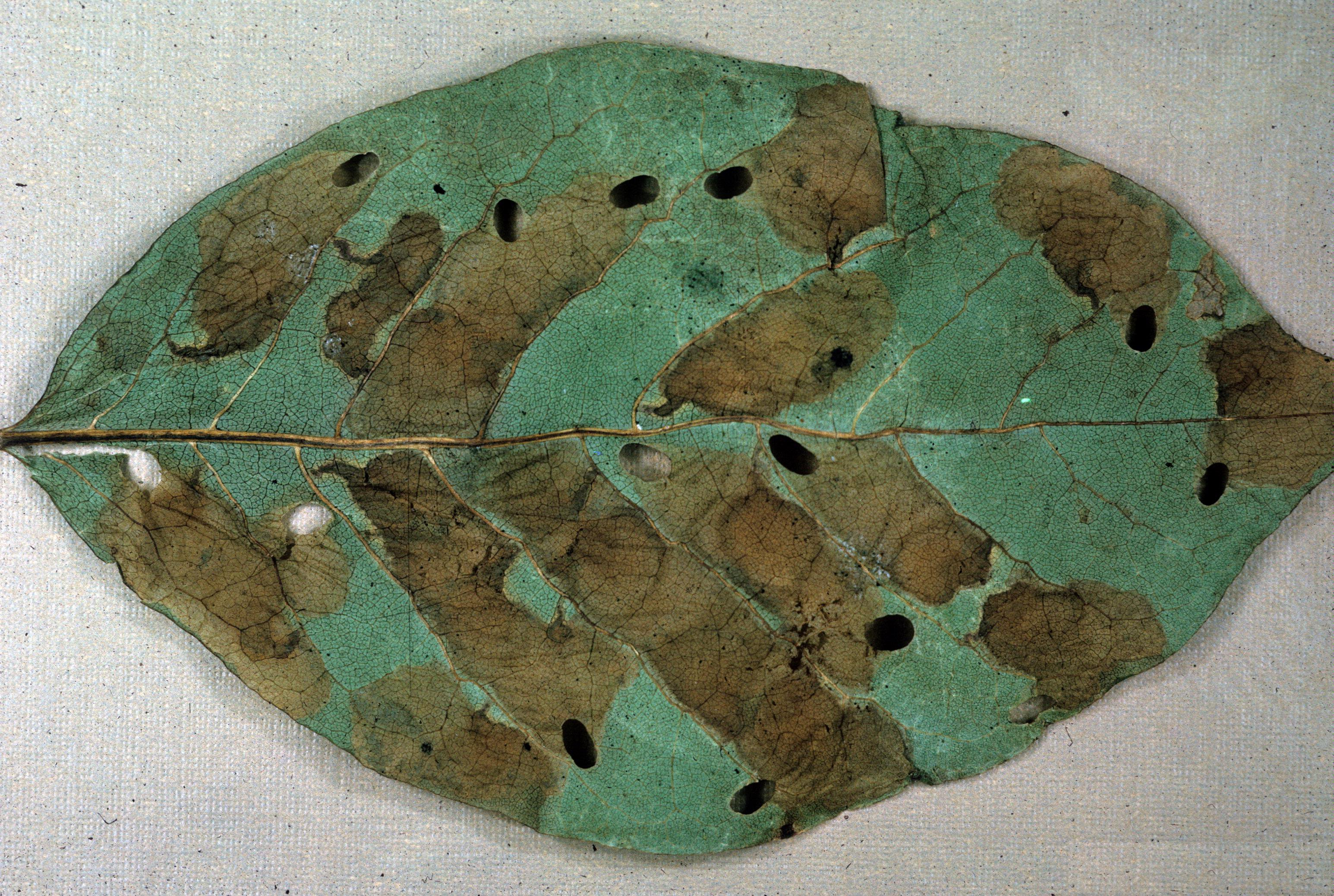
Damage

The wingspan is about 8 mm. Adults are on wing in spring.

The larvae feed on Nyssa sylvatica. They mine the leaves of their host plant. Low (2008) observed that the larvae are able to make sounds using sclerotized structures on their dorsum and tail. Larvae can be found from late August to early September.
