= Antispila trypherantis =

Scientific classification
- Kingdom: Animalia
- Phylum: Arthropoda
- Class: Insecta
- Order: Lepidoptera
- Family: Heliozelidae
- Genus: Antispila
- Species: A. trypherantis

Binomial name
- Antispila trypherantis Meyrick, 1916

Species of moth

Antispila trypherantis is a moth of the family Heliozelidae. It was described by Edward Meyrick in 1916. It is found in Guyana.

The wingspan is 7 mm. The forewings are dark fuscous, with shining golden-whitish markings. The hindwings dark grey.
