= Antispila cleyerella =

Scientific classification
- Kingdom: Animalia
- Phylum: Arthropoda
- Class: Insecta
- Order: Lepidoptera
- Family: Heliozelidae
- Genus: Antispila
- Species: A. cleyerella

Binomial name
- Antispila cleyerella B.W. Lee, 2006

Species of moth

Antispila cleyerella is a moth of the family Heliozelidae that is endemic to Japan.

The length of the forewings is 2.8–3.3 millimetres (0.11–0.13 in). Adults are on wing from late April to early May.

The larvae feed on Cleyera japonica. They mine the leaves of their host plant. Mines and larvae can be found from late March to mid April.
