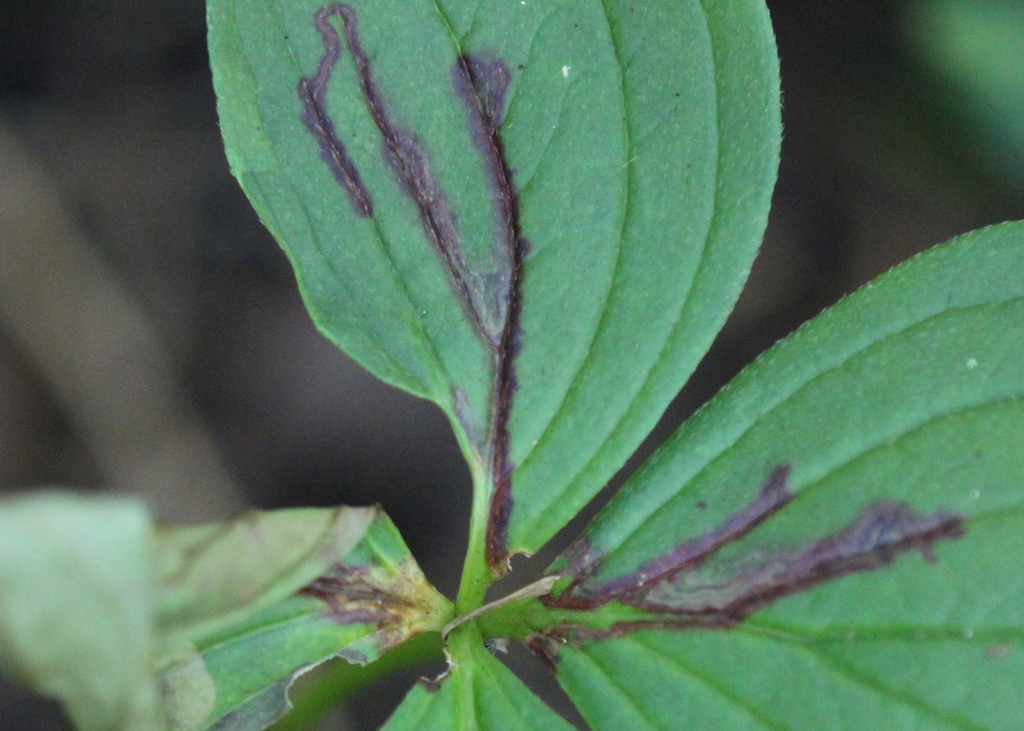

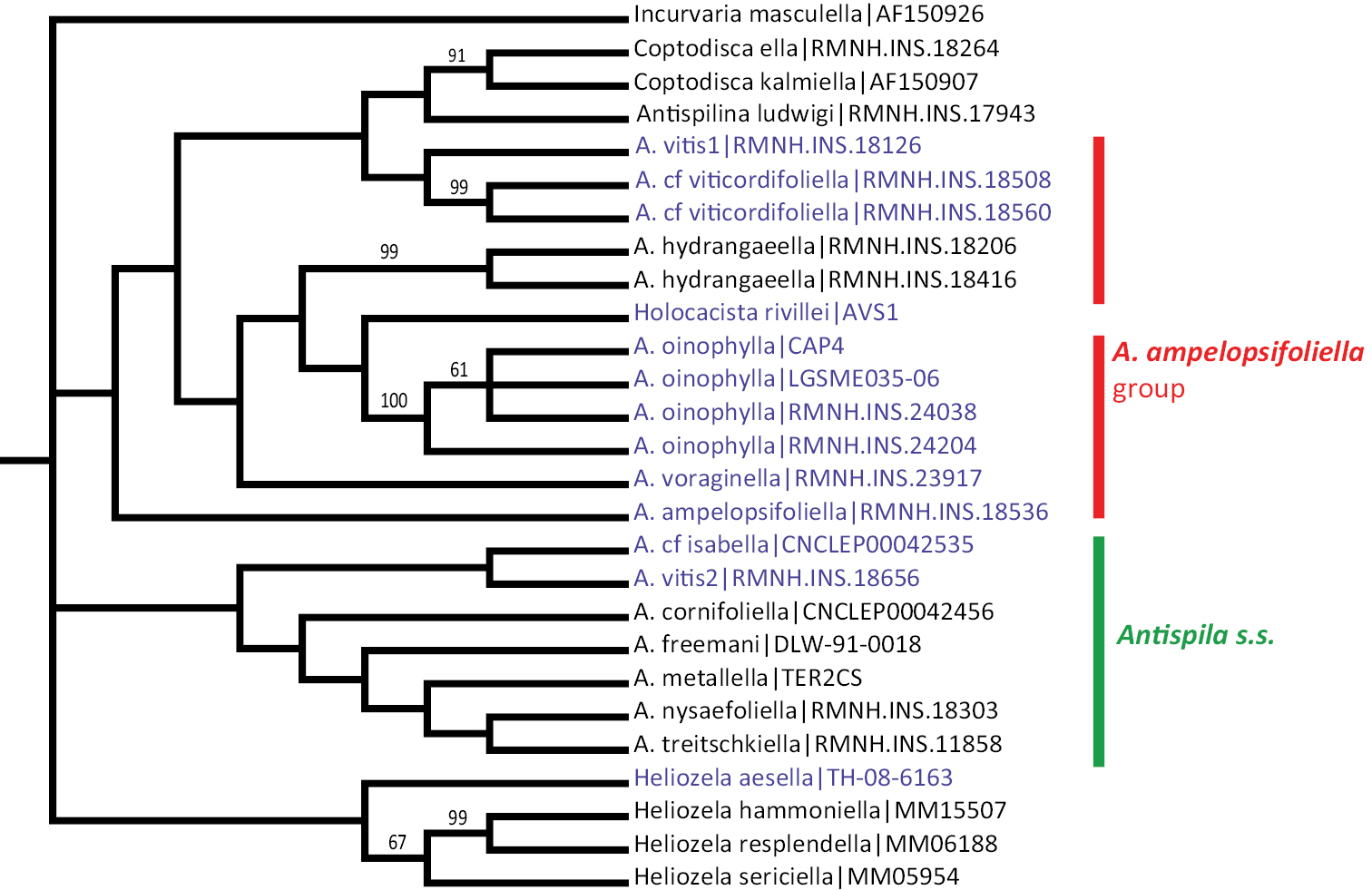

Scientific classification
- Kingdom: Animalia
- Phylum: Arthropoda
- Clade: Pancrustacea
- Class: Insecta
- Order: Lepidoptera
- Family: Heliozelidae
- Genus: Antispila
- Species: A. cornifoliella

Binomial name
- Antispila cornifoliella Clemens, 1860

= Antispila cornifoliella =

Species of moth

Antispila cornifoliella is a moth of the family Heliozelidae. It is found in North America, including Alberta, Maryland, Ohio, Ontario, Pennsylvania and Quebec.

The larvae feed on Cornus species. They mine the leaves of their host plant, typically in September.

In the larva, the head and shield are dark brown. Most of the rest of its body is white. For adults, the body is mostly dark brown, with purplish brown hind wings.
