= Antispila praecincta =

Scientific classification
- Kingdom: Animalia
- Phylum: Arthropoda
- Class: Insecta
- Order: Lepidoptera
- Family: Heliozelidae
- Genus: Antispila
- Species: A. praecincta

Binomial name
- Antispila praecincta Meyrick, 1921

Species of moth

Antispila praecincta is a moth of the family Heliozelidae. It was described by Edward Meyrick in 1921. It is found in Brazil.
