= Antispila kunyuensis =

Scientific classification
- Kingdom: Animalia
- Phylum: Arthropoda
- Clade: Pancrustacea
- Class: Insecta
- Order: Lepidoptera
- Family: Heliozelidae
- Genus: Antispila
- Species: A. kunyuensis

Binomial name
- Antispila kunyuensis Wang, Liu, Xu, Jiang, 2018

Species of moth

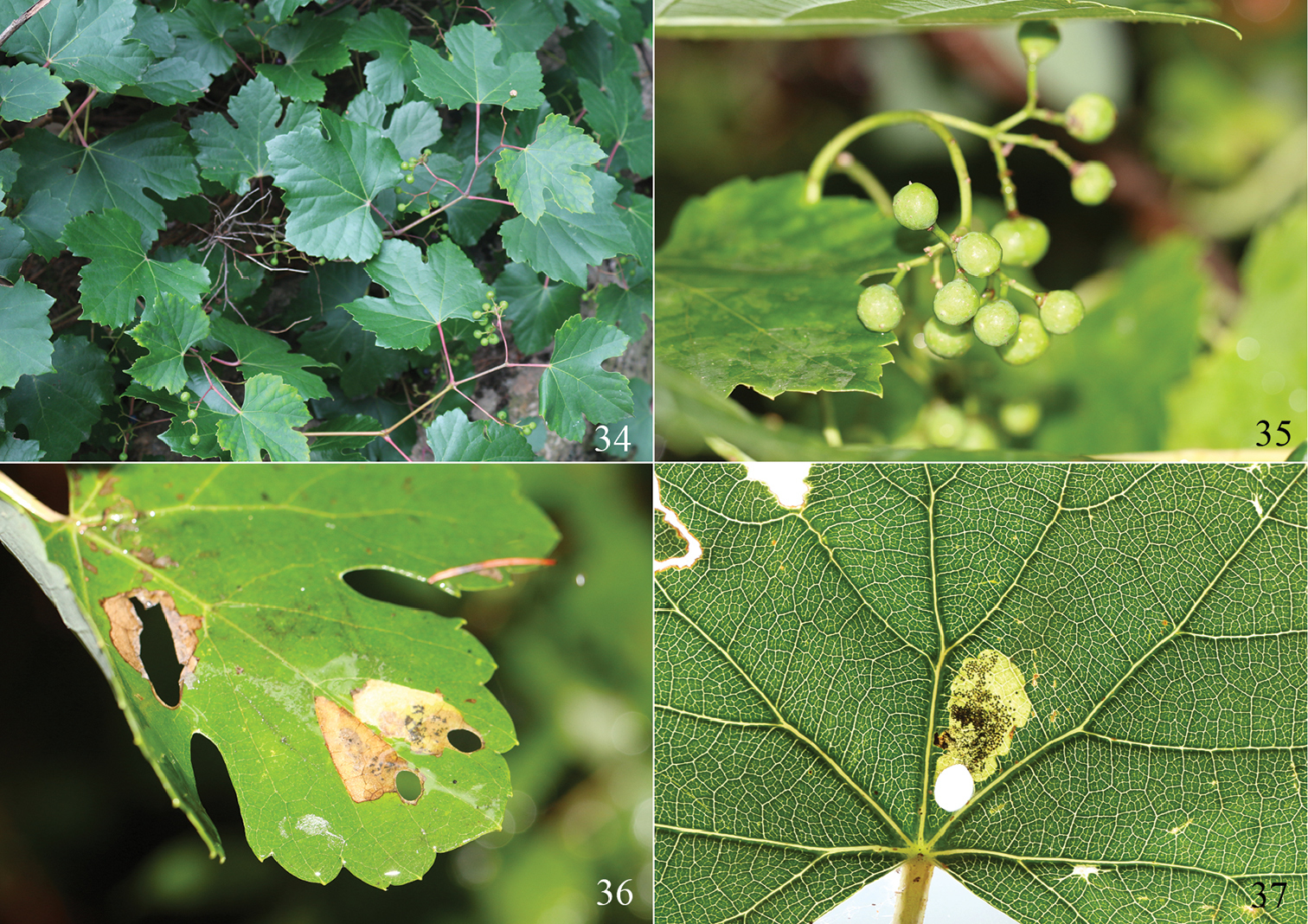
Host plant and leaf-mines of the Antispila species

Antispila kunyuensis is a moth of the family Heliozelidae. It is found in China (Shandong Peninsula).

== Etymology ==
The specific name kunyuensis is due to type locality of the new species, Mount Kunyu.

== Description ==
The wingspan is 1.7–2.1 mm. The forewings are dark fuscous with strong reddish reflection. Two pairs of opposite triangular silvery spots found on costa and dorsum. Costal spot of inner pair. cilia unicolorous. The hindwings are dark gray with dark cilia. Dorsal part of abdomen is dark gray, whereas ventral part is yellowish gray. Antennae dark fuscous, legs grey, and thorax dark fuscous.

The larvae feed on Ampelopsis humulifolia. They mine the leaves of their host plant.
