= Antispilina =

Scientific classification
- Kingdom: Animalia
- Phylum: Arthropoda
- Clade: Pancrustacea
- Class: Insecta
- Order: Lepidoptera
- Family: Heliozelidae
- Genus: Antispilina; Hering, 1941
- Species: A. ludwigi

Binomial name
- Antispilina ludwigi M. Hering, 1941

Species of moth

Antispilina ludwigi is a moth of the Heliozelidae family. It is found in Germany, Poland and the Czech Republic. It is the only species in the genus Antispilina.

The larvae feed on Persicaria bistorta. They mine the leaves of their host plant. The mine starts as a full depth blotch, which develops in all directions. There are mostly several of these blotches in a single leaf. The frass is granular and blackish green in colour. It is deposited in the middle of the mine. Larvae can be found in July.
