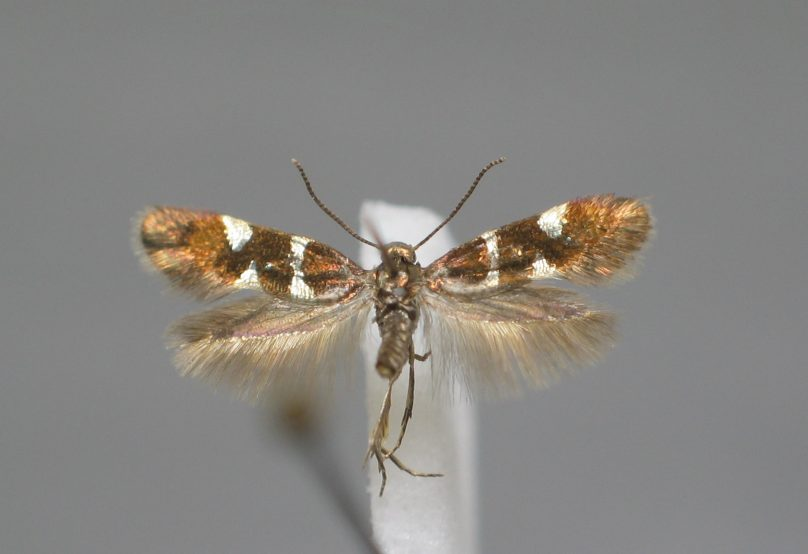

Scientific classification
- Kingdom: Animalia
- Phylum: Arthropoda
- Class: Insecta
- Order: Lepidoptera
- Family: Heliozelidae
- Genus: Antispila
- Species: A. metallella

Binomial name
- Antispila metallella (Denis & Schiffermüller, 1775)

Synonyms
- Tinea metallella Denis & Schiffermuller, 1775; Tinea pfeifferella Hubner, 1813; Antispila pfeifferella

= Antispila metallella =

Species of moth

Antispila metallella is a moth of the family Heliozelidae. It is found from Scandinavia to the Pyrenees, Alps and Romania and from Great Britain to Russia.

The wingspan is 8–9 mm. Adults are bronzy metallic with paler metallic markings. They are on wing in May.

Larva

The larvae feed on Cornus alba, Cornus mas and Cornus sanguinea. They mine the leaves of their host plant. Larvae can be found from July to August.
