= Antispila chlorosema =

Scientific classification
- Kingdom: Animalia
- Phylum: Arthropoda
- Class: Insecta
- Order: Lepidoptera
- Family: Heliozelidae
- Genus: Antispila
- Species: A. chlorosema

Binomial name
- Antispila chlorosema Meyrick, 1931

Species of insect

Antispila chlorosema is a moth of the family Heliozelidae. It was described by Edward Meyrick in 1931. It is found in Chile.
