= Tyriozela =

Scientific classification
- Kingdom: Animalia
- Phylum: Arthropoda
- Clade: Pancrustacea
- Class: Insecta
- Order: Lepidoptera
- Family: Heliozelidae
- Genus: Tyriozela; Meyrick, 1931
- Species: T. porphyrogona

Binomial name
- Tyriozela porphyrogona Meyrick, 1931

Genus of moths

Tyriozela porphyrogona is a moth of the family Heliozelidae. It is the only species in the genus Tyriozela. It was described by Edward Meyrick in 1931. It is found in Japan and Russia.

The wingspan is 8-8.5 mm.
