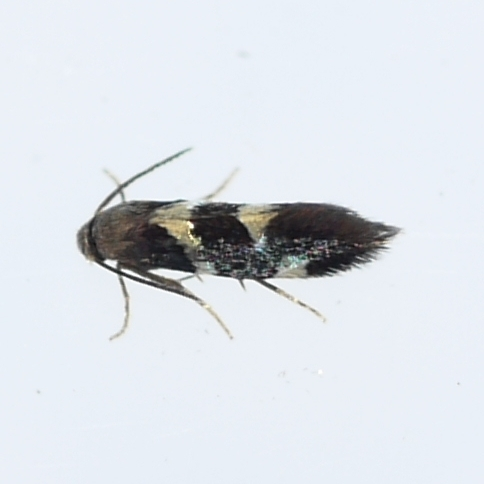

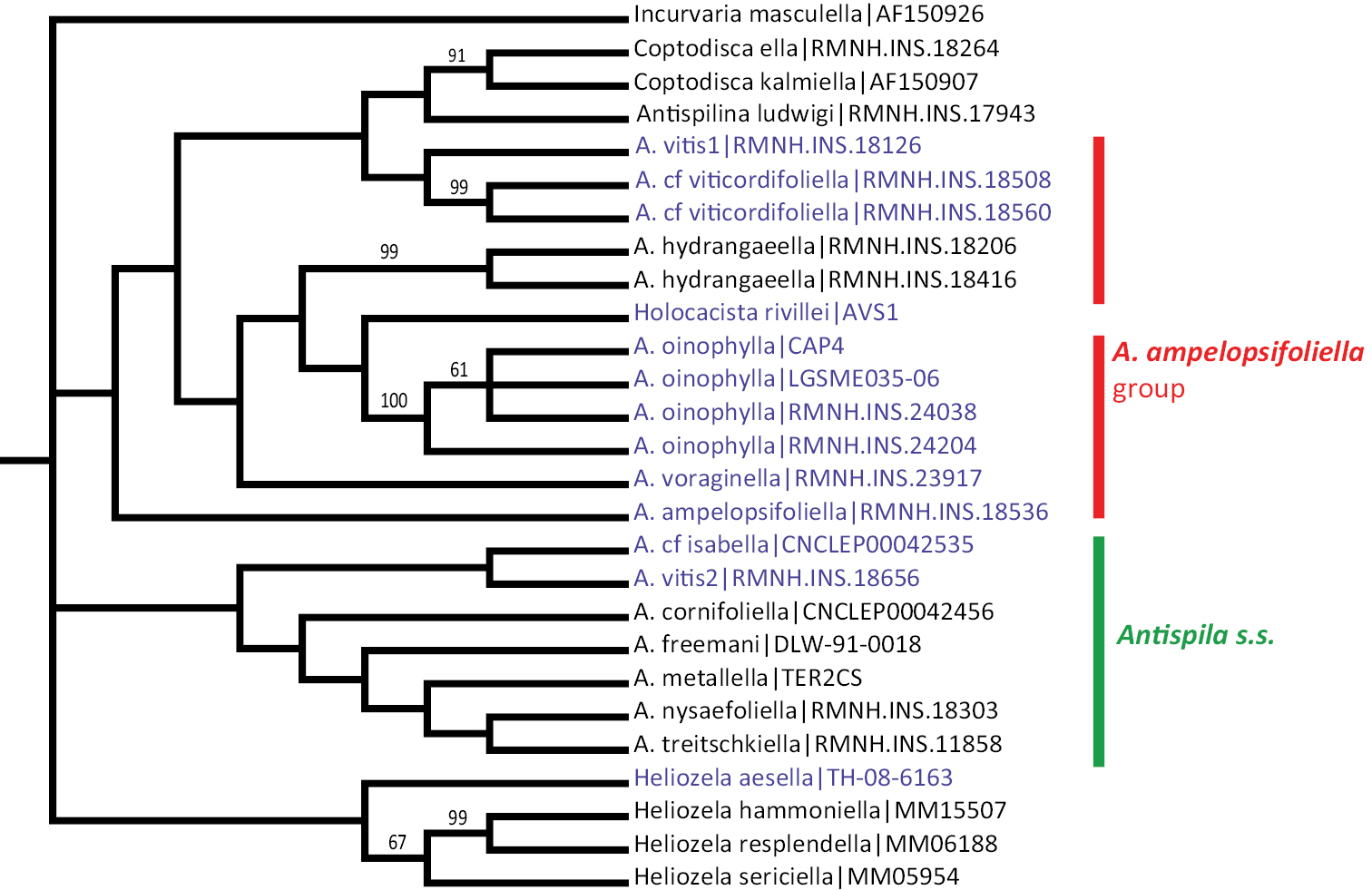

Scientific classification
- Kingdom: Animalia
- Phylum: Arthropoda
- Clade: Pancrustacea
- Class: Insecta
- Order: Lepidoptera
- Family: Heliozelidae
- Genus: Antispila
- Species: A. freemani

Binomial name
- Antispila freemani Lafontaine, 1973

= Antispila freemani =

Species of moth

Antispila freemani is a moth of the family Heliozelidae. It was described by J. Donald Lafontaine in 1973. It is found in North America, including Ontario and British Columbia.

The larvae feed on Cornus canadensis.
