= Antispila iviella =

Scientific classification
- Kingdom: Animalia
- Phylum: Arthropoda
- Class: Insecta
- Order: Lepidoptera
- Family: Heliozelidae
- Genus: Antispila
- Species: A. iviella

Binomial name
- Antispila iviella Kuroko, 1961

Species of moth

Antispila iviella is a moth of the family Heliozelidae. It was described by Kuroko in 1961. It is found in Japan (Yakushima).

The wingspan is 5–6 mm. Adults appear in July.

The larvae feed on Parthenocissus tricuspidata. They mine the leaves of their host plant. Larvae have been recorded at the end of October.
