= Antispila orbiculella =

Scientific classification
- Kingdom: Animalia
- Phylum: Arthropoda
- Class: Insecta
- Order: Lepidoptera
- Family: Heliozelidae
- Genus: Antispila
- Species: A. orbiculella

Binomial name
- Antispila orbiculella Kuroko, 1961

Species of moth

Antispila orbiculella is a moth of the family Heliozelidae. It was described by Kuroko in 1961. It is found in Japan (Kyushu and Yakushima).

The wingspan is 4-4.5 mm. Adults appear from mid June to the beginning of July. There is one generation per year.

The larvae feed on Ampelopsis glandulosa. They mine the leaves of their host plant. Pupation occurs at the end of May of the following year.
