= Antispila distyliella =

Scientific classification
- Kingdom: Animalia
- Phylum: Arthropoda
- Class: Insecta
- Order: Lepidoptera
- Family: Heliozelidae
- Genus: Antispila
- Species: A. distyliella

Binomial name
- Antispila distyliella Lee, Hirowatari & Kuroko, 2006

Species of moth

Antispila distyliella is a moth of the family Heliozelidae. It is found on the Ryukyu Islands in Japan.

The length of the forewings is 3.1–3.8 millimetres (0.12–0.15 in). Adults emerge from early to mid June.

The larvae feed on Distylium racemosum. Larvae can be found from late March to early April.
