= Antispila ampelopsia =

Scientific classification
- Kingdom: Animalia
- Phylum: Arthropoda
- Class: Insecta
- Order: Lepidoptera
- Family: Heliozelidae
- Genus: Antispila
- Species: A. ampelopsia

Binomial name
- Antispila ampelopsia Kuroko, 1961

Species of moth

Antispila ampelopsia is a moth of the family Heliozelidae. It was described by Kuroko in 1961. It is found in Japan (Kyushu and Yakushima).

The wingspan is 4.5-5.5 mm. Adults appear in mid August, mid September and at the end of June. There are two to three generations per year.

The larvae feed on Ampelopsis glandulosa and Vitis flexuosa. They mine the leaves of their host plant. Larvae are found at the end of July, mid August and from the end of September to mid October.
