= Antispila pentalitha =

Scientific classification
- Kingdom: Animalia
- Phylum: Arthropoda
- Class: Insecta
- Order: Lepidoptera
- Family: Heliozelidae
- Genus: Antispila
- Species: A. pentalitha

Binomial name
- Antispila pentalitha Meyrick, 1916

Species of moth

Antispila pentalitha is a moth of the family Heliozelidae. It was described by Edward Meyrick in 1916. It is found in Guyana.
