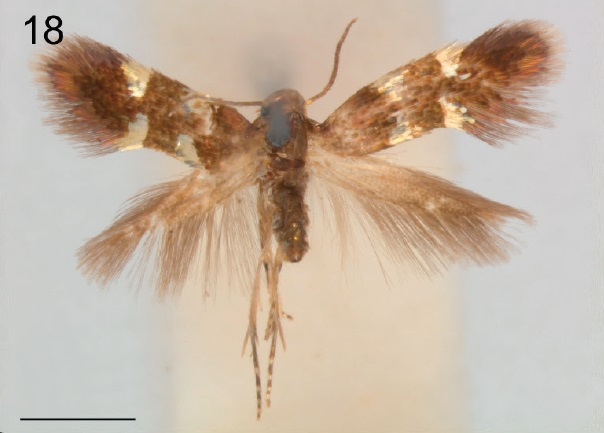

Scientific classification
- Domain: Eukaryota
- Kingdom: Animalia
- Phylum: Arthropoda
- Class: Insecta
- Order: Lepidoptera
- Family: Heliozelidae
- Genus: Antispila
- Species: A. argostoma

Binomial name
- Antispila argostoma Meyrick, 1916

= Antispila argostoma =

Species of moth

Antispila argostoma is a moth of the family Heliozelidae. It was described by Edward Meyrick in 1916. It is found in India.

The larvae feed on Cayratia trifolia.
