= Antispila merinaella =

Scientific classification
- Kingdom: Animalia
- Phylum: Arthropoda
- Class: Insecta
- Order: Lepidoptera
- Family: Heliozelidae
- Genus: Antispila
- Species: A. merinaella

Binomial name
- Antispila merinaella Paulian & Viette, 1955

Species of moth

Antispila merinaella is a moth of the family Heliozelidae. It was described by Paulian and Viette in 1955. It is found on Madagascar.
