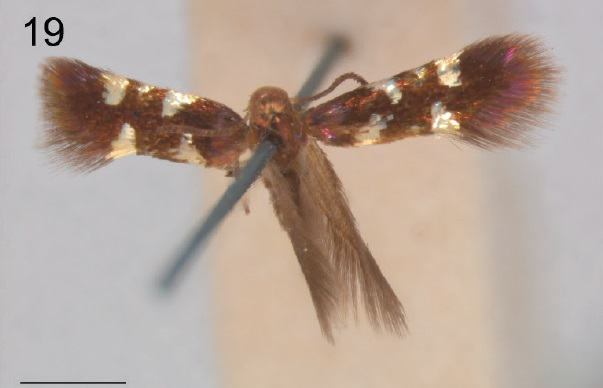

Scientific classification
- Kingdom: Animalia
- Phylum: Arthropoda
- Class: Insecta
- Order: Lepidoptera
- Family: Heliozelidae
- Genus: Antispila
- Species: A. aristarcha

Binomial name
- Antispila aristarcha Meyrick, 1916

= Antispila aristarcha =

Species of moth

Antispila aristarcha is a moth of the family Heliozelidae. It was described by Edward Meyrick in 1916. It is found in India.

The wingspan is 4–5 mm. The forewings are dark bronzy-fuscous. The basal fourth of the wing is shining purplish-coppery. The markings are silvery-metallic. The hindwings are grey.

The larvae feed on Vitis species. They mine the leaves of their host plant. The mine has the form of a transparent blotch. Many larvae are found on a single leaf.
