= Heliozela argyrozona =

Scientific classification
- Kingdom: Animalia
- Phylum: Arthropoda
- Class: Insecta
- Order: Lepidoptera
- Family: Heliozelidae
- Genus: Heliozela
- Species: H. argyrozona

Binomial name
- Heliozela argyrozona (Meyrick, 1918)

Synonyms
- Antispila argyrozona Meyrick, 1918

Species of moth

Heliozela argyrozona is a moth of the family Heliozelidae. It was described in the genus Antispila by Edward Meyrick in 1918 and moved to the genus Heliozela by Erik J. van Nieukerken and Henk Geertsema in 2015. It is found in South Africa.
