= Antispila isorrhythma =

Scientific classification
- Kingdom: Animalia
- Phylum: Arthropoda
- Class: Insecta
- Order: Lepidoptera
- Family: Heliozelidae
- Genus: Antispila
- Species: A. isorrhythma

Binomial name
- Antispila isorrhythma Meyrick, 1926

Species of moth

Antispila isorrhythma is a moth of the family Heliozelidae. It was described by Edward Meyrick in 1926. It is found in India.

The wingspan is about 4 mm. The forewings are grey, irrorated with blackish. The markings are shining white. The hindwings are pale grey.

The larvae feed on Vitis species. They mine the leaves of their host plant.
