= Ischnocanaba =

Scientific classification
- Domain: Eukaryota
- Kingdom: Animalia
- Phylum: Arthropoda
- Class: Insecta
- Order: Lepidoptera
- Family: Heliozelidae
- Genus: Ischnocanaba
- Species: I. euryzona

Binomial name
- Ischnocanaba euryzona Bradley, 1961

Genus of moths

Ischnocanaba is a monotypic moth of the Heliozelidae family described by John David Bradley in 1961. Its only species, Ischnocanaba euryzona, described by the same author in the same year, is found on Guadalcanal.
