= Phanerozela =

Scientific classification
- Kingdom: Animalia
- Phylum: Arthropoda
- Clade: Pancrustacea
- Class: Insecta
- Order: Lepidoptera
- Family: Heliozelidae
- Genus: Phanerozela; Meyrick, 1921
- Species: P. polydora

Binomial name
- Phanerozela polydora Meyrick, 1921

Genus of moths

Phanerozela polydora is a moth of the Heliozelidae family. It was described by Edward Meyrick in 1921. It is found in Brazil. It is the only species in the genus Phanerozela.
