= Monachozela =

Scientific classification
- Kingdom: Animalia
- Phylum: Arthropoda
- Clade: Pancrustacea
- Class: Insecta
- Order: Lepidoptera
- Family: Heliozelidae
- Genus: Monachozela; Meyrick, 1931
- Species: M. neoleuca

Binomial name
- Monachozela neoleuca Meyrick, 1931

Genus of moths

Monachozela neoleuca is a moth of the Heliozelidae family, and the only species in the genus Monachozela. It was described by Edward Meyrick in 1931. It is found in Brazil.
