= Antispila aurirubra =

Scientific classification
- Domain: Eukaryota
- Kingdom: Animalia
- Phylum: Arthropoda
- Class: Insecta
- Order: Lepidoptera
- Family: Heliozelidae
- Genus: Antispila
- Species: A. aurirubra

Binomial name
- Antispila aurirubra Braun, 1915

Species of moth

Antispila aurirubra is a moth of the family Heliozelidae. It was described by Annette Frances Braun in 1915. It is found in the US state of California.

The wingspan is 7–8 mm. The thorax and forewings are lustrous and of varying colour, according to the direction of light ranging from greenish golden to a brilliant reddish bronze. The hindwings are dark gray, but purple toward the apex.

The larvae feed on Cornus species. They mine the leaves of their host plant. The mine has the form of a brownish blotch.
