= Antispila nolckeni =

Scientific classification
- Kingdom: Animalia
- Phylum: Arthropoda
- Clade: Pancrustacea
- Class: Insecta
- Order: Lepidoptera
- Family: Heliozelidae
- Genus: Antispila
- Species: A. nolckeni

Binomial name
- Antispila nolckeni Zeller, 1877

Species of moth

Antispila nolckeni is a moth of the family Heliozelidae. It was described by Philipp Christoph Zeller in 1877. It is found in Colombia.
