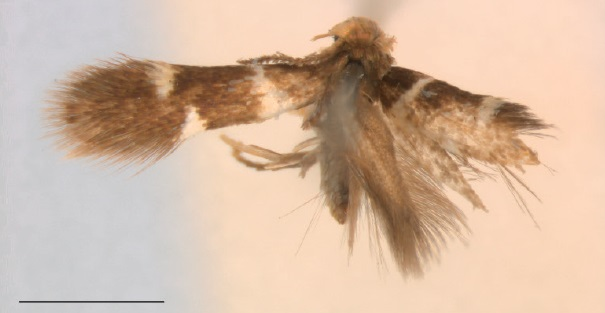

Scientific classification
- Kingdom: Animalia
- Phylum: Arthropoda
- Class: Insecta
- Order: Lepidoptera
- Family: Heliozelidae
- Genus: Holocacista
- Species: H. micrarcha

Binomial name
- Holocacista micrarcha (Meyrick, 1926)

Synonyms
- Antispila micrarcha Meyrick, 1926

= Holocacista micrarcha =

Species of moth

Holocacista micrarcha is a moth of the family Heliozelidae. It was described by Edward Meyrick in 1926. It is found in India.

The larvae feed on Lannea coromandelica.
