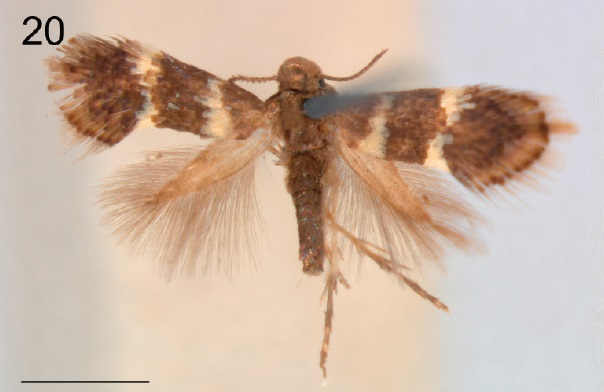

Scientific classification
- Domain: Eukaryota
- Kingdom: Animalia
- Phylum: Arthropoda
- Class: Insecta
- Order: Lepidoptera
- Family: Heliozelidae
- Genus: Heliozela
- Species: H. anna

Binomial name
- Heliozela anna (T. B. Fletcher, 1920)

Synonyms
- Antispila anna T. B. Fletcher, 1920

= Heliozela anna =

Jamun leaf miner

Species of moth

Heliozela anna, the jamun leaf miner, is a moth of the family Heliozelidae. It was described by Thomas Bainbrigge Fletcher in 1920. It is found in India, including Bengal.

The larvae feed on Syzygium cumini. They mine the leaves of their host plant.
