= Holocacista pariodelta =

Scientific classification
- Kingdom: Animalia
- Phylum: Arthropoda
- Class: Insecta
- Order: Lepidoptera
- Family: Heliozelidae
- Genus: Holocacista
- Species: H. pariodelta

Binomial name
- Holocacista pariodelta (Meyrick, 1929)

Synonyms
- Antispila pariodelta Meyrick, 1929

Species of moth

Holocacista pariodelta is a moth of the family Heliozelidae. It was described by Edward Meyrick in 1929. It is found in India.

The larvae feed on Lannea coromandelica. They mine the leaves of their host plant.
