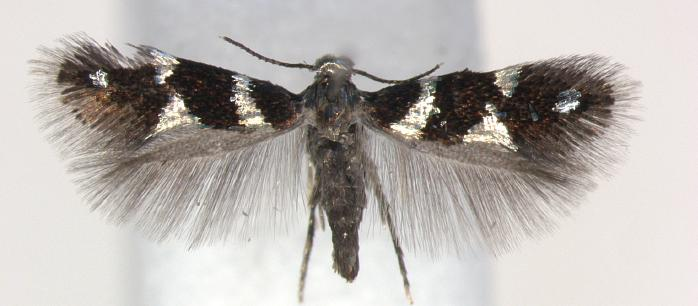
- Adult female Aspilanta oinophylla

Scientific classification
- Kingdom: Animalia
- Phylum: Arthropoda
- Clade: Pancrustacea
- Class: Insecta
- Order: Lepidoptera
- Superfamily: Adeloidea
- Family: Heliozelidae; Heinemann & Wocke, 1876

Genera
- 13, see text

= Heliozelidae =

Family of moths

The Heliozelidae, commonly known as shield-bearer moths, are a family of small, day flying monotrysian moths distributed worldwide. The larvae of most heliozelid species are leaf miners who cut distinctive shield-shaped cases from the surface of the host leaf, hence the common name. Some species are considered pests of commercial crops such as grapevines, cranberries, and walnuts. The taxonomy of this family is poorly understood.

== Classification ==
This family includes the following genera and species:

- Antispila Hübner, 1825
  - A. ampelopsia Kuroko, 1961
  - A. argostoma Meyrick, 1916
  - A. aristarcha Meyrick, 1916
  - A. aurirubra Braun, 1915
  - A. chlorosema Meyrick, 1931
  - A. cleyerella Lee, 2006
  - A. corniella Kuroko, 1961
  - A. cornifoliella Clemens, 1860
  - A. cyclosema Meyrick, 1921
  - A. distyliella Lee, Hirowatari & Kuroko, 2006
  - A. emeishanensis Liao, Yagi, Hirowatari & Huang, 2019
  - A. freemani Lafontaine, 1973
  - A. grimella (Hübner, 1824)
  - A. hikosana Kuroko, 1961
  - A. inouei Kuroko, 1987
  - A. isabella Clemens, 1860
  - A. isorrhythma Meyrick, 1926
  - A. iviella Kuroko, 1961
  - A. kunyuensis Wang, Liu, Xu & Jiang, 2018
  - A. longcangensis Liao, Yagi, Hirowatari & Huang, 2019
  - A. merinaella Paulian & Viette, 1955
  - A. mesogramma Meyrick, 1921
  - A. metallella (Denis & Schiffermüller, 1775)
  - A. nolckeni Zeller, 1877
  - A. nyssaefoliella Clemens, 1860
  - A. orbiculella Kuroko, 1961
  - A. orthodelta Meyrick, 1931
  - A. pentalitha Meyrick, 1916
  - A. petryi Martini, 1899
  - A. postscripta Meyrick, 1921
  - A. praecincta Meyrick, 1921
  - A. purplella Kuroko, 1961
  - A. sinensis Liu & Wang, 2017
  - A. stachjanella Dziurzynski, 1948
  - A. tateshinensis Kuroko, 1987
  - A. trypherantis Meyrick, 1916
  - A. uenoi Kuroko, 1987
- Antispilina Hering, 1941
  - A. ludwigi Hering, 1941
- Aspilanta van Nieukerken & Eiseman, 2020
  - A. ampelopsifoliella (Chambers, 1874)
  - A. argentifera (Braun, 1927)
  - A. hydrangaeella (Chambers, 1874)
  - A. oinophylla (van Nieukerken & Wagner, 2012)
  - A. viticordifoliella (Clemens, 1860)
  - A. voraginella (Braun, 1927)
- Coptodisca Walsingham, 1895
  - C. arbutiella Busck, 1904
  - C. cercocarpella Braun, 1925
  - C. condaliae Busck, 1900
  - C. diospyriella (Chambers, 1874)
  - C. ella (Chambers, 1871)
  - C. juglandella (Chambers, 1874)
  - C. juglandiella (Chambers, 1874)
  - C. kalmiella Dietz, 1921
  - C. lucifluella (Clemens, 1860)
  - C. magnella Braun, 1916
  - C. matheri Lafontaine, 1974
  - C. negligens Braun, 1920
  - C. ostryaefoliella (Clemens, 1861)
  - C. powellella Opler, 1971
  - C. quercicolella Braun, 1927
  - C. rhizophorae Walsingham, 1897
  - C. ribesella Braun, 1925
  - C. saliciella (Clemens, 1861)
  - C. splendoriferella (Clemens, 1860)
- Heliozela Herrich-Schäffer, 1853
  - H. aesella (Chambers, 1877)
  - H. ahenea (Walsingham, 1897)
  - H. anantia (Meyrick, 1897)
  - H. anna (Fletcher, 1920)
  - H. argyrozona (Meyrick, 1918)
  - H. autogenes Meyrick, 1897
  - H. castaneella Inoue, 1982
  - H. catoptrias Meyrick, 1897
  - H. crypsimetalla Meyrick, 1897
  - H. cuprea (Walsingham, 1897)
  - H. eucarpa Meyrick, 1897
  - H. eugeniella (Busck, 1900)
  - H. gracilis (Zeller, 1873)
  - H. hammoniella Sorhagen, 1885
  - H. isochroa Meyrick, 1897
  - H. lithargyrella Zeller, 1850
  - H. microphylla Meyrick, 1897
  - H. nephelitis Meyrick, 1897
  - H. praeustella (Deventer, 1904)
  - H. prodela Meyrick, 1897
  - H. resplendella Stainton, 1851
  - H. rutilella (Walker, 1864)
  - H. sericiella Haworth
  - H. siderias Meyrick, 1897
  - H. sobrinella (Deventer, 1904)
  - H. subpurpurea (Meyrick, 1934)
  - H. trisphaera Meyrick, 1897
- Holocacista Walsingham & Durrant, 1909
  - H. capensis van Nieukerken & Geertsema, 2015
  - H. micrarcha (Meyrick, 1926)
  - H. pariodelta (Meyrick, 1929)
  - H. rivillei (Stainton, 1855)
  - H. salutans (Meyrick, 1921)
  - H. selastis (Meyrick, 1926)
  - H. varii (Mey, 2011)
- Hoplophanes Meyrick, 1897
  - H. acrozona Meyrick, 1897
  - H. aglaodora (Meyrick, 1897)
  - H. argochalca (Meyrick, 1897)
  - H. chalcolitha Meyrick, 1897
  - H. chalcopetala (Meyrick, 1897)
  - H. chalcophaedra Meyrick, 1897
  - H. chlorochrysa Meyrick, 1897
  - H. electritis Meyrick, 1897
  - H. haplochrysa Meyrick, 1897
  - H. hemiphragma Meyrick, 1897
  - H. heterospila Meyrick, 1897
  - H. memoranda Meyrick, 1897
  - H. monosema Meyrick, 1897
  - H. niphochalca Meyrick, 1897
  - H. panchalca Meyrick, 1897
  - H. peristera Meyrick, 1897
  - H. phaeochalca Meyrick, 1897
  - H. philomacha Meyrick, 1897
  - H. porphyropla Meyrick, 1897
  - H. semicuprea Meyrick, 1897
  - H. tritocosma Meyrick, 1897
- Ischnocanaba Bradley, 1961
  - I. euryzona Bradley, 1961
- Lamprozela Meyrick, 1916
  - L. desmophanes (Meyrick, 1922)
  - L. metadesmia (Meyrick, 1934)
- Monachozela Meyrick, 1931
  - M. neoleuca Meyrick, 1931
- Phanerozela Meyrick, 1921
  - P. polydora Meyrick, 1921
- Pseliastis Meyrick, 1897
  - P. spectropa Meyrick, 1897
  - P. trizona Meyrick, 1897
  - P. xanthodisca Meyrick, 1897
- Tyriozela Meyrick, 1931
  - T. porphyrogona Meyrick, 1931
