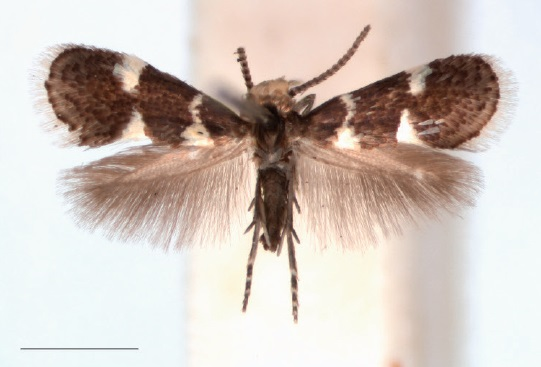

Scientific classification
- Kingdom: Animalia
- Phylum: Arthropoda
- Class: Insecta
- Order: Lepidoptera
- Family: Heliozelidae
- Genus: Holocacista
- Species: H. salutans

Binomial name
- Holocacista salutans (Meyrick, 1921)

Synonyms
- Antispila salutans Meyrick, 1921

= Holocacista salutans =

Species of moth

Holocacista salutans is a moth of the family Heliozelidae. It was described by Edward Meyrick in 1921. It is found in Zimbabwe and the South African provinces of KwaZulu-Natal and Limpopo.

The wingspan is 4–5 mm for males and about 4.5 mm for females. The forewings of the males are grey brown, slightly irrorate (sprinkled), caused by the scales being dark tipped and paler at the base. There is a silver-white pattern on the forewings, consisting of a triangular dorsal spot at one-fourth from the base, a smaller spot at the costa, sometimes joined to the dorsal spot as a narrow fascia. There is a second triangular dorsal spot at one-half, reaching almost to the middle of the wing and a triangular costal spot just beyond the middle, always separate. The hindwings are pale grey. Females have the scales almost uniformly dark fuscous with a purplish tinge, resulting in darker, velvety wing colour and contrasting silvery-white pattern. The first costal and dorsal spots are always joined to form a narrow fascia, wider at the dorsum. The second dorsal and costal spots are as in males. There are probably multiple overlapping generations.

The larvae feed on Rhoicissus digitata, Rhoicissus revoilii, Rhoicissus tomentosa and Cissus cornifolia. The larvae mine the leaves of their host plant. The mine starts as a much contorted narrow gallery with all convolutions close to each other, hardly leaving leaf tissue between them. Later, the mine enlarges into an irregular wide gallery or a blotch. The frass is black throughout, clumped and almost filling the gallery, but with space between the clumps. Mines are very often clustered in groups. The larva cuts out an elliptic case of about 3 mm long and 2 mm wide. Larvae have been found from March to June, in September and again from December to January.

== Life cycle ==
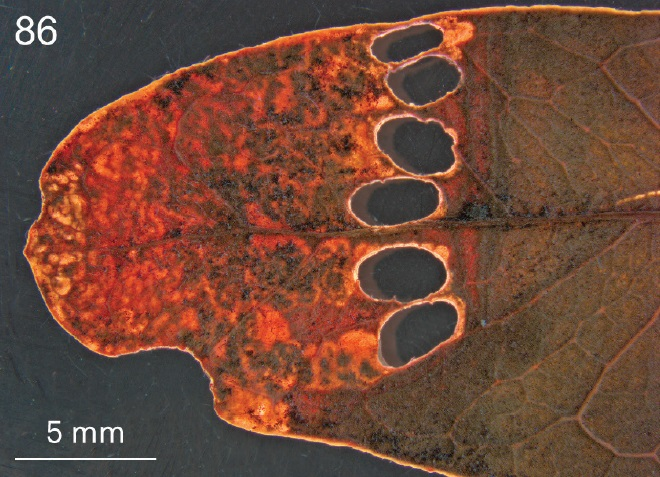
Leafmine on Rhoicissus digitata

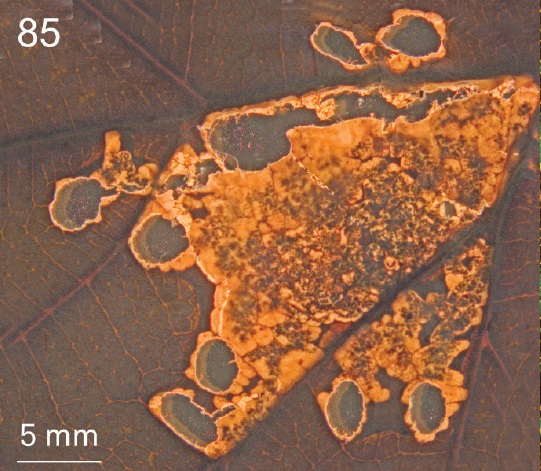
Leafmine on Rhoicissus tomentosa
