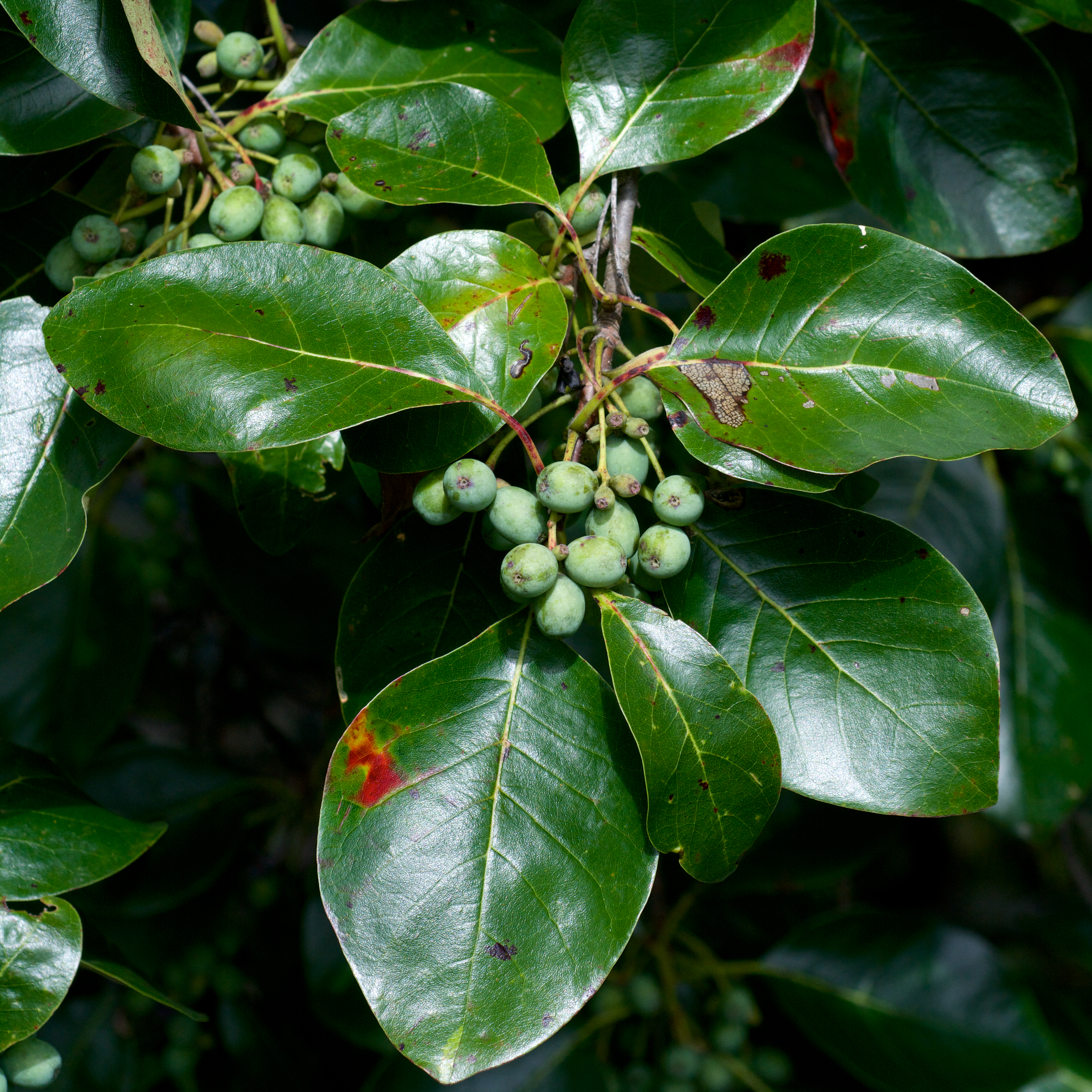
- Foliage and almost mature fruit

Conservation status
- Least Concern (IUCN 3.1)

Scientific classification
- Kingdom: Plantae
- Clade: Embryophytes
- Clade: Tracheophytes
- Clade: Spermatophytes
- Clade: Angiosperms
- Clade: Eudicots
- Clade: Asterids
- Order: Cornales
- Family: Nyssaceae
- Genus: Nyssa
- Species: N. sylvatica

Binomial name
- Nyssa sylvatica Marshall
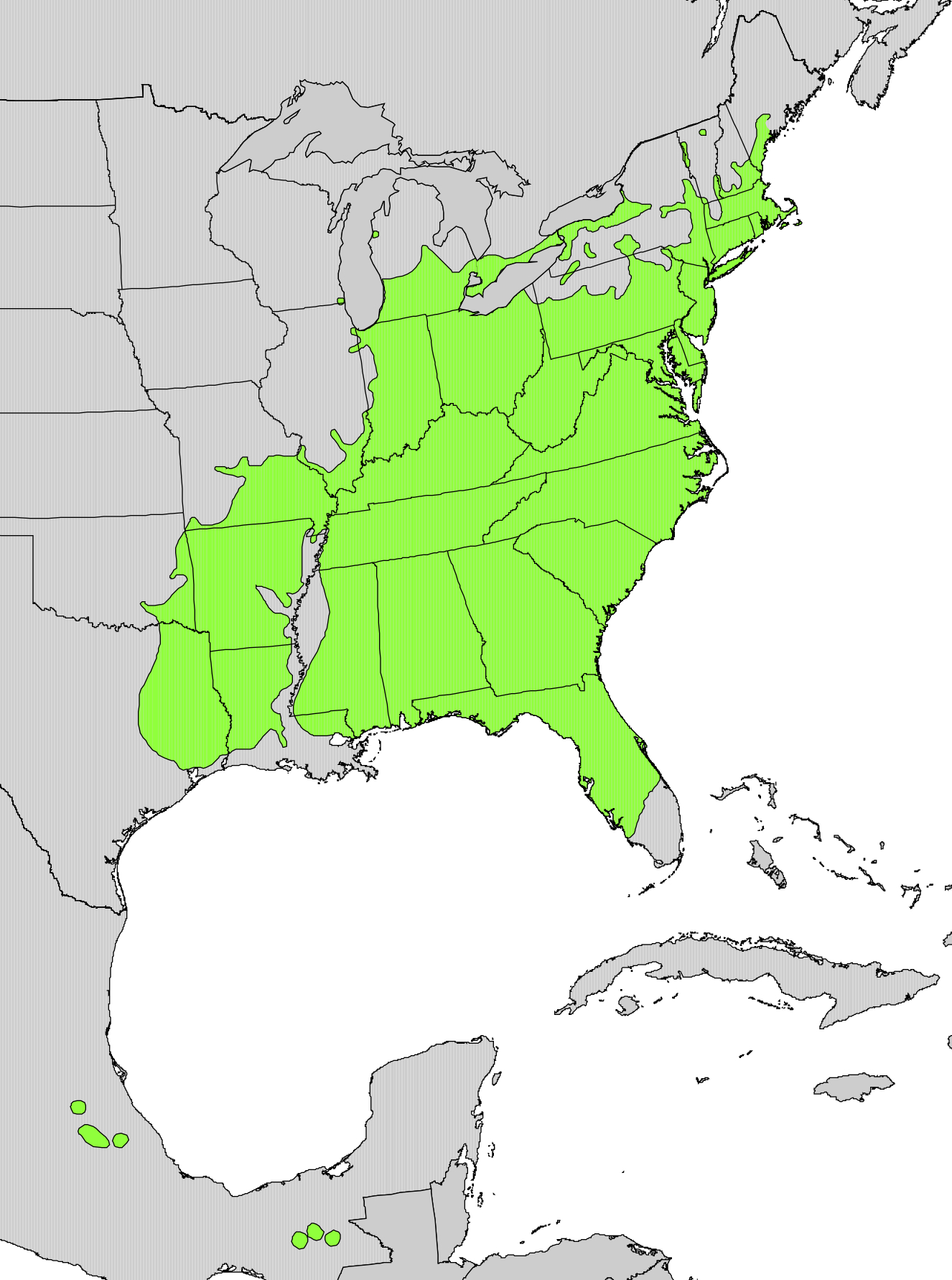
- Natural range

= Nyssa sylvatica =

Tupelo

Species of tree

Nyssa sylvatica, commonly known as tupelo, black tupelo, black gum or sour gum, (Note: It is also referred to as blackgum or sourgum.) is a medium-sized deciduous tree native to eastern North America from the coastal Northeastern United States and southern Ontario south to central Florida and eastern Texas, as well as Mexico.

== Names ==
Nyssa sylvatica's genus name, Nyssa, refers to a Greek water nymph; the species epithet sylvatica refers to its woodland habitat.

The species' common name, tupelo, is of Native American origin, coming from the Creek words ito "tree" and opilwa "swamp"; it was in use by the mid-18th century.

While these trees are often known as simply "tupelo", the fuller name, black tupelo, helps distinguish it from the other species of the tupelo genus Nyssa, some of which have overlapping ranges, such as water tupelo (N. aquatica) and swamp tupelo (N. biflora). The name "tupelo" is used primarily in the American South; northward and in Appalachia, the tree is more commonly called the black gum or the sour gum, although no part of the plant is particularly gummy. Both of these names contrast it with a different tree species with a broadly overlapping range, the sweet gum (Liquidambar styraciflua), which does produce an aromatic resin. Another common name used occasionally in the Northeast is pepperidge.

In Appalachia, the frequent variant is Nyssa sylvatica var. caroliniana, which is sometimes called the Yellow Gum. Its leaflets are thinner and less glossy, "with rather long tips, the under surface persistently somewhat downy and covered with minute warty excrescences easily seen under an ordinary hand lens" "Yellow Gum is not a swamp tree, like Black Gum, but an inhabitant of dry land, hills, and the coves of the southern Appalachians which it ascends to 3,500 ft (1,100 m).

On Martha's Vineyard, in Massachusetts, this species is called "beetlebung", perhaps for its use in making the mallet known as a beetle, used for hammering bungs (stoppers) into barrels.

== Description ==
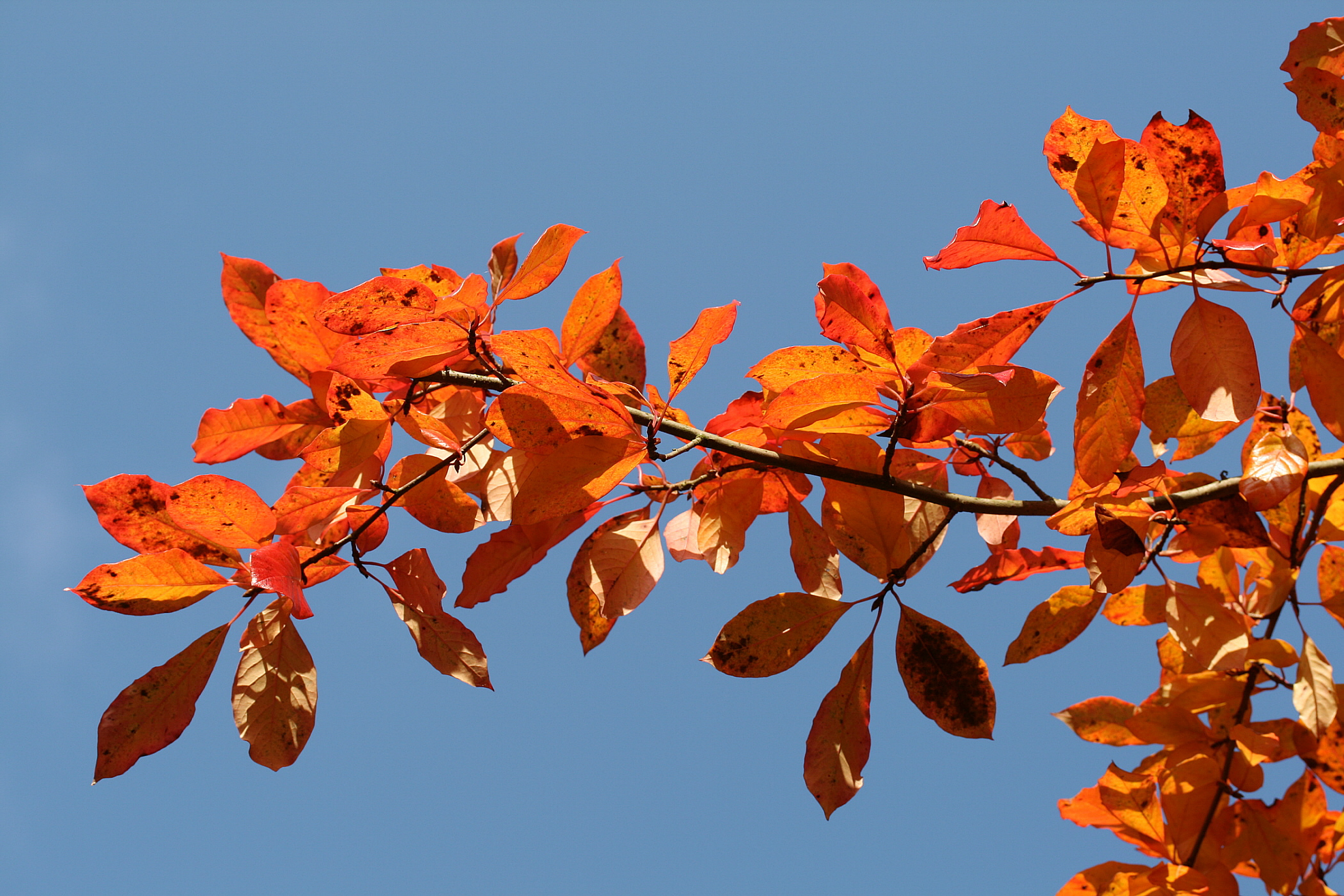
Leaves in the autumn

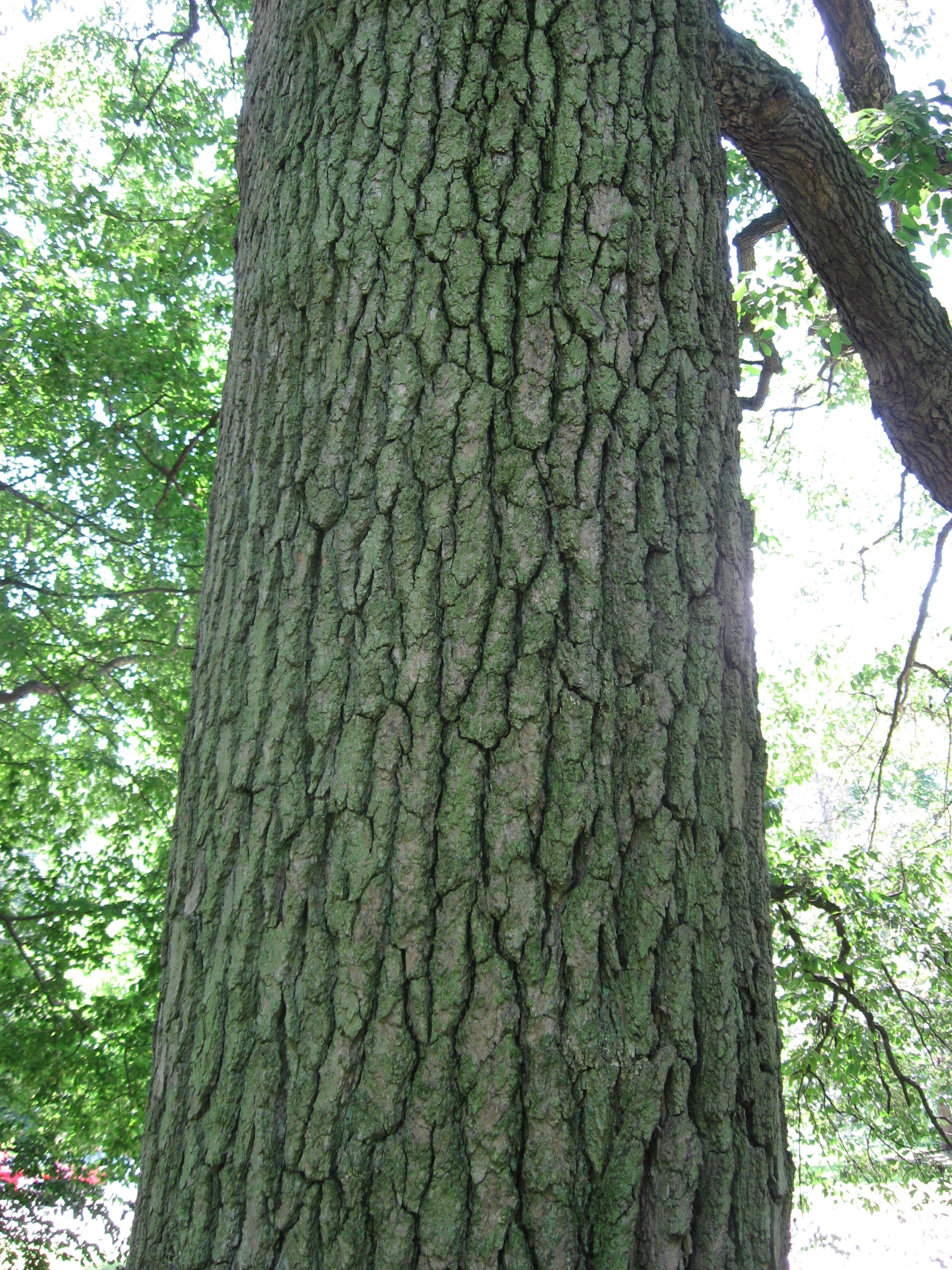
Trunk of a mature tree

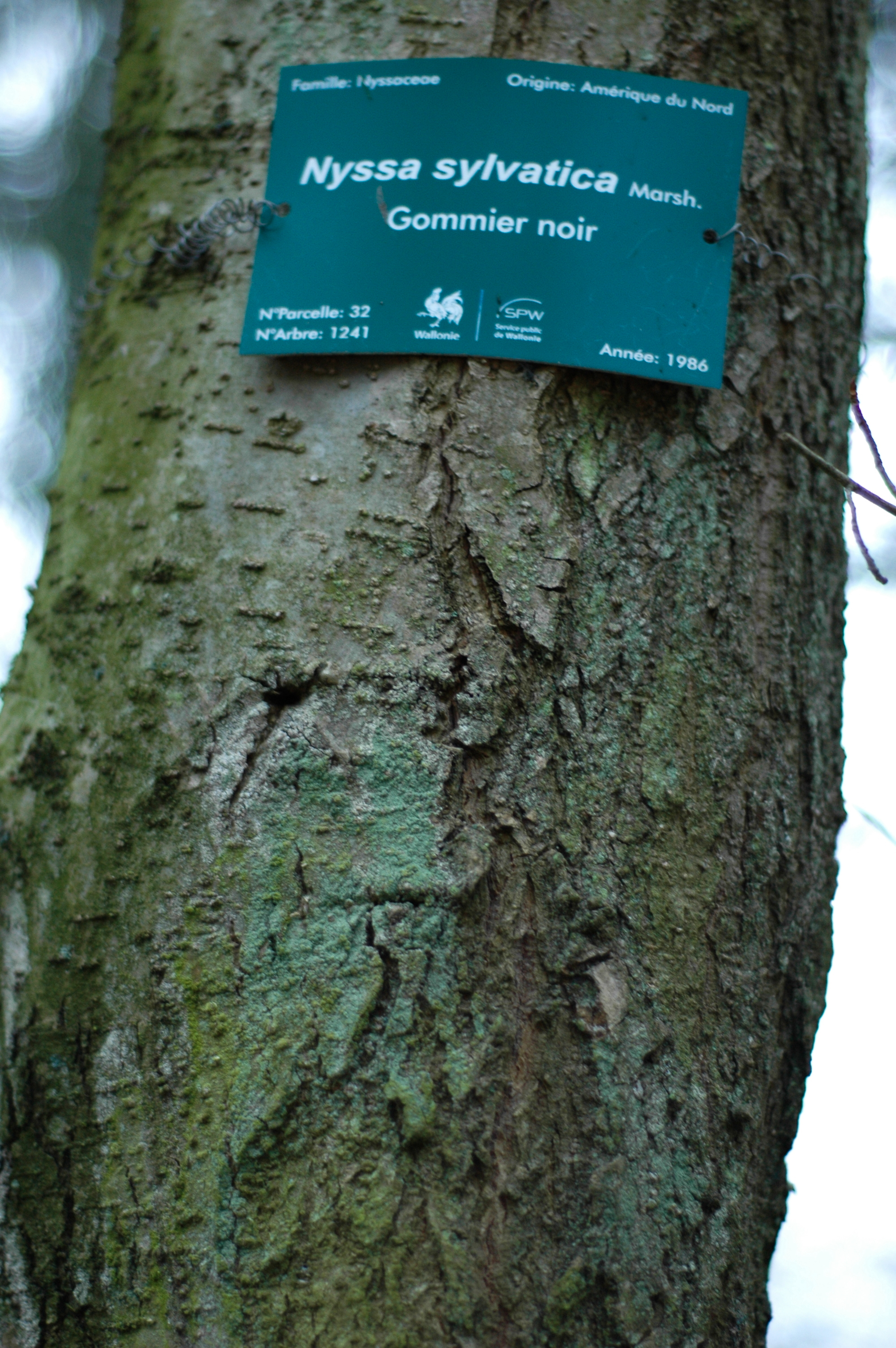
Bark on younger tree

Nyssa sylvatica grows to 20–25 meters (66–82 ft) tall, rarely to 35 meters (115 ft), with a trunk diameter of 50–100 centimeters (20–39 in), rarely up to 170 cm (67 in). These trees typically have a straight trunk with the branches extending outward at right angles. The bark is dark gray and flaky when young, but it becomes furrowed with age, resembling alligator hide on very old stems. The twigs of this tree are reddish-brown, usually hidden by a greyish skin. The pith is chambered with greenish partitions.

The leaves vary in size and shape. They can be oval, elliptical, or obovate, and 5–12 cm (2–4.5 in) long. They have lustrous upper surfaces, with entire, often wavy margins. The foliage turns purple in autumn, eventually becoming an intense bright scarlet. Deer are extremely fond of the leaves on seedlings and saplings, to the point where large populations of them can make establishment of the tree almost impossible. For comparison, mature trees are largely left alone.

The flowers are very small, in greenish-white in clusters at the top of a long stalk and a rich source of nectar for bees. They are often dioecious so a male and female tree in proximity is required to set seed, however, many trees are also polygamo-dioecious, which means they have both male and female flowers on the same tree. The fruit is a black-blue, ovoid stone fruit, about 10 mm long with a thin, oily, bitter-to-sour tasting flesh and very popular with small bird species. There are from one to three fruits together on a long slender stalk. They are a valuable energy food for birds, especially the American robin.

Nyssa sylvatica forms a large deep taproot when young that makes transplanting difficult. Because of this, it is fairly uncommon in cultivation and the nursery trade.

Additional characteristics include:

- Bark: Light reddish brown, deeply furrowed and scaly. Branchlets at first pale green to orange, sometimes smooth, often downy, later dark brown.
- Wood: Pale yellow, sapwood white; heavy, strong, very tough, hard to split, not durable in contact with the soil. Used for turnery. Sp. gr., 0.6353; weight of cu. ft., 39.59.
- Winter buds: Dark red, obtuse, one-fourth of an inch long. Inner scales enlarge with the growing shoot, becoming red before they fall.
- Leaves: Alternate, often crowded at the end of the lateral branches, simple, linear, oblong to oval, two to five inches (127 mm) long, one-half to three inches (76 mm) broad, wedge-shaped or rounded at base, entire, with margin slightly thickened, acute or acuminate. They come out of the bud conduplicate, coated beneath with rusty tomentum, when full grown are thick, dark green, very shining above, pale and often hairy beneath. Feather-veined, midrib and primary veins prominent beneath. In autumn they turn bright scarlet, or yellow and scarlet. Petioles one-quarter to one-half an inch long, slender or stout, terete or margined, often red.
- Flowers: May, June, when leaves are half grown. Polygamodiœcious, yellowish green, borne on slender downy peduncles. Staminate in many-flowered heads; pistillate in two to several flowered clusters.
- Calyx: Cup-shaped, five-toothed.
- Corolla: Petals five, imbricate in bud, yellow green, ovate, thick, slightly spreading, inserted on the margin of the conspicuous disk.
- Stamens: Five to twelve. In staminate flowers exserted, in pistillate short, often wanting.
- Pistil: Ovary inferior, one to two-celled; style stout, exserted, reflexed above the middle. Entirely wanting in sterile flower. Ovules, one in each cell.
- Fruit: Fleshy drupe, one to three from each flower cluster. Ovoid, two-thirds of an inch long, dark blue, acid. Stone more or less ridged. October.

== Distribution and habitat ==
Nyssa sylvatica grows in various uplands and in alluvial stream bottoms from southwestern Maine and New York, to extreme southern Ontario, central Michigan, Illinois, and central Missouri, south to southern Florida, eastern Texas, and eastern Oklahoma. Optimum development is made on lower slopes and terraces in the Southeastern United States. It also occurs locally in the mountains of eastern and southern Mexico, where it is found in the southern Sierra Madre Oriental and Sierra Madre de Oaxaca of Hidalgo, Puebla, and Veracruz states and the Chiapas Highlands of Chiapas.

Nyssa sylvatica is found in a wide range of climates, including upland and wetland habitats, in its extensive range. It commonly grows in both the creek bottoms of the southern coastal plains, to altitudes of about 900 m (3,000 ft) in the Southern Appalachians. These trees grow best on well-drained, light-textured soils on the low ridges of second bottoms and on the high flats of silty alluvium. In the uplands it grows best on the loams and clay loams of lower slopes and coves.

The species occurs in 35 different forest cover types. When found on drier upper slopes and ridges, it is seldom of log size or quality.

In Mexico it is a common species in montane cloud forests, particularly in moist or riparian habitats, between 1,000 and 2,200 m (3,300 and 7,200 ft) in elevation.

== Ecology ==
The flowers are an important source of nectar and its fruits are important to many birds and mammals. Hollow trunks provide nesting or denning opportunities for bees and various mammals. It is among the longest living non-clonal flowering plants in eastern North America, capable of obtaining ages of over 650 years.

=== Wildlife ===
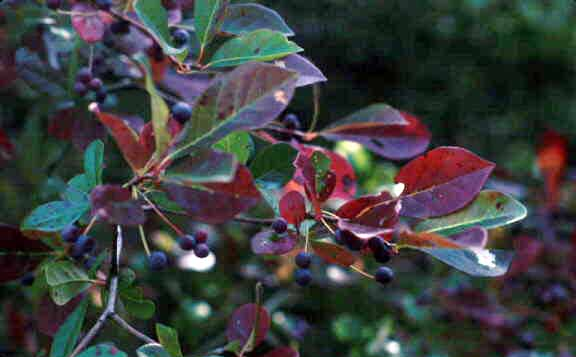
Plant showing autumn coloring and mature fruit

Nyssa sylvatica is an important food source for many migrating birds in the fall [autumn]. Its early color change (foliar fruit flagging) is thought to attract birds to the available fruit, which ripen before many other fall fruits and berries. The fruit is quite marked, dark blue, in clusters of two or three. The sour fruits are eagerly sought by many kinds of birds, including: American robin, Swainson's thrush, gray-cheeked thrush, hermit thrush, wood thrush, northern cardinal, northern mockingbird, blue jay, red-bellied woodpecker, yellow-bellied sapsucker, northern flicker, pileated woodpecker, eastern phoebe, brown thrasher, eastern bluebird, European starling, scarlet tanager, gray catbird, cedar waxwing, and American crow, all primarily eastern North American birds migrating or residing year-round within the tree's range.

The limbs of these trees often deteriorate early, and the decayed holes make excellent dens for squirrels, raccoons, Virginia opossums, as well as nesting sites for feral honeybees.

The leaves are mined by larvae of the tupelo leafminer moth and eaten by forest tent caterpillars.

== Uses ==
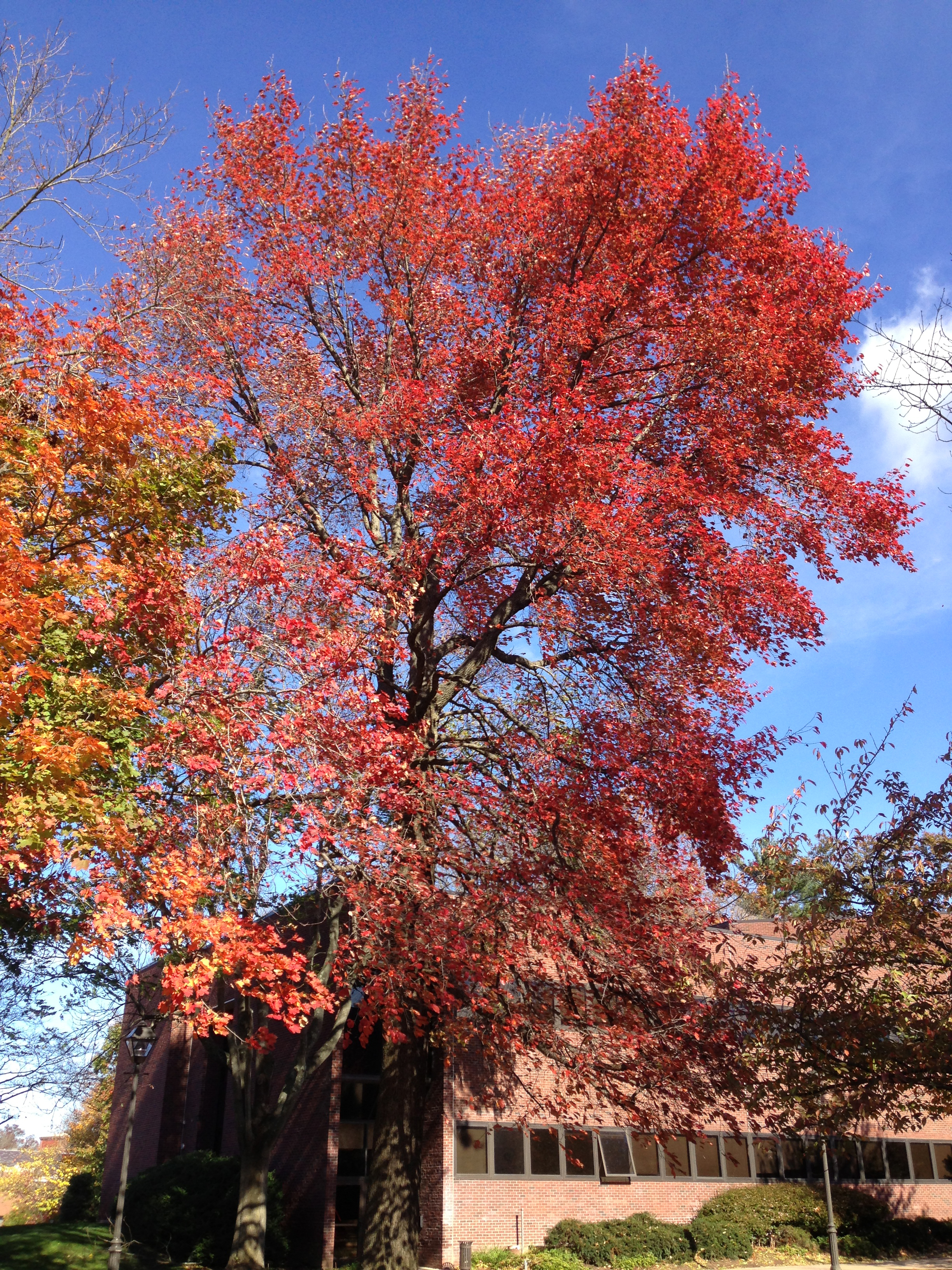
Tree in autumn

=== Cultivation ===
Nyssa sylvatica is cultivated as an ornamental tree in parks and large gardens, where it is often used as a specimen or shade tree. The tree is best when grown in sheltered but not crowded positions, developing a pyramidal shape in youth, and spreading with age. The stem rises to the summit of the tree in one tapering unbroken shaft, the branches come out at right angles to the trunk and either extend horizontally or droop a little, making a long-narrow, cone-like head.

The leaves are short-petioled and so have little individual motion, but the branches sway as a whole. The spray is fine and abundant and lies horizontally so that the foliage arrangement is not unlike that of the beech (Fagus). Its often spectacular autumnal coloring, with intense reds to purples, is highly valued in landscape settings. It is claimed to be the most fiery and brilliant of the 'brilliant group' that includes maple, dogwood, sassafras, and sweet gum, as well as various species of tupelo.

In the UK the cultivar 'Wisley Bonfire' has gained the Royal Horticultural Society's Award of Garden Merit.

=== Honey production ===
Nyssa sylvatica is a major source of wild honey in many areas within its range. Hollow sections of black gum trunks were formerly used as bee gums by beekeepers.

=== Wood ===
The wood of Nyssa sylvatica is heavy, hard, cross-grained, and difficult to split, especially after drying. This resistance to splitting led to its use for making mauls, pulleys, wheel hubs, agricultural rollers, bowls, and paving blocks. The wood is also used for pallets, rough floors, pulpwood, and firewood. Since the wood is very tough and resistant to wear, it has been used for shuttles in weaving. Because it is resistant to wear and very readily accepts creosote-based preservatives it is considered to be a premier wood for making railroad ties. The wood's resistance to wear and some acids has led to its use as factory flooring.

=== Teeth-cleaning twig ===
Because of the fibers and hardiness of Nyssa sylvatica twigs, they were in used in folk medicine as a teeth-cleaning twig.
