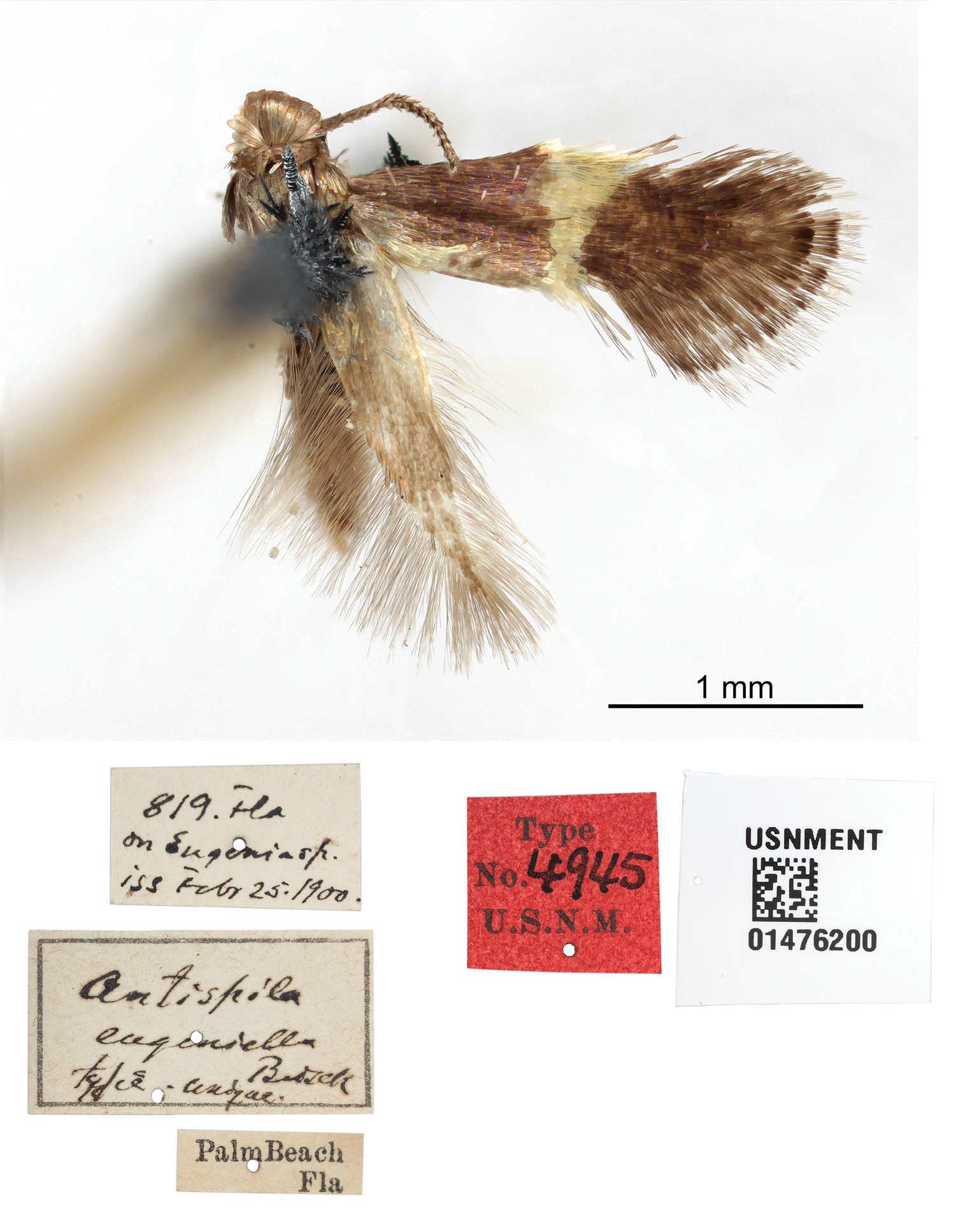
- Holotype specimen of H. eugeniella

Scientific classification
- Kingdom: Animalia
- Phylum: Arthropoda
- Class: Insecta
- Order: Lepidoptera
- Family: Heliozelidae
- Genus: Heliozela
- Species: H. eugeniella

Binomial name
- Heliozela eugeniella (Busck, 1900)

Synonyms
- Antispila eugeniella Busck, 1900

= Heliozela eugeniella =

Species of moth

Heliozela eugeniella is a species of moth in the family Heliozelidae. It was described by August Busck in 1900 and is known only from Florida.

== Description ==
The wingspan of the adult moth is 3.8 mm (0.15 in). The head, thorax, and forewings are shining dark purple and the hindwings are dark gray. There is a golden-metallic band on the middle of the forewing. The larvae are leaf miners that feed on Eugenia species, forming an upper blotch mine. When ready to pupate the larva cuts out an oval case which falls to the ground.
