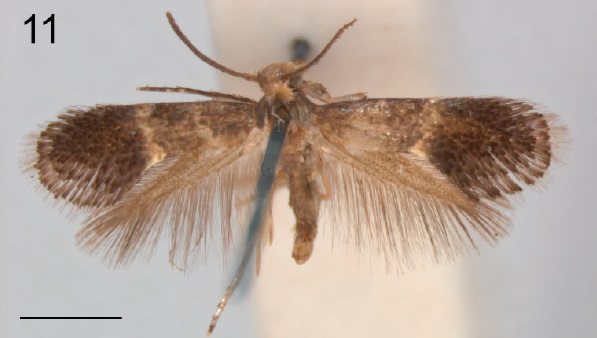

Scientific classification
- Kingdom: Animalia
- Phylum: Arthropoda
- Class: Insecta
- Order: Lepidoptera
- Family: Heliozelidae
- Genus: Holocacista
- Species: H. selastis

Binomial name
- Holocacista selastis (Meyrick, 1926)

Synonyms
- Antispila selastis Meyrick, 1926

= Holocacista selastis =

Species of moth

Holocacista selastis is a moth of the family Heliozelidae. It was described by Edward Meyrick in 1926. It is found in India.

The larvae feed on Psychotria dalzelii.
