= Vitis coignetiae =

Crimson glory vine
- Vitis coignetiae leaves

Scientific classification
- Kingdom: Plantae
- Clade: Tracheophytes
- Clade: Angiosperms
- Clade: Eudicots
- Clade: Rosids
- Order: Vitales
- Family: Vitaceae
- Genus: Vitis
- Species: V. coignetiae

Binomial name
- Vitis coignetiae Pulliat ex Planch.

Varieties
- V. coignetiae var. coignetiae; V. coignetiae var. glabrescens Nakai

Synonyms
- V. amurensis var. glabrescens (Nakai) Nakai [possibly syn. of V. coignetiae var. glabrescens, not V. coignetiae]

Species of grapevine

Vitis coignetiae, commonly called crimson glory vine, is a species of grapevine belonging to the family Vitaceae. Is native to the temperate climes of Asia and can be found in the Russian Far East (Sakhalin), Korea, and Japan (Hokkaido, Honshu, Shikoku). It was described botanically in 1883. It is called meoru (머루) in Korean and yama-budo (ヤマブドウ) in Japanese.

== History ==
The species name is dedicated to Marie Coignet, née Sisley, who reportedly brought seeds back from a trip to Japan with her husband in 1875.

This vine was also reported in 1884 snowy regions of Japan by Henri Degron sent to East Asia to seek wild vines resistant to Phylloxera. Degron sent specimens to a Professor Planchon of Montpellier who named them Vitis coignetiae but did not retain them due to their low resistance to phylloxera. Degron planted a vineyard in Crespières, Île-de-France where one of the vines reached a length of 32.8 meters and a height of 2.8 meter. In the cooler Norman climate the vine produces a bitter wine, rich in color and extract.

== Description ==
The vine is very vigorous, with grey-brown, tomentose shoots. The deciduous leaves are large (10-25 cm in diameter), simple, orbicular, toothed, with 5-15 cm long petiole. Dark green during the growing season, they turn red-orange in autumn.

Wild vines can be male, female or hermaphrodite. Clusters are large with small, purple-black, seeded berries. It is found in the mountainous regions of Japan and up to 1300 m altitude in Korea.

== Uses ==
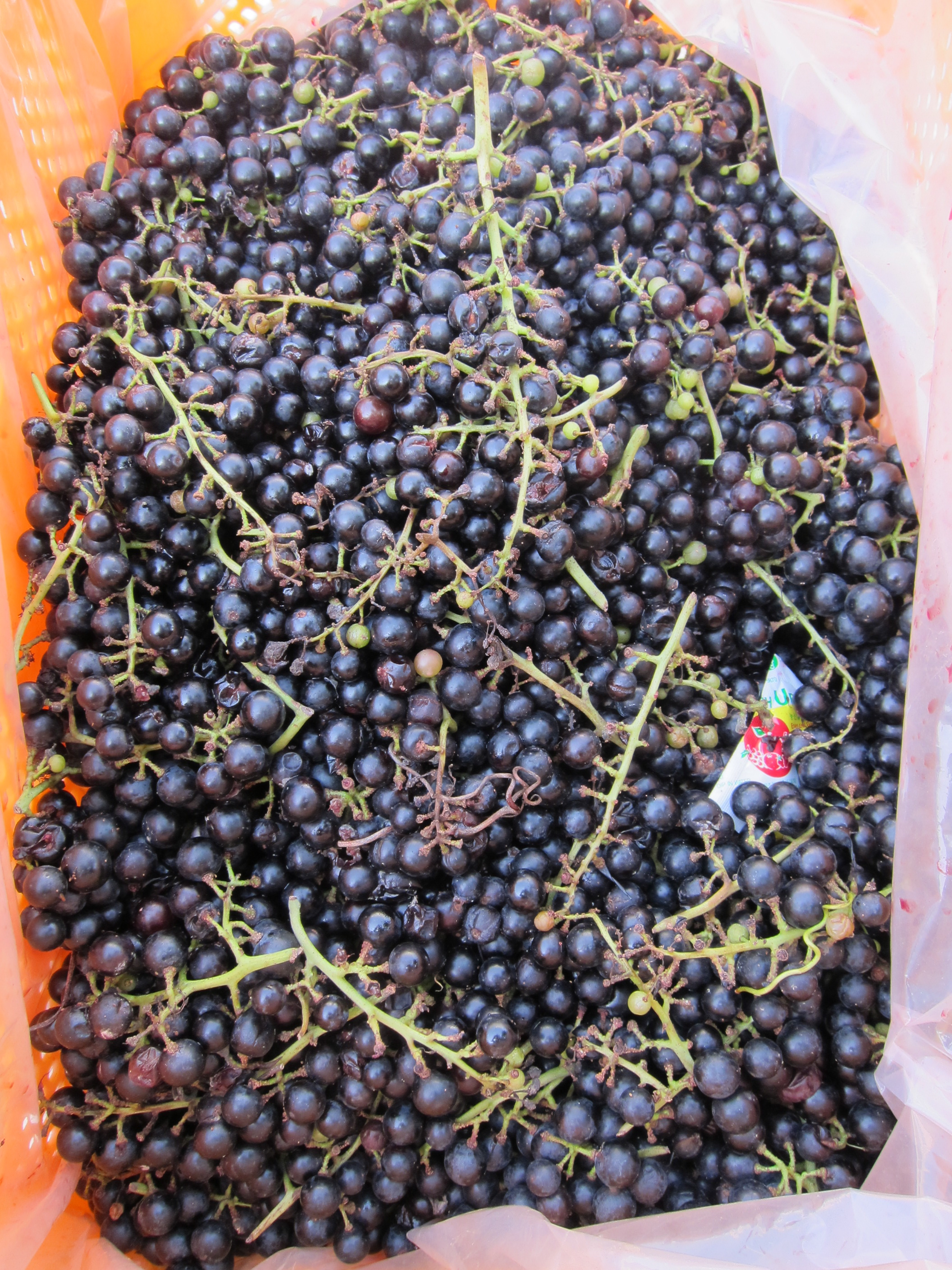
Crimson gloryvine fruits, sold in Mungyeong, Korea

In East Asia it is grown as an ornamental plant for its crimson autumn foliage; and as a traditional medicine.

It is a recipient of the Royal Horticultural Society's Award of Garden Merit.

It is used to produce wines in Korea and Japan. These are at first bitter, but softened with the addition of sugar.

== Chemistry ==
The plant contains the stilbenoids ε-viniferin and rhapontigenin.

== Gallery ==
Vitis coignetiae

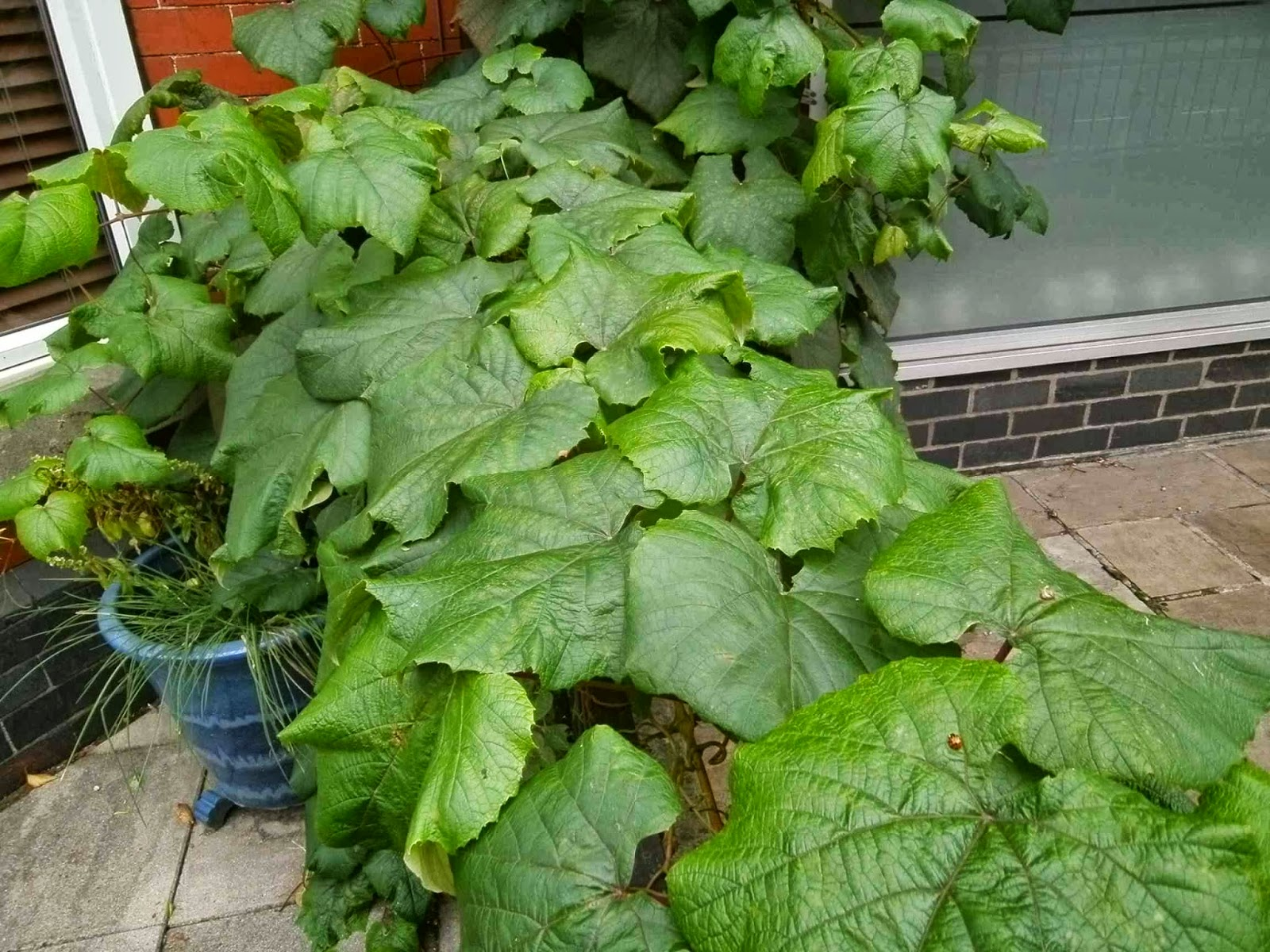
Vitis coignetiae leaves.

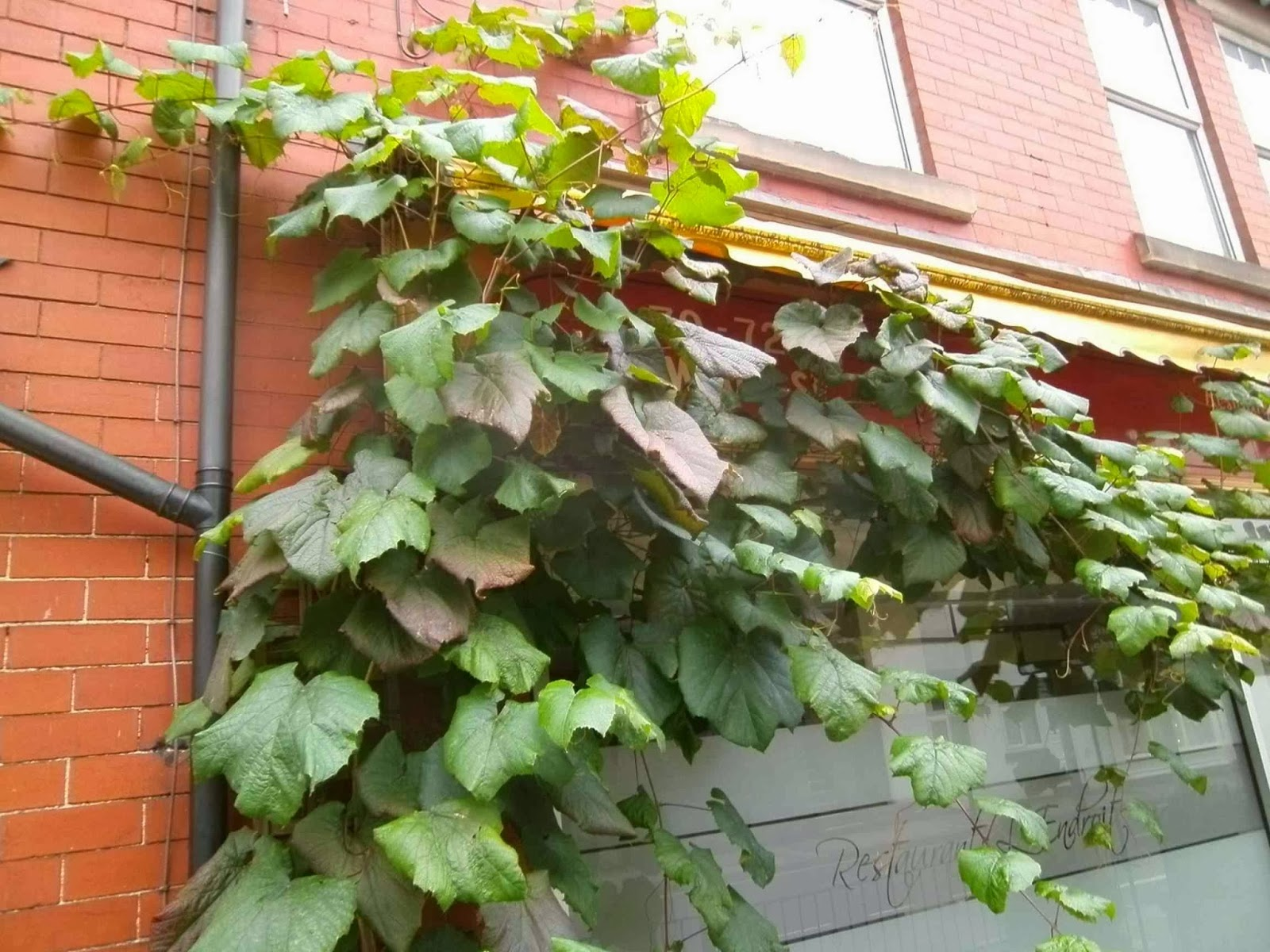
Vitis coignetiae vine growing in Cheshire, United Kingdom.

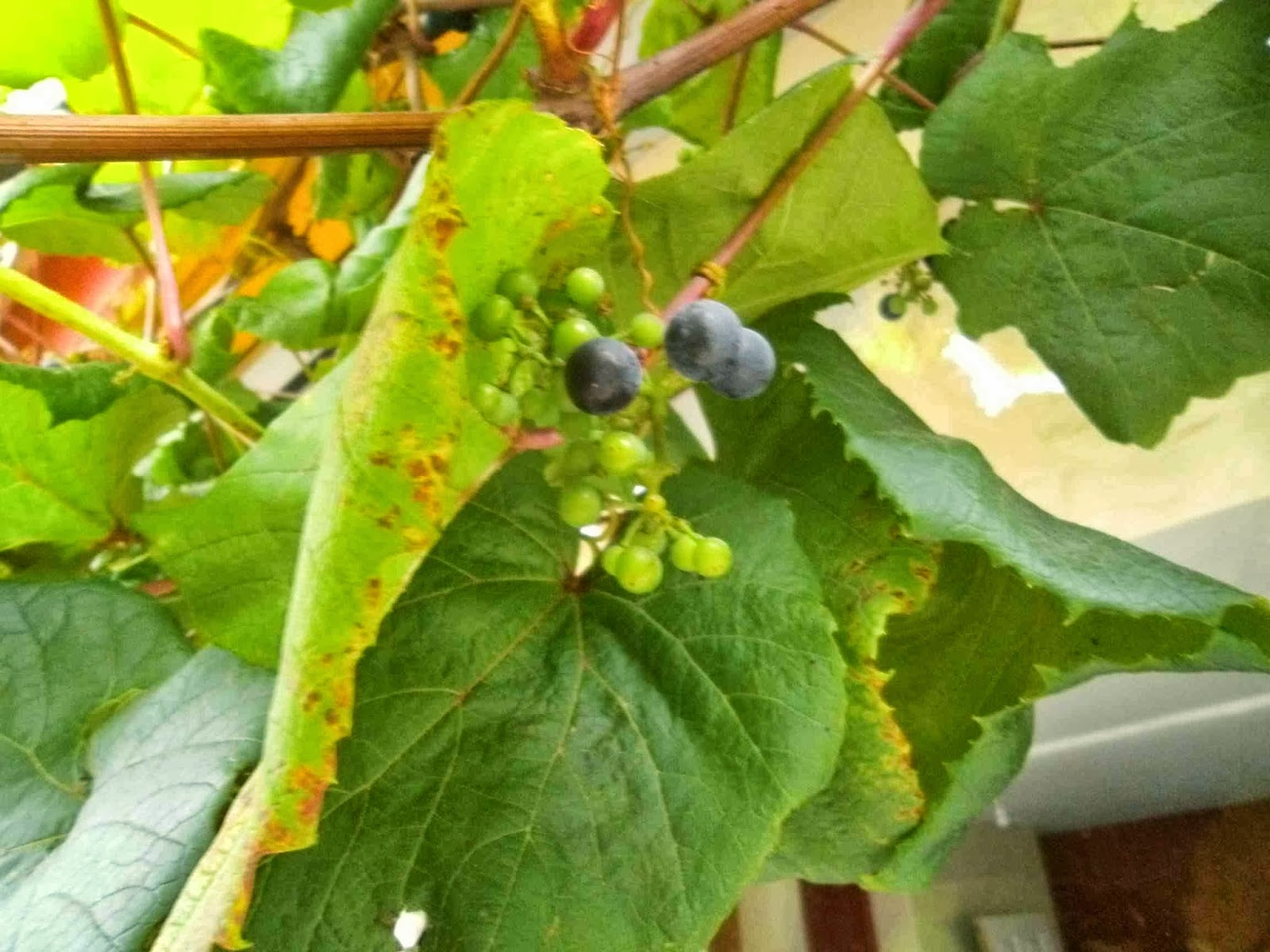
Vitis coignetiae fruit cluster.

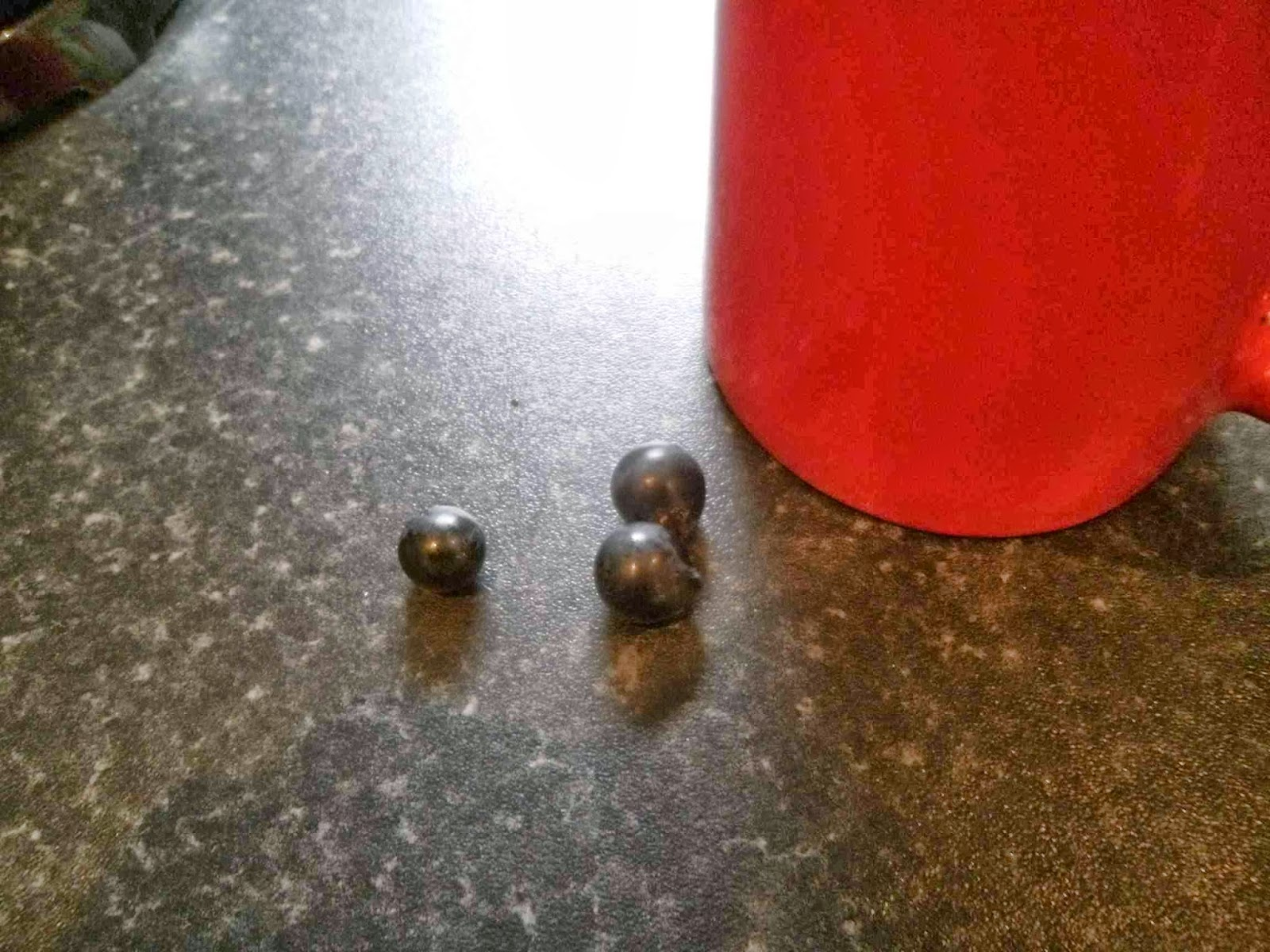
Vitis coignetiae berries.

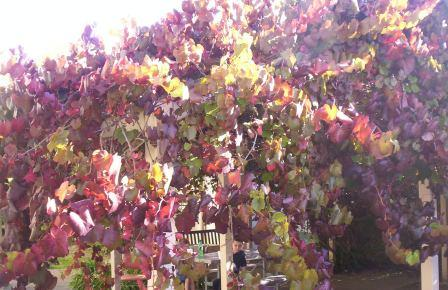
The ornamental grape autumn colors. Growing in Victoria, Australia.

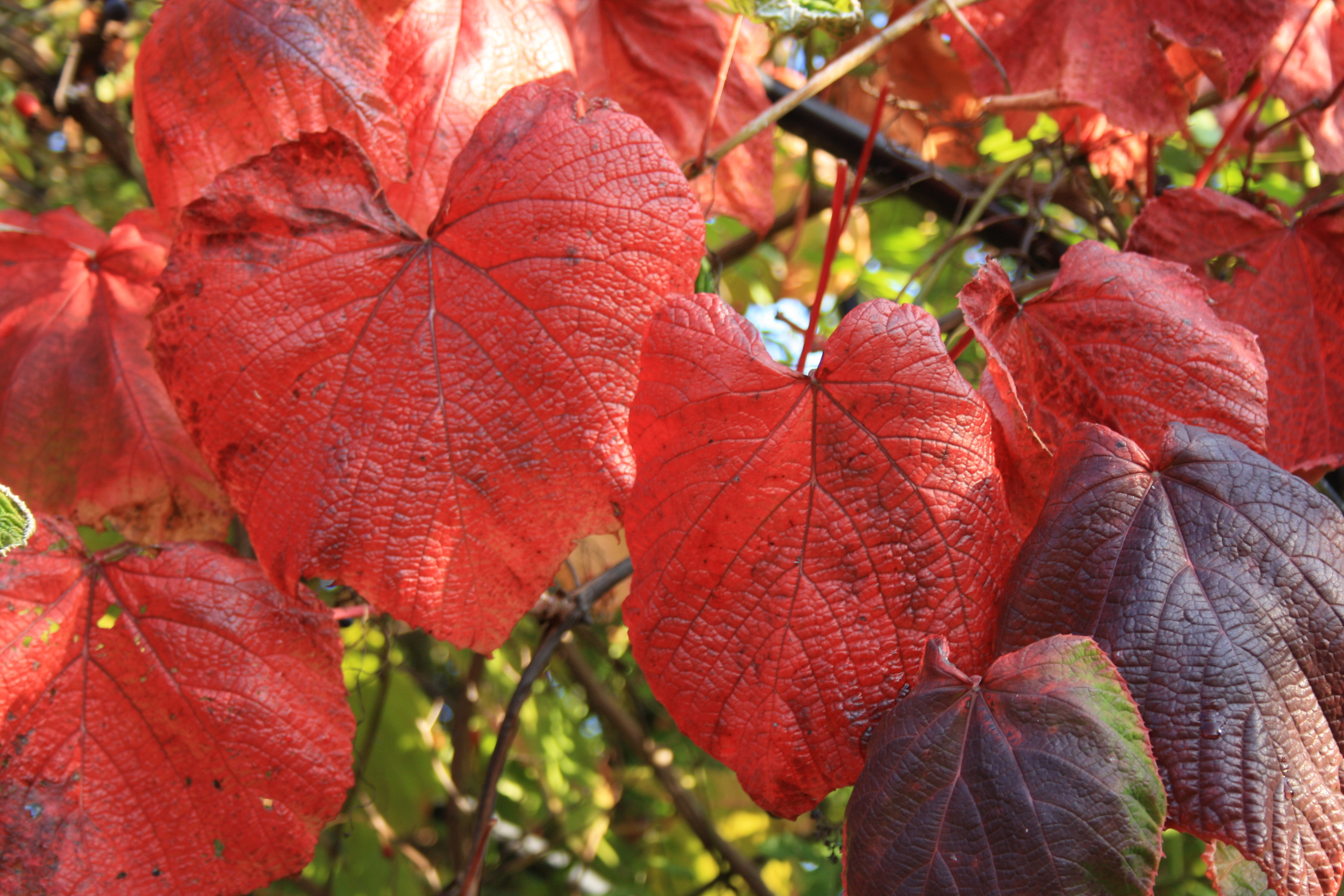
Vitis coignetiae in Northern France.

== See also ==
- Vitis 'Ornamental Grape', a nonfruiting ornamental grapevine cultivar, also known as 'crimson glory, grown for its autumn foliage

== See also ==
- List of plants with edible leaves
