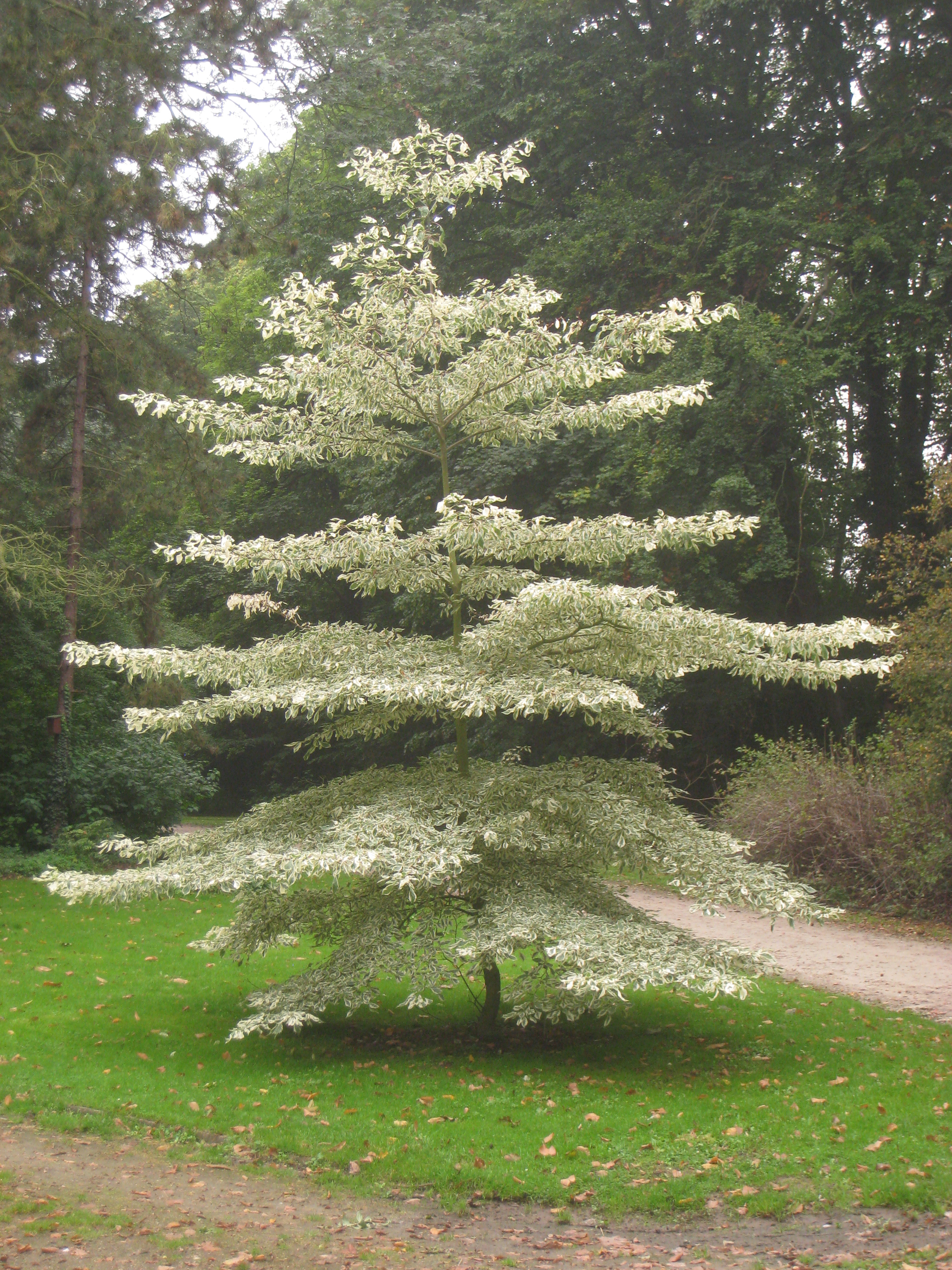
- C. controversa 'Variegata' in the National Botanic Garden of Belgium

Conservation status
- Least Concern (IUCN 3.1)

Scientific classification
- Kingdom: Plantae
- Clade: Tracheophytes
- Clade: Angiosperms
- Clade: Eudicots
- Clade: Asterids
- Order: Cornales
- Family: Cornaceae
- Genus: Cornus
- Subgenus: Cornus subg. Mesomora
- Species: C. controversa

Binomial name
- Cornus controversa Hemsl.

Synonyms
- Bothrocaryum controversum (Hemsl.) Pojark.; Swida controversa (Hemsl.) Soják; Cornus brachypoda var. variegata G.Paul; Cornus controversa var. alpina Wangerin; Cornus controversa var. angustifolia Wangerin; Cornus controversa var. shikokumontana Hiyama; Cornus controversa var. variegata (G.Paul) Bean; Cornus controversa f. variegata (G.Paul) Rehder; Cornus macrophylla f. variegata (G.Paul) Schelle; Cornus macrophylla var. variegata (G.Paul) G.Nicholson; Cornus obovata Thunb.; Swida controversa var. alpina (Wangerin) H.Hara ex Noshiro; Swida controversa var. shikokumontana (Hiyama) H.Hara ex Noshiro

= Cornus controversa =

Species of tree

Cornus controversa (wedding cake tree), syn. Swida controversa, is a species of flowering plant in the dogwood family Cornaceae. It is native to China, Korea, the Himalayas and Japan. It is a deciduous tree growing to 50 ft (15 m), with multiple tiered branches. Flat panicles of white flowers (cymes to 3–7 in (8–18 cm) wide) appear in summer, followed by globose black fruit (drupes to 1/2 in (13 mm)). Ovate dark green leaves (3–6 in (8–15 cm) long) are glaucous underneath and turn red-purple in autumn. It is cultivated in gardens and parks in temperate regions.

It is also sometimes referred to as Bothrocaryum controversum (Hemsl.) Pojark when seeds are offered for online sale.

The variety C. controversa 'Variegata' has leaves with cream margins, which turn yellow in autumn, and grows to a lesser size than its parent – typically 25 ft (8 m). It has gained the Royal Horticultural Society's Award of Garden Merit.

== Gallery ==
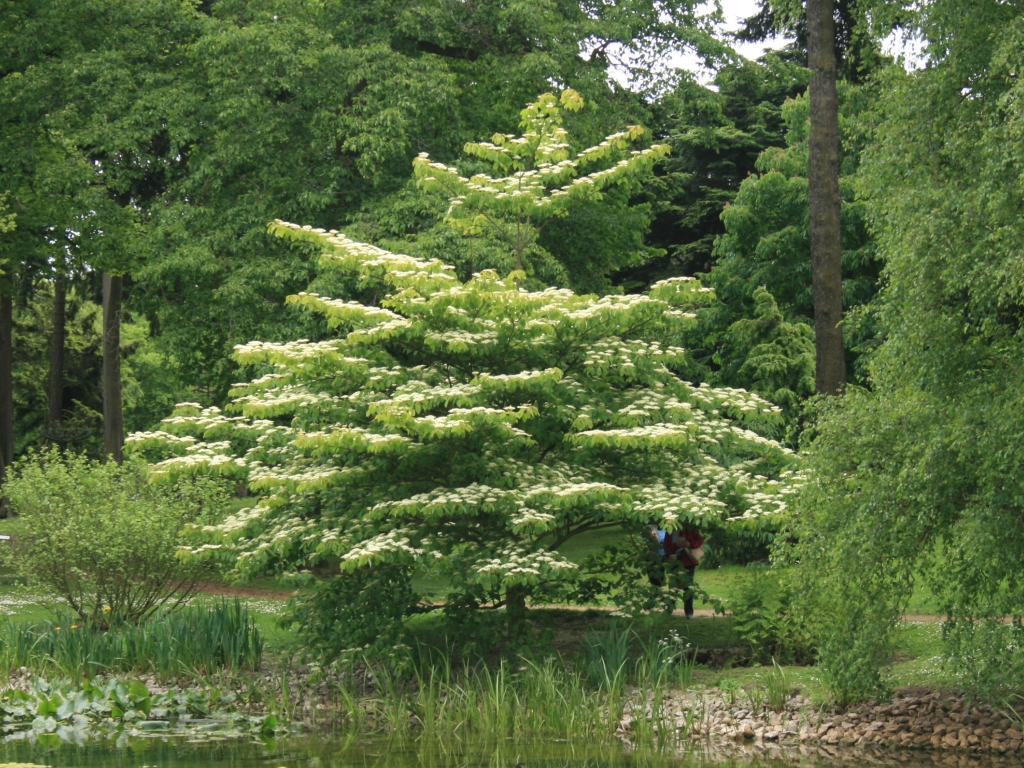
Cornus controversa, Kew Gardens, London

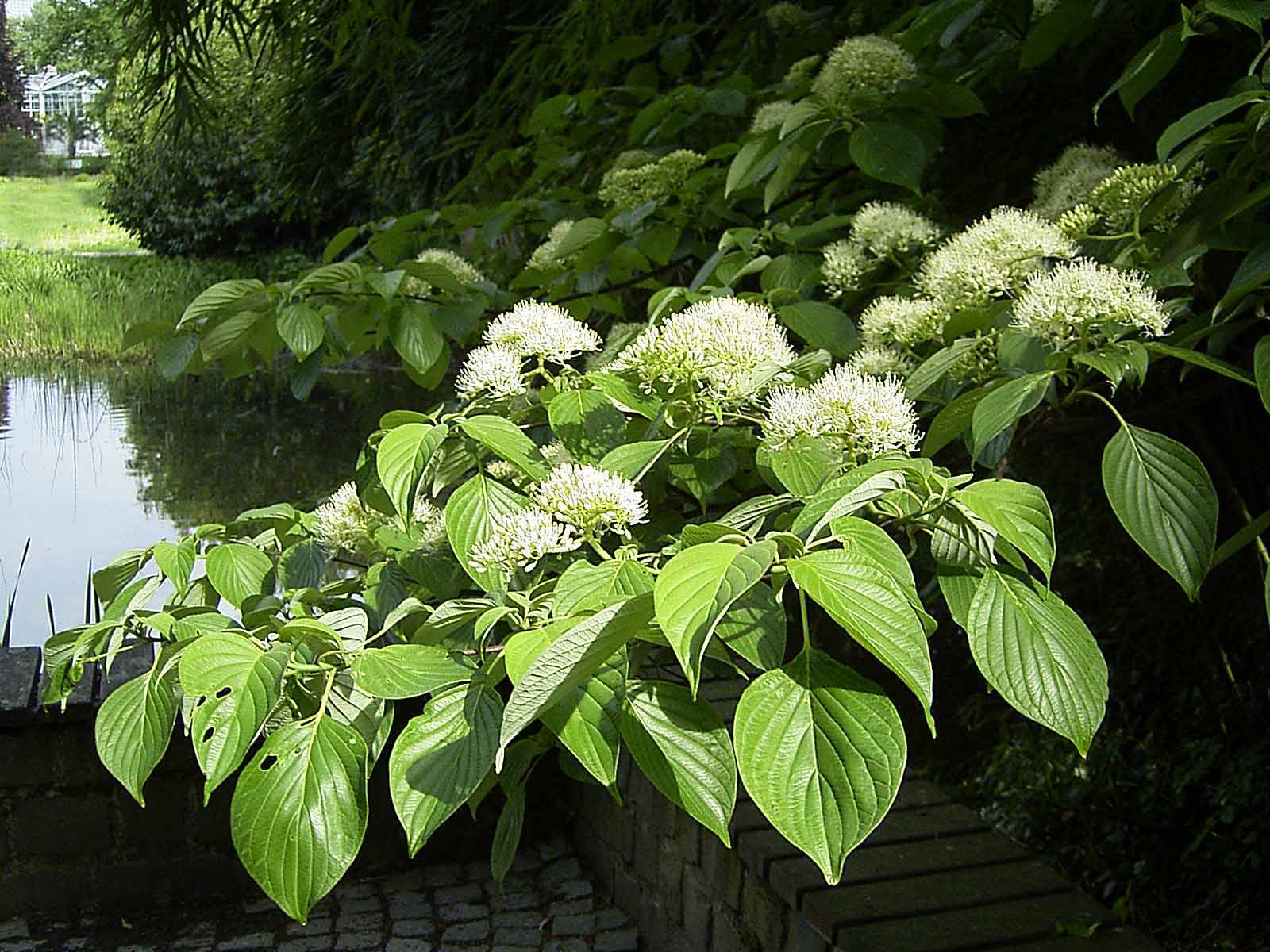
Cornus controversa in May, Frankfurt

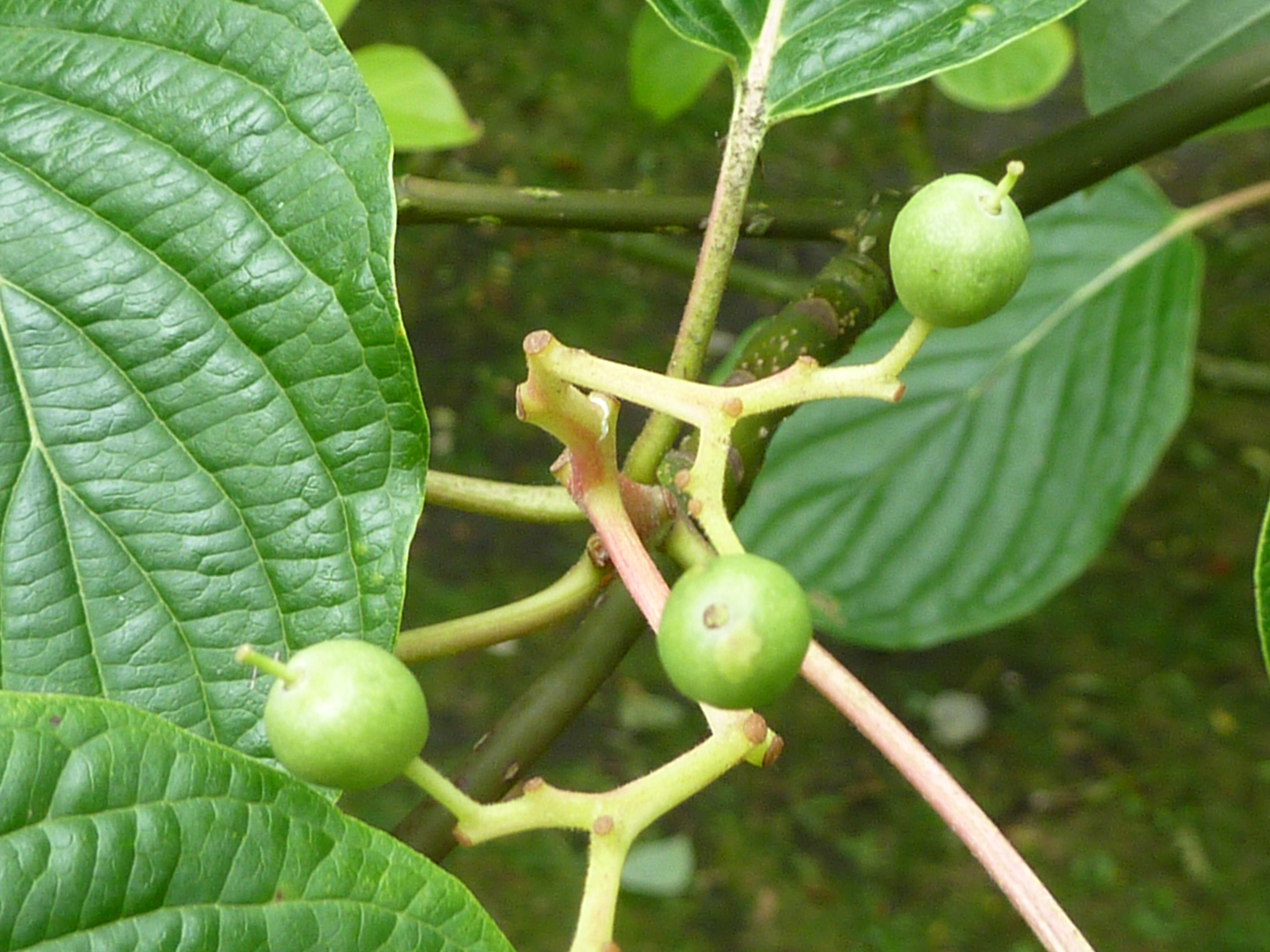
Fruit (drupes), Cambridge University Botanic Garden

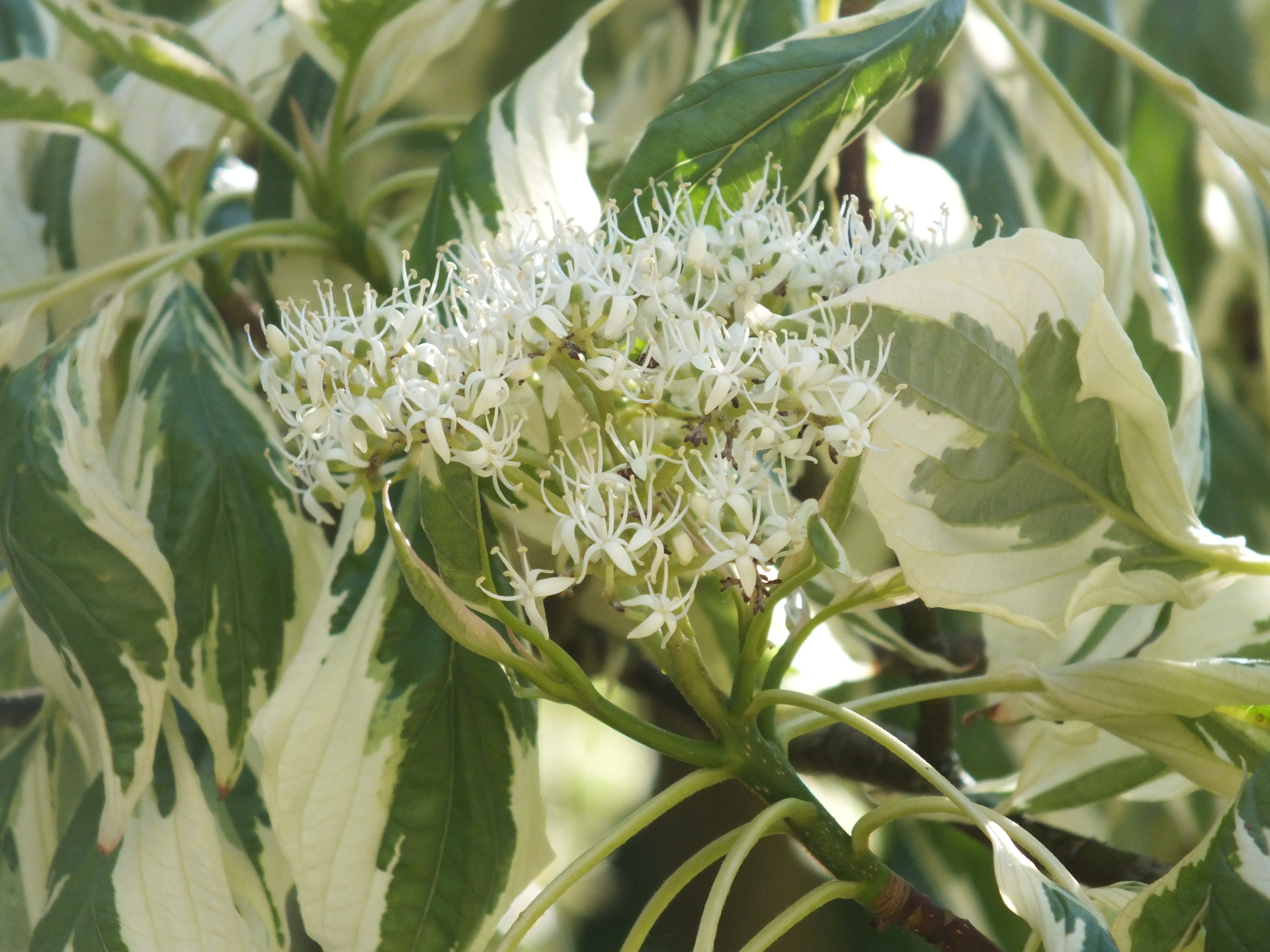
C. controversa 'Variegata', Moorbad Park, Germany
