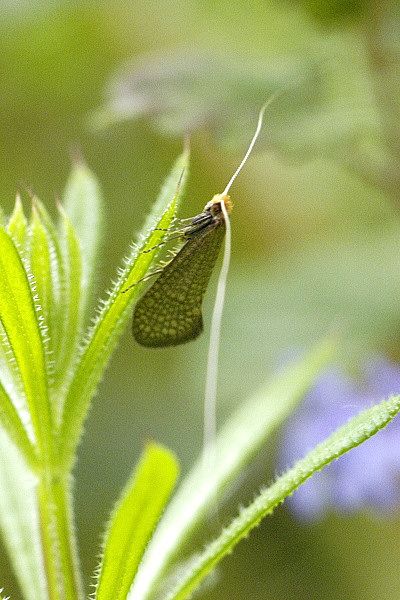

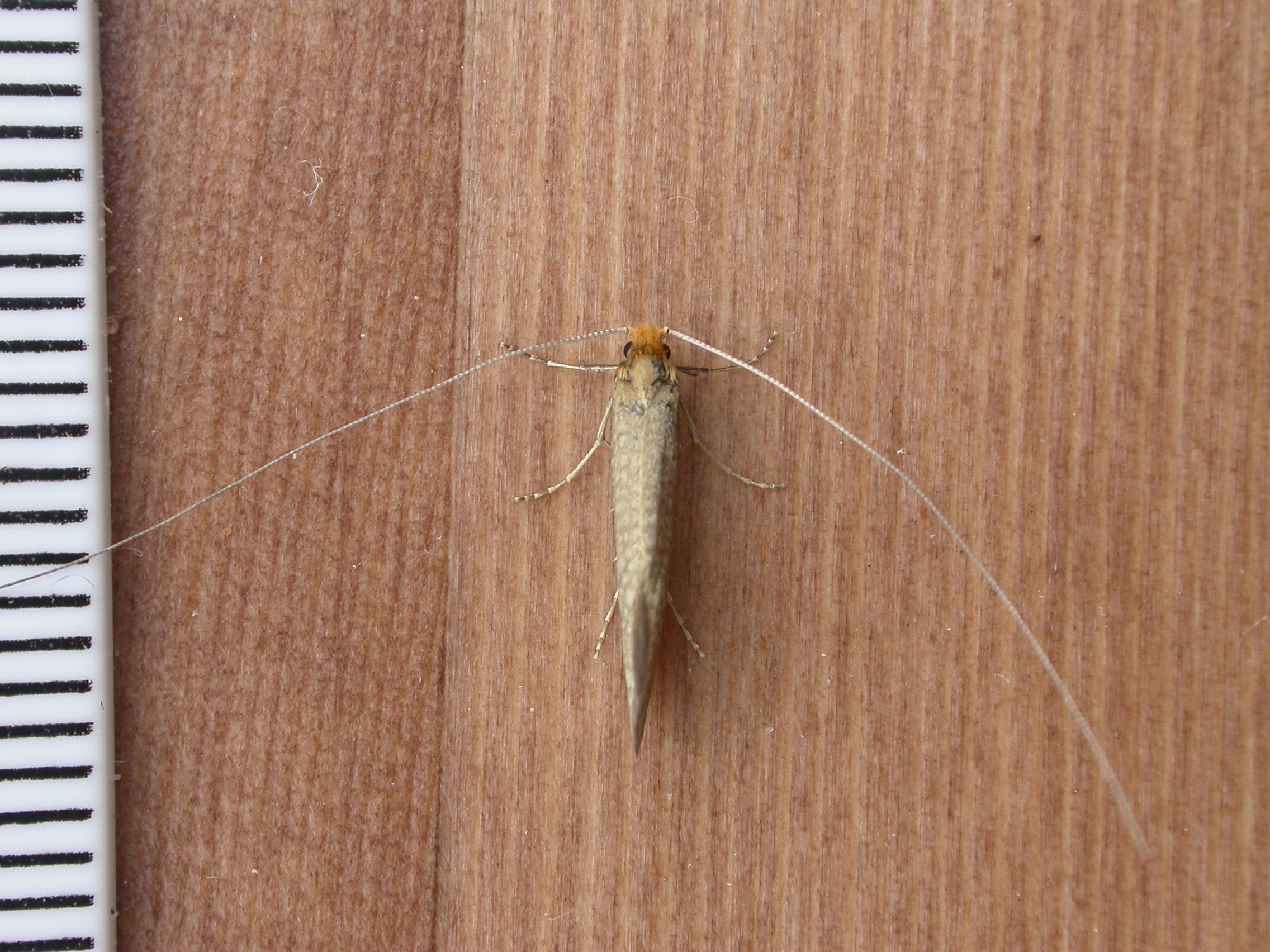

Scientific classification
- Kingdom: Animalia
- Phylum: Arthropoda
- Clade: Pancrustacea
- Class: Insecta
- Order: Lepidoptera
- Family: Adelidae
- Genus: Nematopogon
- Species: N. adansoniella

Binomial name
- Nematopogon adansoniella (Villers, 1789)

Synonyms
- Nemophora annulatella Ragonot, 1876; Nemophora pseudopilella Peyerimhoff, 1877; Nematopogon panzerella (Fabricius, 1794); Phalaena adansoniella Villers, 1789; Tinea panzerella Fabricius, 1794; Nemophora prolai Hartig, 1941 Nematopogon prolai

= Nematopogon adansoniella =

Species of moth

Nematopogon adansoniella is a lepidopteran, a moth of the family Adelidae. It is found in Europe.

Its wingspan is 15–20 mm. The moth flies from late April to June depending on the location.

The larvae feed on Fagus sylvatica, oak, Prunus spinosa and bilberry.

The synonym Tinea panzerella has also been applied to Pseudatemelia subochreella in error. To certainly determine the species of the genus Nematopogon dissection and study of the genitalia is necessary.

== Description ==
=== Adult ===
This is a small, rather primitive moth, with wing venation that is heteroneurous and a female reproductive system with a single opening used both for mating and for oviposition.
A tergosternal connection can be observed, posterior to the first abdominal spiracle, formed by a ventrocaudal process of the first tergite that connects to the anterolateral extension of the second sternite.

The forewing is lanceolate with a rounded apex; it is dull brownish-grey with greenish iridescence and strongly marked veins; the termen tends to be slightly darker. Microtrichia are present and uniformly distributed.

Its hindwing is stouter and more rounded, a uniform off-white with silvery reflections; as in all Adelidae, there is a reduction of the system associated with the radial sector (Rs) of the hindwing, with anastomosis of Sc and R from the fourth basal to the termen, and an unbranched Rs; wing coupling is frenate, with a single composite bristle frenulum in the male and multiple bristles in the female. A coupling apparatus between the forewing and metathorax is present; a precoxal bridge and loss of the first abdominal sternite can also be observed, while the second is divided into a smaller anterior sclerite (S2a) and a larger posterior one (S2b).

Its head is yellowish. The antennae are filiform and, especially in the male, exceed the body length by a considerable margin. An intercalary sclerite is present, as well as lateral spinules (probably derived from sensilla) on some proximal segments of the male flagellum. The basal antennomeres appear alternately white and black, then become more or less uniformly white in the distal portion of the antenna.

Ocelli are absent, as are chaetosemata. The male's eyes are fairly developed. The proboscis is fully functional, covered in scales, and longer than the head capsule, extending beyond the maxillary palps; the latter are elongated. The labial palps have three segments, short, with lateral setae on the second; the apical segment shows a vom Rath organ.

On the legs, the tibial spur formula is 0-2-4.

The male genitalia show, on each valva, a comb-like structure called a pectinifer. The uncus is absent, while the vinculum has an elongated saccus. The juxta is arrow-shaped and the aedeagus is slender.

In the female genitalia, the ovipositor is well developed and piercing, with laterally flattened apices that allow eggs to be inserted into the leaf tissues of the host plant; this feature is considered a secondary specialization of the Adelidae. The cloaca is narrow and tube-like. The apophysis is strongly sclerotized; the corpus bursae is developed and membranous, without signa.

Its wingspan is 15–20 mm.

=== Egg ===
The eggs are slightly speckled; they are inserted singly into the tissues of the host plant, and thus take on the shape of the "pocket" into which the female inserts them.

=== Larva ===
The caterpillar, almost cylindrical, has a rounded head that is not flattened and is prognathous, with a pronounced epicranial groove and six stemmata per side.

Two genal setae, G1 and G2, are present, while the absence of seta AF2 is considered a secondary evolution.
A well-sclerotized shield is visible on the prothorax.
The thoracic legs are well developed, while the prolegs, on abdominal segments III–VI and X, are strongly reduced; the proleg crochets, absent on segment X, are arranged in multiple rows.

=== Pupa ===
The pupa is decticous, with a slightly sclerotized cuticle and appendages only weakly adherent to the body. The maxillary palps appear prominent, while the labial palps are exposed, as are the coxae of the first pair of legs. Inside the cocoon, the antennae are arranged around the abdomen. Abdominal segments III–VII are mobile, and one or two rows of spinules can be seen on the surface of most segments.

== Biology ==
=== Behaviour ===
Adults fly in direct sunlight, and swarms may be observed, especially around groups of inflorescences, trees, or shrubs.

The larva is a leaf miner in spring; later, as it approaches the pre-pupal stage, the caterpillar lives inside a portable, lenticular case that it builds from leaf fragments and woodland litter, enlarging it as it grows; in this phase it feeds mainly on fallen leaves in the leaf litter, or in general on low-growing plants.

Pupation therefore occurs inside this casing, often at the foot of the host plant, under the layer of fallen leaves.

=== Flight period ===
Adults emerge between early April and June, depending on latitude.

=== Feeding ===
The larvae of this species feed on leaves of plants belonging to several families, including:

- Fagus sylvatica L. (European beech, Fagaceae)
- Prunus spinosa L. (blackthorn, Rosaceae)
- Quercus robur L. (pedunculate oak, Fagaceae)
- Vaccinium myrtillus L. (bilberry, Ericaceae)
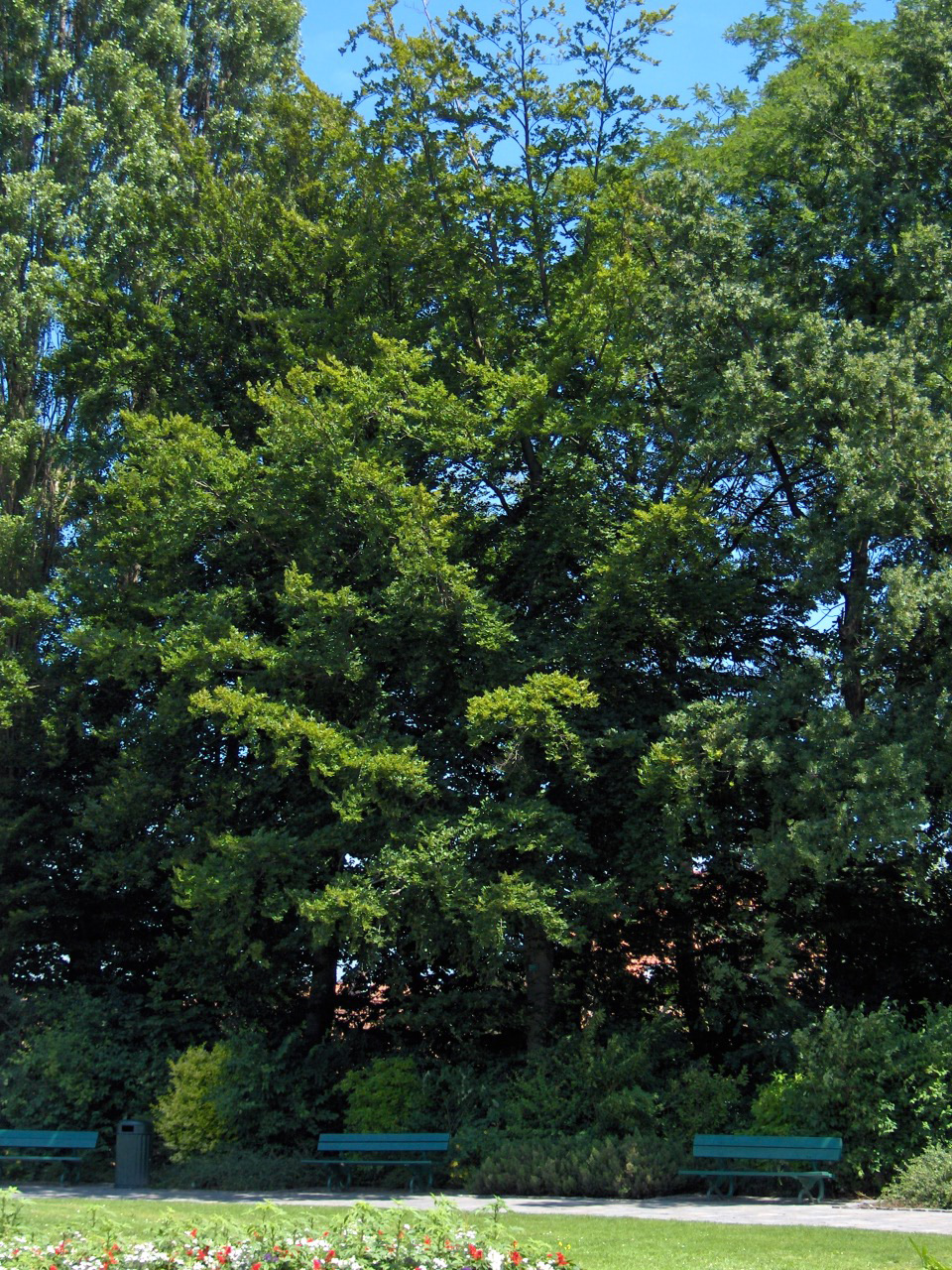
Fagus sylvatica

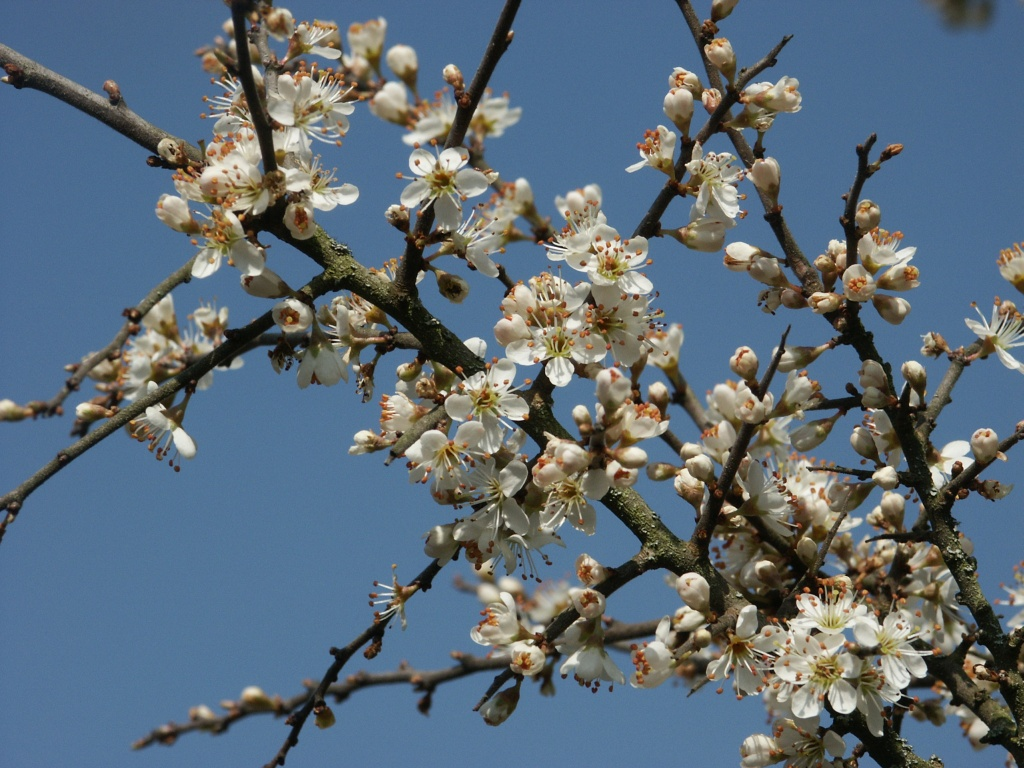
Prunus spinosa

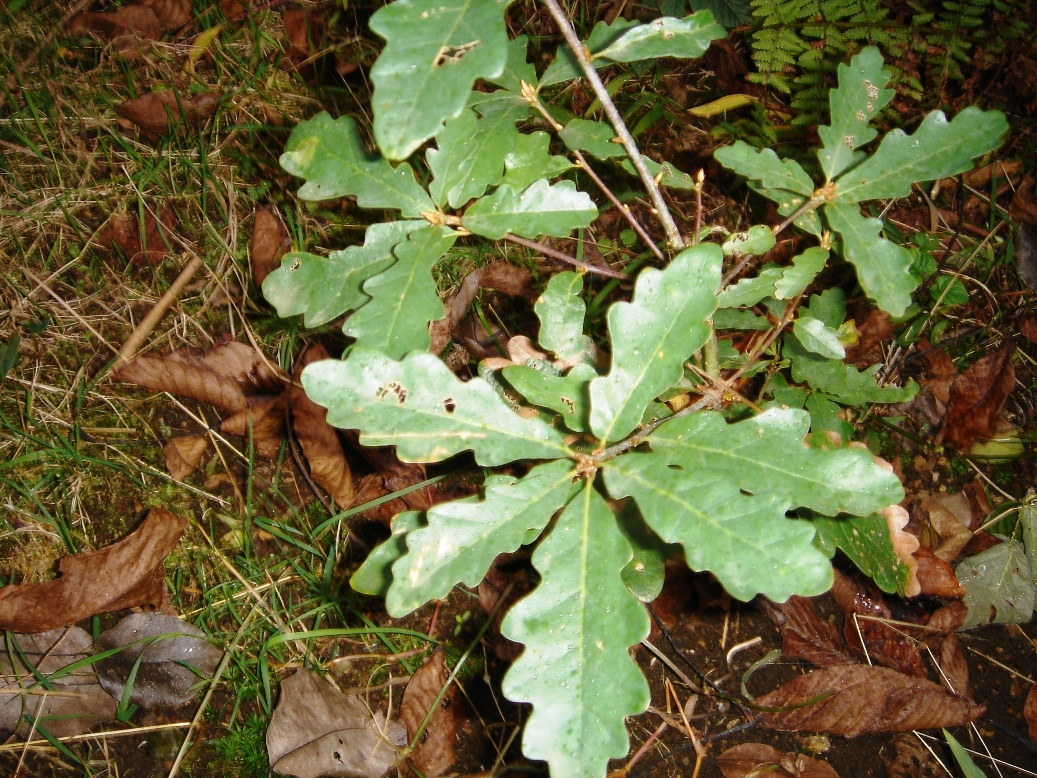
Quercus robur

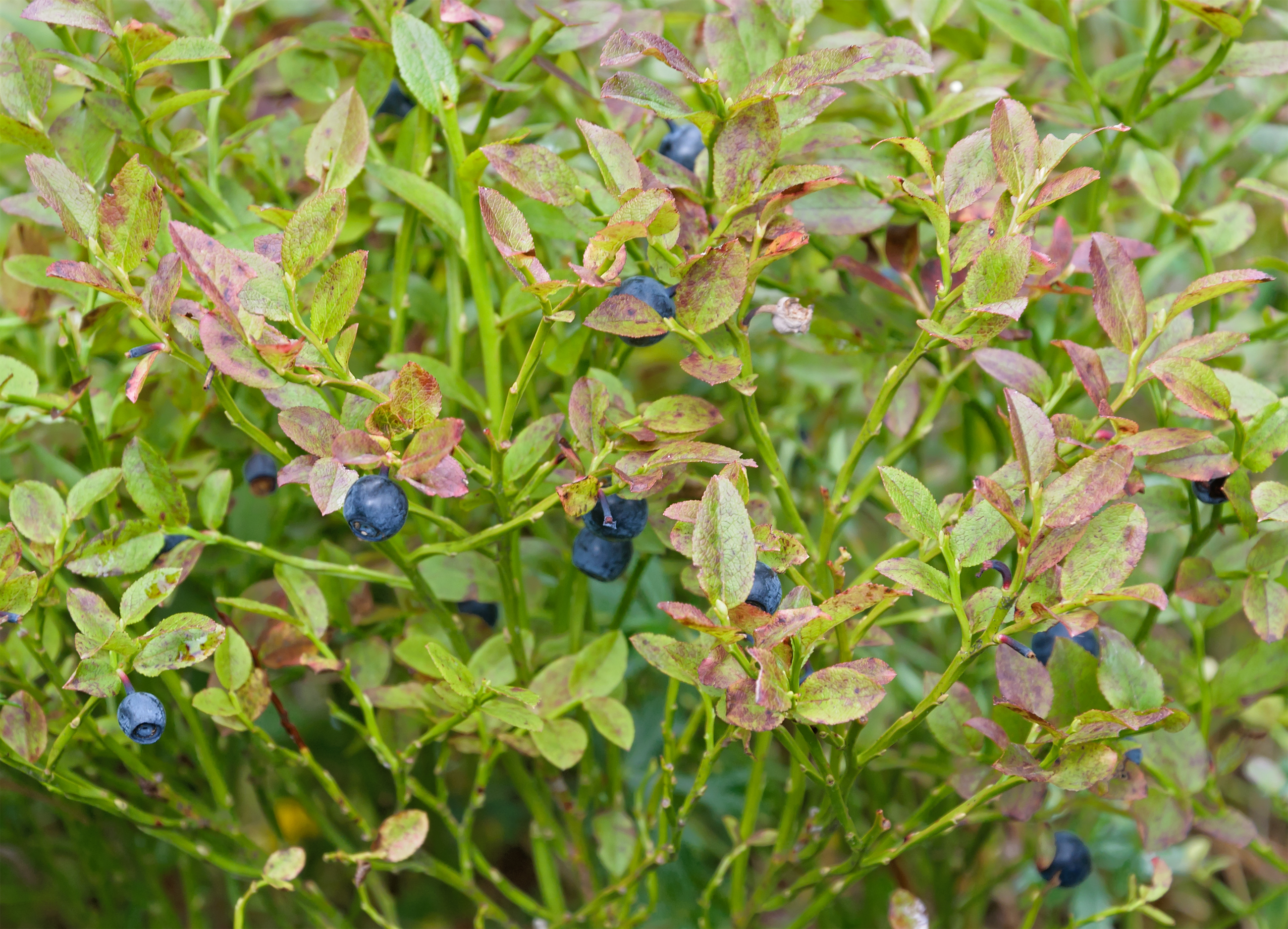
Vaccinium myrtillus

== Distribution and habitat ==
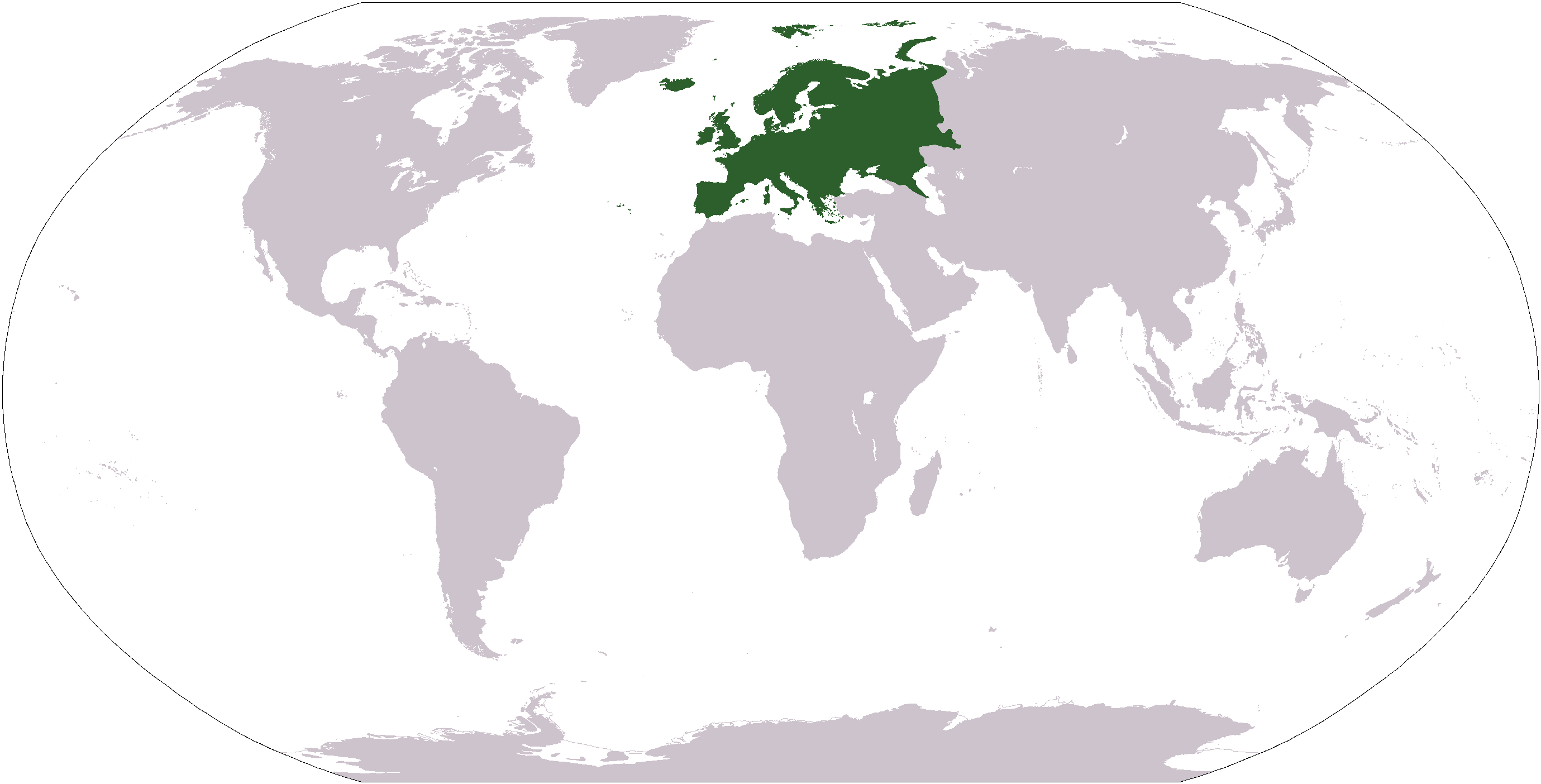
The species is distributed in Europe

The species is distributed in Europe (locus typicus), and more specifically has been found in: Spain (excluding the Canaries and the Balearics), France (excluding Corsica), Belgium, the Netherlands, Luxembourg, Sweden, Denmark (absent from the Faroe Islands), Germany, Switzerland, Austria, Hungary, Italy (present from north to south, but absent from Sardinia and Sicily), Croatia, Bosnia and Herzegovina, Serbia and Montenegro, Albania, Poland, Lithuania, the Czech Republic, Slovakia, Romania, and Turkey. There are also no reliable data regarding its presence in Macedonia, Belarus, Moldova, and Russia.

The habitat consists of deciduous forests, scrub, and woodland areas.

== Taxonomy ==
=== Subspecies ===
No subspecies have been described.

=== Synonyms ===
Nine synonyms have been reported.

- Alucita panzerella (Fabricius, 1794) - Ent. Syst. 3(2): 339 - Type locality: Italy (heterotypic synonym).
- Capillaria panzeri (Haworth, 1828) - Lepid. Br. 522 - Type locality: United Kingdom, Kent and York (heterotypic synonym).
- Nematopogon panzerella (Fabricius, 1794) - Ent. Syst. 3(2): 339 - Type locality: Italy (heterotypic synonym).
- Nemophora annulatella (Ragonot, 1876) - Ann. Soc. Ent. Fr. 6: LXVI - Type locality: France, vicinity of Paris (heterotypic synonym).
- Nemophora panzerella (Hubner, 1819) - Verz. bekann. Schmett. 7 (heterotypic synonym).
- Nemophora pseudopilella (Peyerimhoff, 1877) - Pet. Nouv. Ent. 2: 102 - Type locality: France, Hyeres and Cannes (heterotypic synonym).
- Nemophora sabulosella (Walker, 1863) - Cat. Lep. Het. Br. Mus. 28: 497 - Type locality: Australia (sic) (heterotypic synonym).
- Phalaena adansoniella (Villers, 1789) - Car. Linn. entom. 2: 527 - Type locality: Europe (homotypic synonym; basionym).
- Tinea panzerella (Fabricius, 1794) - Ent. Syst. 3(2): 339 - Type locality: Italy (heterotypic synonym).

=== Gallery ===
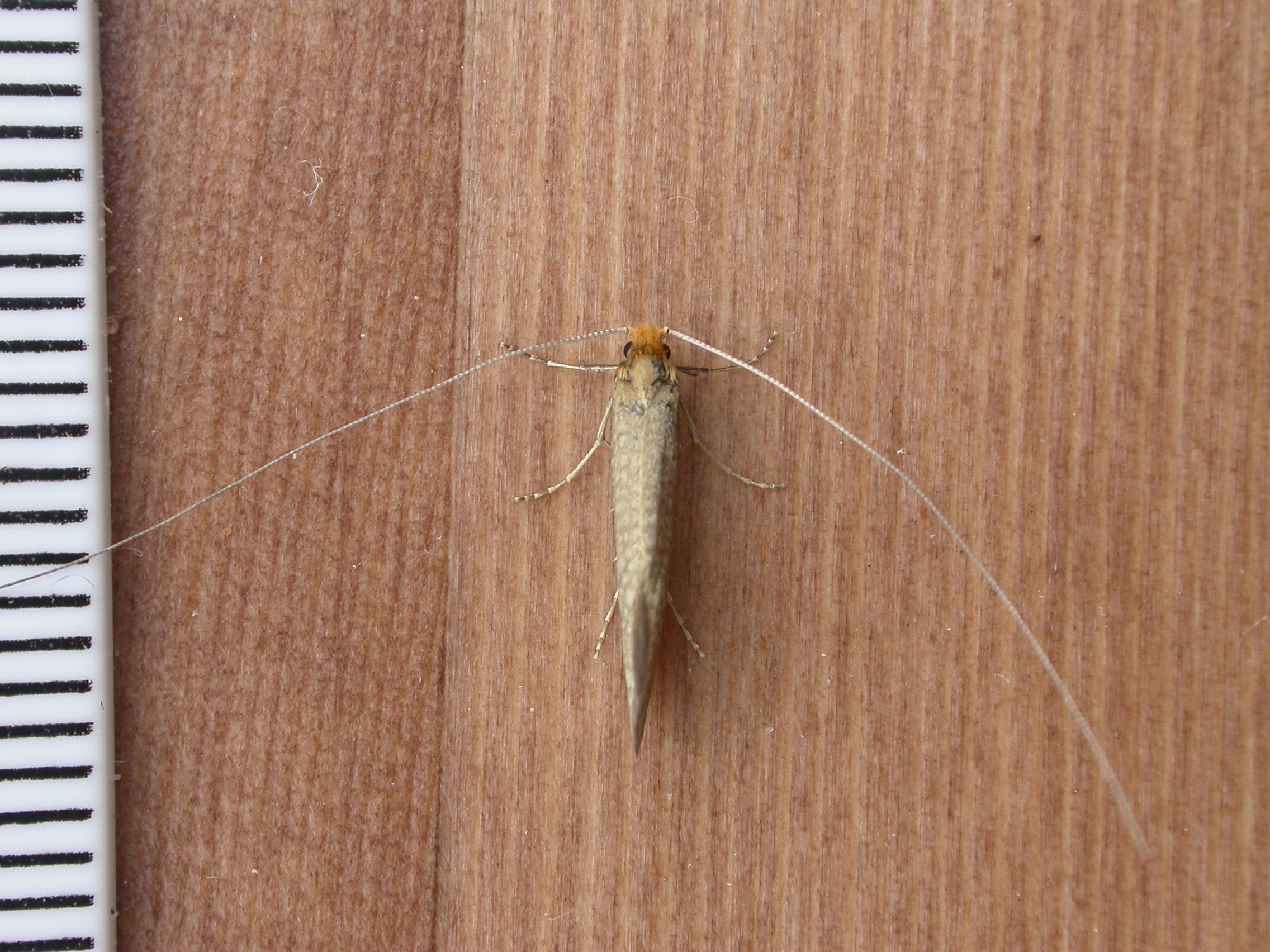

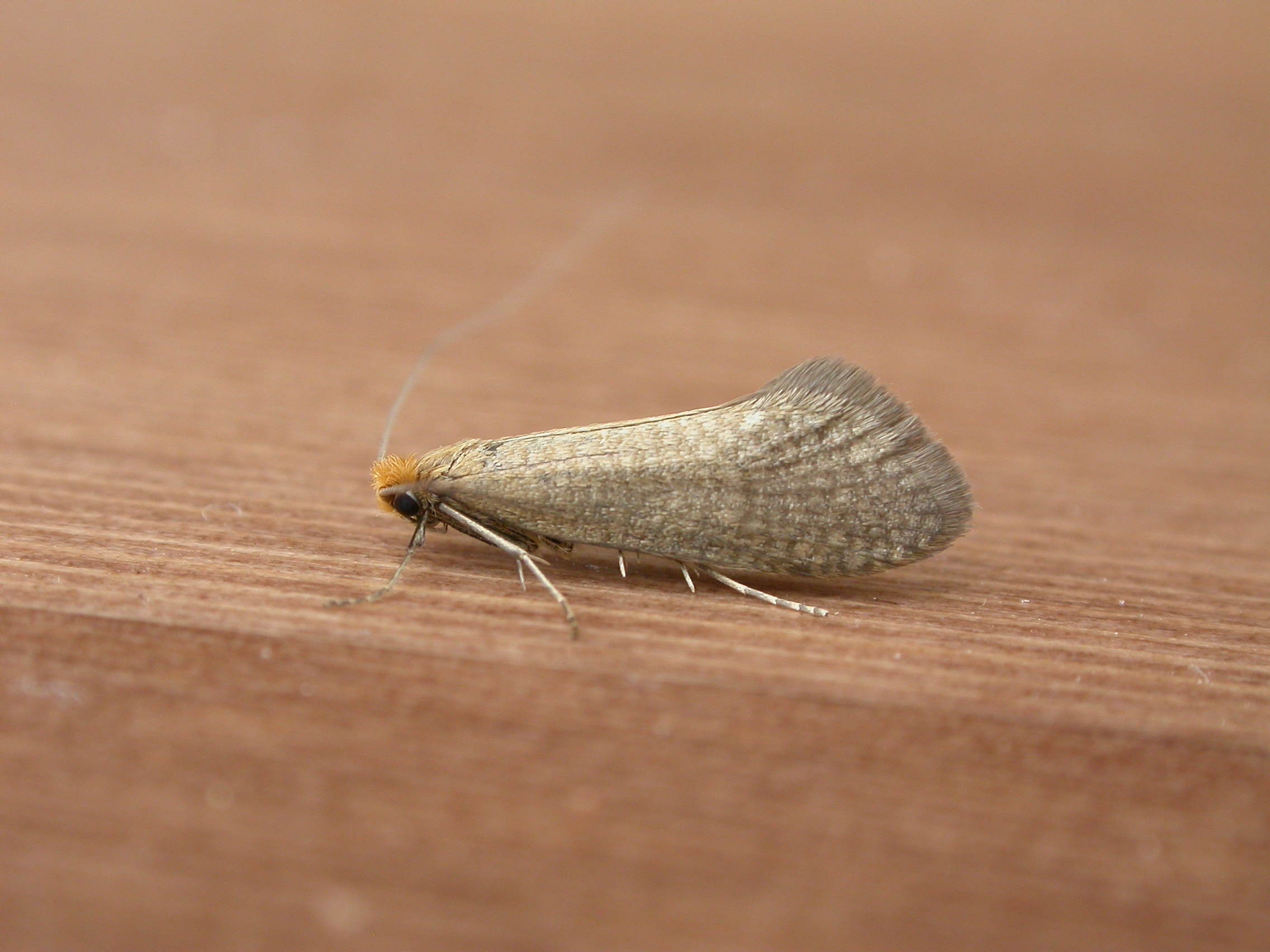

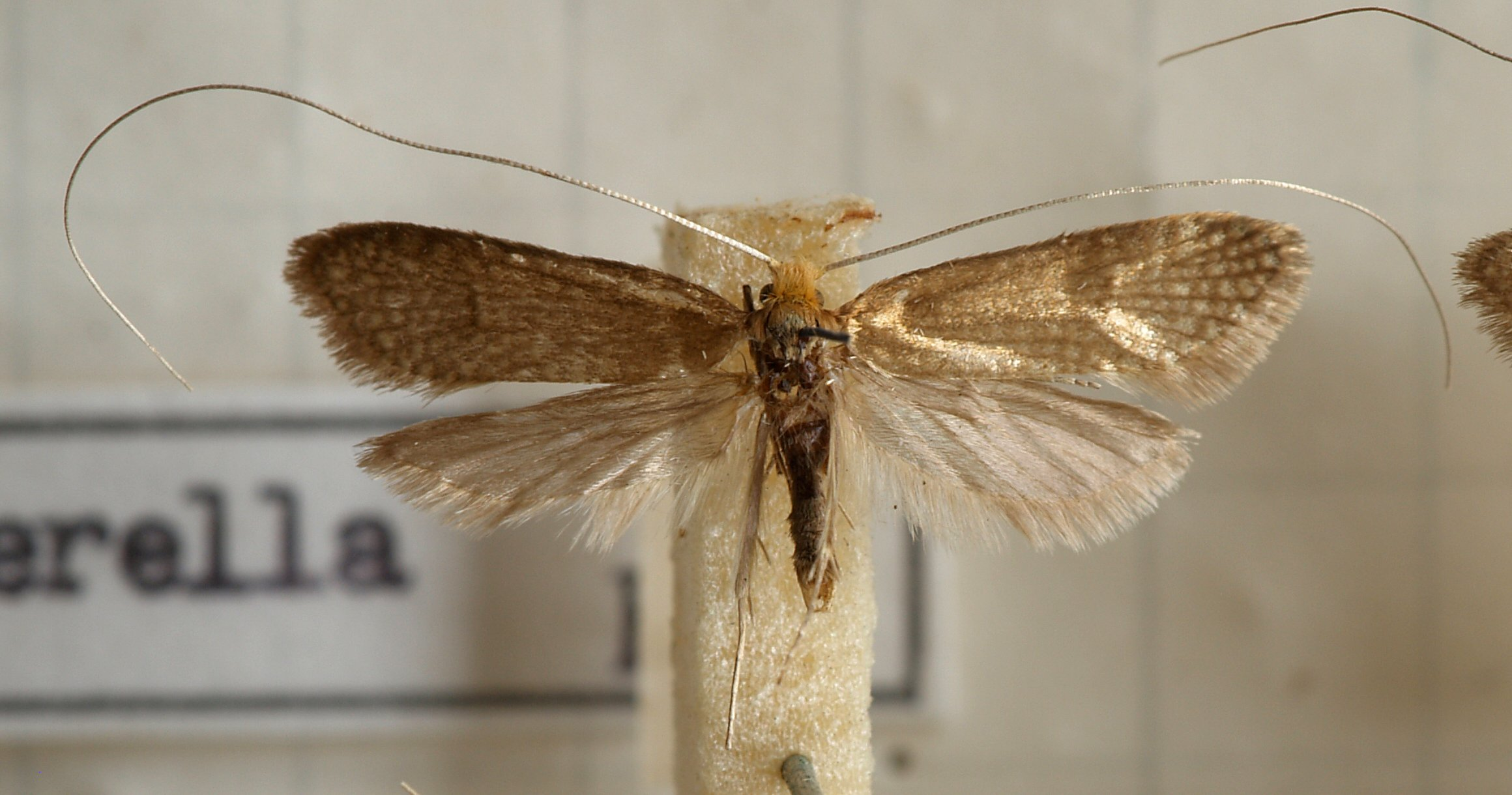

== See also ==
- Adela reaumurella
- Leaf miner
- Nematopogon schwarziellus

== Bibliography ==
- Agassiz, J. L. R. (1847) [1842-1847] - Nomenclatoris Zoologici, continens nomina systematica generum Animalium tam viventium quam fossilium, secundum ordinem alphabeticum disposita, adjectis auctoribus, libris in quibus reperiuntor, anno editionis, etymologia, et familis, ad quas pertinent, in variis classibus (Lepidoptera). Soloduri: Jent et Gassmann. Fasc. 9-10 [1846]; (Index universalis). 12 [1847] viii+393.
- Barnes, W.; McDunnough, J. (1917). Check List of the Lepidoptera of Boreal America. Decatur, Illinois: Herald Press. p. 410. doi:10.5962/bhl.title.10097. OCLC 3715995.
- Birket-Smith, J.; Kristensen, N. P. (1974). "The Skeleto-Muscular Anatomy of the Genital Segments of Male Eriocrania (Insecta: Lepidoptera)". Zeitschrift für Morphologie und Ökologie der Tiere. 77 (2): 157–174. doi:10.1007/BF00374214.
- Bourgogne, J. (1951). "Ordre des Lépidoptères" [Order Lepidoptera]. In Grasse, P. (ed.). Traité de Zoologie: anatomie, systématique, biologie [Treatise of Zoology: anatomy, systematics, biology]. Mémoires de l'Institut océanographique (in French). Vol. 10. Paris: Masson. pp. 175–448.
- Braun, A. F. (1933). "Pupal tracheation and imaginal venation in Microlepidoptera". Transactions of the American Entomological Society. 59: 229–268. ISSN 2328-3815.
- Brock, J. P. (1971). "A contribution towards an understanding of the morphology and phylogeny of the Ditrysian Lepidoptera". Journal of Natural History. 5 (1): 29–102. Bibcode:1971JNatH...5...29B. doi:10.1080/00222937100770031. ISSN 0022-2933.
- Brown, J. M., O. Pellmyr, J. N. Thompson, and R. G. Harrison (1994) - Mitochondrial DNA phylogeny of the Prodoxidae (Lepidoptera: Incurvarioidea) indicates a rapid ecological diversification of the yucca moths. Annals of the Entomological Society of America 87: 795-802.
- Busck, A. (16 June 1914). "On the classification of the Microlepidoptera". Proceedings of the Entomological Society of Washington. 16 (2): 46–54. ISSN 0013-8797.
- Capinera, J. L., ed. (2008). Encyclopedia of Entomology. Vol. 4 vols. (2nd ed.). Dordrecht: Springer Science+Business Media B.V. p. 4346. ISBN 978-1-4020-6242-1. LCCN 2008930112. OCLC 837039413.
- Chapman, T. A. (1916). "Micropteryx Entitled to Ordinal Rank; Order Zeugloptera". Transactions of the Royal Entomological Society of London. 1916: 310–314. ISSN 2053-2520.
- Chinery, M. (1987). "Ordine Lepidoptera - Farfalle diurne e notturne" [Order Lepidoptera - Diurnal and nocturnal butterflies]. Guida degli insetti d'Europa - Atlante illustrato a colori [Guide to the insects of Europe - Illustrated colour atlas]. Scienze Naturali. Translated by Manicastri, C.; Marangoni, C. (1st ed.). Padua: Franco Muzzio Editore. p. 375. ISBN 8870213781.
- Clarke, J. F. G. (1942). "Notes and New Species of Microlepidoptera from Washington State". Proceedings of the United States National Museum. 92 (3149): 267–276. doi:10.5479/si.00963801.92-3149.267. ISSN 0096-3801.
- Common, I. F. B. (March 1973). "A New Family of Dacnonypha (Lepidoptera) Based on Three New Species from Southern Australia, with Notes on the Agathiphagidae". Journal of the Australian Entomological Society. 12 (1): 11–23. doi:10.1111/j.1440-6055.1973.tb02150.x. ISSN 0004-9050.
- Common, I. F. B. (January 1975). "Evolution and Classification of the Lepidoptera". Annual Review of Entomology. 20: 183–203. doi:10.1146/annurev.en.20.010175.001151. ISSN 0066-4170.
- Common, I. F. B. (1990). Moths of Australia. Slater, E. (photographs). Carlton, Victoria: Melbourne University Press. p. 535. ISBN 978-0-522-84326-2. LCCN 89048654. OCLC 220444217.
- Crampton, G. C. (April–June 1920). "A Comparison of the External Anatomy of the Lower Lepidoptera and Trichoptera from the Standpoint of Phylogeny" (PDF). Psyche: A Journal of Entomology. 27 (2–3): 23–24. doi:10.1155/1920/10397. ISSN 0033-2615.
- Davis, D. R. (1975). "Systematics and zoogeography of the family Neopseustidae with the proposal of a new superfamily (Lepidoptera, Neopseustoidea)" (PDF). Smithsonian Contributions to Zoology. 210 (210): 1–44. doi:10.5479/si.00810282.210. ISSN 0081-0282.
- Davis, D. R. (1978). "A revision of the North American moths of the superfamily Eriocranioidea with the proposal of a new family, Acanthopteroctetidae (Lepidoptera)" (PDF). Smithsonian Contributions to Zoology. 251 (251): 131. doi:10.5479/si.00810282.251. ISSN 0081-0282.
- Davis, D. R. (1986). "A New Family of Monotrysian Moths from Austral South America (Lepidoptera: Palaephatidae), with a Phylogenetic Review of the Monotrysia" (PDF). Smithsonian Contributions to Zoology. 434 (434): 202. Bibcode:1986SCZoo.434....1D. doi:10.5479/si.00810282.434. ISSN 0081-0282.
- Davis, D. R. (1989). "Generic revision of the Opostegidae, with a synoptic catalog of the world's species (Lepidoptera:Nepticuloidea)" (PDF). Smithsonian Contributions to Zoology. 478 (478): 1–97. doi:10.5479/si.00810282.478. ISSN 0081-0282.
- Davis, D. R. (January 1990). "Neotropical Microlepidoptera XXIII. First report of the family Eriocottidae from the New World, with descriptions of new taxa". Proceedings of the Entomological Society of Washington. 92: 1–35. ISSN 0013-8797.
- Davis, D. R.; Gentili-Poole, P. (24 March 2003). "Andesianidae, a new family of monotrysian moths (Lepidoptera:Andesianoidea) from austral South America" (PDF). Invertebrate Systematics. 17 (1): 15–26. doi:10.1071/IS02006. ISSN 1445-5226.
- Davis, D. R.; Nielsen, E. S. (1980). "Description of a new genus and two new species of Neopseustidae from South America, with discussion of phylogeny and biological observations" (PDF). Steenstrupia. 6 (16): 253–289. ISSN 0375-2909.
- Dugdale, J. S. (1974). "Female Genital Configuration in the Classification of Lepidoptera". New Zealand Journal of Zoology. 1 (2): 127–146. doi:10.1080/03014223.1974.9517821. ISSN 1175-8821.
- Dyar, H. G. (1902[1903]) - A List of North American Lepidoptera. Bulletin of the United States National Museum, 52: 723 pp.
- Fletcher, T. B. (1929). A list of the generic names used for Microlepidoptera. Memoirs of the Department of Agriculture in India. Entomological series. Vol. 11. Calcutta: Government of India Central Publication Branch. p. 246. OCLC 4545236.
- Fracker, S. B. (1915). The Classification of Lepidopterous Larvae. Illinois Biological Monographs. Vol. 2. Urbana: University of Illinois. p. 169. doi:10.5962/bhl.title.10246. LCCN 16004244.
- Friese, G. (1969) - Zur Phylogenie der alteren Teilgruppen der Lepidopteren. Bericht uber die 10 Wonderversammlung Deutscher Entomologen Tagungsberichte 80 2: 203-222.
- Gentili, P. (1989) - Revision sistematica de los Cossidae (Lep.) de la Patagonia Andina. Revista de la Sociedad Entomologica Argentina 45: 3-76.
- Gerasimov, A. M.; Pavlovskij, E. N.; Skarlato, O. A. (1952). "Caterpillars, Part 1". Fauna SSSR - Insects-Lepidoptera [Fauna of the USSR - Insects-Lepidoptera]. Novaja serija 56 Nasekomye cesuekrylye (in Russian). Vol. 1. Moscow: Akademija Nauk SSSR; Zoologiceskij Institut. p. 338. LCCN 82203078.
- Grimaldi, D. A.; Engel, M. S. (May 2005). Evolution of the Insects. Cambridge, UK; New York: Cambridge University Press. p. 755. ISBN 978-0-521-82149-0. LCCN 2004054605.
- Hennig, W. (1953). "Kritische Bemerkungen zum phylogenetischen System der Insekten" [Critical remarks on the phylogenetic system of insects]. Beitrage zur Entomologie (in German). 3 (Sonderheft): 1–85. ISSN 0005-805X.
- Heppner, J. B., ed. (1989). "Primitive Microlepidoptera (Micropterigoidea - Incuvarioidea)". Lepidopterorum catalogus : new series [Lepidopterorum catalogus: new series]. Vol. 1. Leiden; New York: E. J. Brill / Flora & Fauna Publications. ISBN 978-0-916846-45-9. LCCN 88020258. OCLC 18163823.
- Hering, E. M. (1951). Biology of the Leaf Miners. 's-Gravenhage: W. Junk. p. 420. LCCN 52001318.
- Hickey, L. J.; Hodges, R. W. (29 August 1975). "Lepidopteran Leaf Mine from the Early Eocene Wind River Formation of Northwestern Wyoming". Science. 189 (4204): 718–720. Bibcode:1975Sci...189..718H. doi:10.1126/science.189.4204.718. ISSN 1095-9203. PMID 17792539.
- Hinton, H. E. (January 1958). "The Phylogeny of the Panorpoid Orders". Annual Review of Entomology. 3: 181–206. doi:10.1146/annurev.en.03.010158.001145.
- Hubner, J. (1822) - Systematisches-alphabetisches Verzeichniss aller bisher bey den Furbeeldungen zur Sammlung europaischer Schmetterlinge angegebenen Gattungsbenennungen; mit Vormerkung auch augsburgischer Gattungen. Augusta: Hubner vi 82 pp.
- Imms, A. (1957). A general textbook of entomology; including the anatomy, physiology, development, and classification of insects (9th ed., entirely rev. by O. W. Richards and R. G. Davies ed.). London: Methuen & Co. p. 886. OCLC 606219551.
- Janse, A. J. T., ed. (1945). "Part 2". The Moths of South Africa. Vol. 4. Durban: Commercial Printing Co. pp. 79–148. OCLC 873031073.
- Keifer, H. H. (1927). "California Microlepidoptera". The Pan-Pacific Entomologist. 3 (3): 136–138. ISSN 0031-0603.
- Kobayashi, Y. (1998) - Embryogenesis of the fairy moth, Nemophora albiantennella Issiki (Lepidoptera, Adelidae), with special emphasis on its phylogenetic implications. International Journal of Insect Morphology and Embryology 27(3): 157-166.
- Kristensen, N. P. (1968). "The Morphological and Functional Evolution of the Mouthparts in Adult Lepidoptera". Opuscula Entomologica. 33: 69–72. ISSN 0375-0205.
- Kristensen, N. P. (1968). "The Anatomy of the Head and the Alimentary Canal of Adult Eriocraniidae (Lep., Dacnonypha)". Entomologiske Meddelelser. 36: 239–315. ISSN 0013-8851.
- Kristensen, N. P. (February 1970). "Morphological Observations on the Wing Scales in Some Primitive Lepidoptera (Insecta)". Journal Ultrastructure Research. 30 (3–4): 402–410. doi:10.1016/S0022-5320(70)80071-5. ISSN 0022-5320. PMID 5417552.
- Kristensen, N. P. (1984). "Studies on the morphology and systematics of primitive Lepidoptera (Insecta)". Steenstrupia. 10 (5): 141–191. ISSN 0375-2909.
- Kristensen, N. P. (1991). "Morphology and phylogeny of the lowest Lepidoptera-Glossata: Recent progress and unforeseen problems". Bulletin of the Sugadaira Montane Research Centre. 11: 105–106. ISSN 0913-6800.
- Kristensen, N. P., ed. (1999) [1998]. Handbuch der Zoologie / Handbook of Zoology, Band 4: Arthropoda - 2. Halfte: Insecta - Lepidoptera, moths and butterflies [Handbook of Zoology, Vol. 4: Arthropoda - Insecta - Lepidoptera, moths and butterflies]. Vol. Teilband/Part 35: Volume 1: Evolution, systematics, and biogeography. Kukenthal, W. (Ed.), Fischer, M. (Scientific Ed.) (Reprint 2013 ed.). Berlin, New York: Walter de Gruyter. p. 491. ISBN 978-3-11-015704-8. OCLC 174380917.
- Kristensen, N. P.; Nielsen, E. S. (1979). "A new subfamily of micropterigid moths from South America. A contribution to the morphology and phylogeny of the Micropterigidae, with a generic catalogue of the family (Lepidoptera: Zeugloptera)". Steenstrupia. 5 (7): 69–147. ISSN 0375-2909.
- Kristensen, N. P.; Nielsen, E. S. (1982). "South American micropterigid moths: two new genera of the Sabatinca-group (Lepidoptera: Micropterigidae)". Insect Systematics & Evolution. 13 (4): 513–529. doi:10.1163/187631282X00318. ISSN 1399-560X.
- Kristensen, N. P.; Nielsen, E. S. (June 1983). "The Heterohathmia life history elucidated: immature stages contradict assignment to suborder Zeugloptera (Insecta, Lepidoptera)". Zeitschrift für zoologische Systematik und Evolutionsforschung. 21 (2): 101–124. doi:10.1111/j.1439-0469.1983.tb00280.x. ISSN 0044-3808.
- Kristensen, N. P.; Scoble, M. J.; Karsholt, O. (21 December 2007). "Lepidoptera phylogeny and systematics: the state of inventorying moth and butterfly diversity" (PDF). Zootaxa. 1668: 699–747. doi:10.11646/zootaxa.1668.1.30. ISSN 1175-5326.
- Kuchlein, J. H. & Ellis, W. N. (1997) - Climate-induced changes in the microlepidoptera fauna of the Netherlands and the implications for nature conservation. Journal of Insect Conservation 1: 73-80.
- Kuppers, P. V. (1980) - Untersuchungen zur Taxonomie und Phylogenie der Westpalaarktischen Adelinae (Lepidoptera: Adelidae). Wissenschaftliche Beitrage Karlsruhe, no. 7. M. Wahl, 497 pp. ISBN 3881470085, 9783881470087.
- Kyrki, J. (1983). "Adult abdominal sternum II in ditrysian tineoid superfamities - morphology and phylogenetic significance (Lepidoptera)". Annales entomologici Fennici / Suomen hyonteistieteellinen aikakauskirja. 49: 89–94. ISSN 0003-4428.
- Lewis, S. E. (15 September 1969). "Lepidopterous Larval-mining of an Oak(?) Leaf from the Latah Formation (Miocene) of Eastern Washington". Annals of the Entomological Society of America. 62 (5): 1210–1211. doi:10.1093/aesa/62.5.1210. ISSN 1938-2901.
- McDunnough, J. (1939). Check list of the Lepidoptera of Canada and the United States of America. Part 2: Microlepidoptera. Memoirs of the Southern California Academy of Sciences. Vol. 2. Los Angeles: Southern California Academy of Sciences. p. 171. LCCN 39006358.
- Meyrick, E. (1893 (1892)) - Descriptions of Australian Micro-lepidoptera. XVI. Tineidae. Proceedings of the Linnean Society of New South Wales 2-n.s. 7(4): 477-612.
- Meyrick, E. (1906) - Descriptions of Indian Microlepidoptera II. Journal of the Bombay Natural History Society 17: 133-153, 403-417.
- Meyrick, E. (1912) - Exotic Microlepidoptera. Vol. 1(1-2): 1-32, 33-64.
- Meyrick, E. (1912). Lepidoptera Heterocera, fam. Micropterygidae. Genera Insectorum. Vol. fasc. 132. Brussels: V. Verteneuil & L. Desmet. p. 9. OCLC 4063244.
- Meyrick, E. (1912) - Lepidoptera Heterocera (Tineae) Fam. Adelidae. Genera Insectorum 133: 1-12, pl. 1.
- Minet, J. (1991). "Tentative reconstruction of the ditrysian phylogeny (Lepidoptera: Glossata)". Insect Systematics & Evolution. 22 (1): 69–95. doi:10.1163/187631291x00327. ISSN 1399-560X.
- Moschler, H. B. (1884) - Beitrage zur Schmetterlings-Fauna des Kaffernlandes. Verhandlungen der Zoologisch-Botanischen Gesellschaft in Wien 33: 267-310.
- Mutanen, M.; Wahlberg, N.; Kaila, L. (5 May 2010). "Comprehensive gene and taxon coverage elucidates radiation patterns in moths and butterflies". Proceedings of the Royal Society B. 277 (1695): 2839–2848. doi:10.1098/rspb.2010.0392. ISSN 1471-2954. PMC 2981981. PMID 20444718.
- Mutuura, A. (July 1972). "Morphology of the Female Terminalia in Lepidoptera, and Its Taxonomic Significance". The Canadian Entomologist. 104 (7): 1055–1071. doi:10.4039/Ent1041055-7. ISSN 1918-3240.
- Newman, E. (1856) - Characters of a few Australian Lepidoptera, collected by Mr. Thomas R. Oxley. Transactions of the Entomological Society of London 2 3(8): 281-300, pl. 18.
- Nielsen, E. S.; Davis, D. R. (July 1985). "The first southern hemisphere prodoxid and the phylogeny of the Incurvarioidea (Lepidoptera)". Systematic Entomology. 10 (3): 307–322. doi:10.1111/j.1365-3113.1985.tb00525.x. ISSN 0307-6970.
- Nielsen, E. S., Edwards, E. D. & Rangsi, T. V. (1996) - Checklist of the Lepidoptera of Australia. Monographs on Australian Lepidoptera 4: i-xiv, 1-529 & CD-ROM.
- Nielsen, E. S.; Kristensen, N. P. (1996). "The Australian moth family Lophocoronidae and the basal phylogeny of the Lepidoptera-Glossata". Invertebrate Taxonomy. 10 (6): 1199–1302. doi:10.1071/IT9961199. ISSN 0818-0164.
- Opler, P. A. (December 1974). Biology, Ecology and Host Specificity of Microlepidoptera associated with Quercus agrifolia (Fagaceae). University of California Publications in Entomology. Vol. 75. Berkeley: University of California Press. p. 83. ISBN 978-0-520-09500-7. LCCN 73620117. OCLC 1203210.
- Philpott, A. W. B. (1927). "The maxillae in the Lepidoptera". Transactions and Proceedings of the New Zealand Institute. 57: 721–746.
- Philpott, A. (December 1927). "Notes on the Female Genitalia in the Micropterygoidea". Transactions of the Royal Entomological Society of London. 1927 (2): 319–323. Bibcode:1927EcoEn..75..319P. doi:10.1111/j.1365-2311.1927.tb00078.x. ISSN 0035-8894.
- Pogue, M. G. (April 2009). "Lepidoptera biodiversity". In Foottit, R. G.; Adler, P. H. (eds.). Insect Biodiversity: Science and Society. Chichester, UK; Hoboken, NJ: Wiley; Blackwell Science Publishing. p. 632. ISBN 978-1-4051-5142-9. LCCN 2008042545. OCLC 156816238.
- Powell, J. A.; Opler, P. A. (May 2009). Moths of Western North America. Berkeley, California: University of California Press. p. 369. ISBN 978-0-520-25197-7. LCCN 2008048605. OCLC 646846811.
- Razowski, J. (31 January 1974). "Phylogeny and Classification of Lepidoptera". Acta Zoologica Cracoviensia. 19 (1): 1–18. ISSN 0065-1710.
- Rosenstock, R. (1885) - Notes on Australian Lepidoptera, with descriptions of new species. Annals and Magazine of Natural History 5 16: 376-385, 421-443.
- Sbordoni V. & Forestiero S. (1984) - Il mondo delle farfalle. Arnoldo Mondadori Editore, 312 pp.
- Scoble, M. J. (2011) [1992]. The Lepidoptera: Form, Function and Diversity (2nd ed.). London: Oxford University Press & Natural History Museum. p. 404. ISBN 978-0-19-854952-9. LCCN 92004297. OCLC 25282932.
- Shepard, H. H. (1 June 1930). "The Pleural and Sternal Sclerites of the Lepidopterous Thorax". Annals of the Entomological Society of America. 23 (2): 237–260. doi:10.1093/aesa/23.2.237. ISSN 1938-2901.
- Sohn, J. C., Labandeira, C., Davis, D. R. and Mitter, C. (2012) - An annotated catalog of fossil and subfossil Lepidoptera (Insecta: Holometabola) of the world. Zootaxa 3286: 1-132.
- Stehr, F. W., ed. (1991) [1987]. Immature Insects. Vol. 2. Dubuque, Iowa: Kendall/Hunt Pub. Co. p. 754. ISBN 978-0-8403-3702-3. LCCN 85081922. OCLC 13784377.
- Stekol'nikov, A. A. (1967). "Functional Morphology of the Copulatory Apparatus in the Primitive Lepidoptera and General Evolutionary Trends In the Genitalia of the Lepidoptera". Entomological Review (in Russian and English). 46 (3): 400–409. ISSN 0367-1445.
- Tillyard, R. J. (27 June 1919). "On the Morphology and Systematic Position of the Family Micropterygidae (Sens. Lat.)". Proceedings of the Linnean Society of New South Wales. 44: 95–136. ISSN 0370-047X.
- Tillyard, R. J. (1923). "On the Mouthparts of the Micropterygoidea (Order Lepidoptera)". Transactions of the Entomological Society of London. 1923: 181–206. ISSN 2053-2520.
- Turner, A. J. (1900) - New Micro-lepidoptera - mostly from Queensland. Transactions of the Royal Society of South Australia 24: 6–23.
- Turner, A. J. (1913) - Studies in Australian Microlepidoptera. Proceedings of the Linnean Society of New South Wales 38: 174–228.
- Van Nieukerken E. J., Wagner D. L., Baldessari M., Mazzon L., Angeli G., Girolami V., Duso C., Doorenweerd C. (2012) - Antispila oinophylla new species (Lepidoptera, Heliozelidae), a new North American grapevine leafminer invading Italian vineyards: taxonomy, DNA barcodes and life cycle. ZooKeys 170: 29–77. doi: 10.3897/zookeys.170.2617
- Viette, P. (1947). "Revision du Catalogue des Lepidopteres Homoneures (Famille des Micropterygidae)" [Revision of the catalogue of homoneurous Lepidoptera (family Micropterygidae)]. Revue Française d'Entomologie (in French). 14 (1): 24–31. ISSN 0375-0868.
- Walker, F. (1863) - Tortricites & Tineites. List of the Specimens of Lepidopterous Insects in the Collection of the British Museum 28: 287–561.
- Walker, F. (1866) - Supplement 5. In, List of the Specimens of Lepidopterous Insects in the Collection of the British Museum. Vol. 35: 1534–2040.
- Wiegmann, B. M.; Mitter, C.; Regier, J. C.; Friedlander, T. P.; Wagner, D. M.; Nielsen, E. S. (May 2000). "Nuclear genes resolve Mesozoic-aged divergences in the insect order Lepidoptera". Molecular Phylogenetics and Evolution. 15 (2): 242–259. Bibcode:2000MolPE..15..242W. doi:10.1006/mpev.1999.0746. ISSN 1095-9513. PMID 10837154.
- Wojtusiak, J. (1999). "A new type of scent organ in Lepidoptera: a giant thoracic pheromone-disseminating structure in a male incurvarioid moth (Lepidoptera, Adelidae)". Journal of Natural History. 33 (6): 819–824. Bibcode:1999JNatH..33..819W. doi:10.1080/002229399300137. ISSN 0022-2933.
- Zeller, P. C. (1852) - Lepidoptera Microptera quae J.A. Wahlberg in Caffrorum terra collegit. Stockholm: Norstedt 120 pp.
