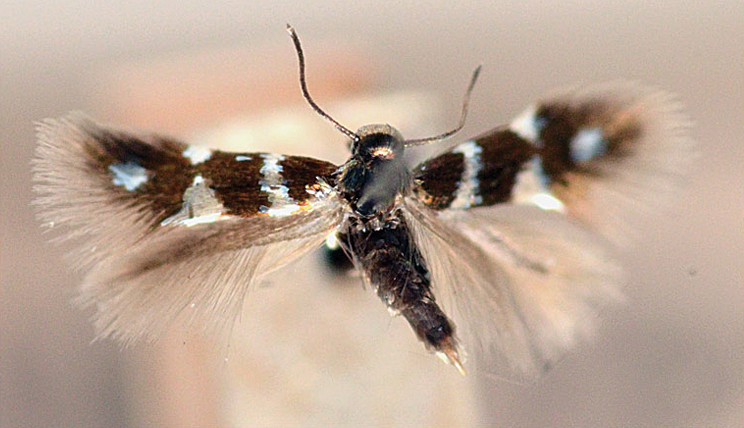
- Holotype specimen of A. argentifera
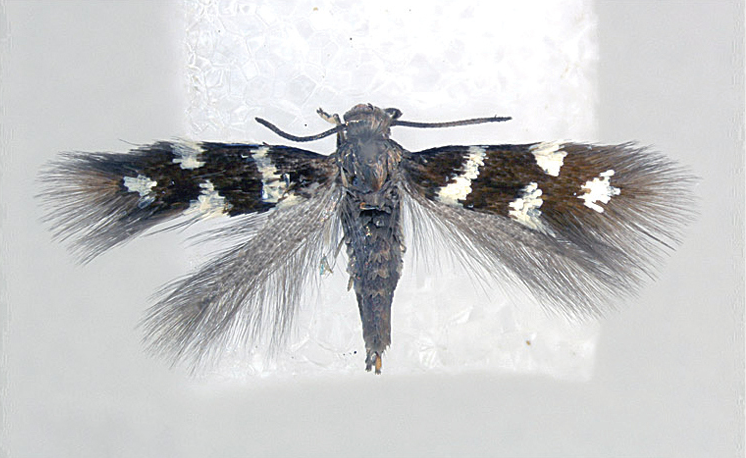
- Adult female A. argentifera

Scientific classification
- Kingdom: Animalia
- Phylum: Arthropoda
- Clade: Pancrustacea
- Class: Insecta
- Order: Lepidoptera
- Family: Heliozelidae
- Genus: Aspilanta
- Species: A. argentifera

Binomial name
- Aspilanta argentifera (Braun, 1927)

Synonyms
- Antispila argentifera Braun, 1927

= Aspilanta argentifera =

Species of moth

Aspilanta argentifera is a species of moth in the family Heliozelidae, first described by Annette Frances Braun in 1927. It is found in eastern North America. The larvae are leaf miners that feed on several species of plant in the family Myricaceae.

== Distribution ==
A. argentifera can be found in eastern Canada (Newfoundland, Nova Scotia, Ontario, Prince Edward Island, Quebec) and the northeastern United States (Connecticut, Massachusetts, New York, North Carolina, Vermont).

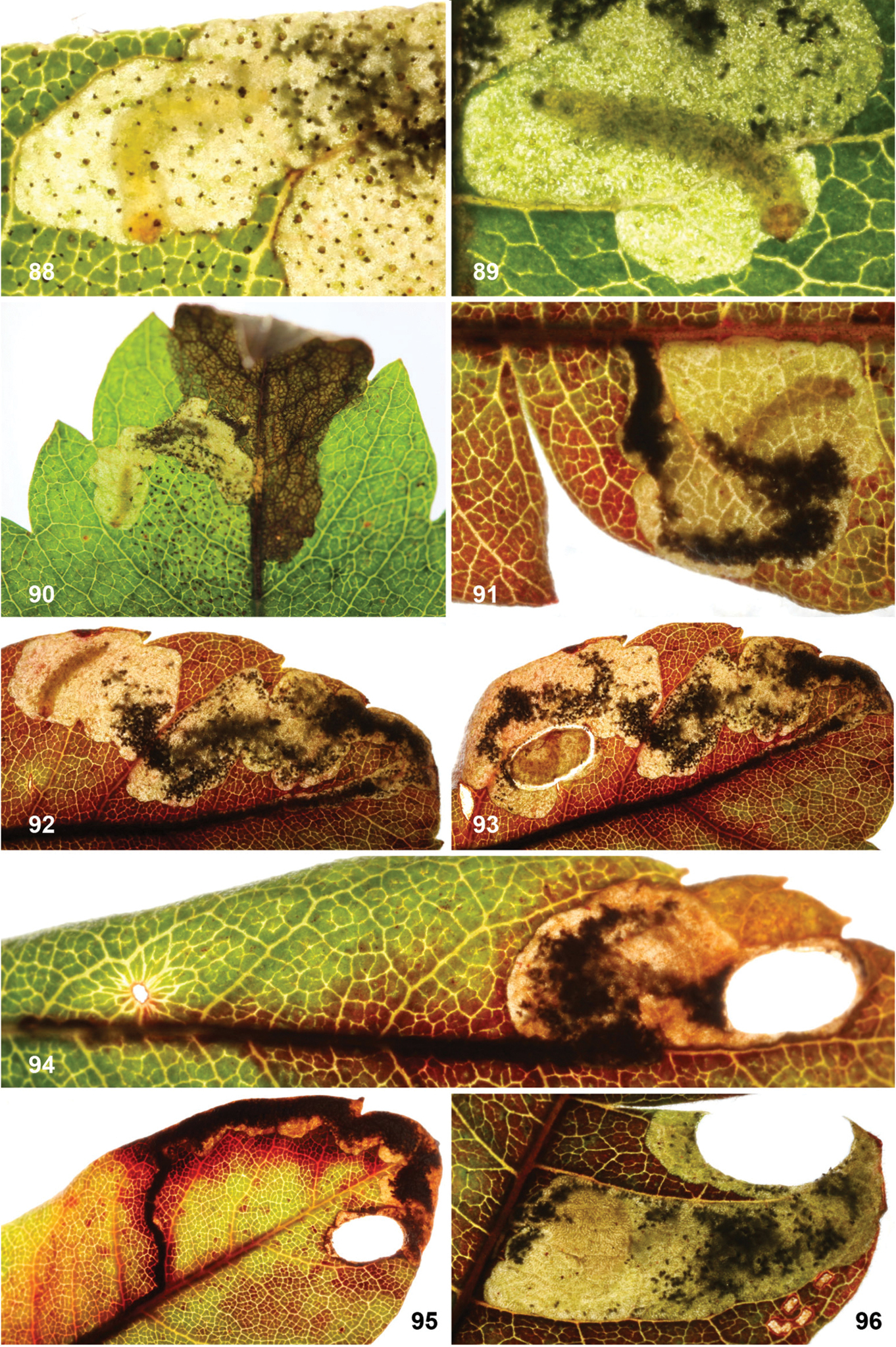
Larvae and leaf mines of A. argentifera on various host plants

== Description ==
Adult A. argentifera have a wingspan of 4.0–5.2 mm (0.16–0.20 in), with each forewing measuring 1.8–2.4 mm (0.071–0.094 in) in length. The head is golden brown with brown antennae, and the thorax and forewings are dark brown with bright silvery white markings. Externally, A. argentifera are similar to Aspilanta ampelopsifoliella and Aspilanta oinophylla, but can be differentiated by the darker scales on the head.

The larvae are a pale yellowish green, with a brown head and prothorax. Their host plants include sweetfern (Comptonia peregrina), Morella caroliniensis, Morella cerifera, and Myrica gale. Braun's original 1927 description theorized that the host plant for A. argentifera was paper birch (Betula papyrifera), however, a 2020 paper posits that this was a case of mistaken identity, and that the mines on birch leaves seen by Braun and attributed to A. argentifera likely belonged to the larvae of a species of incurvariid moth, Phylloporia bistrigella, instead.

The leaf mine begins with a linear portion that follows the midrib of the leaf towards the leaf tip, eventually widening into a small blotch that extends from the midrib to the edge of the leaf. The frass of the larvae is blackish. When mature and ready to pupate, the larvae cut out a 2.5–3.5 mm (0.098–0.138 in) long case from their host leaf, leaving an elliptic hole.
