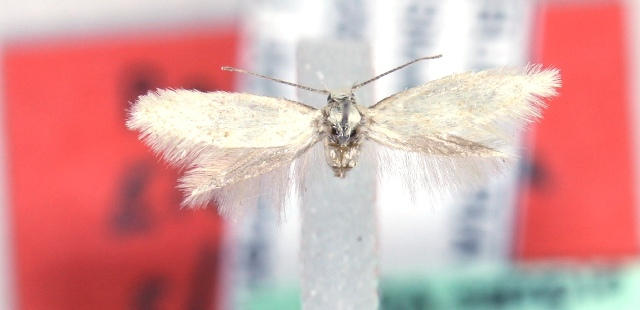

Scientific classification
- Kingdom: Animalia
- Phylum: Arthropoda
- Clade: Pancrustacea
- Class: Insecta
- Order: Lepidoptera
- Family: Elachistidae
- Genus: Elachista
- Species: E. slivenica

Binomial name
- Elachista slivenica Kaila, 2007

= Elachista slivenica =

Species of moth

Elachista slivenica is a species of moth that belongs to the grass-miner moth (Elachistidae) family. It is found in Bulgaria.

== Taxonomy ==
This species was described in 2007 by Lauri Kaila, a Finnish entomologist who specializes in the study of lepidopterans. It was done during a taxonomic revision of the species complex of Elachista bedellella. It, along with eight other species, were described based on subtle yet discernible differences in male genitalia. They differ in the shape of the juxta and the cornutus which correlate with differences in the outer appearance of different Elachista populations.

== Description ==
The forewings have a length of 4–4.3 mm.
