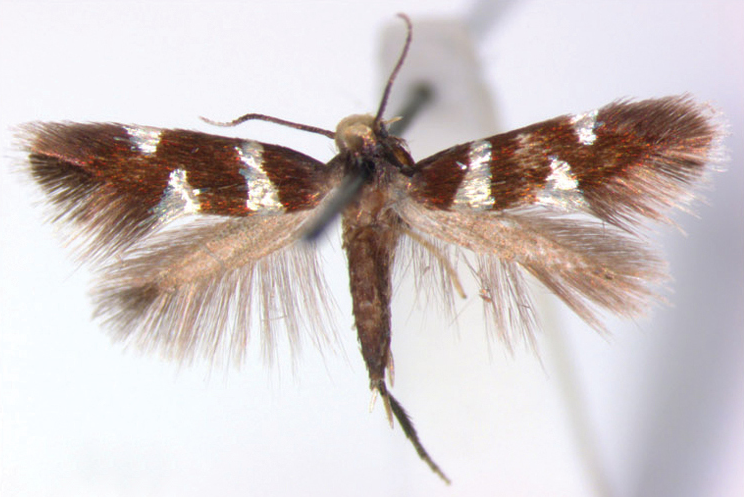
- Adult female A. viticordifoliella

Scientific classification
- Kingdom: Animalia
- Phylum: Arthropoda
- Clade: Pancrustacea
- Class: Insecta
- Order: Lepidoptera
- Family: Heliozelidae
- Genus: Aspilanta
- Species: A. viticordifoliella

Binomial name
- Aspilanta viticordifoliella (Clemens, 1860)

Synonyms
- Antispila viticordifoliella Clemens, 1860; Antispila cf. viticordifoliella van Nieukerken et al. 2012

= Aspilanta viticordifoliella =

Species of moth

Aspilanta viticordifoliella is a species of moth in the family Heliozelidae. It is found in eastern North America. The larvae are leaf miners that feed on Virginia creeper (Parthenocissus quinquefolia), false Virginia creeper (Parthenocissus vitacea), and frost grape (Vitis vulpina).

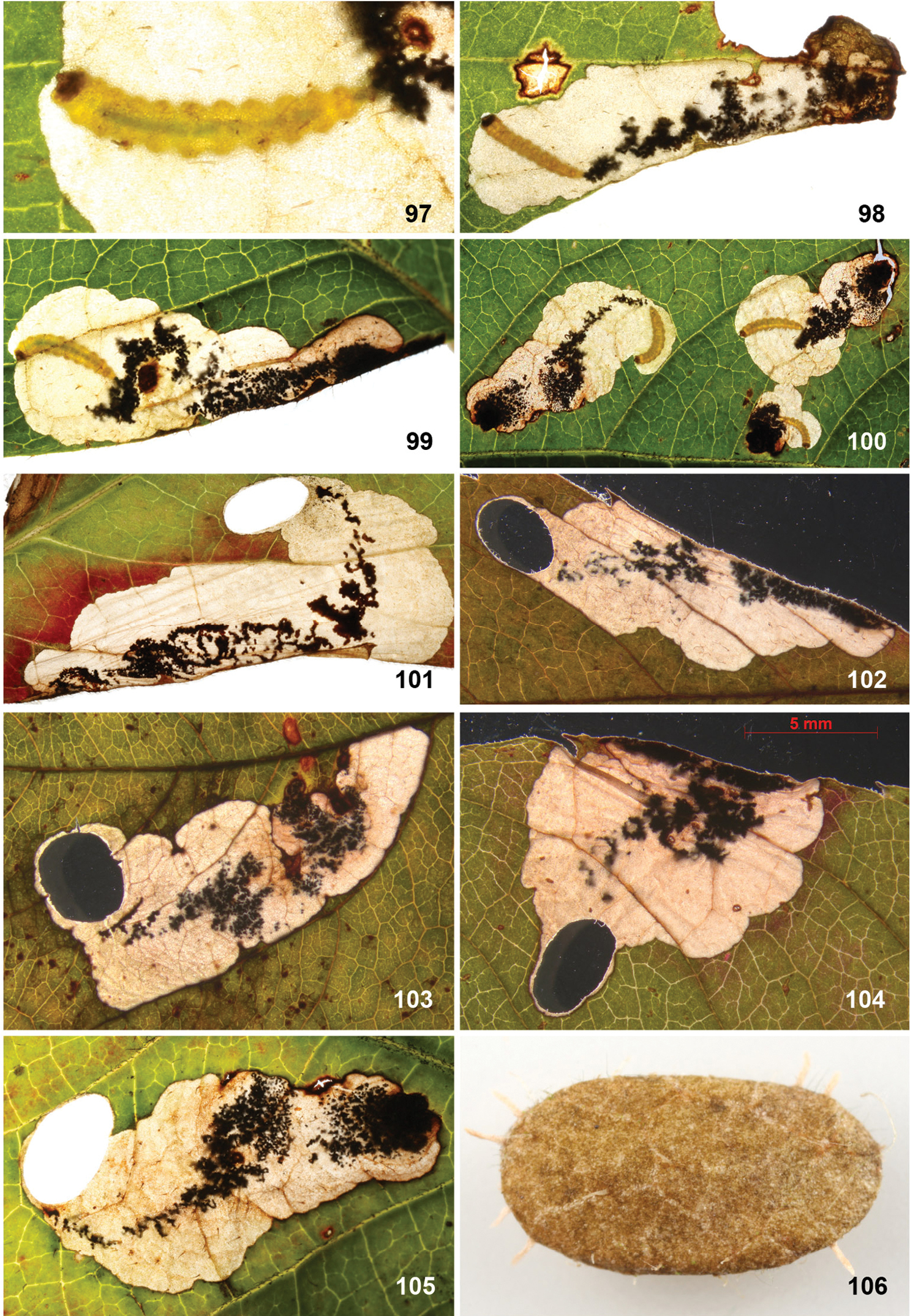
Larvae, leaf mines, and pupal cases of A. viticordifoliella on Parthenocissus quinquefolia and P. vitacea

== Distribution ==
Aspilanta viticordifoliella can be found in Canada (Ontario and Québec) and the United States (Connecticut, Florida, Kentucky, Massachusetts, New York, and Pennsylvania).

== Description ==
Adult A. viticordifoliella have a wingspan of around 5.5 mm (0.22 in), with each forewing measuring 2.2–2.5 mm (0.087–0.098 in). The adult moth is dark brown with silvery white markings on the forewings and white tipped antennae. They can be differentiated from other species of Aspilanta and various Antispila species by the lack of an apical spot on the forewings and white tipped antennae respectively.

The larvae are yellowish-green with green gut contents. The head and prothorax are dark brown.

The leaf mine usually begins as a rather compact blotch, sometimes preceded by a short linear portion. The frass of the larvae is black and placed in a thick clump towards the beginning of the mine, but more dispersed towards the center of the mine. When mature and ready to pupate, the larvae cut out a 3.5–4 mm (0.14–0.16 in) long case from their host leaf, leaving an elliptic hole.
