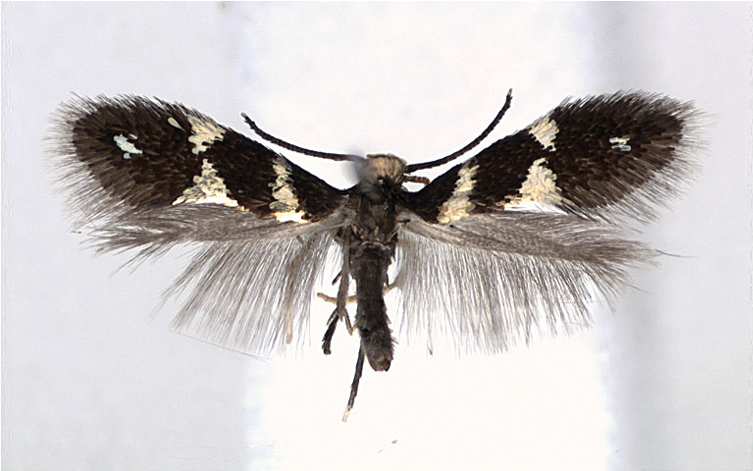
- Adult male A. oinophylla
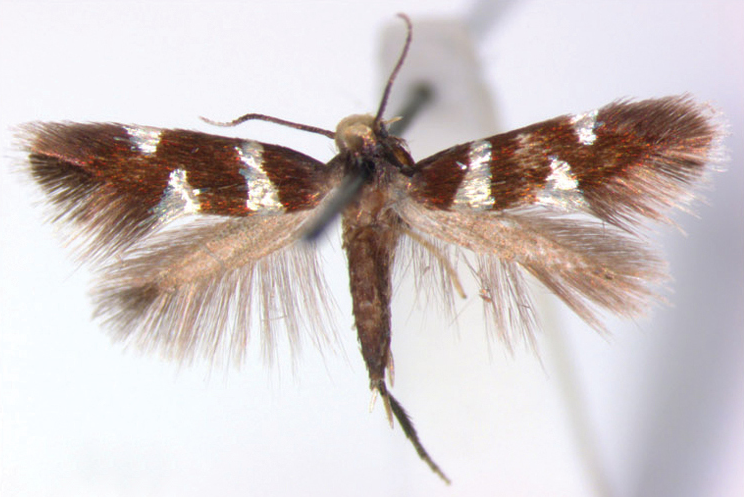
- Adult female A. viticordifoliella

Scientific classification
- Kingdom: Animalia
- Phylum: Arthropoda
- Clade: Pancrustacea
- Class: Insecta
- Order: Lepidoptera
- Family: Heliozelidae
- Genus: Aspilanta van Nieukerken & Eiseman, 2020

Type species
- Antispila oinophylla van Nieukerken & Wagner, 2012

Synonyms
- Antispila ampelopsifoliella group van Nieukerken et al. 2012; Antispila “group II” Milla et al. 2019

= Aspilanta =

Genus of moths

Aspilanta is a genus of very small moths in the family Heliozelidae that is native to North America. The larvae are leaf miners. Most Aspilanta species feed on Vitaceae with the exception of A. hydrangaeella and A. argentifera, which feed on species of hydrangea and Myricaceae respectively. The name of the genus is a partial anagram of Antispila.

== Description ==
Adult Aspilanta moths are very small, with a wingspan between 4.0–6.2 mm (0.16–0.24 in) and forewings measuring 1.8–2.8 mm (0.071–0.110 in) long. The forewings are patterned with a series of pale metallic markings. They differ from Antispila species in having reduced wing venation.

Eggs are inserted into the leaf tissue, typically near a vein or the leaf margin. The larvae are yellowish or whitish, usually with a dark brown head and prothorax. The leaf mine may start as a narrow linear mine that widens into a blotch or may start as a blotch, lacking a linear portion. All frass is deposited within the mine. When mature, the larvae cut out an elliptic case from the surface of their host leaf and descend to the ground to pupate.

== Species ==
This genus includes the following species:

- A. ampelopsifoliella (Chambers, 1874) – Canada, United States
- A. argentifera (Braun, 1927) – Canada, United States
- A. hydrangaeella (Chambers, 1874) – United States
- A. oinophylla (van Nieukerken & Wagner, 2012) – Canada, United States, Italy (as an introduced species)
- A. viticordifoliella (Clemens, 1860) – Canada, United States
- A. voraginella (Braun, 1927) – United States
