= Sam Jaffe (naturalist) =

American naturalist and photographer

- Born: 1982/1983
- Education: Brown University (BA); Antioch University New England (MS)
- Known for: The Caterpillar Lab; macro photography; science outreach
- Website: Sam Jaffe's photo galleries

Sam Jaffe (born 1982/83) is an American naturalist, science educator, and "caterpillar wrangler", known for macro photography and for science-outreach work with caterpillars, including founding The Caterpillar Lab.

== Early life and education ==
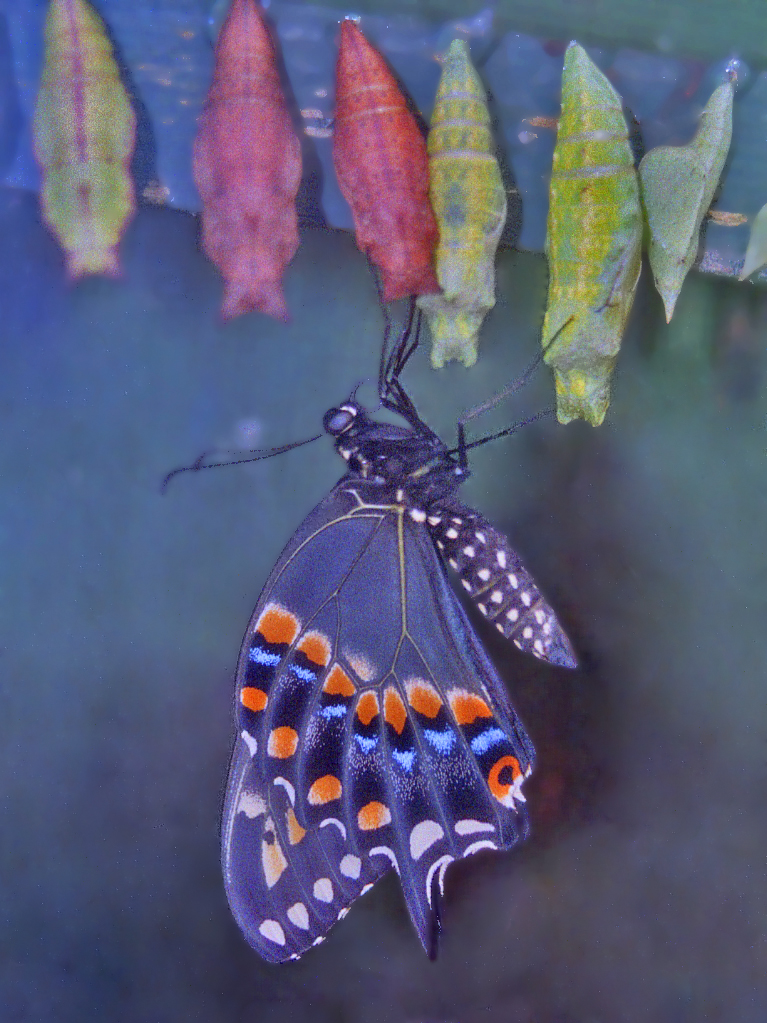
Black swallowtail butterfly (Papilio polyxenes) with chrysalides of different colors

Jaffe grew up in Newton, Massachusetts, where his parents encouraged his early interest in bringing home caterpillars and other small wildlife. Soon he was doing experiments such as seeing if black swallowtail caterpillars would make a different colored chrysalis depending on the color of their environment.

After graduating from Brown University in 2007 with a degree in ecology and evolutionary biology, he worked for a year in Harvard University's Department of Organismic and Evolutionary Biology, on a study of interactions between caterpillars and ants.

Later, he attended Antioch University New England (AUNE), where he earned a master's degree in environmental science in 2014.

== Career ==
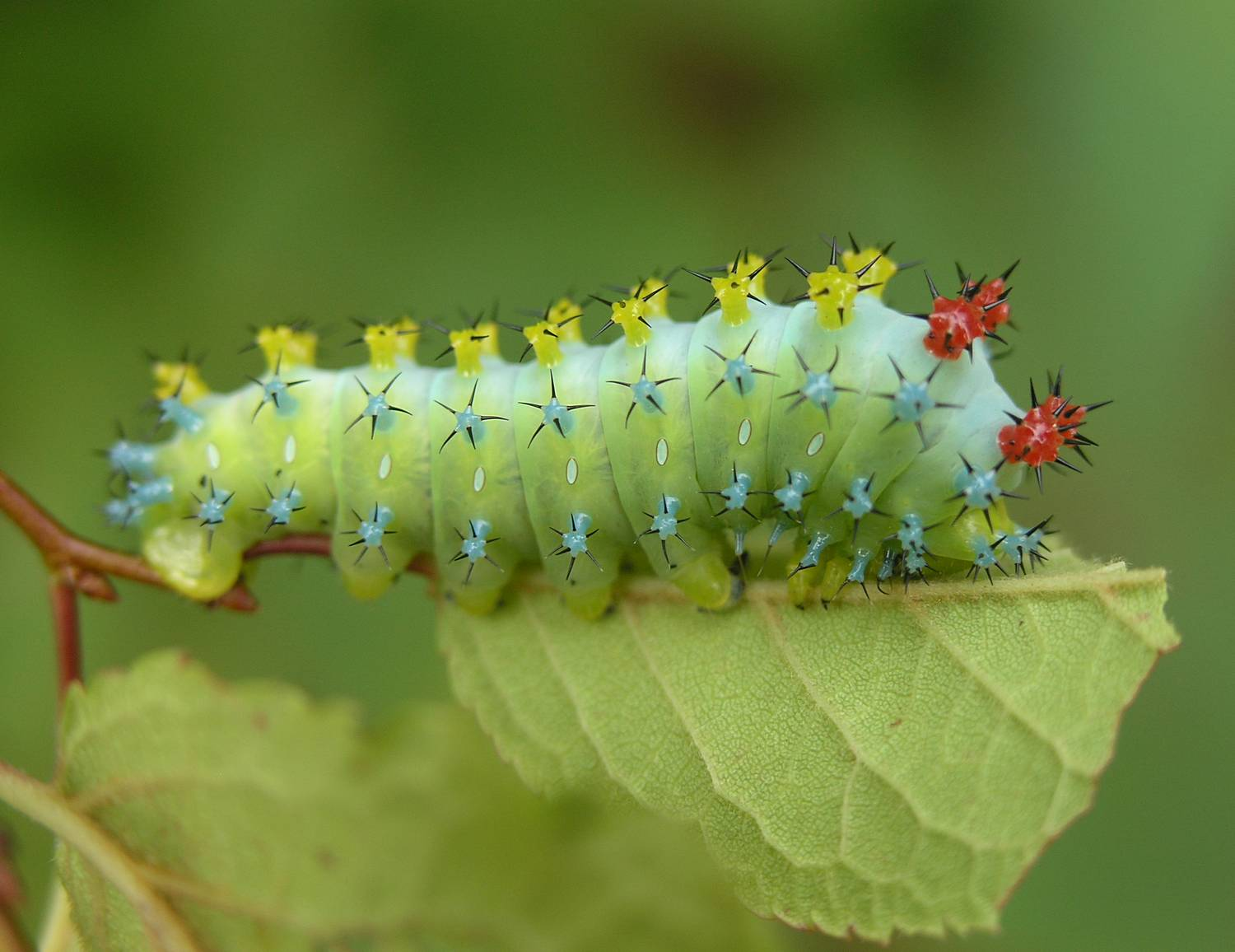
The larva of giant cecropia moth (Hyalophora cecropia) is one of Jaffe's favorite caterpillars and served as his "plus-one" at a 2017 awards ceremony.

In 2008, Jaffe began exhibiting his macro photographs of caterpillars in local art galleries. Because Jaffe enjoyed bringing "wine, cheese and live caterpillars" to his photo exhibits, he says, "the gallery openings turned into live caterpillar shows, and it just went crazy from there."

In 2013, Jaffe used Kickstarter to support him in raising and showing live caterpillars. When the BBC offered to pay him to raise "special, rare, and charismatic" caterpillars for the New England segment of Earth's Greatest Spectacles, he enlisted classmates to help him raise and feed caterpillars in his Keene, New Hampshire, apartment.

=== Caterpillar Lab ===
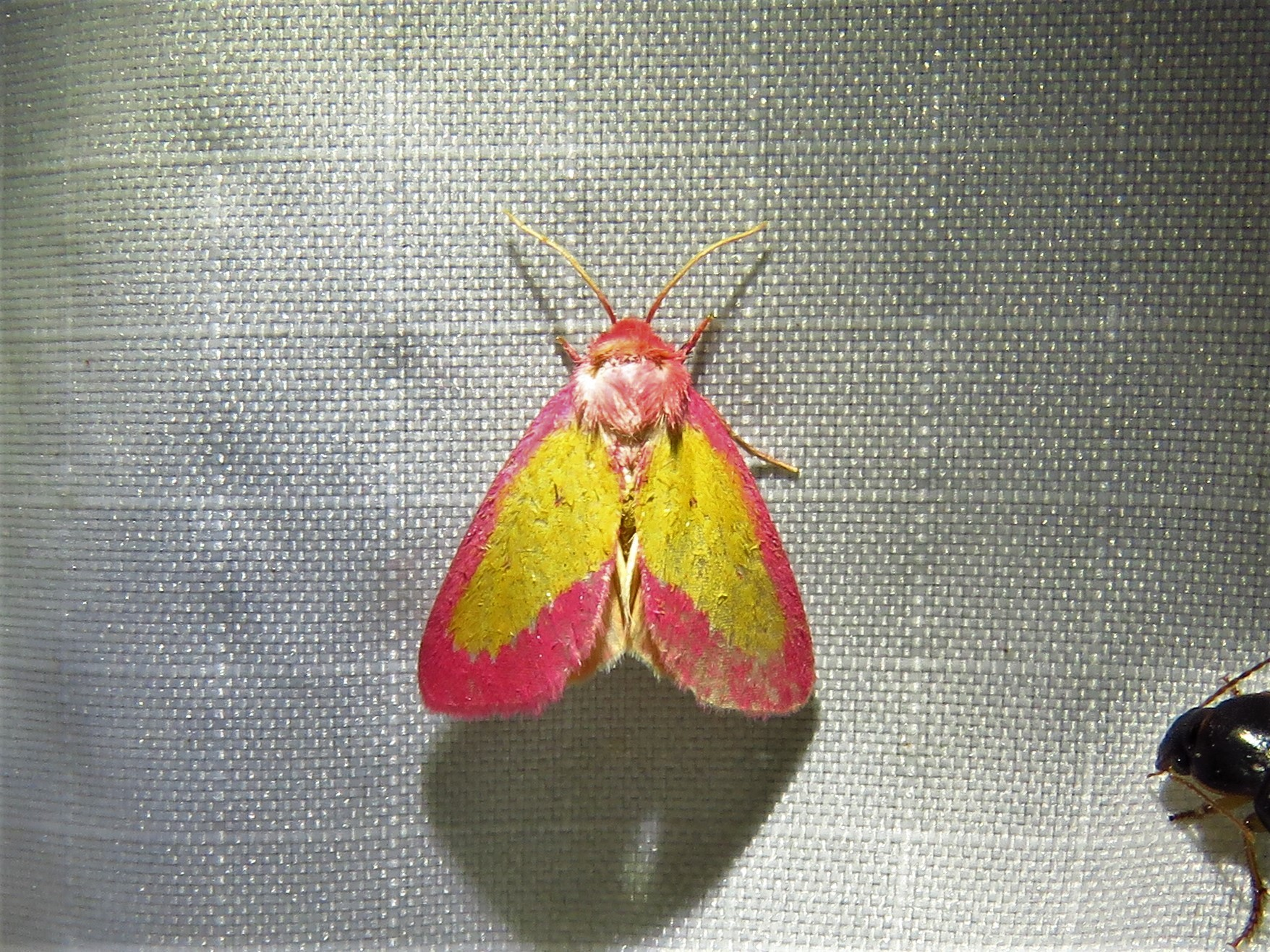
Pink star moth, a widespread but uncommon species, whose previously unknown caterpillar was discovered by Caterpillar Lab members in 2024

In 2013, Jaffe founded the Caterpillar Lab, a non-profit organization that showcases the lives of caterpillars, their predators, and their parasites. According to the Keene Sentinel, "The Caterpillar Lab is primarily a research facility that raises thousands of caterpillars and takes them to museums, schools and camps for awareness and outreach programs about native insects." The Caterpillar Lab is located in Marlborough, New Hampshire, where it moved from downtown Keene in 2018. Local scientific outreach includes "caterpillar workshops", moth lighting events, and nature walks.

The Caterpillar Lab also hosts events beyond its local NH region, where visitors can meet with lab docents and wander among displays of living caterpillars from varied species. At such events, according to the Discovery Museum in Acton, Massachusetts, "The Lab uses live, native New England caterpillars to educate and create an appreciation for the incredible natural value of their backyards, neighborhoods, and green spaces." Their displays feature annually in Mothapalooza events hosted by Arc of Appalachia in Ohio.

Jaffe and the lab also take part in scientific research, for example the effect of emerald ash borer beetles. On a nature walk in 2024, Caterpillar Lab intern Logan Dieck discovered the previously unknown caterpillar of Derrima stellata, a species that entomologist David L. Wagner describes as "the Holy Grail for moth life histories in the East Coast."

=== Recognition ===
In 2017, the third-annual Ruth and James Ewing Arts Awards event in Keene, New Hampshire, honored Jaffe's photography, describing him as "a naturalist photographer and science educator whose true passion is more Charles Darwin than Ansel Adams." According to the Keene Sentinel, one of the event's co-sponsors, "The cecropia caterpillar he brought as his plus-one drew quite a crowd."

In 2021, the Cheshire County Conservation District named Jaffe the county's Educator of the Year. The annual award is given to "an outstanding educator in Cheshire County that has instilled a conservation ethic in their students and has a strong commitment to environmental stewardship."

Jaffe and his macro cinematography of caterpillars feature in a 2025 one-hour documentary The Extraordinary Caterpillar – A Film Celebration of Nature's Unsung Heroes. As of 2025, Jaffe was under contract with Cornell University Press for "a scholarly book of caterpillar, butterfly, and moth histories."
