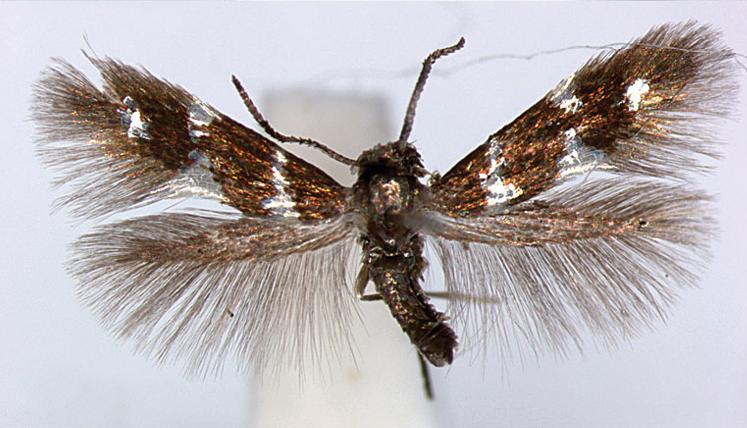
- Adult male A. voraginella

Scientific classification
- Kingdom: Animalia
- Phylum: Arthropoda
- Class: Insecta
- Order: Lepidoptera
- Family: Heliozelidae
- Genus: Aspilanta
- Species: A. voraginella

Binomial name
- Aspilanta voraginella (Braun, 1927)

Synonyms
- Antispila voraginella Braun, 1927

= Aspilanta voraginella =

Species of moth

Aspilanta voraginella is a species of moth in the family Heliozelidae, first described by Annette Frances Braun in 1927. It is found in the United States (Arizona, Texas, and Utah). The larvae are leaf miners that feed on Vitis arizonica.

== Description ==
Adult A. voraginella have a wingspan of 4.7–5.4 mm (0.19–0.21 in), with each forewing measuring 2.3–2.6 mm (0.091–0.102 in) in length. The head, antennae, and thorax are dark brown. The wings are dark brown with pale markings, and the legs are blackish. Externally, adult A. voraginella are very similar to Aspilanta oinophylla but may be differentiated by the dark brown scales on the head.

The larvae are pale yellowish, with the head and prothorax slightly darker. The mouthparts are dark brown and there is a row of 5–7 brown spots on the abdomen. The larvae are gregarious leaf miners and feed on Vitis arizonica.

The leaf mine is a white or yellowish blotch, lacking any linear portion, and often conjoined with the mines of other A. voraginella larvae on the same leaf. The frass is greenish black and placed irregularly near the center of the mine. When mature and ready to pupate, the larva cuts out a broadly elliptical case that may be somewhat lopsided.
