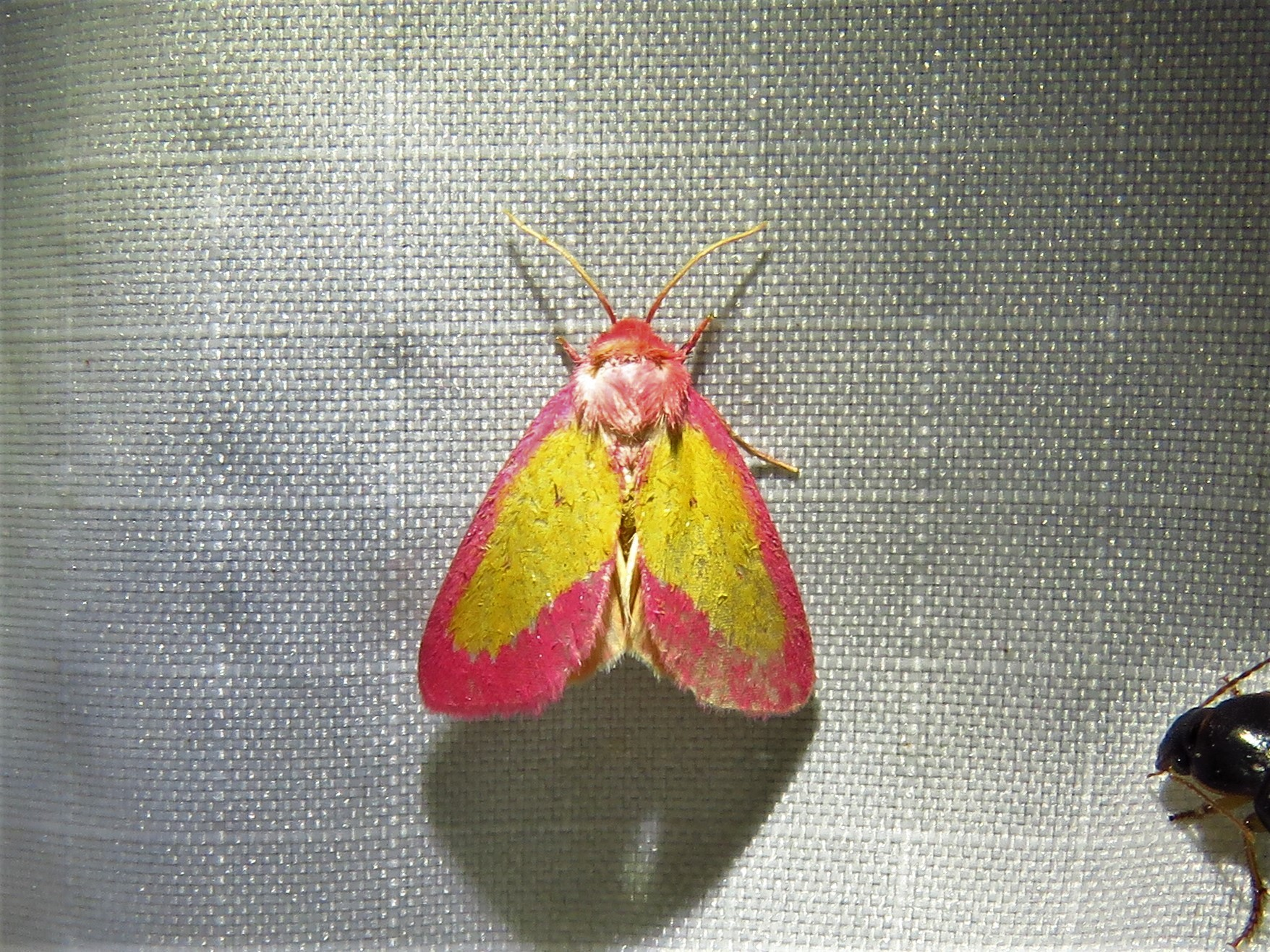

Conservation status
- Apparently Secure (NatureServe)

Scientific classification
- Kingdom: Animalia
- Phylum: Arthropoda
- Clade: Pancrustacea
- Class: Insecta
- Order: Lepidoptera
- Superfamily: Noctuoidea
- Family: Noctuidae
- Genus: Derrima
- Species: D. stellata

Binomial name
- Derrima stellata Walker, 1858

Synonyms
- Derrima henrietta (Grote, 1864); Derrima cinocentralis Strand, 1912

= Derrima stellata =

Pink star moth

Species of moth

Derrima stellata, the pink star moth, is a species of moth of the family Noctuidae. It is found from in the eastern United States from southern Maine to Florida, west to Missouri and Texas in maritime sand dunes and heathland.

== Description ==
The wingspan is 21–30 mm. Adults are on wing from April to May and from July to August. There are two generations per year.

== Conservation ==
It is listed as a species of special concern in Connecticut. It is also considered endangered in New York and Virginia, as well as vulnerable in Massachusetts.

== Ecology ==
For many years, according to David L. Wagner, "the Holy Grail for moth life histories in the East Coast was the pink star moth." In 2024, however, Caterpillar Lab intern Logan Dieck discovered a small caterpillar apparently feeding on seeds of a dead pinweed plant in southern NH. By collecting more caterpillars and overwintering their pupae, caterpillar expert Sam Jaffe confirmed that these were larvae of the pink star moth.
