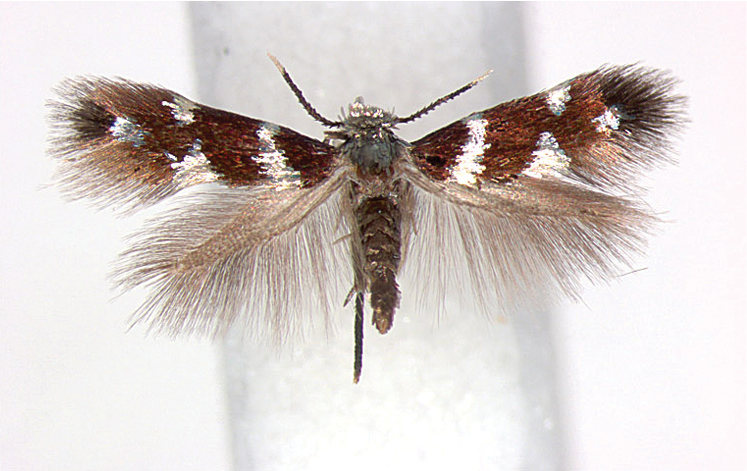
- Adult female A. hydrangaeella

Scientific classification
- Kingdom: Animalia
- Phylum: Arthropoda
- Clade: Pancrustacea
- Class: Insecta
- Order: Lepidoptera
- Family: Heliozelidae
- Genus: Aspilanta
- Species: A. hydrangaeella

Binomial name
- Aspilanta hydrangaeella (Chambers, 1874)

Synonyms
- Antispila hydrangaeella Chambers, 1874; Antispila hydrangiaeella Chambers, 1878

= Aspilanta hydrangaeella =

Species of moth

Aspilanta hydrangaeella is a species of moth in the family Heliozelidae. It is found in the United States. The larvae are leaf miners that feed on hydrangea plants.

== Distribution ==
Aspilanta hydrangaeella is found in the eastern United States, including Georgia, Illinois, Kentucky, Maryland, North Carolina, Ohio, and Tennessee.

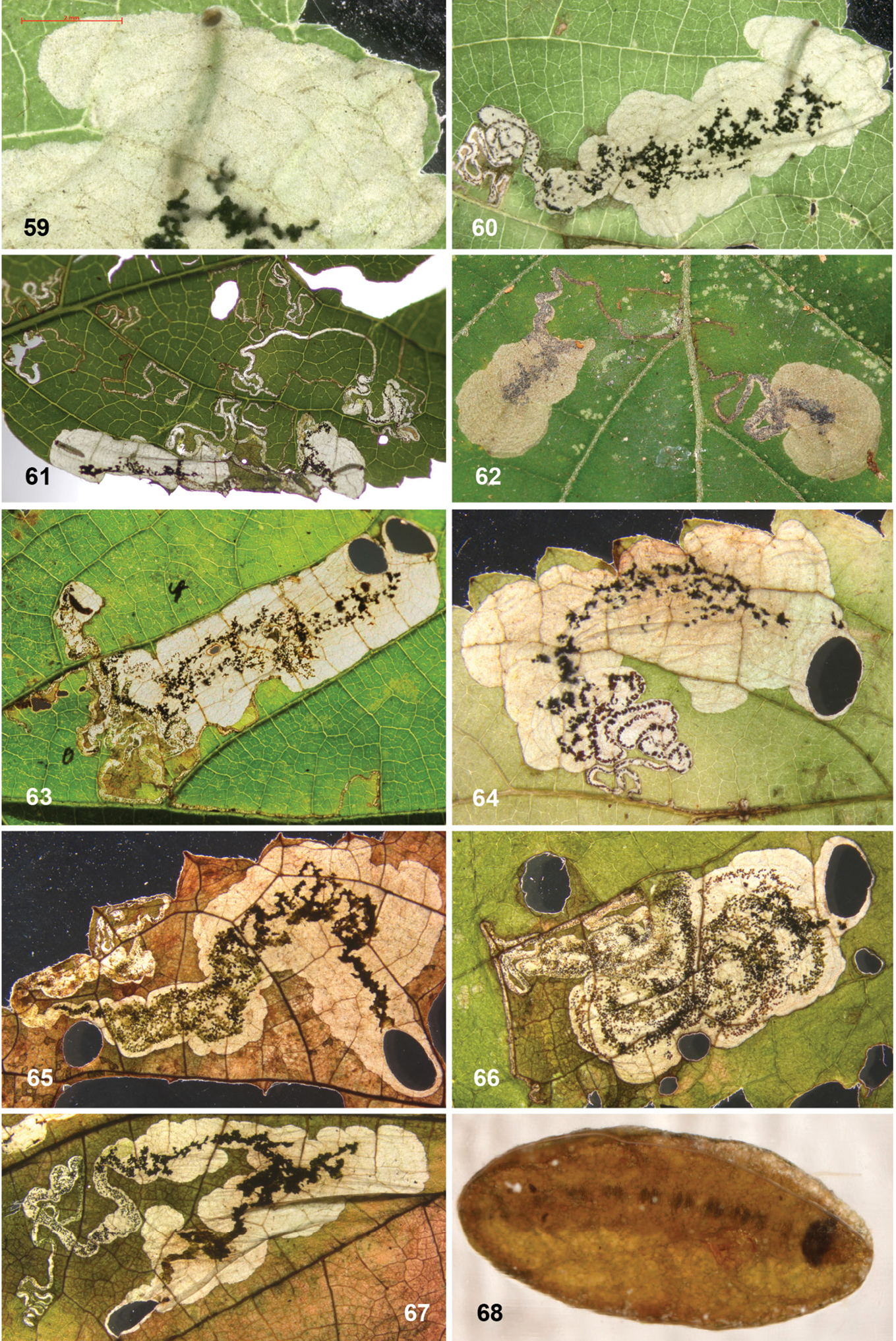
Larvae, leaf mines, and pupal cases of A. hydrangaeella on H. arborescens.

== Description ==
Adult A. hydrangaeella have a wingspan of 5.0–5.8 mm (0.20–0.23 in), with each forewing measuring 2.2–2.8 mm (0.087–0.110 in) in length. Externally, adult A. hydrangaeella are similar to other moths in the genus Aspilanta, but can be differentiated by their antennae – the antennae of A. hydrangaeella have noticeable white tips.

The larvae are colorless or whitish, except for their green gut contents, with a dark brown head and prothorax. Darker spots may be visible on some body segments. Their primary host plant is smooth hydrangea (Hydrangea arborescens), though larvae can also be found less frequently on snowy hydrangea (Hydrangea radiata).

The leaf mine begins with a long, sometimes contorted linear portion that eventually widens into an elongate blotch or wide gallery. The frass ranges from green to black in color and is distributed in a narrow line at the start of the mine but forms a central smear in the larger, later portion of the mine. When mature and ready to pupate, the larvae cut out a 3.5–4.5 mm (0.14–0.18 in) long case from their host leaf, leaving an elliptic hole.
