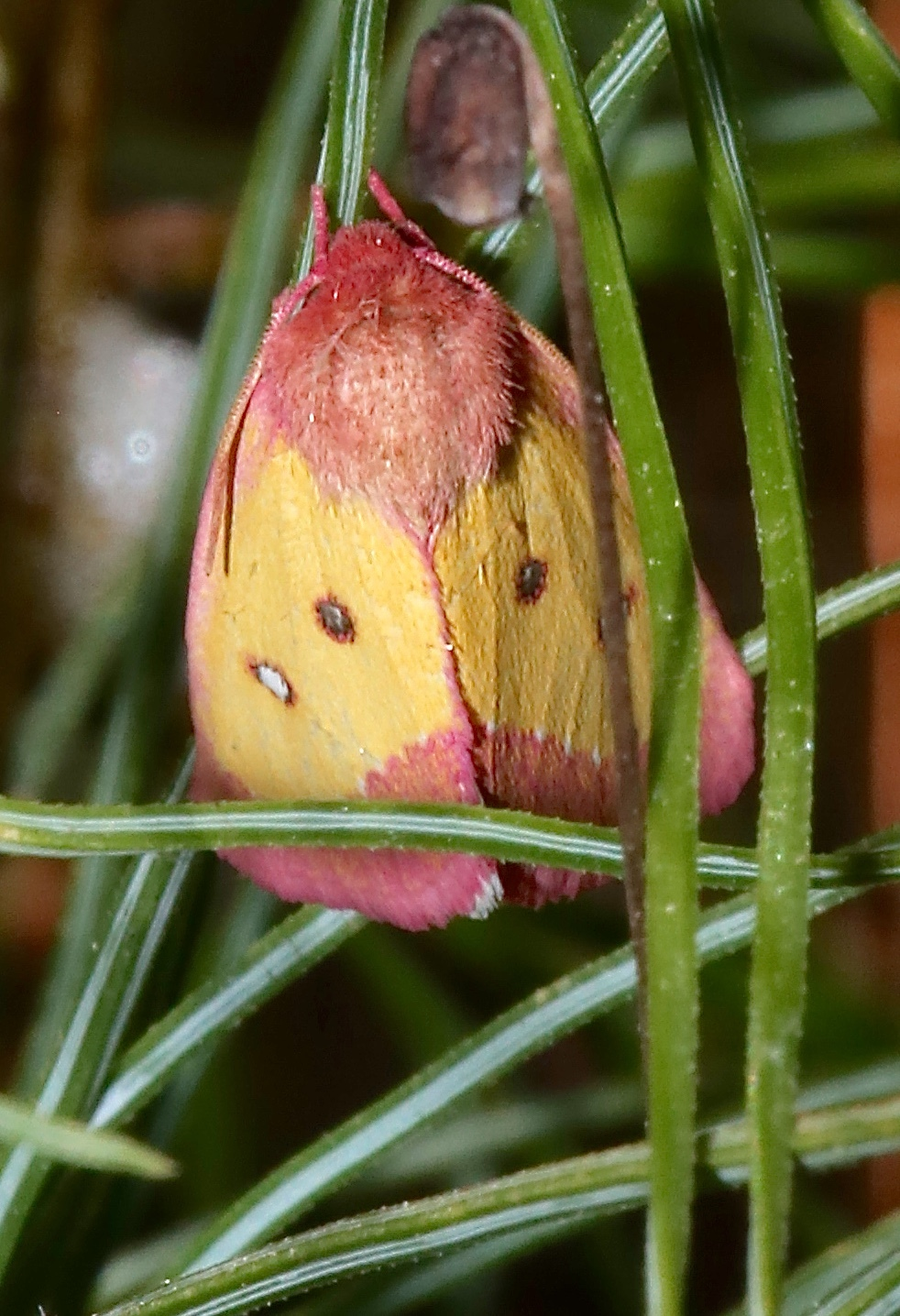
- Derrima stellata

Scientific classification
- Kingdom: Animalia
- Phylum: Arthropoda
- Class: Insecta
- Order: Lepidoptera
- Superfamily: Noctuoidea
- Family: Noctuidae
- Subfamily: Heliothinae
- Genus: Derrima; Walker, 1858

Synonyms
- Philomma Grote, 1864

= Derrima =

Genus of moths

Derrima is a genus of moths of the family Noctuidae.

== Species ==
- Derrima stellata Walker, 1858
