= Apophysis =

Apophysis may refer to:

- A tubercle (bone)
- Apophysis (spider), an outgrowth of the exoskeleton in spiders and other arachnids
- In botany, an outgrowth or enlargement of an organ such as a plant stem
- Apophysis (software), a fractal flame generating program for Microsoft Windows
- Apophysis (geology), a discordant offshoot from another body, such as a sill, dike, or pluton

== See also ==
- Apophasis
- Apophis (disambiguation)
