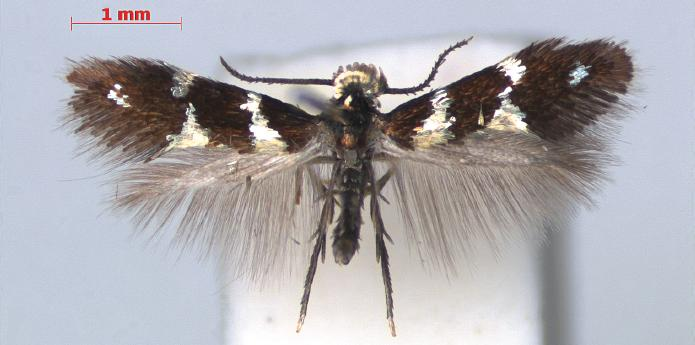
- Holotype adult male A. oinophylla
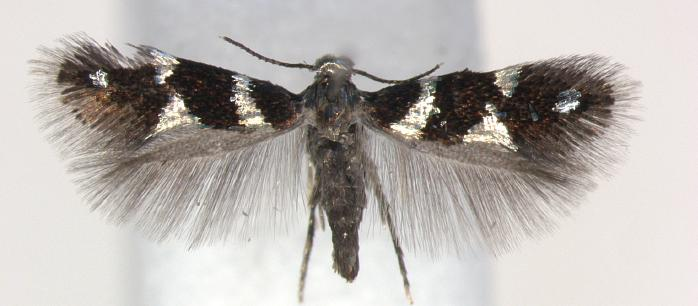
- Paratype adult female A. oinophylla

Scientific classification
- Kingdom: Animalia
- Phylum: Arthropoda
- Clade: Pancrustacea
- Class: Insecta
- Order: Lepidoptera
- Family: Heliozelidae
- Genus: Aspilanta
- Species: A. oinophylla

Binomial name
- Aspilanta oinophylla (van Nieukerken & Wagner, 2012)

Synonyms
- Antispila oinophylla van Nieukerken & Wagner, 2012

= Aspilanta oinophylla =

Species of moth

Aspilanta oinophylla is a species of moth in the family Heliozelidae. It is native to North America and is an introduced species in Italy. The larvae are leaf miners that feed on several species of Vitaceae, including commercially important species of grapevine.

== Distribution ==
In its native range, A. oinophylla can be found in Canada (Ontario and Quebec) and the United States (Connecticut, Georgia, Kentucky, Massachusetts, Minnesota, New York, North Carolina, Oklahoma, Tennessee, Vermont, and Wisconsin). It was accidentally introduced to northern Italy sometime before 2006, and has become a pest of commercial vineyards.

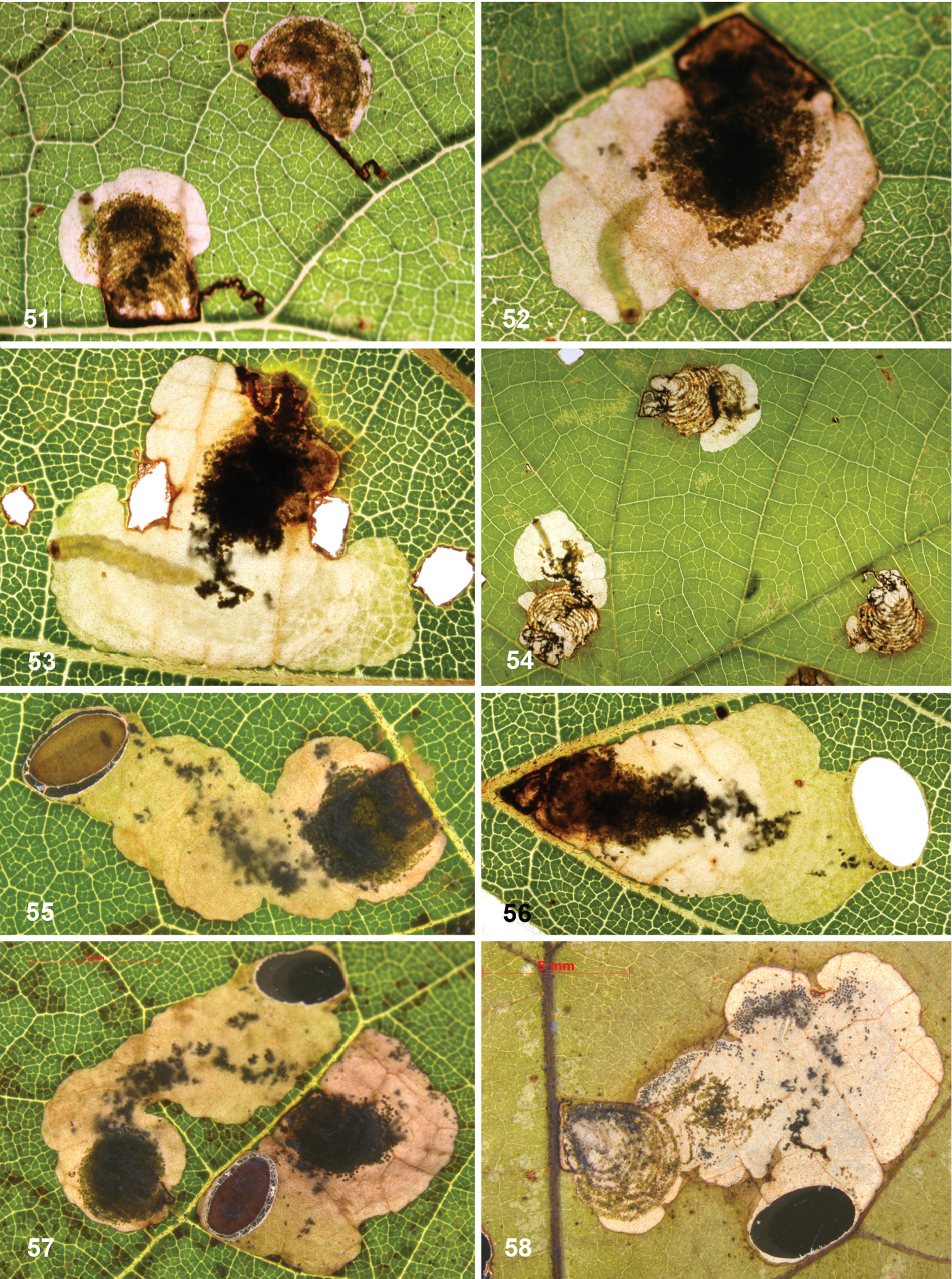
Larvae and leaf mines of A. oinophylla on Vitis leaves

== Description ==
Adult A. oinophylla have a wingspan of 4.8–6.2 mm (0.19–0.24 in), with each forewing measuring 2.3–2.8 mm (0.091–0.110 in) in length. Externally, adult A. oinophylla are visually indistinguishable from Aspilanta ampelopsifoliella – the two species can only be differentiated by examination of the genitalia.

The larvae are yellowish green with green gut contents. The head and prothorax are brown. Their host plants include Virginia creeper (Parthenocissus quinquefolia), false Virginia creeper (Parthenocissus vitacea), summer grape (Vitis aestivalis var. aestivalis and var. bicolor), fox grape (Vitis labrusca), riverbank grape (Vitis riparia), common grape (Vitis vinifera), and frost grape (Vitis vulpina).

The leaf mine begins as straight or slightly contorted linear mine going towards a leaf vein, usually turning at a right angle and following alongside the vein before turning away from it and expanding into a blotch. The earlier portion of the mine if often incorporated into the blotch. The frass of the larvae is blackish brown. In the earlier portion of the mine frass is deposited linearly, usually occupying the entire width of the mine. In the blotch portion of the mine the frass is instead deposited close to the origin of the mine. The entire mine typically occupies an area of less than 10 mm^{2} (0.016 sq in) but may be larger on particularly thin leaves. When mature and ready to pupate, the larvae cut out a 3.2–4 mm (0.13–0.16 in) long case from their host leaf, leaving an elliptic hole.
