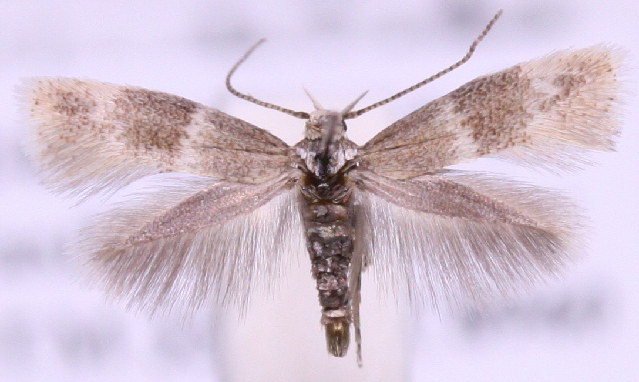

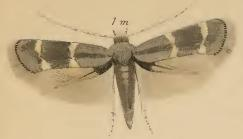

Scientific classification
- Domain: Eukaryota
- Kingdom: Animalia
- Phylum: Arthropoda
- Class: Insecta
- Order: Lepidoptera
- Family: Elachistidae
- Genus: Elachista
- Species: E. bedellella

Binomial name
- Elachista bedellella (Sircom, 1848)

Synonyms
- Microsetia bedellella Sircom, 1848

= Elachista bedellella =

Species of moth

Elachista bedellella is a moth of the family Elachistidae found in Europe.

== Description ==
The wingspan is 7–8 millimetres (0.28–0.31 in). Adults are on wing from May to June and again in August in two generations per year.

The larvae feed on various species of grasses, including Arrhenatherum elatius, Avena, Avenula pratensis, Festuca ovina, Phleum, Poa nemoralis and Poa trivialis. They mine the leaves of their host plant. Larvae can be found from September to the end of April and again (after overwintering within the mine) from June to July.

== Distribution ==
It is found from Scandinavia to the Iberian Peninsula, Italy and Bulgaria and from Great Britain to Russia.
