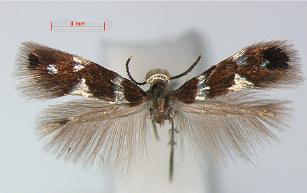
- Adult female A. ampelopsifoliella
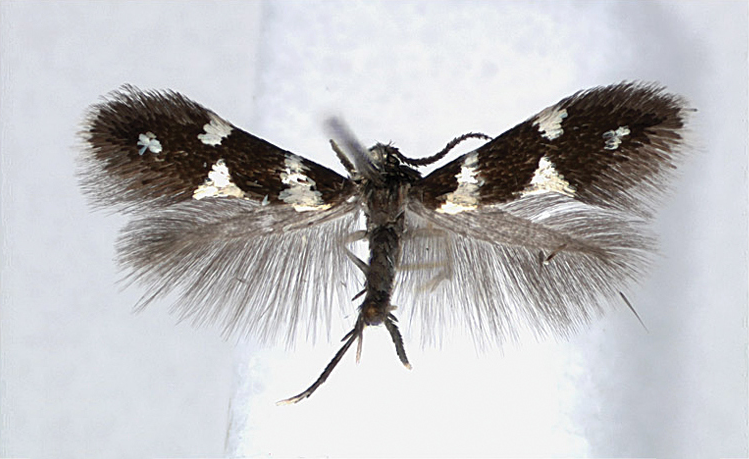
- Adult male A. ampelopsifoliella

Scientific classification
- Kingdom: Animalia
- Phylum: Arthropoda
- Clade: Pancrustacea
- Class: Insecta
- Order: Lepidoptera
- Family: Heliozelidae
- Genus: Aspilanta
- Species: A. ampelopsifoliella

Binomial name
- Aspilanta ampelopsifoliella (Chambers, 1874)

Synonyms
- Antispila ampelopsifoliella Chambers, 1874; Antispila ampelopsisella Chambers, 1874; Antispila ampelopsiella Chambers, 1874

= Aspilanta ampelopsifoliella =

Species of moth

Aspilanta ampelopsifoliella is a species of moth in the family Heliozelidae. It is found in eastern North America. The larvae are leaf miners that feed on Virginia creeper (Parthenocissus quinquefolia) and false Virginia creeper (Parthenocissus vitacea).

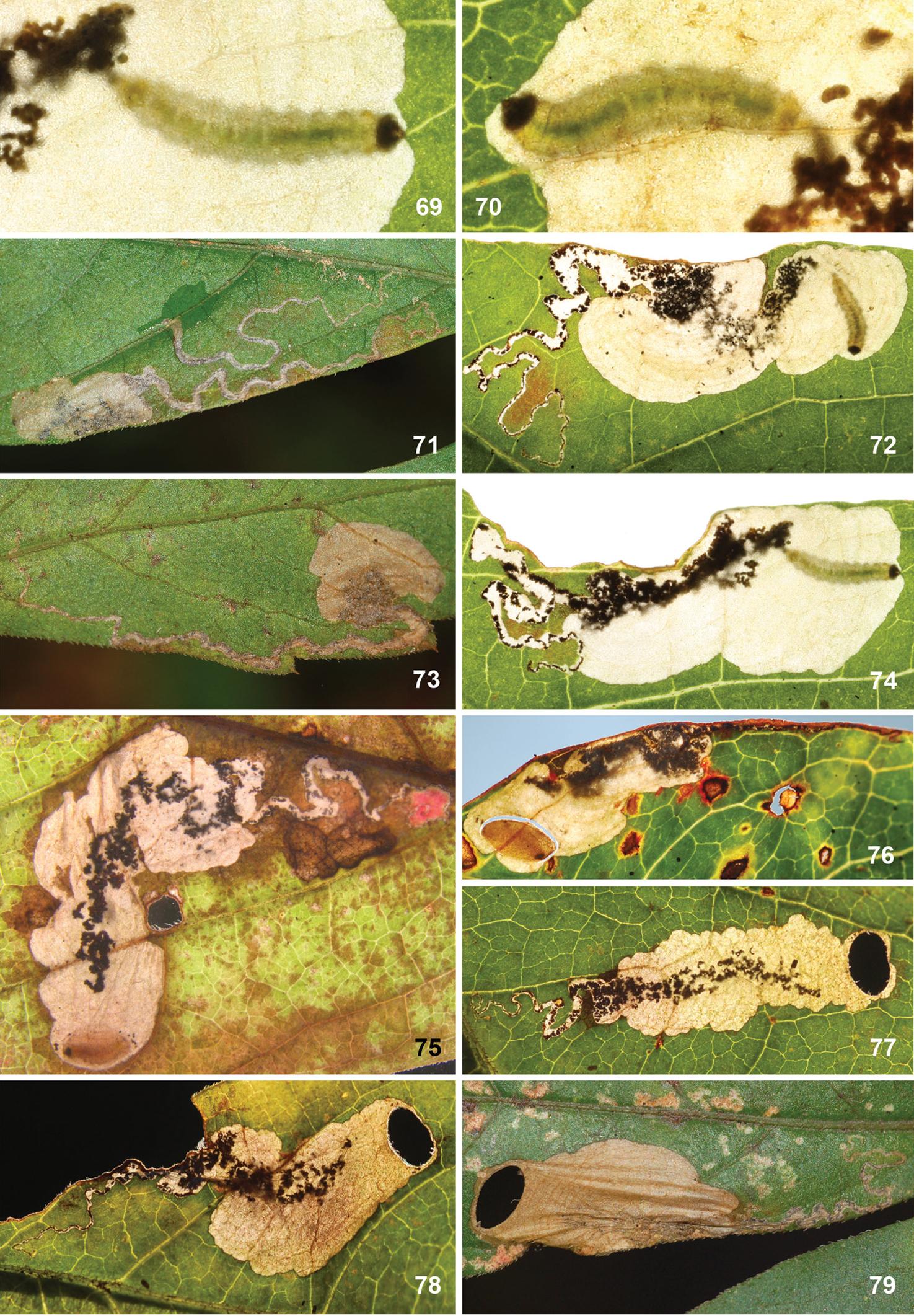
Larvae and leaf mines of A. ampelopsifoliella on Parthenocissus quinquefolia leaves

== Distribution ==
A. ampelopsifoliella can be found in Canada (Ontario) and across the eastern United States (Connecticut, Kentucky, Massachusetts, New York, Oklahoma, Rhode Island, Vermont, Wisconsin).

== Description ==
Adult A. ampelopsifoliella have a wingspan of 5–5.3 mm (0.20–0.21 in), with each forewing measuring 2.4–2.6 mm (0.094–0.102 in) in length. Externally, adult A. ampelopsifoliella are visually indistinguishable from Aspilanta oinophylla – the two species can only be differentiated by examination of the genitalia.

The larvae are mostly colourless or whitish besides the green gut contents, with a black head and prothorax.

The leaf mine begins with a long linear section, usually taking a sinuous path, that widens out into an elongate blotch. The frass of the larvae is brown to black, placed in a broken linear path near the start of the mine but becoming irregularly dispersed as the larvae mature. When mature and ready to pupate, the larvae cut out a 3.5–4 mm (0.14–0.16 in) long case from their host leaf, leaving an elliptic hole.
