= Juxta =

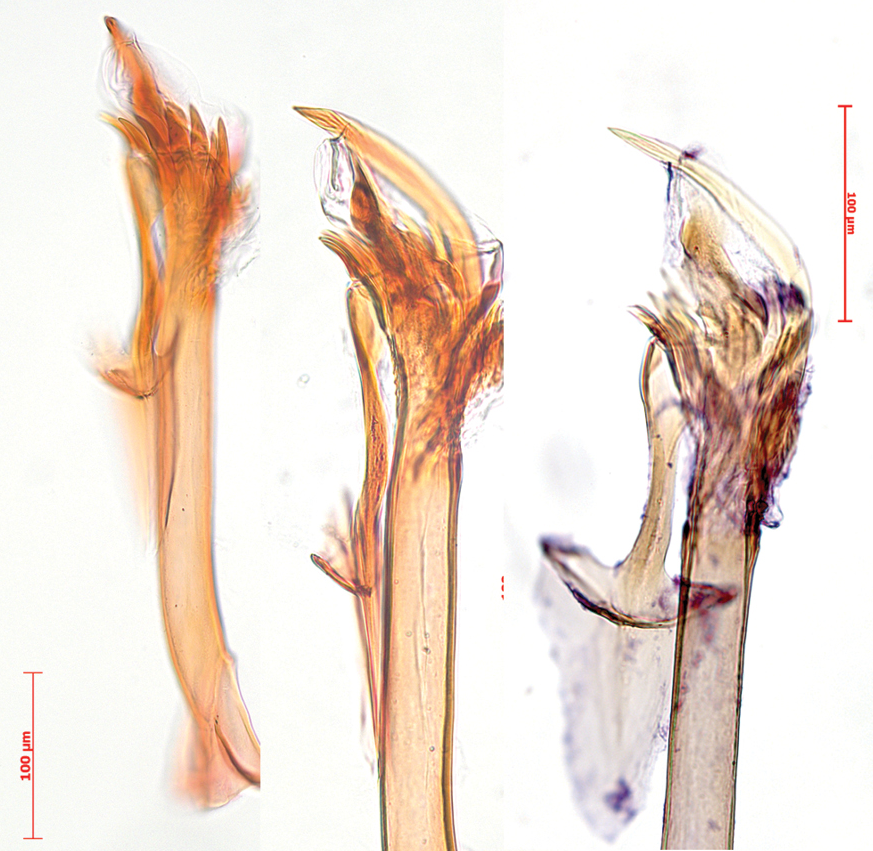
Phallus and juxta in ventro-lateral view of the moth Aspilanta oinophylla

In insect anatomy, the juxta is an organ in the male genitalia of most Lepidoptera (i.e. moths and butterflies) that ventrally supports the aedeagus (also called "phallus"), the organ used for sperm transfer in insects. The juxta is located between the two valvae. The term "juxta" has also been used to refer to a similar structure in fleshflies.

The term comes from the Latin iuxta, meaning alongside. The biological use of the term should not be confused with the more general use of juxta- as a prefix.
