= Apophis (disambiguation) =

Apophis, also known as Apep, is an Ancient Egyptian mythological deity

Apophis may also refer to:

- Apepi (pharaoh) or Apophis (reigned c. 1580–1550 BC), a 15th-Dynasty Hyksos Egyptian pharaoh
- 99942 Apophis, a near-Earth asteroid
- Apophis (Stargate), a Stargate SG-1 fictional villain

== See also ==
- 'Apepi (fl. c. 1650 BC), a Lower Egyptian ruler hypothesised to be the king's son Apophis
