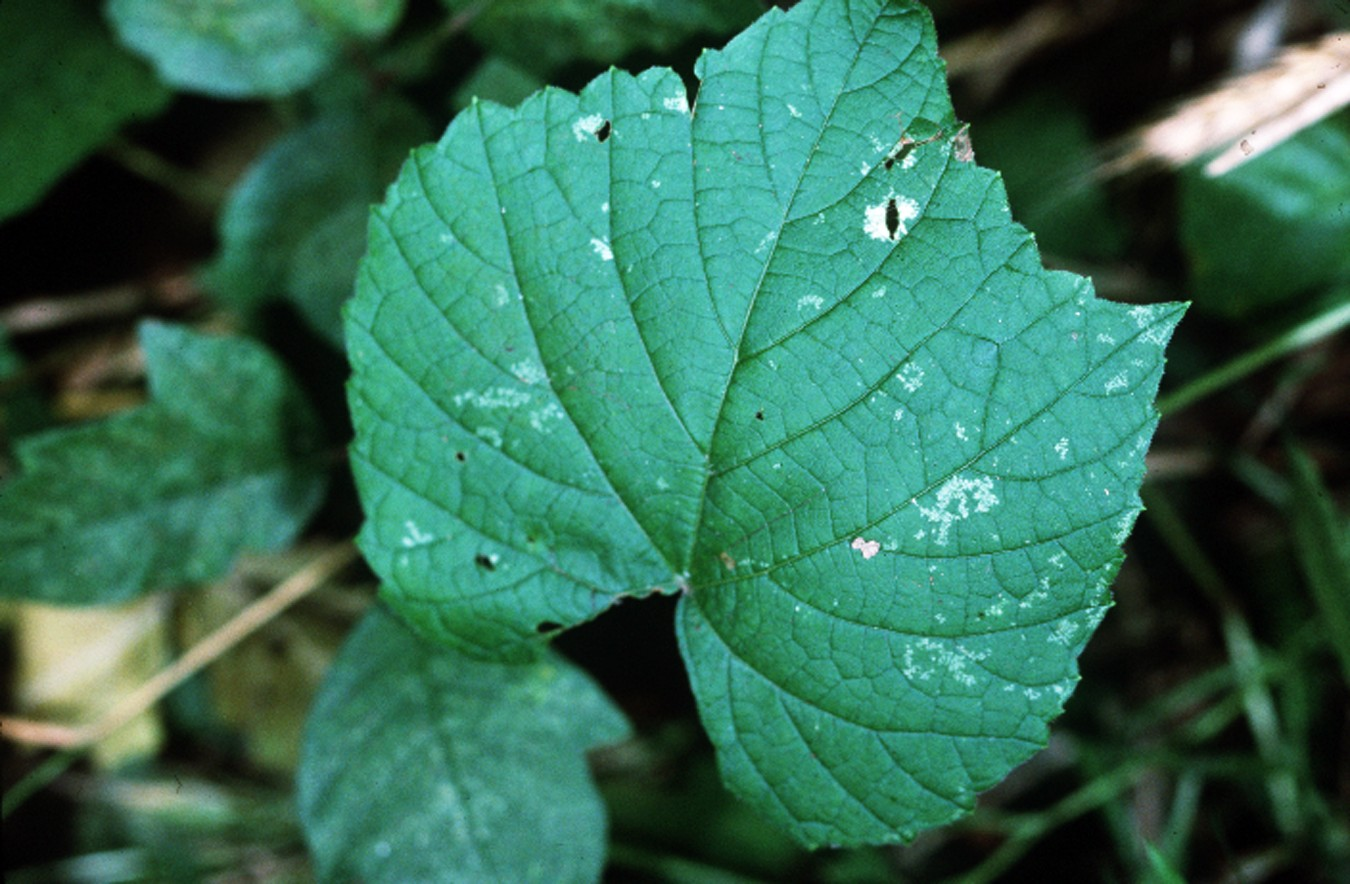

Scientific classification
- Kingdom: Plantae
- Clade: Embryophytes
- Clade: Tracheophytes
- Clade: Spermatophytes
- Clade: Angiosperms
- Clade: Eudicots
- Clade: Rosids
- Order: Vitales
- Family: Vitaceae
- Genus: Vitis
- Species: V. vulpina

Binomial name
- Vitis vulpina L.

Synonyms
- V. cordifolia Michx. V. c. var. foetida Engelm. V. c. var. sempervirens Munson; V. illex L.H.Bailey

= Vitis vulpina =

Frost grape

Species of grapevine

Vitis vulpina (with common names frost grape, winter grape, fox grape, and wild grape) is a North American species of herbaceous perennial vines in the grape family. It is widespread across most of the eastern and central United States as well as the Canadian Province of Ontario.

The genus name Vitis comes from the Latin word for "vine" and the species name vulpina comes from the Latin word for "fox-like" or belonging to a fox. It is believed that foxes were attracted to this type of grapevine, and Linnaeus used the term vulpina to differentiate these smaller wild grapes from the other American known grapes. The more common name, frost grape, refers to the fact that this otherwise acidic/tart-tasting grape becomes more desirable and sweet once it is exposed to a frost. Vitis vulpina is a high-climbing woody vine with a thick trunk and red tendrils. The grapes and the vine itself have many uses ranging from herbal remedies to edible delicacies.

== Description ==
Vitis vulpina has a relatively long lifespan with a moderate growth rate. Typically the vine will reach a maximum height of about 83 ft (25 m). Contrary to the name "Frost Grape," the plant does not do well in cold temperatures below −23 °F (−31 °C). The only benefit of the frost on the grape is further ripening of these grapes between the months of September and October. The berry (grape) is round and very tart/acidic, becoming sweet after a frost due to a drop in acid levels as the grape decomposes. Along with the ripening of the grapes in colder months, the leaves eventually fall off as the plant enters the dormant stage. Grapes tend to shrivel up on the vine, turning into raisins if not harvested before meteorological winter. The shriveled grapes are advantageous for animals looking for food during these months.

The grape vine can be either monoecious or diecious, with flowers appearing in May to June. The flowers are arranged in compound panicles with 5 yellow petals, 5 sepals and 5 stamen (floral number is 5). The leaves are arranged alternately with a cordate shape. Venation is palmate. Unlike other wild grapes there are no tufts of hair present on the leaves. Tendrils appear every third leaf oppositely, are reddish in color, and are used for growth along surfaces. The grapes are tiny and dark purple.

== Habitat ==
Vitis vulpina is most commonly found in moist or dry soils in woods, flood plains, and ravines. Due to its known ability to climb, the vine is often used along fences and trellises for ornamentation.

== Uses ==
The grapes are edible and can be used to make wine, jam, and jellies.
