= David L. Wagner =

American entomologist (born 1956)

- Born: 1956 (age 69–70)
- Education: Colorado State University; University of California, Berkeley
- Known for: Caterpillars of Eastern North America; Insect conservation biology; Research on Hepialidae (Ghost Moths)
- Awards: National Outdoor Book Award (2006)
- Scientific career
- Fields: Entomology, Ecology, Evolutionary biology
- Workplaces: University of Connecticut
- Doctoral advisor: Jerry A. Powell

David L. Wagner (born 1956) is an entomologist and a professor of ecology and evolutionary biology at the University of Connecticut. He is the author of Caterpillars of Eastern North America, widely regarded as one of the most authoritative field guides on caterpillars. He also serves as an advisor for the Connecticut Department of Environmental Protection. He is a member of the National Academies of Sciences, Engineering, and Medicine ad hoc committee on Status of Insects in North America.

== Career ==
Wagner, whose father worked for U.S. Steel, grew up "pretty much all over the place" according to Elizabeth Kolbert, because the family moved frequently during his school years. At Colorado State, where he earned a B.S. in plant science, Wagner studied with entomologist Howard Ensign Evans. At the University of California, Berkeley, he specialized in the study of ghost moths and got a Ph.D in entomology.

His lab website lists his current areas of interest as insect biosystematics and conservation biology of invertebrates, including a taxonomic interest in microlepidoptera, especially basal lineages, including Hepialidae, and leaf mining families such as Gracillariidae.

== Awards and honors ==
- 2006: National Outdoor Book Award (Nature Guidebook), Caterpillars of Eastern North America

== Works ==
- Caterpillars of Eastern North America : A Guide to Identification and Natural History. Princeton, NJ : Princeton University Press, 2005. ISBN 0-691-12143-5 (cl. : alk. paper) ISBN 0-691-12144-3 (pb. : alk. paper)

== See also ==
- "Mysteries of the Moth: More Than Meets the Eye" Xerces Society interview with David L. Wagner (October 15, 2024)
