= List of Vitales of South Africa =

Flowering plants in the order Vitales recorded from South Africa

Vitales is an order of flowering plants. In the APG III system (2009) onwards, the family Vitaceae is placed in its own order, Vitales. Molecular phylogenetic studies place the Vitales as the most basal clade in the rosids. The anthophytes are a grouping of plant taxa bearing flower-like reproductive structures. They were formerly thought to be a clade comprising plants bearing flower-like structures. The group contained the angiosperms - the extant flowering plants, such as roses and grasses - as well as the Gnetales and the extinct Bennettitales.

23,420 species of vascular plant have been recorded in South Africa, making it the sixth most species-rich country in the world and the most species-rich country on the African continent. Of these, 153 species are considered to be threatened. Nine biomes have been described in South Africa: Fynbos, Succulent Karoo, desert, Nama Karoo, grassland, savanna, Albany thickets, the Indian Ocean coastal belt, and forests.

The 2018 South African National Biodiversity Institute's National Biodiversity Assessment plant checklist lists 35,130 taxa in the phyla Anthocerotophyta (hornworts (6)), Anthophyta (flowering plants (33534)), Bryophyta (mosses (685)), Cycadophyta (cycads (42)), Lycopodiophyta (Lycophytes(45)), Marchantiophyta (liverworts (376)), Pinophyta (conifers (33)), and Pteridophyta (cryptogams (408)).

One family is represented in the literature. Listed taxa include species, subspecies, varieties, and forms as recorded, some of which have subsequently been allocated to other taxa as synonyms, in which cases the accepted taxon is appended to the listing. Multiple entries under alternative names reflect taxonomic revision over time.

== Vitaceae ==
Family: Vitaceae,

=== Ampelocissus ===
Genus Ampelocissus:

- Ampelocissus obtusata (Welw. ex Baker) Planch. indigenous
  - Ampelocissus obtusata (Welw. ex Baker) Planch. subsp. kirkiana (Planch.) Wild & R.B.Drumm. indigenous

=== Cayratia ===
Genus Cayratia:

- Cayratia gracilis (Guill. & Perr.) Suess. indigenous

=== Cissus ===
Genus Cissus:

- Cissus cactiformis Gilg, indigenous
- Cissus cornifolia (Baker) Planch. indigenous
- Cissus cussonioides Schinz, endemic
- Cissus diversilobata C.A.Sm. indigenous
- Cissus fragilis E.Mey. ex Kunth, endemic
- Cissus quadrangularis L. indigenous
  - Cissus quadrangularis L. var. quadrangularis, indigenous
- Cissus rotundifolia (Forssk.) Vahl, indigenous
  - Cissus rotundifolia (Forssk.) Vahl var. rotundifolia, indigenous

=== Cyphostemma ===
Genus Cyphostemma :

- Cyphostemma anatomicum (C.A.Sm.) Wild & R.B.Drumm. endemic
- Cyphostemma barbosae Wild & R.B.Drumm. indigenous
- Cyphostemma buchananii (Planch.) Desc. ex Wild & R.B.Drumm. indigenous
- Cyphostemma cirrhosum (Thunb.) Desc. ex Wild & R.B.Drumm. indigenous
  - Cyphostemma cirrhosum (Thunb.) Desc. ex Wild & R.B.Drumm. subsp. cirrhosum, indigenous
  - Cyphostemma cirrhosum (Thunb.) Desc. ex Wild & R.B.Drumm. subsp. transvaalense (Szyszyl.) Wild & R.B, indigenous
- Cyphostemma dasypleurum (C.A.Sm.) J.J.M.van der Merwe, endemic
- Cyphostemma flaviflorum (Sprague) Desc. indigenous
- Cyphostemma hardyi Retief, endemic
- Cyphostemma hereroense (Schinz) Desc. ex Wild & R.B.Drumm. indigenous
- Cyphostemma hispidiflorum (C.A.Sm.) J.J.M.van der Merwe, endemic
- Cyphostemma humile (N.E.Br.) Desc. ex Wild & R.B.Drumm. indigenous
  - Cyphostemma humile (N.E.Br.) Desc. ex Wild & R.B.Drumm. subsp. dolichopus (C.A.Sm.) Wild & R.B.Drumm, indigenous
  - Cyphostemma humile (N.E.Br.) Desc. ex Wild & R.B.Drumm. subsp. humile, indigenous
- Cyphostemma hypoleucum (Harv.) Desc. ex Wild & R.B.Drumm. indigenous
- Cyphostemma lanigerum (Harv.) Desc. ex Wild & R.B.Drumm. indigenous
- Cyphostemma natalitium (Szyszyl.) J.J.M.van der Merwe, endemic
- Cyphostemma oleraceum (Bolus) J.J.M.van der Merwe, endemic
- Cyphostemma paucidentatum (Klotzsch) Desc. ex Wild & R.B.Drumm. indigenous
- Cyphostemma puberulum (C.A.Sm.) Wild & R.B.Drumm. indigenous
- Cyphostemma quinatum (Dryand.) Desc. ex Wild & R.B.Drumm. indigenous
- Cyphostemma rubroglandulosum Retief & A.E.van Wyk, endemic
- Cyphostemma sandersonii (Harv.) Desc. indigenous
- Cyphostemma schlechteri (Gilg & M.Brandt) Desc. ex Wild & R.B.Drumm. indigenous
- Cyphostemma segmentatum (C.A.Sm.) J.J.M.van der Merwe, indigenous
- Cyphostemma simulans (C.A.Sm.) Wild & R.B.Drumm. indigenous
- Cyphostemma spinosopilosum (Gilg & M.Brandt) Desc. indigenous
- Cyphostemma subciliatum (Baker) Desc. ex Wild & R.B.Drumm. indigenous
- Cyphostemma sulcatum (C.A.Sm.) J.J.M.van der Merwe, endemic
- Cyphostemma woodii (Gilg & M.Brandt) Desc. indigenous

=== Rhoicissus ===
Genus Rhoicissus:

- Rhoicissus digitata (L.f.) Gilg & M.Brandt, indigenous
- Rhoicissus kougabergensis Retief & Van Jaarsv. endemic
- Rhoicissus laetans Retief, endemic
- Rhoicissus microphylla (Turcz.) Gilg & M.Brandt, endemic
- Rhoicissus revoilii Planch. indigenous
- Rhoicissus rhomboidea (E.Mey. ex Harv.) Planch. indigenous
- Rhoicissus sekhukhuniensis Retief, Siebert & A.E.van Wyk, endemic
- Rhoicissus sessilifolia Retief, endemic
- Rhoicissus tomentosa (Lam.) Wild & R.B.Drumm. indigenous
- Rhoicissus tridentata (L.f.) Wild & R.B.Drumm. indigenous
  - Rhoicissus tridentata (L.f.) Wild & R.B.Drumm. subsp. cuneifolia (Eckl. & Zeyh.) Urton, indigenous
  - Rhoicissus tridentata (L.f.) Wild & R.B.Drumm. subsp. tridentata, endemic
