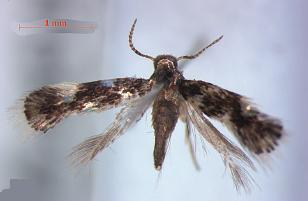
- Holocacista rivillei

Scientific classification
- Domain: Eukaryota
- Kingdom: Animalia
- Phylum: Arthropoda
- Class: Insecta
- Order: Lepidoptera
- Family: Heliozelidae
- Genus: Holocacista; Walsingham & Durrant, 1909

= Holocacista =

Genus of moths

Holocacista is a genus of moths of the family Heliozelidae. It was described by Walsingham and Durrant in 1909.

== Species ==
- Holocacista capensis van Nieukerken & Geertsema, 2015
- Holocacista micrarcha (Meyrick, 1926)
- Holocacista pariodelta (Meyrick, 1929)
- Holocacista rivillei
- Holocacista salutans (Meyrick, 1921)
- Holocacista selastis (Meyrick, 1926)
- Holocacista varii (Mey, 2011)

== Undescribed species ==
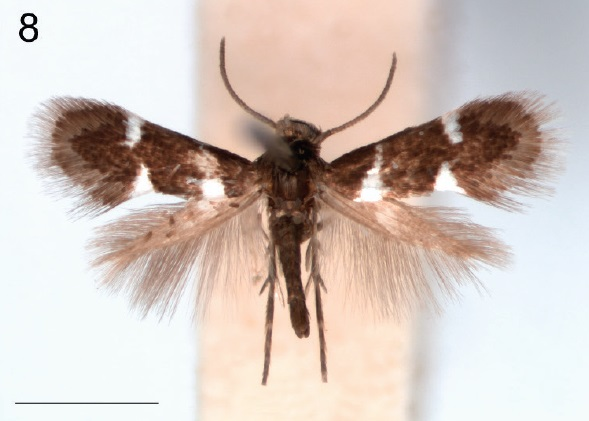
Holocacista species on Cissus integrifolia, male, Zimbabwe

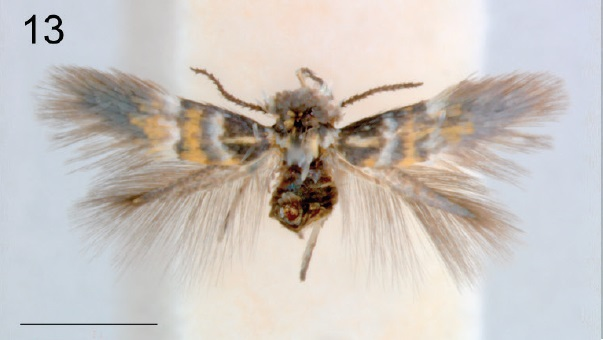
Holocacista species on Dyerophytum, male, UAE

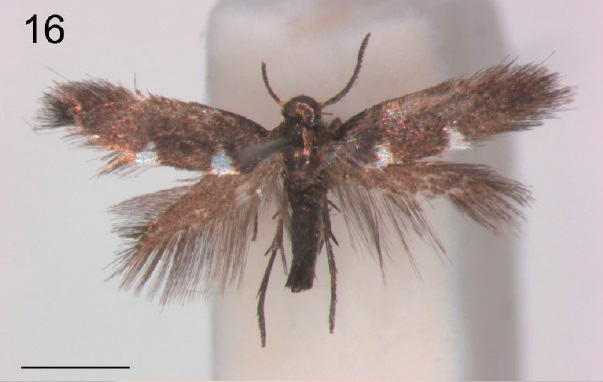
Holocacista species on Impatiens, male, Vietnam

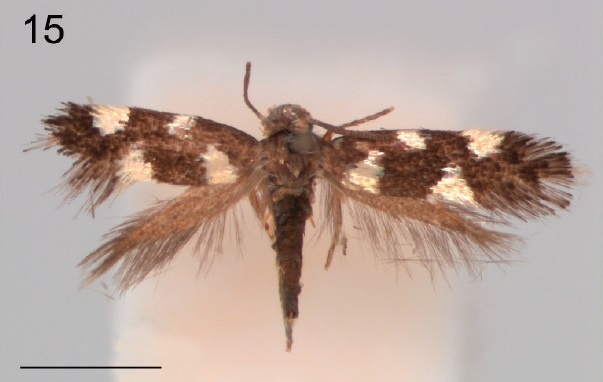
Holocacista species on Lasianthus, female, Borneo

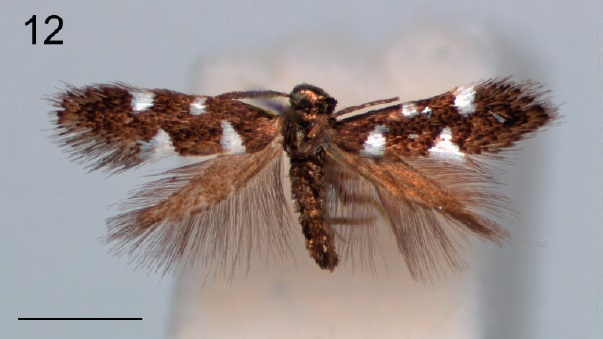
Holocacista species on Leea, male, Borneo

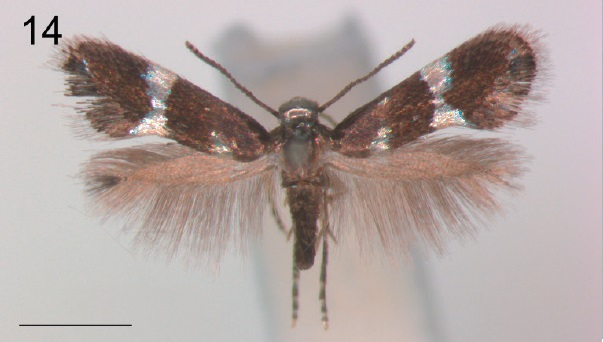
Holocacista species on Psychotria, male, Australia

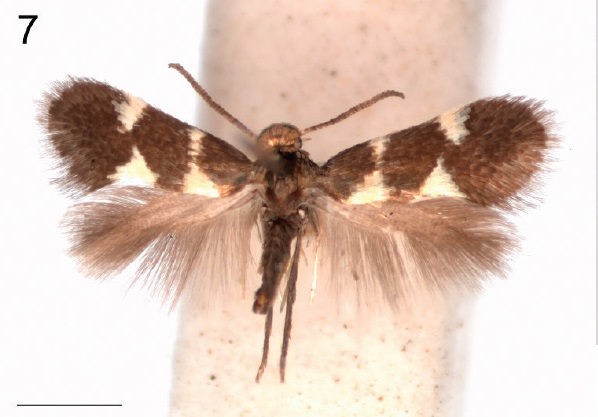
Holocacista species on Rhoicissus tridentata, male, Zimbabwe
