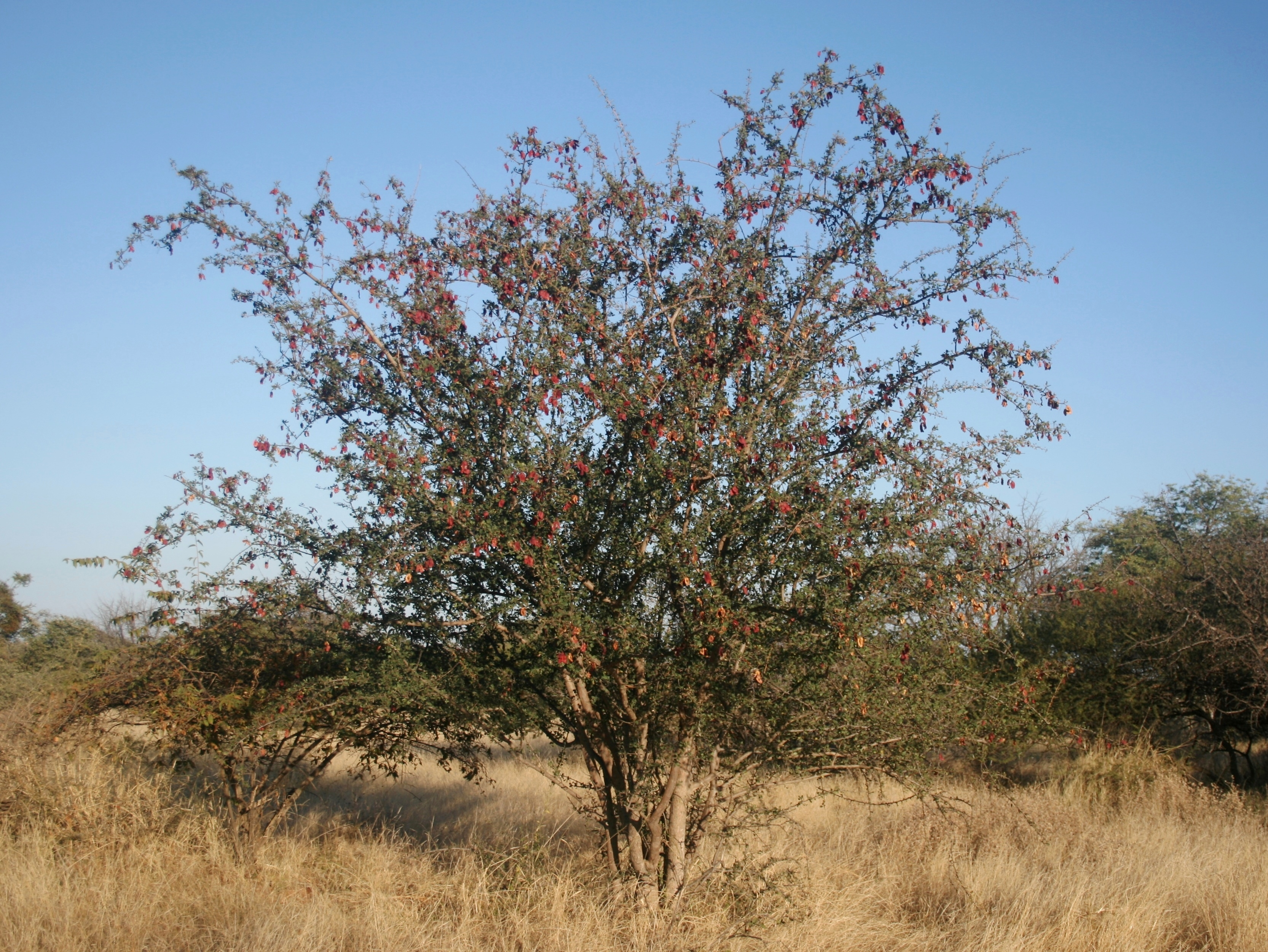

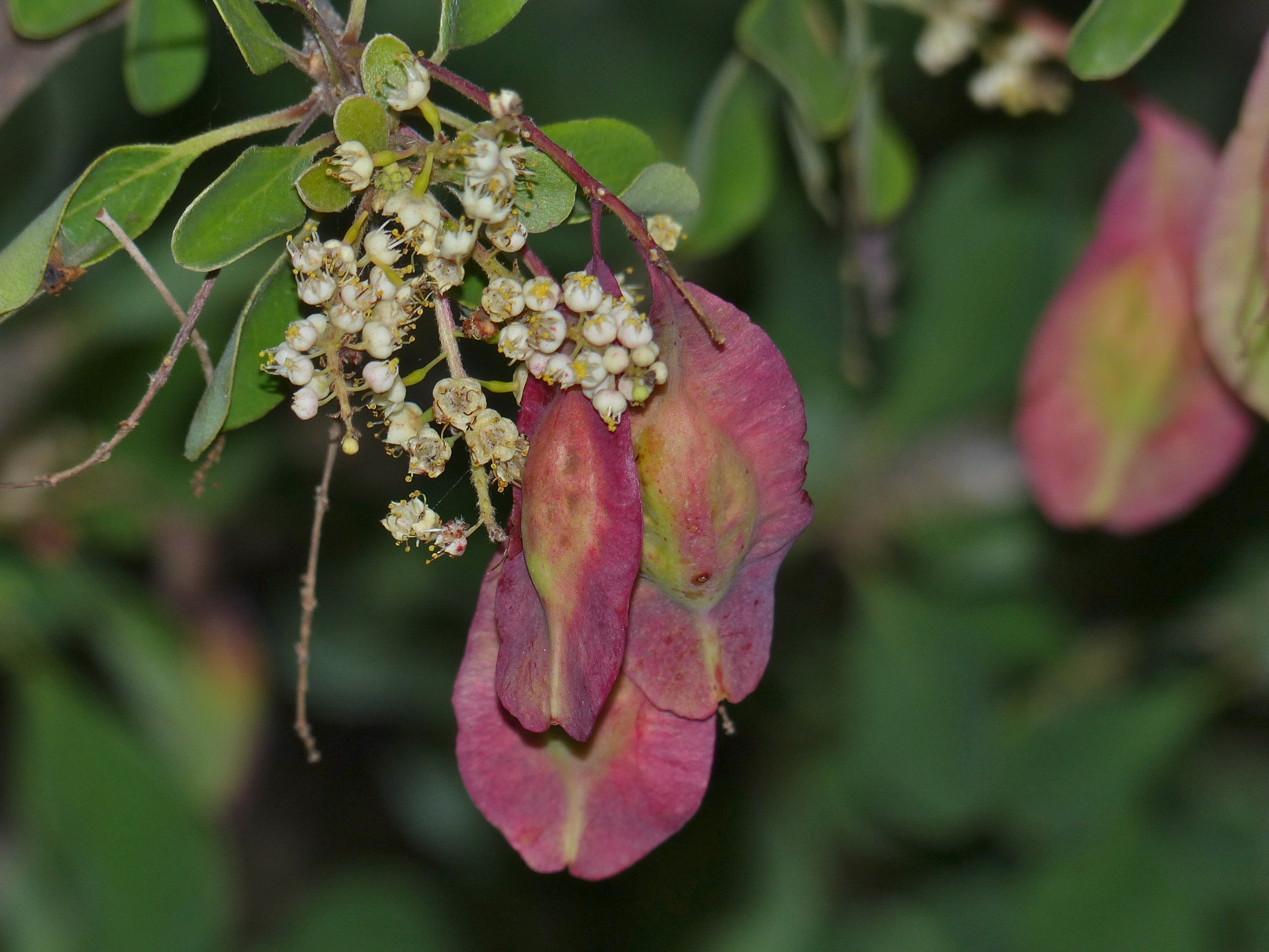
- Habit, inflorescence and fruit

Conservation status
- Least Concern (IUCN 3.1)

Scientific classification
- Kingdom: Plantae
- Clade: Tracheophytes
- Clade: Angiosperms
- Clade: Eudicots
- Clade: Rosids
- Order: Myrtales
- Family: Combretaceae
- Genus: Terminalia
- Species: T. prunioides

Binomial name
- Terminalia prunioides M.A.Lawson

Synonyms
- Terminalia benguellensis Welw. ex Hiern; Terminalia hararensis Engl.; Terminalia holstii Engl.; Terminalia petersii Engl.; Terminalia porphyrocarpa Schinz; Terminalia rautanenii Schinz; Terminalia somalensis Engl. & Diels

= Terminalia prunioides =

Purple-pod terminalia

Species of tree

Terminalia prunioides, commonly known as the purple-pod cluster-leaf, purple-pod terminalia, or in Afrikaans as sterkbos or bloedvrugboom, is a small deciduous African tree in the family Combretaceae. It is native to eastern and south-central parts of the continent, ranging from Ethiopia and Somalia in the north to South Africa in the south.

== Taxonomy and naming ==
The species was first described by the Scottish botanist Marmaduke Alexander Lawson in 1871 in the Flora of Tropical Africa. The generic name Terminalia is derived from the Latin word terminus, referring to the habit of the leaves being clustered at the ends of the shoots. The specific epithet prunioides is derived from the Latin prunus (plum) and the Greek oides (resembling), in reference to the plum-red colour of the mature fruits.

== Description ==
Terminalia prunioides is a small, multi-stemmed or single-stemmed deciduous tree that typically grows to a height of 2.5 to 15 metres (8 to 49 ft). The trunk can reach up to 40 centimetres (16 in) in diameter. The bark is pale grey to grey-black, deeply fissured, and fibrous. Long, smooth, arching branches spread outwards and downwards, and spines are occasionally present on the long branches. The short, rigid, often purplish twigs grow sharply outwards at right angles to the branches, giving the tree's silhouette a characteristically spiky appearance.

The leaves are borne in fascicles (clusters) on short, spur-like branchlets. The leaf blade (lamina) is chartaceous (papery), broadly obovate to elliptic-obovate, measuring up to 7.5 centimetres (3.0 in) long and 3 centimetres (1.2 in) wide. The apex is rounded, emarginate (notched), or mucronate (with a short, sharp point), and the base is obtuse to cuneate. Young leaves are densely covered with soft hairs (pubescent) but become almost hairless (glabrescent) as they mature. The leaves are dark green above and paler below, with 3–5 pairs of lateral veins that are somewhat impressed on the upper surface.The petiole (leaf stalk) is 0.5–2.5 centimetres (0.2–1.0 in) long.

The inflorescences are slender, lateral spikes, 5–8 centimetres (2.0–3.1 in) long, borne at the ends of short branchlets. The flowers are small, starry, and cream or white in colour, with a strong, unpleasant smell. They lack petals, but have a conspicuous puff of yellow stamens that are 3–4 millimetres (0.1–0.2 in) long. Each inflorescence contains both male and bisexual flowers, with the male flowers concentrated towards the apex.

The fruit is a distinctive, winged samara (a type of dry, indehiscent fruit) that is elliptic-oblong in outline, 4–6.5 centimetres (1.6–2.6 in) long and 2–3 centimetres (0.8–1.2 in) wide. When mature, it is a striking purplish-brown, plum-coloured, or deep red, which is the origin of its common name. The apex is obtuse, deeply emarginate, or mucronate. The single seed is contained within a hard, woody endocarp in the thickened centre of the fruit, surrounded by a tough, flat wing.

== Distribution and habitat ==
The species has a wide distribution in eastern and southern Africa. Its native range includes Angola, Botswana, Ethiopia, Kenya, Mozambique, Namibia, Somalia, South Africa (in the Northern Provinces), Tanzania, Zambia, and Zimbabwe.

It typically occurs in hot, frost-free areas at low altitudes, from sea level up to 1,400 metres (4,600 ft). It is found in a variety of habitats, including arid and semi-arid savanna and woodland, often associated with mopane (Colophospermum mopane) or Acacia and Combretum species. It also grows on stony slopes, rocky hillsides, coastal bushlands, riverine thickets, and alluvial plains.

== Ecology ==
The flowers are pollinated by insects. The tree's habit of producing leaves and flowers on short, spur-like branchlets is an adaptation to arid environments. The fruits are dispersed by wind due to their winged structure. The larvae of the shield-bearer moth Holocacista varii are leaf miners that have been recorded on T. prunioides in South Africa.

== Uses ==
=== Timber and fuel ===
The wood is yellow, hard, heavy, tough, and exceptionally durable, even in saline water where it is resistant to borers. It is traditionally used for making tool handles, fence posts, hut building, dhow keels, and wagon axles. It is also valued as a good source of firewood and for making high-quality charcoal.

=== Medicinal uses ===
The plant is used in traditional medicine across its range. In Somalia, a decoction is taken to relieve postnatal abdominal pains. The bark is chewed to treat coughs, sore throats, and stomach-aches, while the roots are chewed to treat colds. Research has shown that leaf extracts of T. prunioides possess significant antifungal activity against pathogens such as Microsporum canis, which causes ringworm and other dermatophyte infections.

=== Other uses ===
An edible gum exudes from the trunk and branches of the tree. A tea is sometimes made from the fruits and leaves. The leaves can be used as a green manure to improve soil. The rotten heartwood is occasionally pulverised and used as a fragrance for cosmetic purposes.

== Conservation ==
Terminalia prunioides has a very wide distribution and is a common species throughout much of its range. It is assessed as Least Concern on the IUCN Red List. A global conservation prediction based on extinction risk also classifies it as "not threatened".
