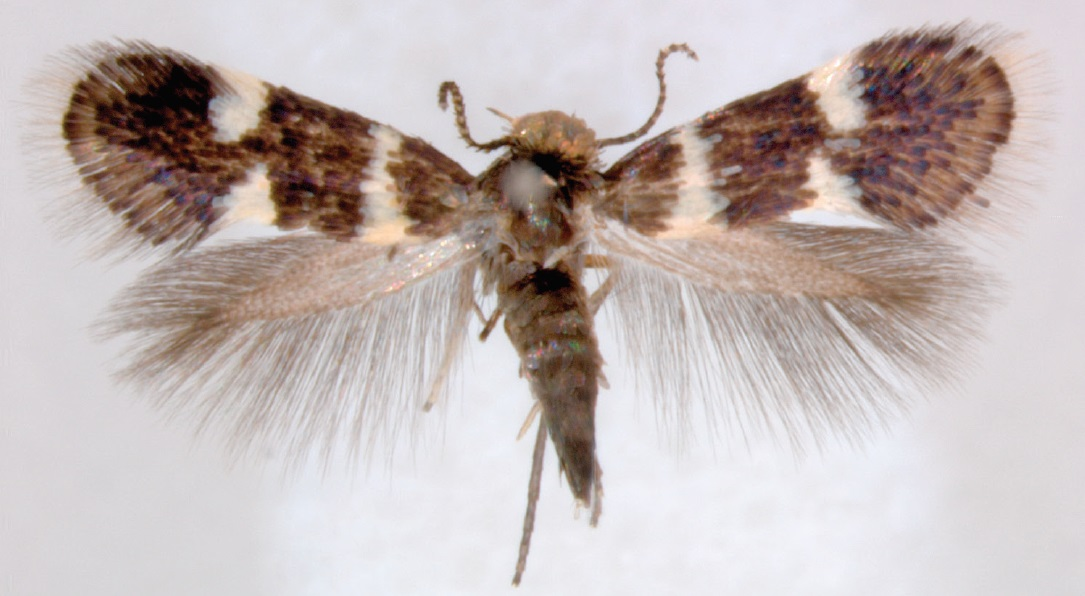
- Female
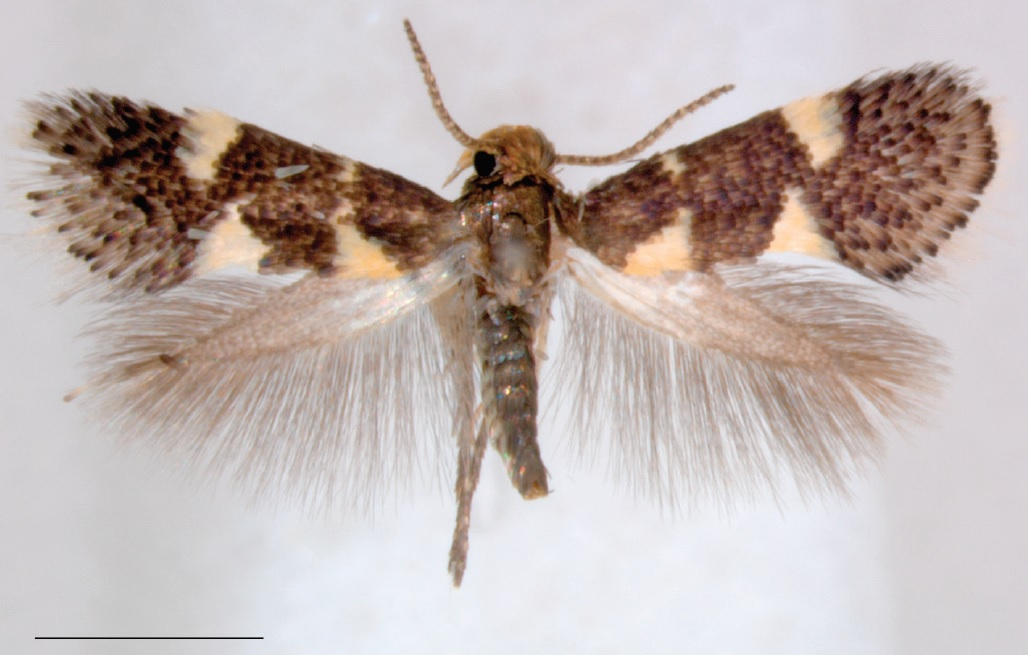
- Male

Scientific classification
- Kingdom: Animalia
- Phylum: Arthropoda
- Clade: Pancrustacea
- Class: Insecta
- Order: Lepidoptera
- Family: Heliozelidae
- Genus: Holocacista
- Species: H. capensis

Binomial name
- Holocacista capensis van Nieukerken & Geertsema, 2015

= Holocacista capensis =

Species of moth

Holocacista capensis is a moth of the family Heliozelidae. It was described by van Nieukerken and Geertsema in 2015. It is found in South Africa (Western Cape, Northern Cape and Gauteng).

The wingspan is 3.9–4.9 mm for males and 4–4.6 mm for females. The forewings of the males are grey brown, slightly irrorate, caused by scales being dark tipped and paler at the base. There is a silver-white pattern on the forewings, consisting of a triangular dorsal spot at one-fourth, usually associated with a minor spot of just a few scales at the costa, that may be joined to the dorsal spot, or even completely absent. There is a second triangular dorsal spot at 1/2, reaching almost to the middle of the wing and a triangular costal spot just beyond the middle, always separate. The females have the scales almost uniformly dark fuscous with a purplish tinge, resulting in darker, velvety wing colour and contrasting silvery-white pattern. The first costal and dorsal spots are joined to form a narrow fascia, wider at dorsum. The second dorsal and costal spots are as in males. The species is multivoltine, with adults on wing from September to early May.

The larvae feed on Rhoicissus digitata and Vitis vinifera. The larvae mine the leaves of their host plant. The majority of the mines on Vitis start at the leaf edge, but even there the egg is always near the vein in the tip of a lobe. Some mines originate close to the leaf midrib. Also, the few studied mines on Rhoicissus start at the leaf tip. The mine starts as a much contorted narrow gallery, often first in a zigzag pattern with U-turns, eventually enlarging into an irregular wide gallery or a blotch. The frass is brown in the early mine, later black, in a rather thin line in the centre of the gallery. Later, the frass is in clumps in a wider central line.

== Lifecycle ==
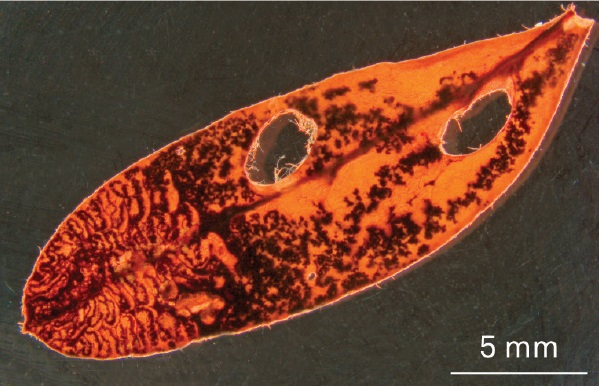
Leafmine on Rhoicissus digitata

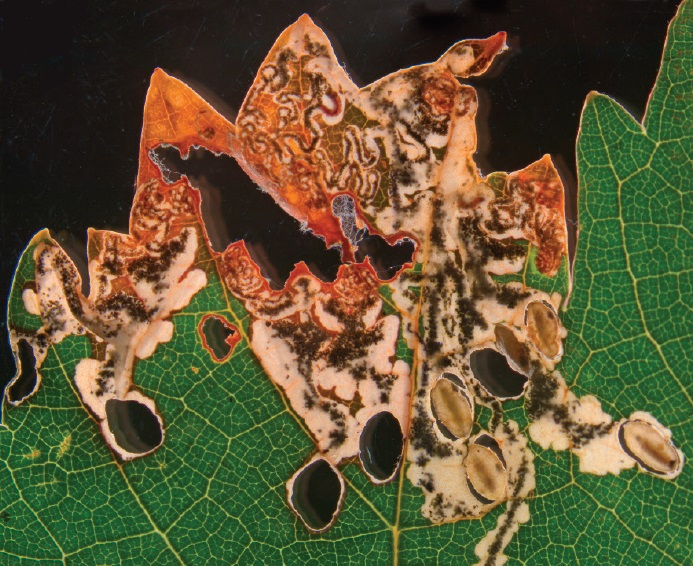
Leafmine on Vitis vinifera

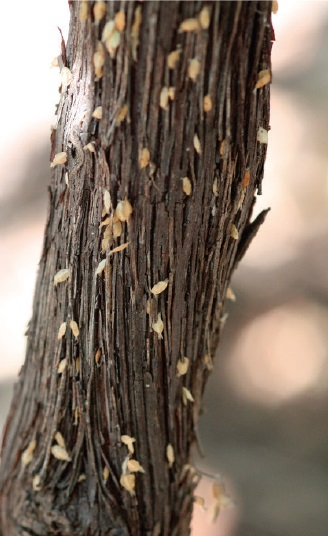
Trunk of Vitis with many cocoons with exuviae

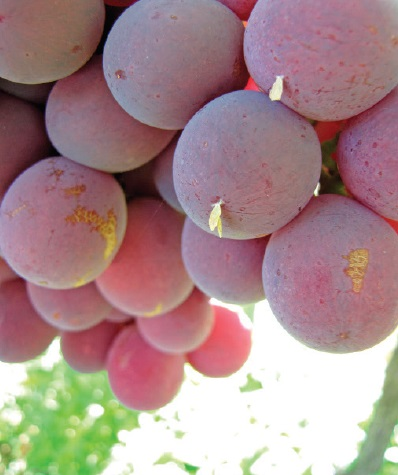
Grapes with fresh cocoons attached

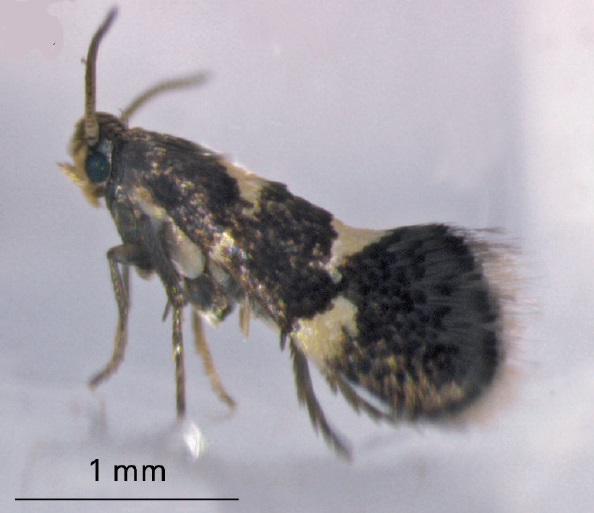
Adult male

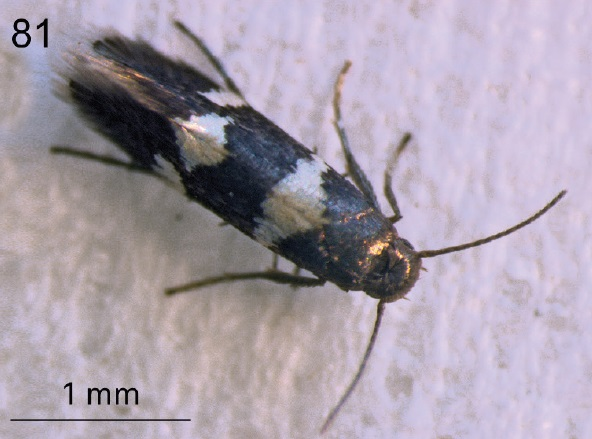
Adult male
