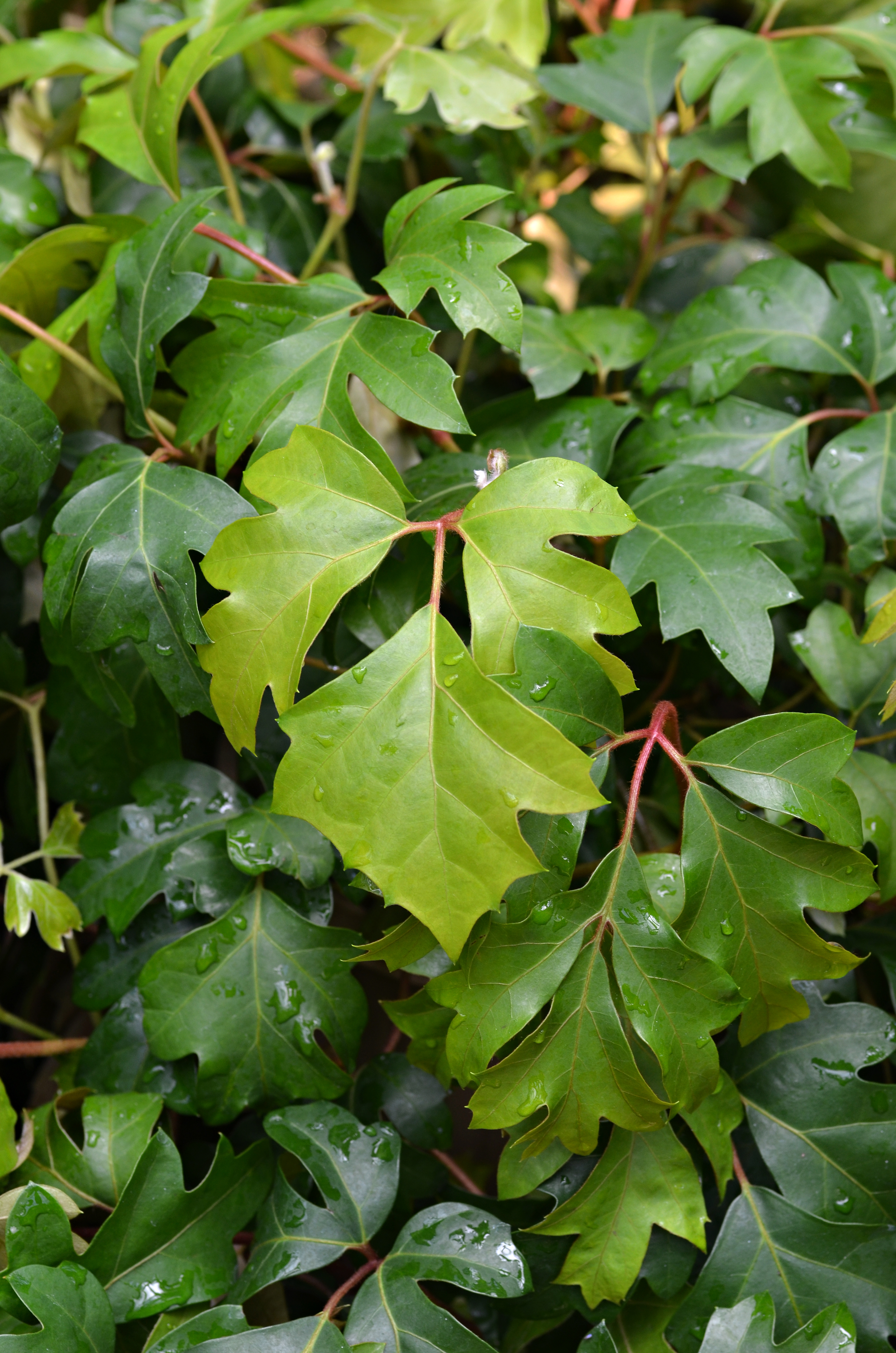
- Cissus alata leaves

Scientific classification
- Kingdom: Plantae
- Clade: Tracheophytes
- Clade: Angiosperms
- Clade: Eudicots
- Clade: Rosids
- Order: Vitales
- Family: Vitaceae
- Genus: Cissus
- Species: C. alata

Binomial name
- Cissus alata Jacq.

Synonyms
- List: Cissus pubescens Kunth; Cissus rhombifolia Vahl; Cissus sulcicaulis var. alata (Jacq.) Hassl.; Gonoloma alata (Jacq.) Raf.; Vitis alata (Jacq.) Kuntze; Vitis rhombifolia (Vahl) Baker

= Cissus alata =

Species of plant

Cissus alata, called grape ivy, grape leaf ivy, oak leaf ivy, or Venezuela treebine, is a species of flowering plant in the family Vitaceae native to the tropical Americas. Under its synonym Cissus rhombifolia, it has gained the Royal Horticultural Society's Award of Garden Merit. The species name 'alata' means winged.

== Description ==
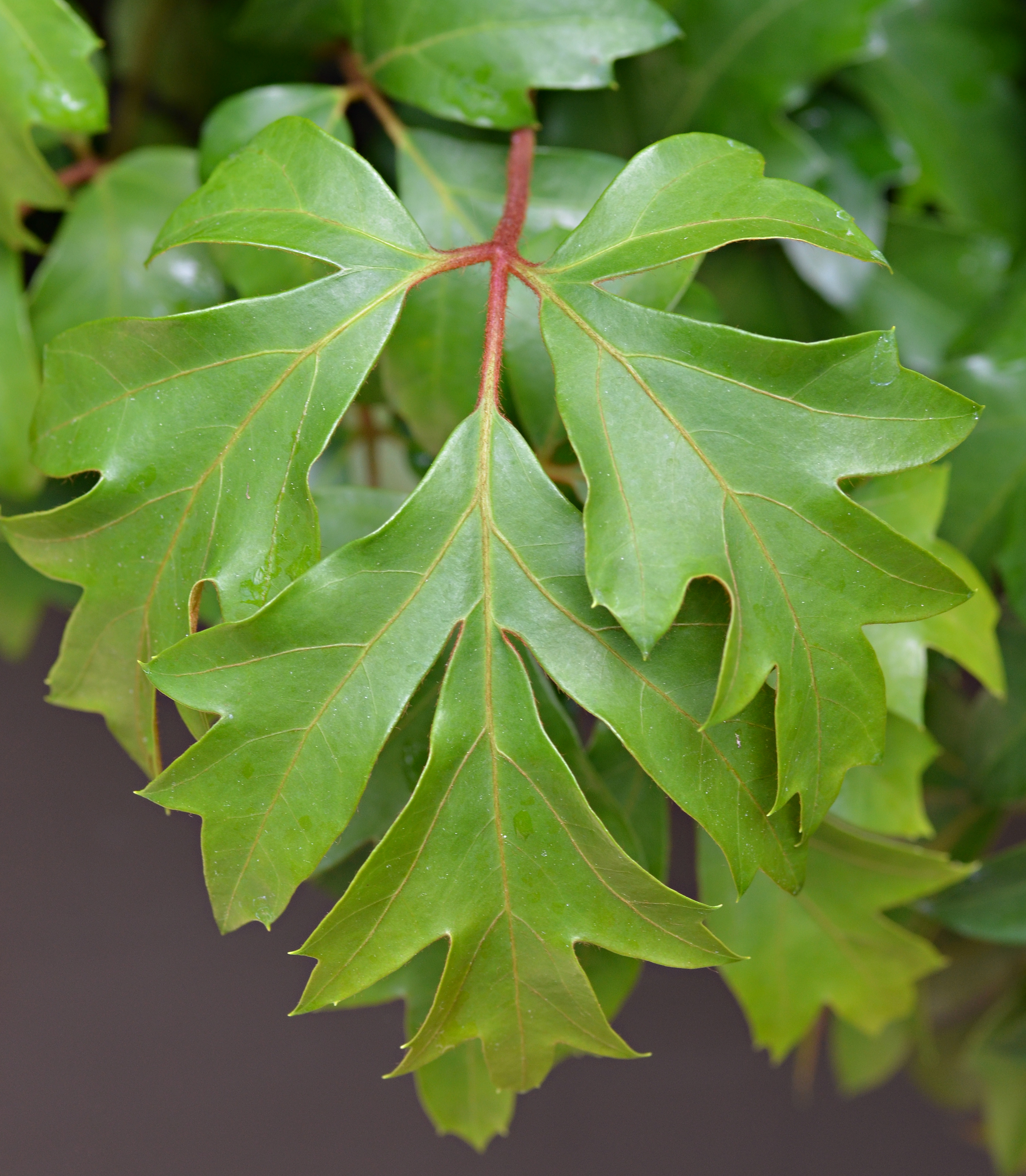
Leaf closeup

It is a 3–5 meter high vine with sulcate stems, angled to rarely winged young stems, and translucent trichomes with rusty septa. Long, simple, and hairy trichomes are sometimes mixed with glandular-tipped trichomes. The shoots branch and become woody over time. Young shoots, petioles, and undersides of leaves are covered with brown, delicate hairs.

The toothed leaves are trifoliolate, oak-shaped, dark green, and papery, with simple hairy trichomes. The undersides show nerves often flattened and forming structures similar to domatia, but without a concentration of trichomes. The leaf blades (at least adaxially) have brown to green tones when dry. Terminal leaflets are elliptic or rhombic, (2.3–) 6.8–16.5 cm long and (0.8–) 2–9 cm wide, apex acute to acuminate, base cuneate, petiole 0–20 mm long, lateral leaflets inequilateral, elliptic or ovate, apex acute or obtuse, base oblique-rounded.

Extrafloral nectaries on the stipule have been reported this species.

=== Inflorescences ===
Inflorescences 2.5–5.3 cm long, with pedicels 1.5–4 mm long, flowers cream, yellow, yellow-green or reddish; calyx cup-shaped, basally with hispidulous, rusty, short and thick trichomes mixed with glandular-tipped trichomes and apically granular, apex truncated; corolla in bud 1.5–2.5 mm long, glabrous to papillate (puberulent), apex rounded. Fruit obovoid, 7–9 mm long, purplish to black; seed 1, obovoid, 6–7 mm long.

== Distribution ==
It is native to the New World tropics, in countries such as Belize, Bolivia, Colombia, Costa Rica, Ecuador, Guatemala, Guyana, Honduras, Mexico, Nicaragua, Panama, Peru, Trinidad and Tobago, and Venezuela.

== Cultivation ==
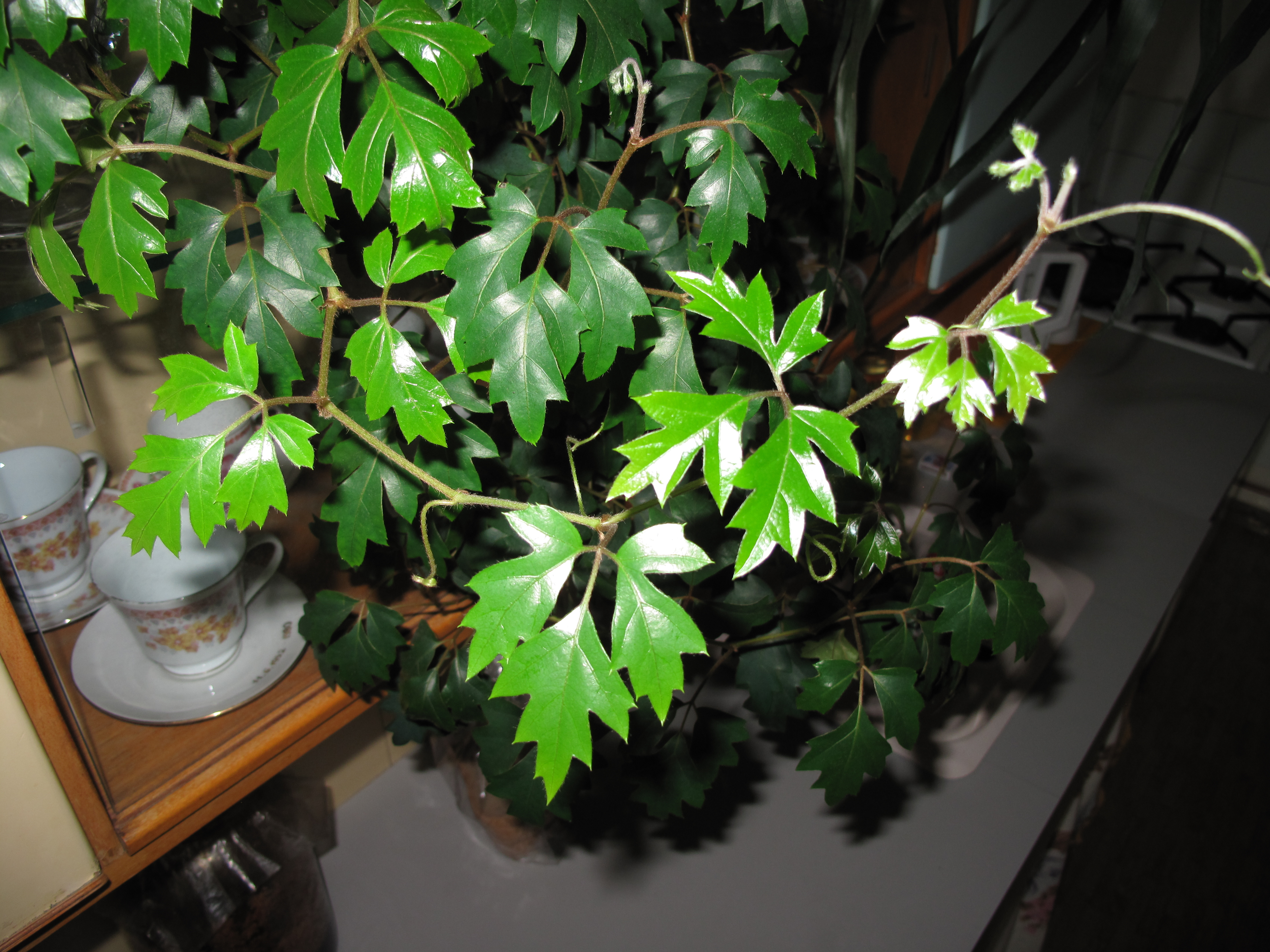
Growing indoors with tendrils showing

Relatively easy to grow, the plant prefers semi-shaded places in subtropical climates, without direct sun. The soil should be kept moist as the plant prefers moisture, although it can tolerate low humidity and heavy shade. It prefers summer temperatures between 15–24 °C, and in winter it tolerates temperatures down to 8 °C. Fertilization should be done moderately, and only in summer. It reproduces easily by top cuttings from adult shoots. As a houseplant, it usually does not bloom or bear fruit, but rather leaves and slightly hanging shoots.

The popular cultivar in cultivation is 'Ellen Danica,' which has more strongly indented, larger, and therefore more decorative leaves. It is to be distinguished from the diamond-shaped leaved Rhoicissus rhomboidea by its oak-shaped leaves, although the two species names have been misapplied for each other.

It is susceptible to pests such as leafspots, mildews, mealybugs, scales, spider mites, mites, and thrips.
