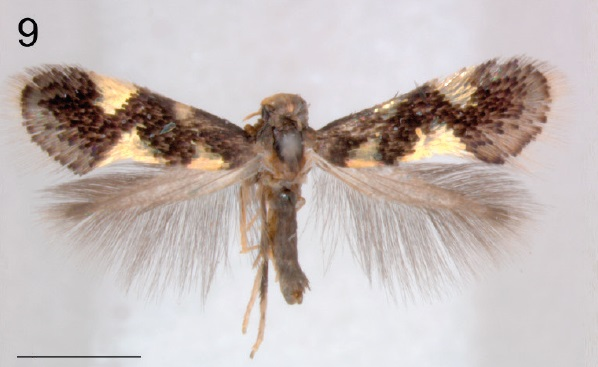

Scientific classification
- Kingdom: Animalia
- Phylum: Arthropoda
- Clade: Pancrustacea
- Class: Insecta
- Order: Lepidoptera
- Family: Heliozelidae
- Genus: Holocacista
- Species: H. rivillei

Binomial name
- Holocacista rivillei (Stainton, 1855)

Synonyms
- Alucita vitella Vallot, 1822 (Preocc); Elachista rivillei Stainton, 1855; Antispila rivillei; Antispila rivillella Rondani, 1877

= Holocacista rivillei =

Species of moth

Holocacista rivillei is a species of moth of the family Heliozelidae. It is found in southern Europe and western and Central Asia. Records include Spain, France, Italy, Malta, Slovenia, Croatia, Bulgaria, Greece, Sicily, Turkey, south-eastern Russia, Georgia, Kazakhstan, Uzbekistan and Turkmenistan.

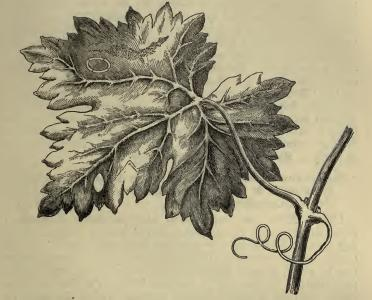
Mine

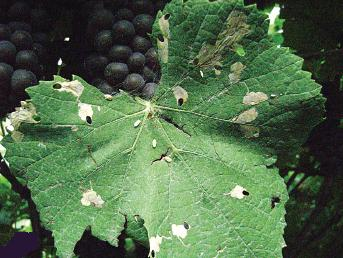
Mine

The wingspan is 3–4 millimetres (0.12–0.16 in).

The larvae feed on Vitis vinifera. They mine the leaves of their host plant. The mine starts as a relatively long, slender gallery. Later, the mine becomes a small blotch with small cut-outs. Pupation takes place in a cocoon which is often attached to the stems or leaves of the host plant.
