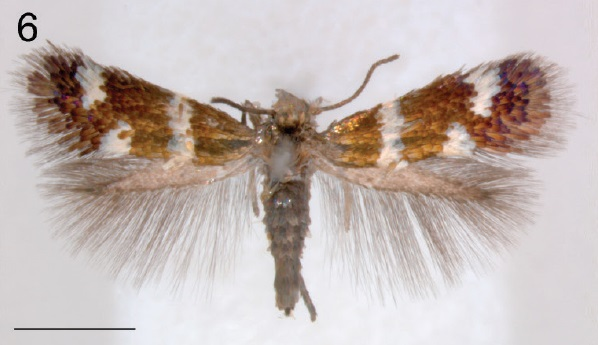
- Female
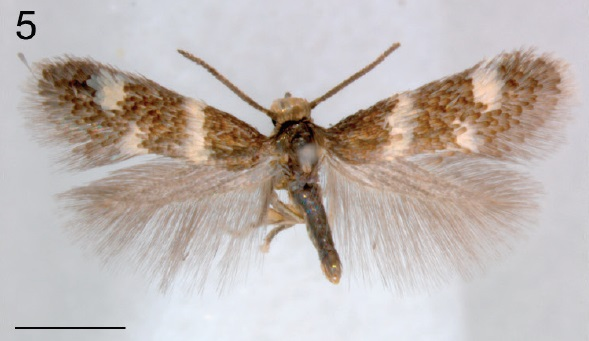
- Male

Scientific classification
- Kingdom: Animalia
- Phylum: Arthropoda
- Clade: Pancrustacea
- Class: Insecta
- Order: Lepidoptera
- Family: Heliozelidae
- Genus: Holocacista
- Species: H. varii

Binomial name
- Holocacista varii (Mey, 2011)

Synonyms
- Antispila varii Mey, 2011; Antispilina varii

= Holocacista varii =

Species of moth

Holocacista varii is a moth of the family Heliozelidae. It was described by Wolfram Mey in 2011. It is found in South Africa (Western Cape, Eastern Cape).

The wingspan is 5–5.7 mm for males and 4.5–5.6 mm for females. The forewings are grey brown with some bronze lustre and with a silver-white patterning, an oblique fascia at one-fourth, hardly narrower at the costa. There is a slightly triangular dorsal spot at one-half, not reaching the middle of the wing. There is a triangular or squarish costal spot just beyond the middle. The hindwings are pale grey. There are probably multiple overlapping generations per year.

The larvae feed on Pelargonium cucullatum, Pelargonium panduriforme, Pelargonium hispidum and Pelargonium citronellum. The larvae mine the leaves of their host plant. The mine starts towards a vein and then follows the vein as a narrow gallery, eventually rather suddenly enlarging into a more or less triangular or elongate blotch, usually after the mine makes a turn of 180°. In thin leaves the blotch can be very elongated. The frass in the early mine is a narrow black line, in the blotch the frass is typically clumped near the entrance. Mines occur either singly or with a few together on one leaf. The larva cuts out an elliptic case of about 3.4–3.7 mm long and 1.6–2.2 mm wide. The larva probably descends with its cocoon into leaf litter before pupation. Larvae are found between mid-September and April.

== Life cycle ==
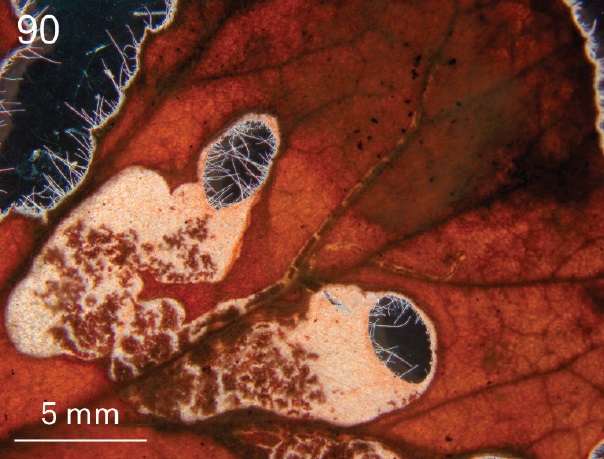
Dried mine on Pelargonium cucullatum

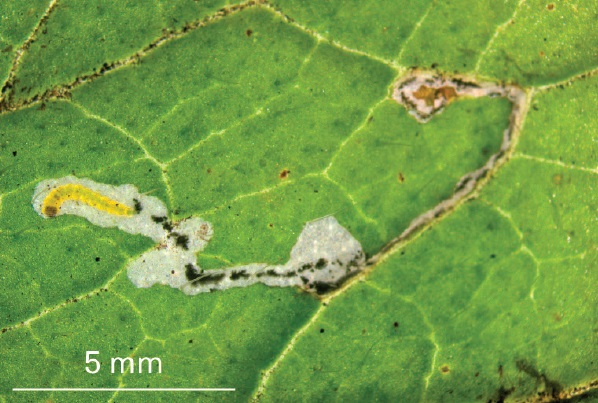
Mine with larva on Pelargonium
