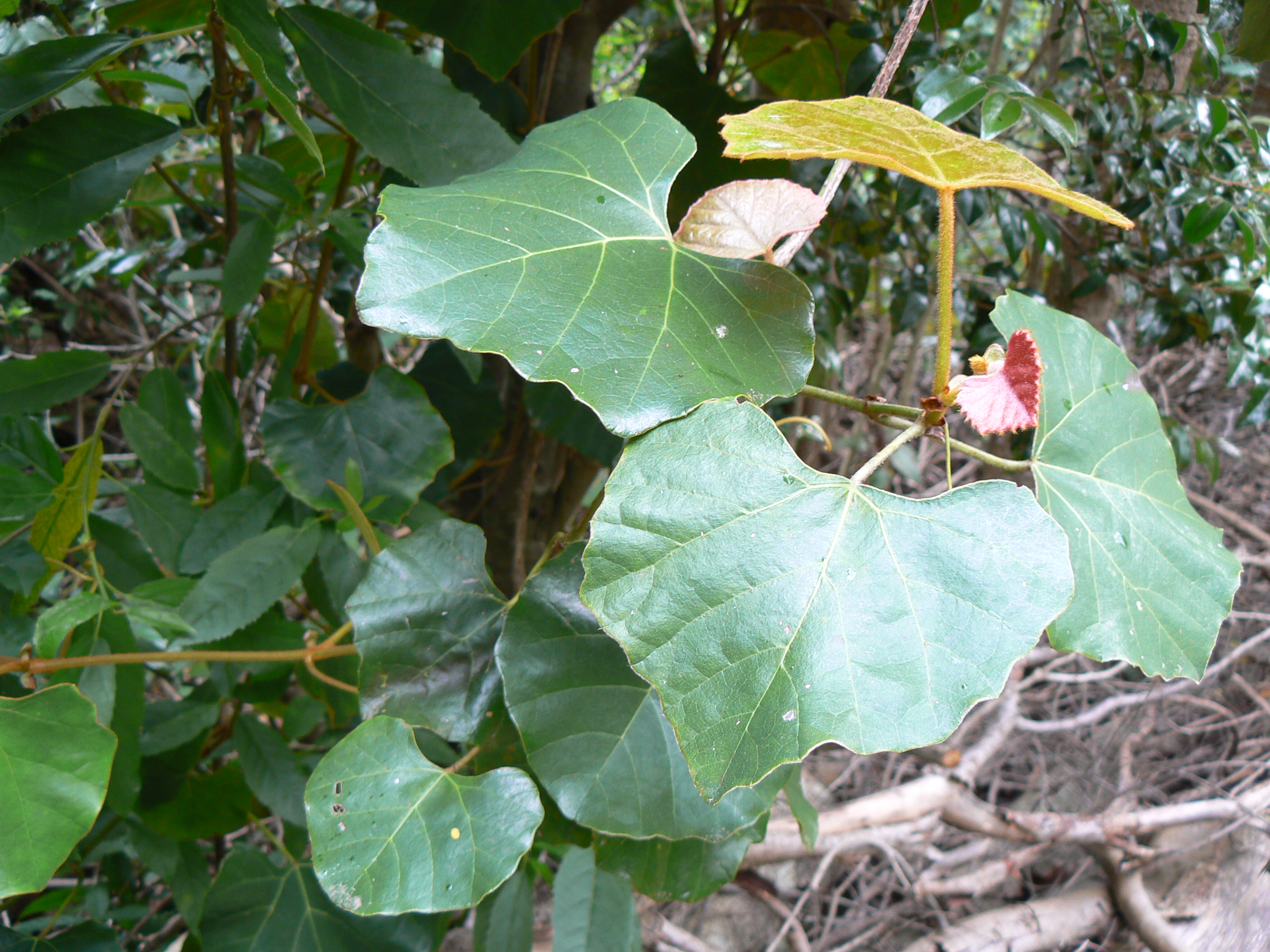
- Leaves of R. tomentosa

Scientific classification
- Kingdom: Plantae
- Clade: Tracheophytes
- Clade: Angiosperms
- Clade: Eudicots
- Clade: Rosids
- Order: Vitales
- Family: Vitaceae
- Genus: Rhoicissus
- Species: R. tomentosa

Binomial name
- Rhoicissus tomentosa (Lam.) Wild & R.B.Drumm.

Synonyms
- Rhoicissus capensis Cissus tomentosa (basionym)

= Rhoicissus tomentosa =

Cape bush grape

Species of grapevine

Rhoicissus tomentosa (or the Cape grape) is a vigorous, evergreen vine that is indigenous to the afro-montane forests of southern Africa. It is increasingly popular as an ornamental creeper in gardens, and it has a wide range of uses in traditional medicine.

== Appearance ==
A lush, dense, attractive creeper that naturally reaches up to the forest canopy and covers the tree-tops with its foliage. New velvety shoots grow upwards, reaching out with their tendrils, while old stems or lianas hang like rope from the canopy. The large, simple, roughly circular leaves are deep green above and soft and velvety below. In fact, they resemble the 3-lobed leaves of their Eurasian relative, the Grapevine (Vitis vinifera), with slightly serrated, wavy margins. The leaves start off as maroon or copper-coloured with thick velvety fur (tomentosa = "velvety"), they turn a dark rich green as they mature, and finally before they fall they become crimson.
The creeper produces clumps of furry flower-buds that open into small flowers in summer. These are followed by bunches of dark purple, edible, grape-like berries. The berries can be used as jam, but too much can be harmful.

== Distribution ==
The Cape grape can be found throughout the wetter regions of southern Africa, from the forests on the eastern slopes of Table Mountain, eastwards throughout the coastal afro-temperate forests of South Africa (Cape Provinces, KwaZulu-Natal, Northern Provinces) and then on to Zimbabwe and Malawi.

== Cultivation ==
A very attractive and easy-to-grow creeper for gardening. Its even, multi-coloured, evergreen foliage makes a good local alternative to ivy for African gardens. It can also be grown in the shade (and even indoors) as well as in the open sun. It can be used as a groundcover in shady areas; it can be planted to grow up walls like ivy (although it requires a trellis of some sort for its tendrils to hold onto); it readily climbs up and over a fence to form a screen or hedge; and it can even be used to make wire-basket topiaries.

It can easily be grown from seed, although cuttings can also be rooted.

== Gallery ==
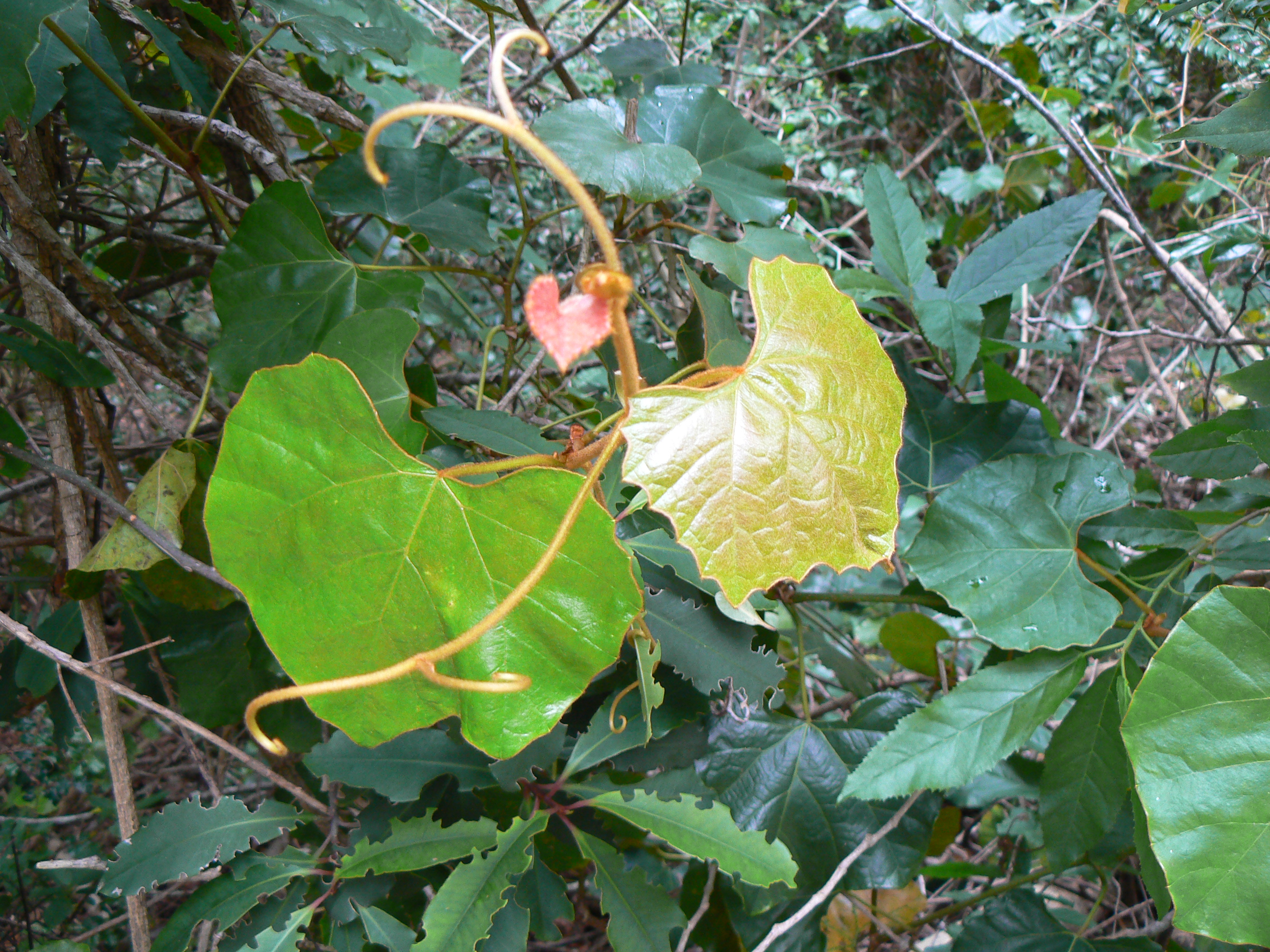
Leaf detail.

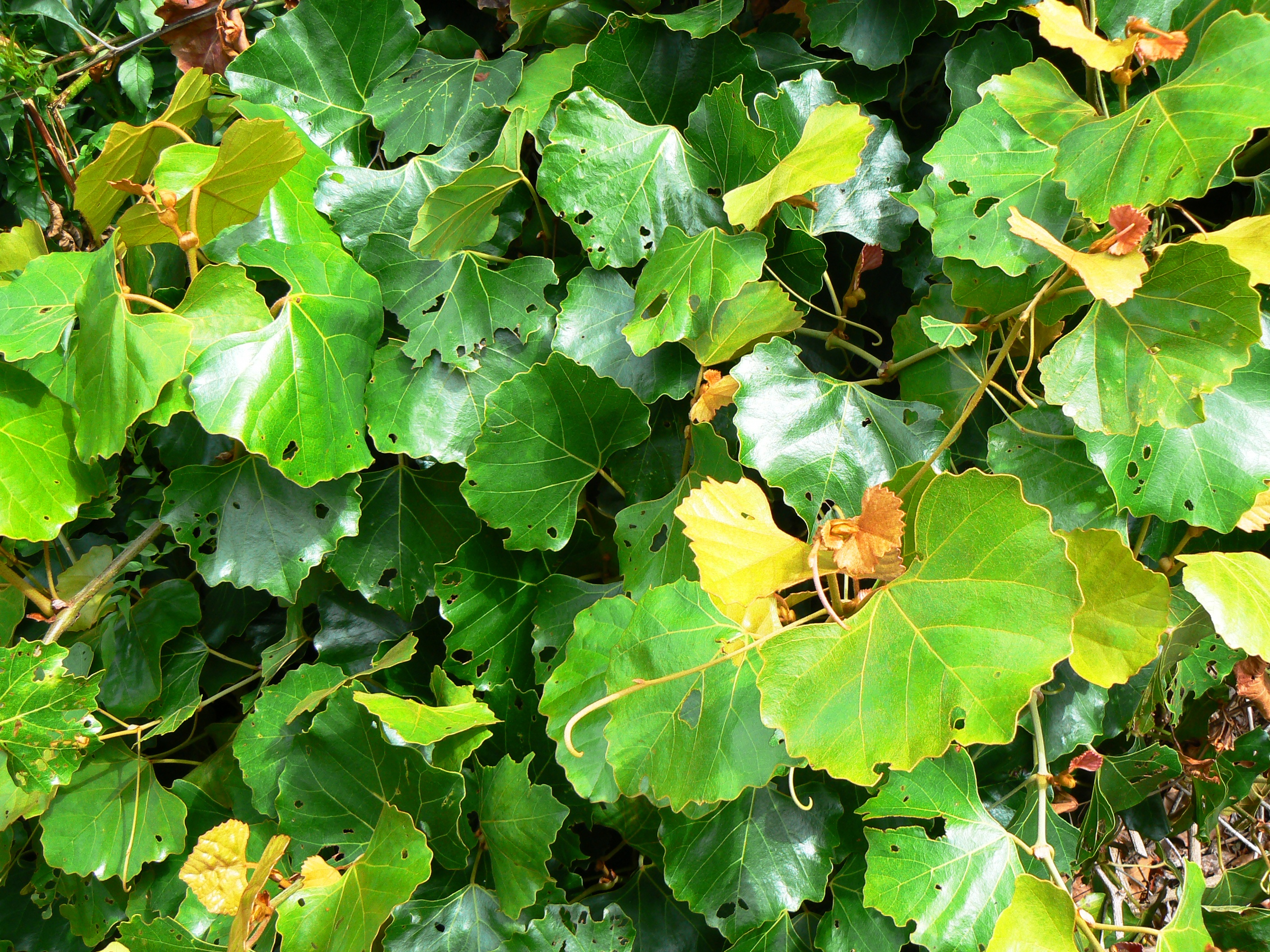
Foliage.

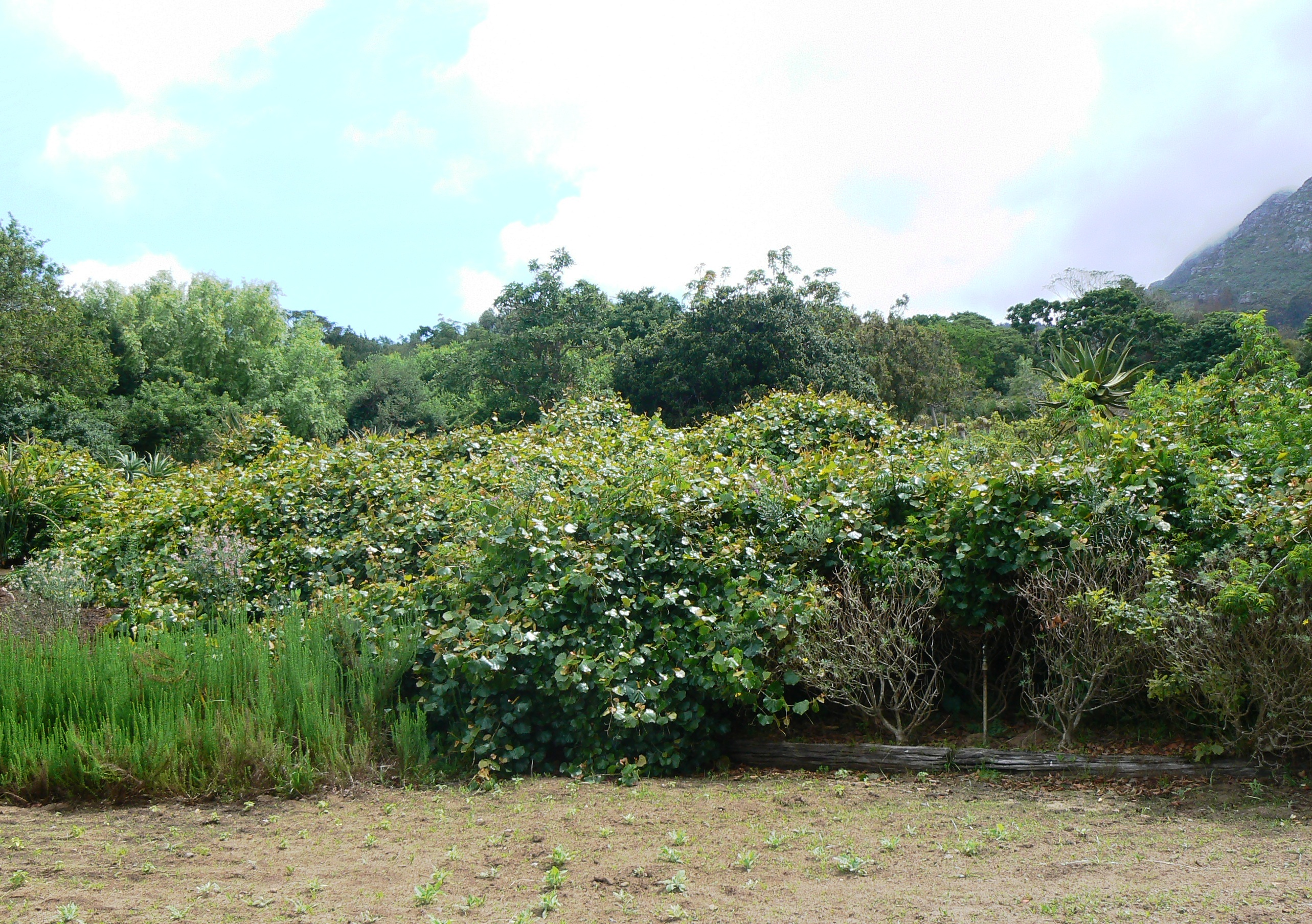
Large stand growing in the open.
