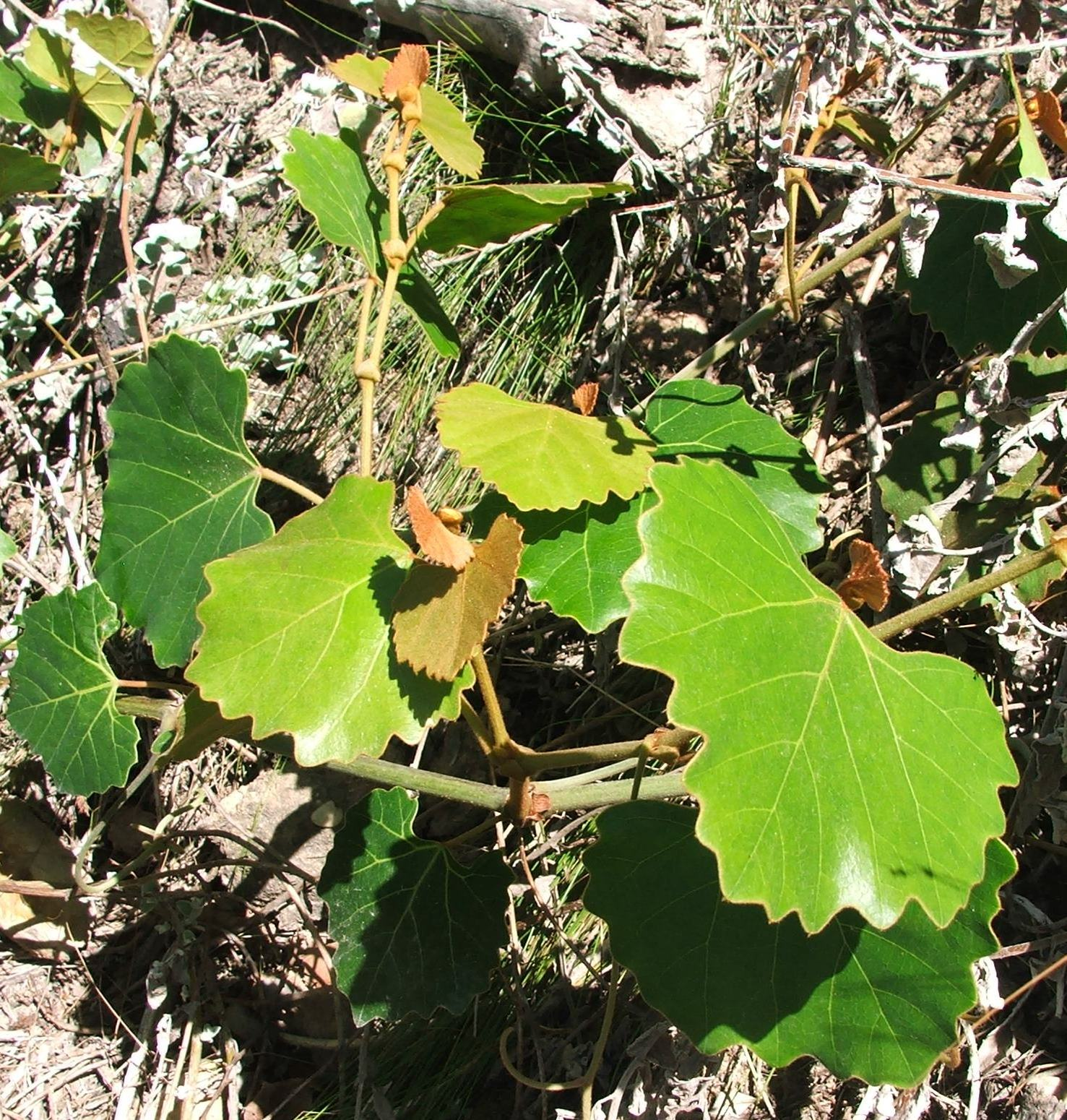
- Rhoicissus tomentosa

Scientific classification
- Kingdom: Plantae
- Clade: Tracheophytes
- Clade: Angiosperms
- Clade: Eudicots
- Clade: Rosids
- Order: Vitales
- Family: Vitaceae
- Subfamily: Vitoideae
- Genus: Rhoicissus; Planch.

Species
- See text.

= Rhoicissus =

Genus of grapevine

Rhoicissus is an Afrotropical plant genus in the grape family Vitaceae and subfamily Vitoideae. There are between nine and twenty-two accepted species.

The leaves of species R. tomentosa and R. tridentata are eaten by caterpillars of the silver striped hawkmoth (Hippotion celerio).

== Selected species ==
The genus includes the following species:
Rhoicissus digitata (L.f.) Gilg & Brandt
Rhoicissus drepanophylla Gilg
Rhoicissus edulis De Wild.
Rhoicissus holstii Engl.
Rhoicissus kougabergensis Retief & van Jaarsv.
Rhoicissus laetans Retief
Rhoicissus megalismontanus Oberm.
Rhoicissus napaeus C.A.Sm.
Rhoicissus revoilii Planch.
Rhoicissus rhomboidea (E.Mey. ex Harv.) Planch.
Rhoicissus sansibarensis Gilg
Rhoicissus schlechteri Gilg & Brandt
Rhoicissus sekhukhuniensis Retief, S.J.Siebert & A.E.van Wyk
Rhoicissus sessilifolia Retief
Rhoicissus tomentosa (Lam.) Wild & R.B.Drumm.
Rhoicissus tridentata (L.f.) Wild & R.B.Drumm.
Rhoicissus usambarensis Gilg
Rhoicissus verdickii De Wild.

Leaf variation and flower buds
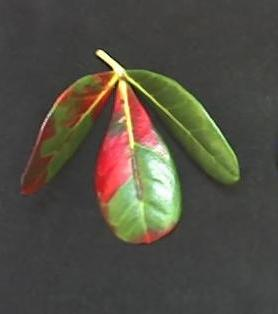
Rhoicissus digitata

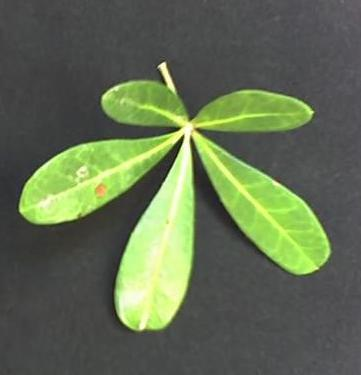
Rhoicissus digitata

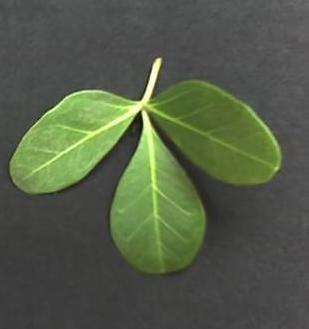
Rhoicissus revoilii

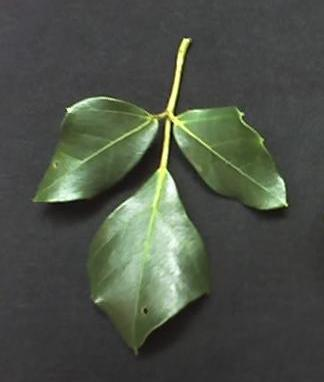
Rhoicissus rhomboidea

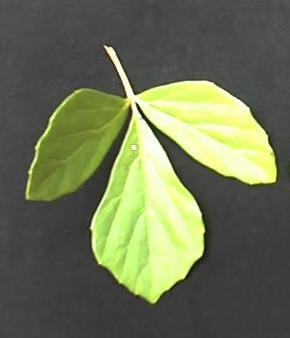
Rhoicissus tridentata

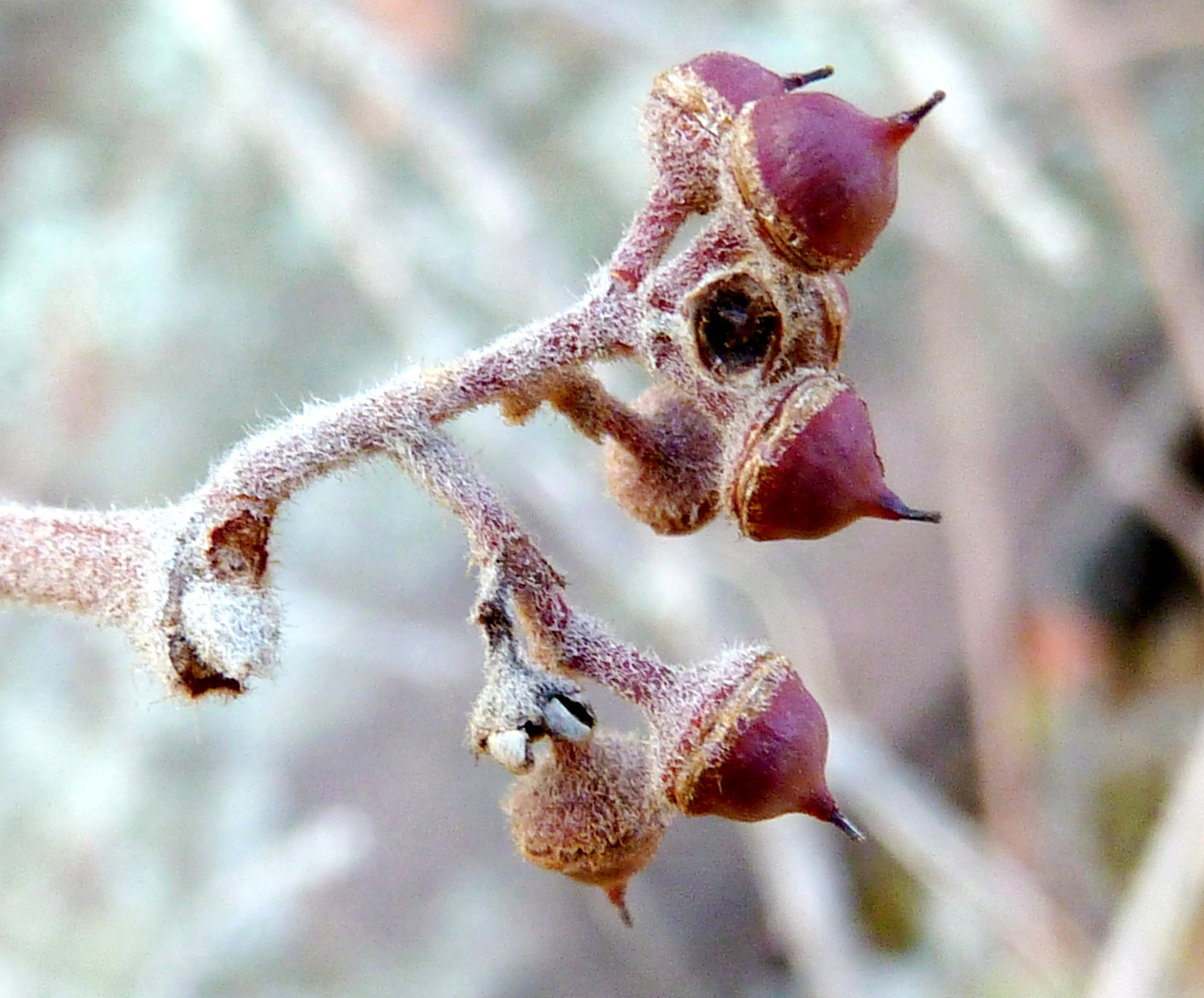
R. tridentata flower buds

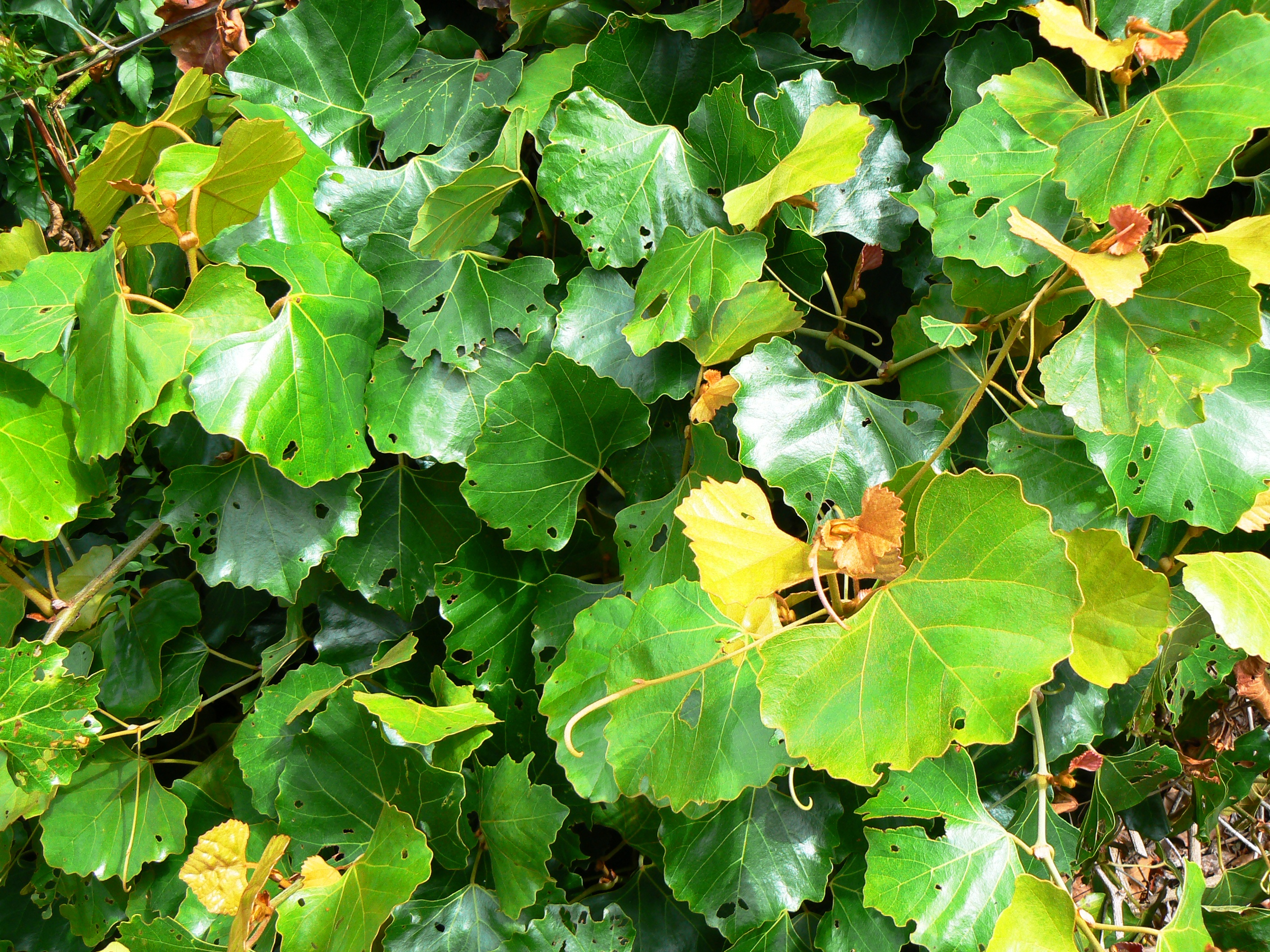
Rhoicissus tomentosa
