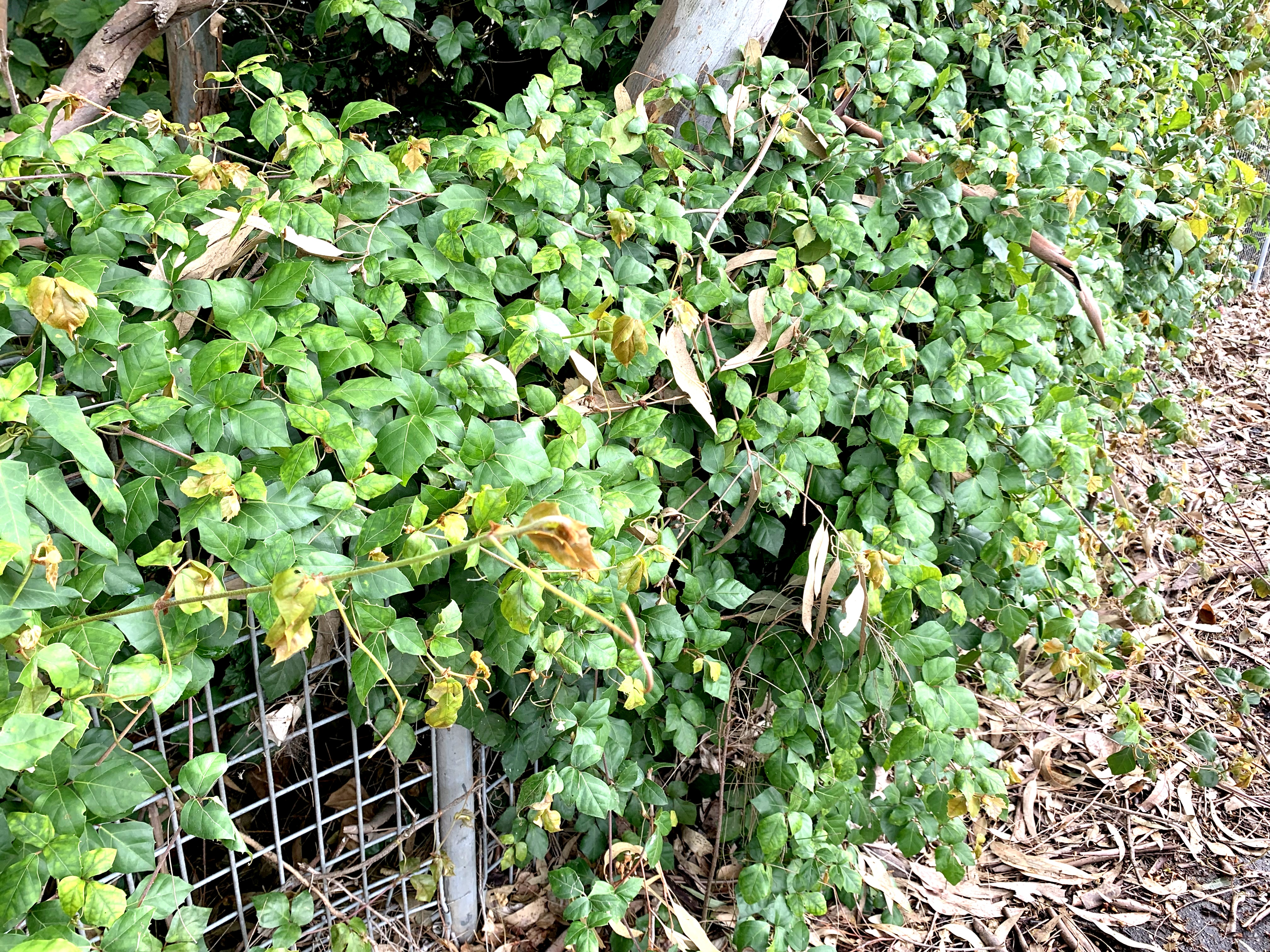
- In its habit with new leaves emerging

Scientific classification
- Kingdom: Plantae
- Clade: Tracheophytes
- Clade: Angiosperms
- Clade: Eudicots
- Clade: Rosids
- Order: Vitales
- Family: Vitaceae
- Genus: Rhoicissus
- Species: R. rhomboidea

Binomial name
- Rhoicissus rhomboidea (E.Mey ex Harv.) Planch.

Synonyms
- Vitis rhomboidea (E.Mey. ex Harv.) Szyszyl. Cissus rhomboidea E.Mey. ex Harv. (basionym)

= Rhoicissus rhomboidea =

Glossy forest grape

Species of grapevine

Rhoicissus rhomboidea, also known as the glossy forest grape, glossy wild grape, ropewood, bastard forest grape and grape ivy, is an evergreen climbing plant in the family Vitaceae that is native to the eastern forests of southern Africa.

== Taxonomy ==
It was first described in 1859 and was formerly placed within the genus Cissus. Its species name 'rhomboidea' is traced from Latin rhombus, which translates to ‘a four-sided geometrical figure with all sides and opposite angles being equal’, pertaining to its diamond-shaped leaves.

== Description ==
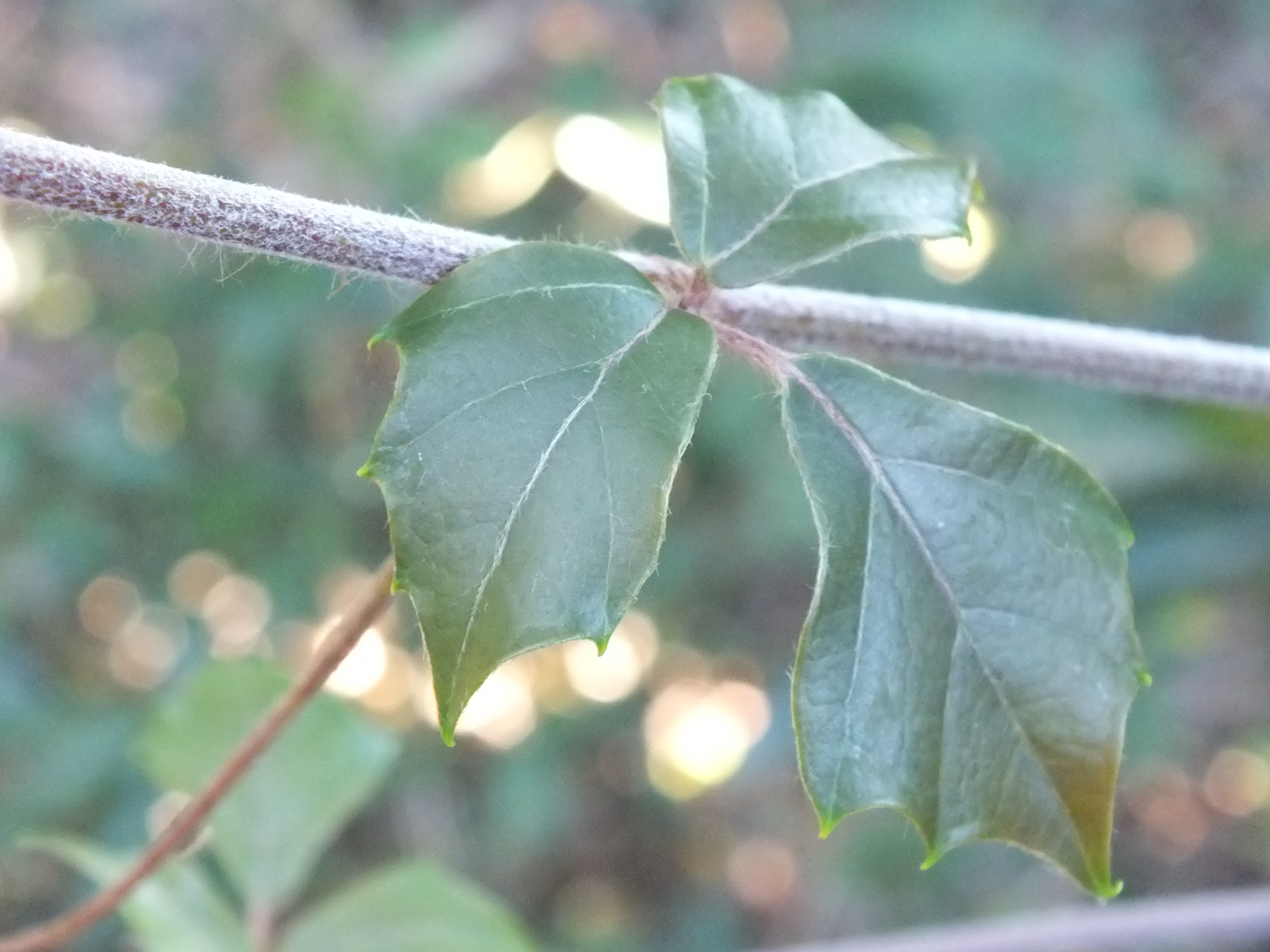
Leaf detail

It is a vigorous, evergreen vine that scrambles or becomes a liana, reaching 3 to 6 m in height (6–20 feet), though it can also grow to small tree or shrub.

The dark green, rhombic leaves are trifoliate that comprise three asymmetrical leaflets with short stalks which are coriaceous and satiny with pale russet hairs below and with an irregularly toothed margin. Each tooth is tipped with a roughly 1 mm long point, and the leaflet tip decreases to a degree.

The dark brown-coloured stem has many branches, with very powerful, forked tendrils. Younger parts of plant are covered in soft rust-coloured hairs.

=== Inflorescences ===
Flowers are greenish yellow, inconspicuous and small, in divided heads in the leaf axils, which appear in spring to midsummer. Their fleshy, showy, spherical, edible grape-like fruits (drupes) are borne in clumps from late summer to autumn, which may continue to late spring, where they ripen to a dark red, purple or black.

== Distribution ==
The vine is native to South Africa, Eswatini, Swaziland, Mozambique and Zimbabwe. In South Africa it is found in the provinces of the Eastern Cape, KwaZulu-Natal, Mpumalanga and Limpopo, usually in forest and forest edges. It is well adaptable in tropical and warm temperate or subtropical climate zones.

== Uses and cultivation ==
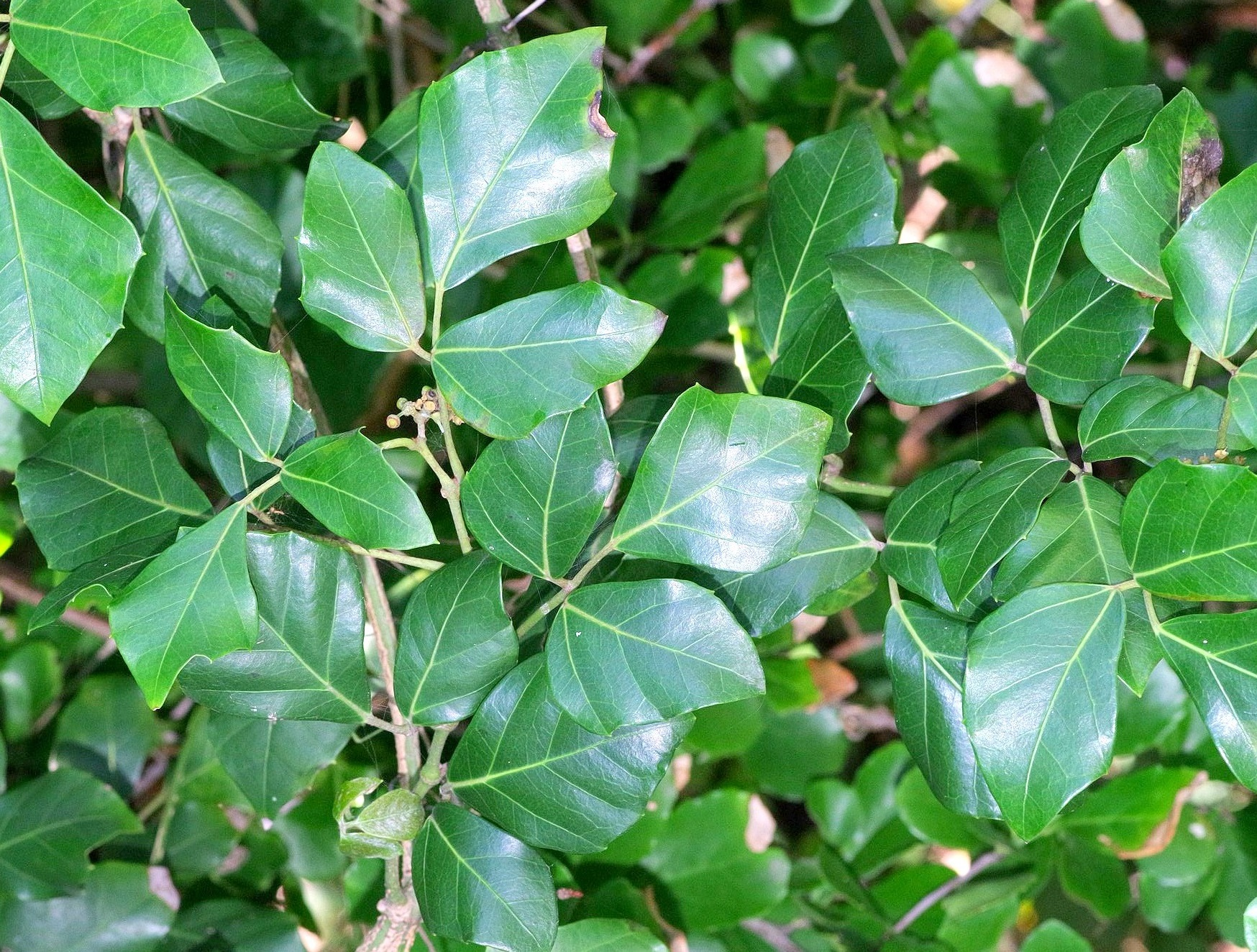
Cultivated plant in a shady area

It is used as a garden plant, where it prefers cool, sheltered areas in summer (though winter warmth is necessary as it is frost tender). In the garden, it can be found on trellises, staircases, entrances and in hanging baskets. The plant can be grown from both cuttings and seeds.

The vine attracts birds due to its edible grape-like fruits, which are also consumed by humans. The plant's stems are used to make rope, hence one of the plant's common names 'ropewood'. The plant is seldom affected by pests or diseases, in addition to it being tough and enduring some negligence and living in poor conditions.

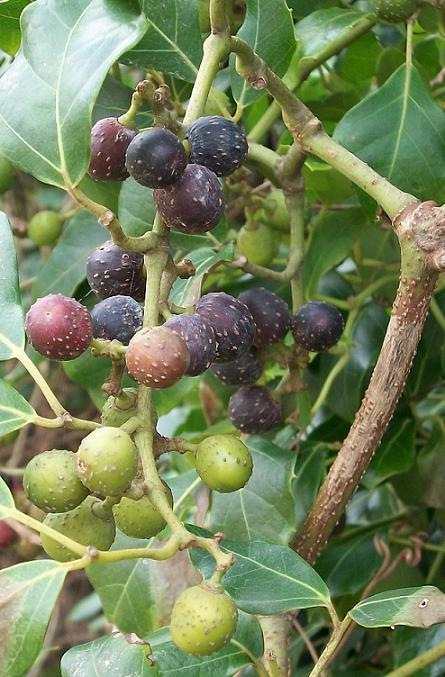
Fruit

It should be distinguished from the oak-leaved Cissus alata by its diamond-shaped (rhombic) leaves, although the two species names have been misapplied and mistaken for each other.

=== Medicinal ===
In folk medicine, the plant's roots have been used to assist delivery for pregnant women.

The plant showed the highest inhibition of prostaglandin synthesis with 56% inhibition, compared to 89% inhibition by the indomethacin standard, implying its potential to be used as an anti-inflammatory agent. The plant exhibited some level of antimicrobial activity, with its roots illustrating the highest repressive activity against various microorganisms. Its stem extract and the standards chloramphenicol and tetracycline all signaled an inhibition zone diameter against Salmonella sp.

Aqueous and methanol extracts of the plant were inspected to ascertain its therapeutic potentials as anticancer agents – In vitro, the antiproliferative activity against HepG2 cells, a human liver cancer cell line, was determined.

The plant contains compounds (polyphenols) with powerful radical-scavenging and antiradical-generating effects. Its extracts revealed more than 50% antioxidant activity compared with values acquired for the commercial antioxidants which were used as standards. The plant also inhibited the 1, 1-Diphenyl-2-picrylhydrazyl free radical with about 98% radical scavenging activity. Xanthine oxidase was inhibited by 88.20% by its root extract.
