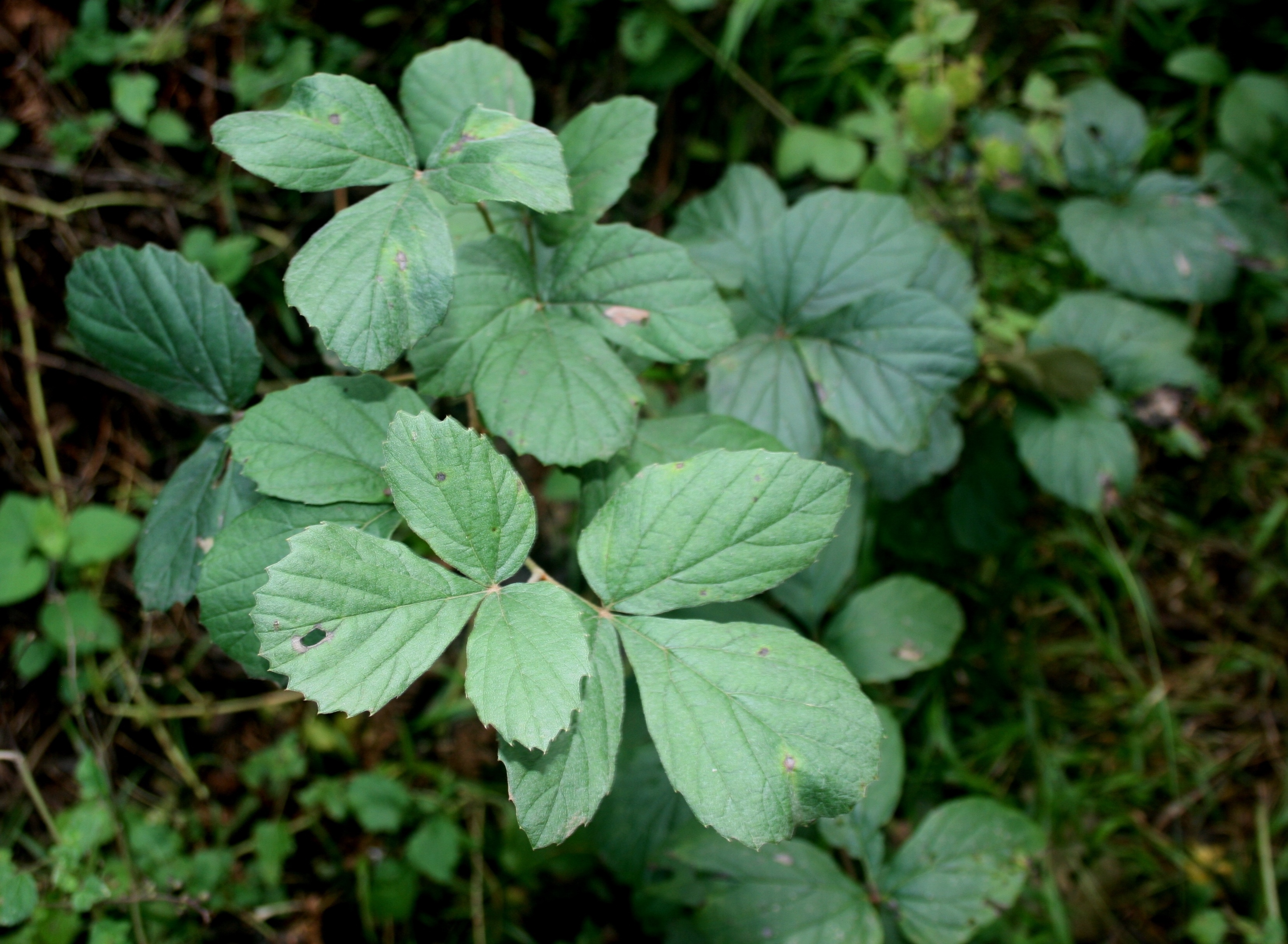

Scientific classification
- Kingdom: Plantae
- Clade: Tracheophytes
- Clade: Angiosperms
- Clade: Eudicots
- Clade: Rosids
- Order: Vitales
- Family: Vitaceae
- Genus: Rhoicissus
- Species: R. tridentata

Binomial name
- Rhoicissus tridentata (L.f.) Wild & R.B.Drumm.

= Rhoicissus tridentata =

Bushman's grape

Species of vine

Rhoicissus tridentata is a climbing plant in the family Vitaceae.

Parts of the plant are used in South Africa in traditional herbal remedies during pregnancy.

== Gallery ==
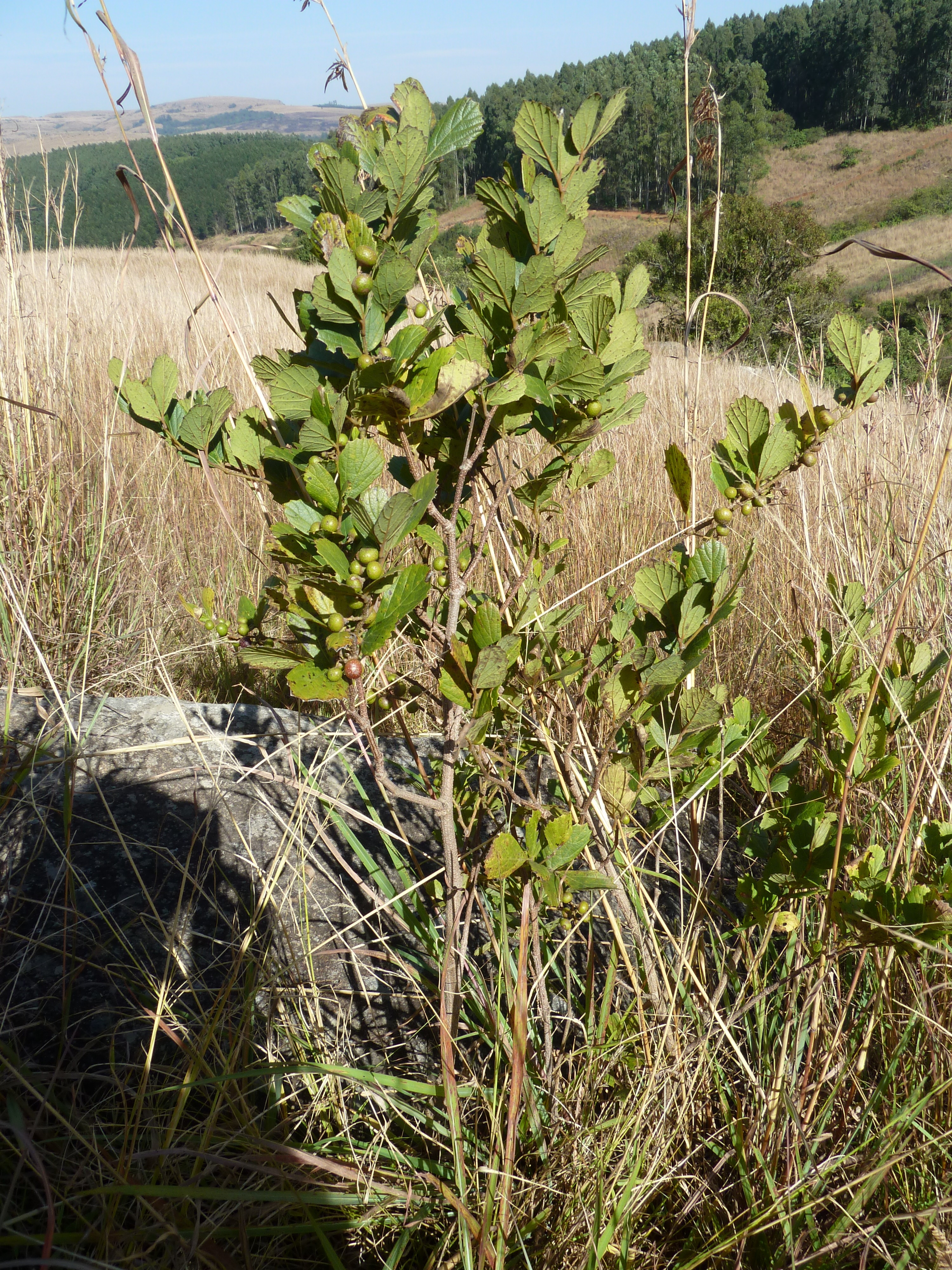
Habit in rocky grassland

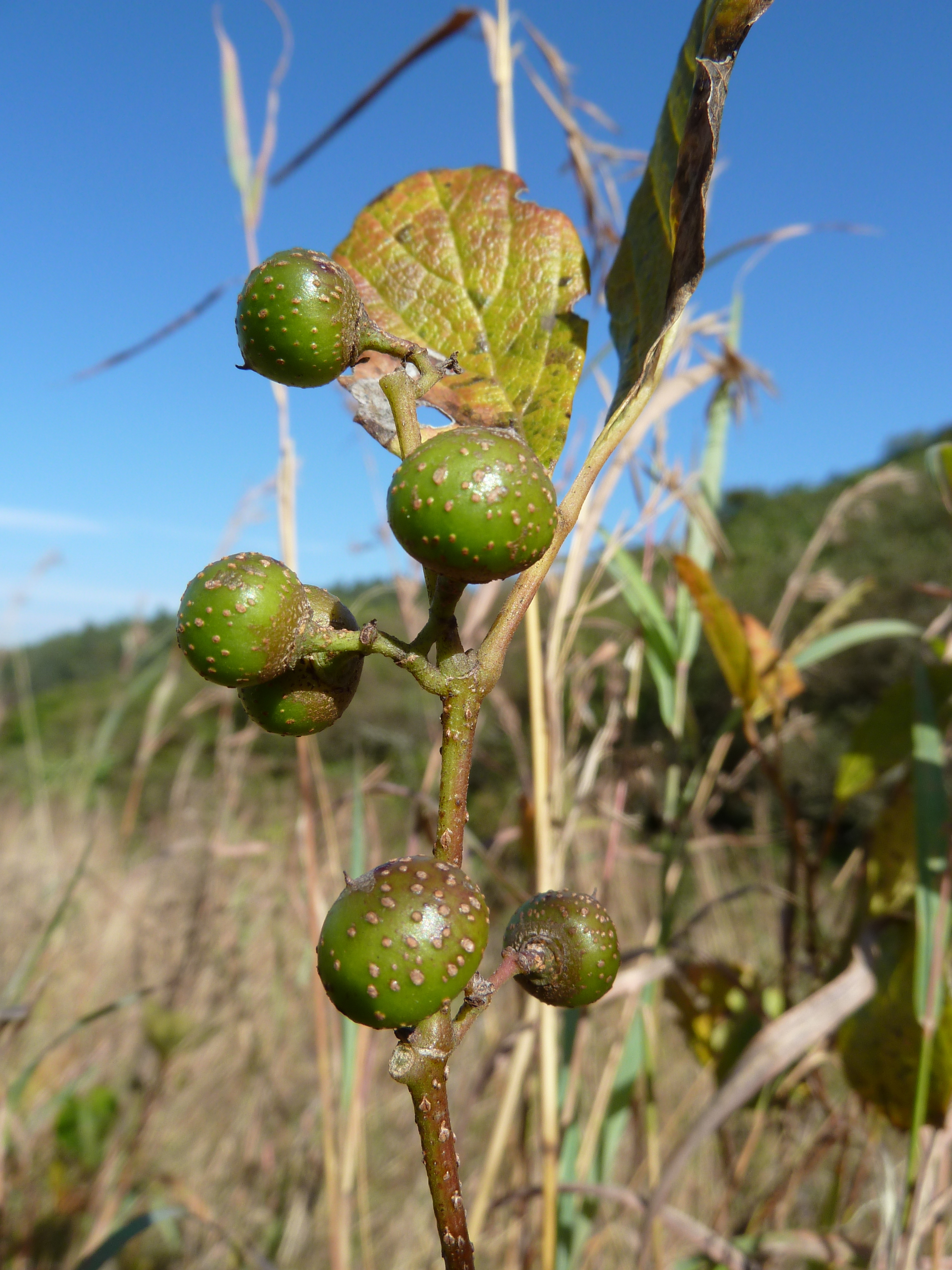
Fruit

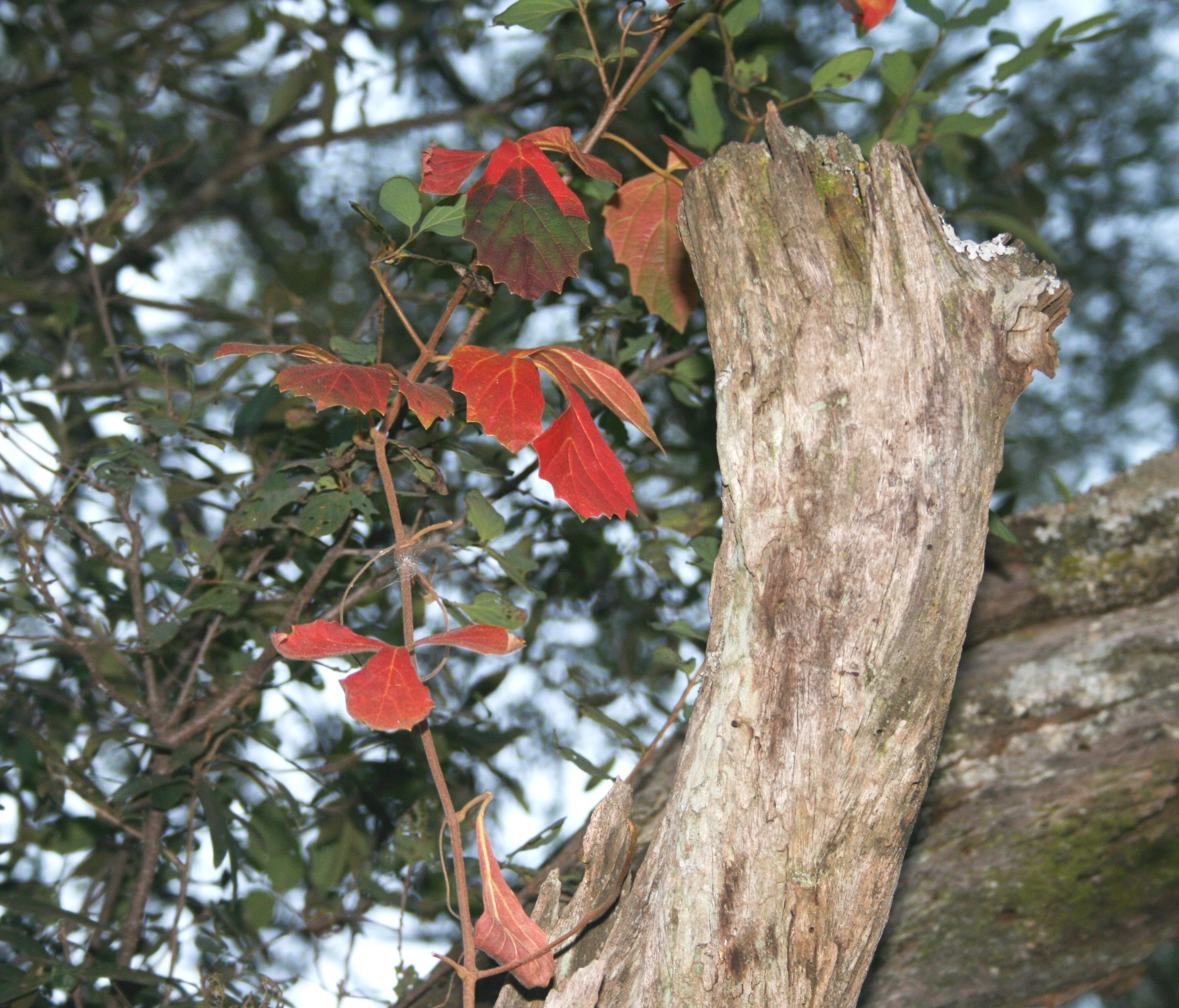
Winter foliage
