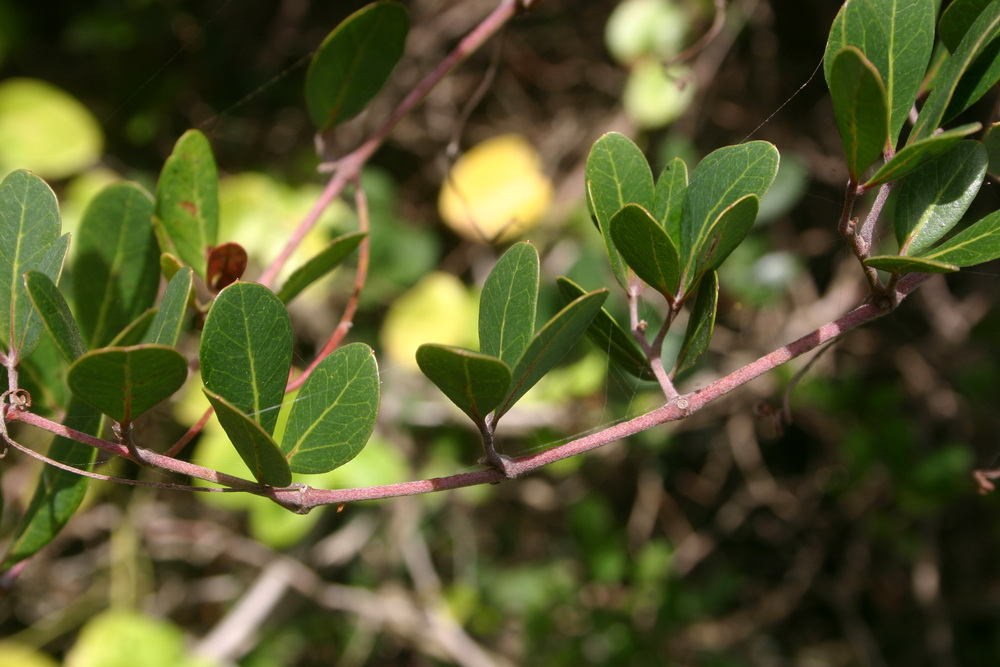

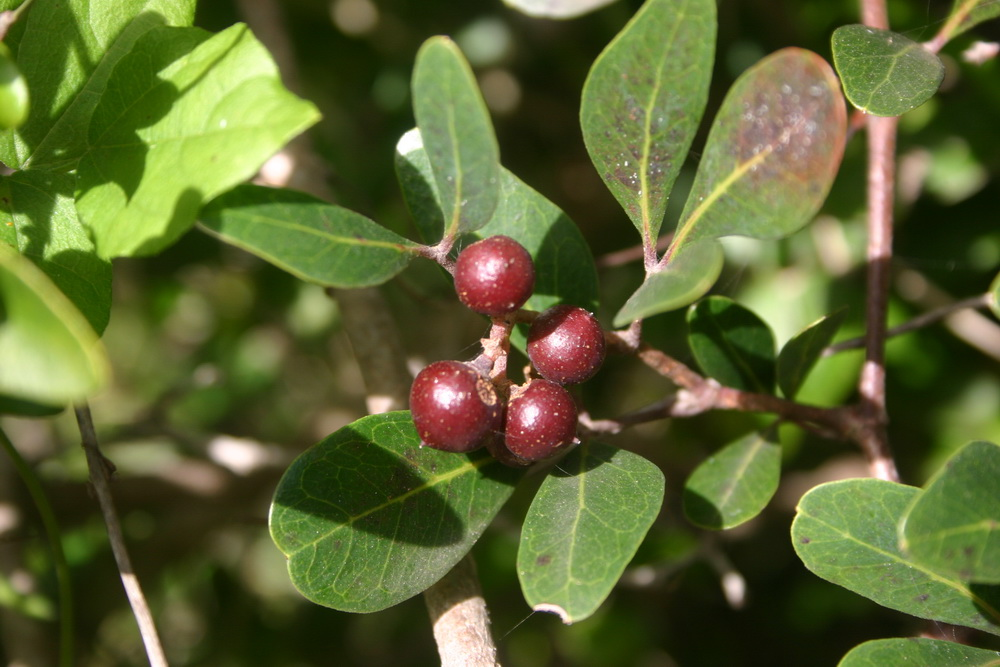

Scientific classification
- Kingdom: Plantae
- Clade: Tracheophytes
- Clade: Angiosperms
- Clade: Eudicots
- Clade: Rosids
- Order: Vitales
- Family: Vitaceae
- Genus: Rhoicissus
- Species: R. digitata

Binomial name
- Rhoicissus digitata (L.f.) Gilg & Brandt

= Rhoicissus digitata =

Dune grape

Species of grapevine

Rhoicissus digitata (the baboon grape or the dune grape) is a vigorous, evergreen vine that is indigenous to southern Africa. It is increasingly popular as an ornamental creeper in gardens, and it has a wide range of uses in traditional medicine.
