= List of moths of Australia (Heliozelidae) =

Partial list of Australian moths

This is a list of the Australian moth species of the family Heliozelidae. It also acts as an index to the species articles and forms part of the full List of moths of Australia.

- Heliozela anantia Meyrick, 1897
- Heliozela autogenes Meyrick, 1897
- Heliozela catoptrias Meyrick, 1897
- Heliozela crypsimetalla Meyrick, 1897
- Heliozela eucarpa Meyrick, 1897
- Heliozela isochroa Meyrick, 1897
- Heliozela microphylla Meyrick, 1897
- Heliozela nephelitis Meyrick, 1897
- Heliozela prodela Meyrick, 1897
- Heliozela rutilella (Walker, 1864)
- Heliozela siderias Meyrick, 1897
- Heliozela trisphaera Meyrick, 1897
- Hoplophanes acrozona Meyrick, 1897
- Hoplophanes aglaodora (Meyrick, 1897)
- Hoplophanes argochalca (Meyrick, 1897)
- Hoplophanes chalcolitha Meyrick, 1897
- Hoplophanes chalcopetala (Meyrick, 1897)
- Hoplophanes chalcophaedra Turner, 1923
- Hoplophanes chlorochrysa Meyrick, 1897
- Hoplophanes electritis Meyrick, 1897
- Hoplophanes haplochrysa Meyrick, 1897
- Hoplophanes hemiphragma Meyrick, 1897
- Hoplophanes heterospila Meyrick, 1897
- Hoplophanes monosema Meyrick, 1897
- Hoplophanes niphochalca Meyrick, 1897
- Hoplophanes panchalca Meyrick, 1897
- Hoplophanes peristera Meyrick, 1897
- Hoplophanes phaeochalca Meyrick, 1897
- Hoplophanes philomacha Meyrick, 1897
- Hoplophanes porphyropla Meyrick, 1897
- Hoplophanes semicuprea Meyrick, 1897
- Hoplophanes tritocosma Meyrick, 1897
- Pseliastis spectropa Meyrick, 1897
- Pseliastis trizona Meyrick, 1897
- Pseliastis xanthodisca Meyrick, 1897

The following species belongs to the family Heliozelidae, but has not been assigned to a genus yet. Given here is the original name given to the species when it was first described:

- Hoplophanes lithocolleta Turner, 1916
