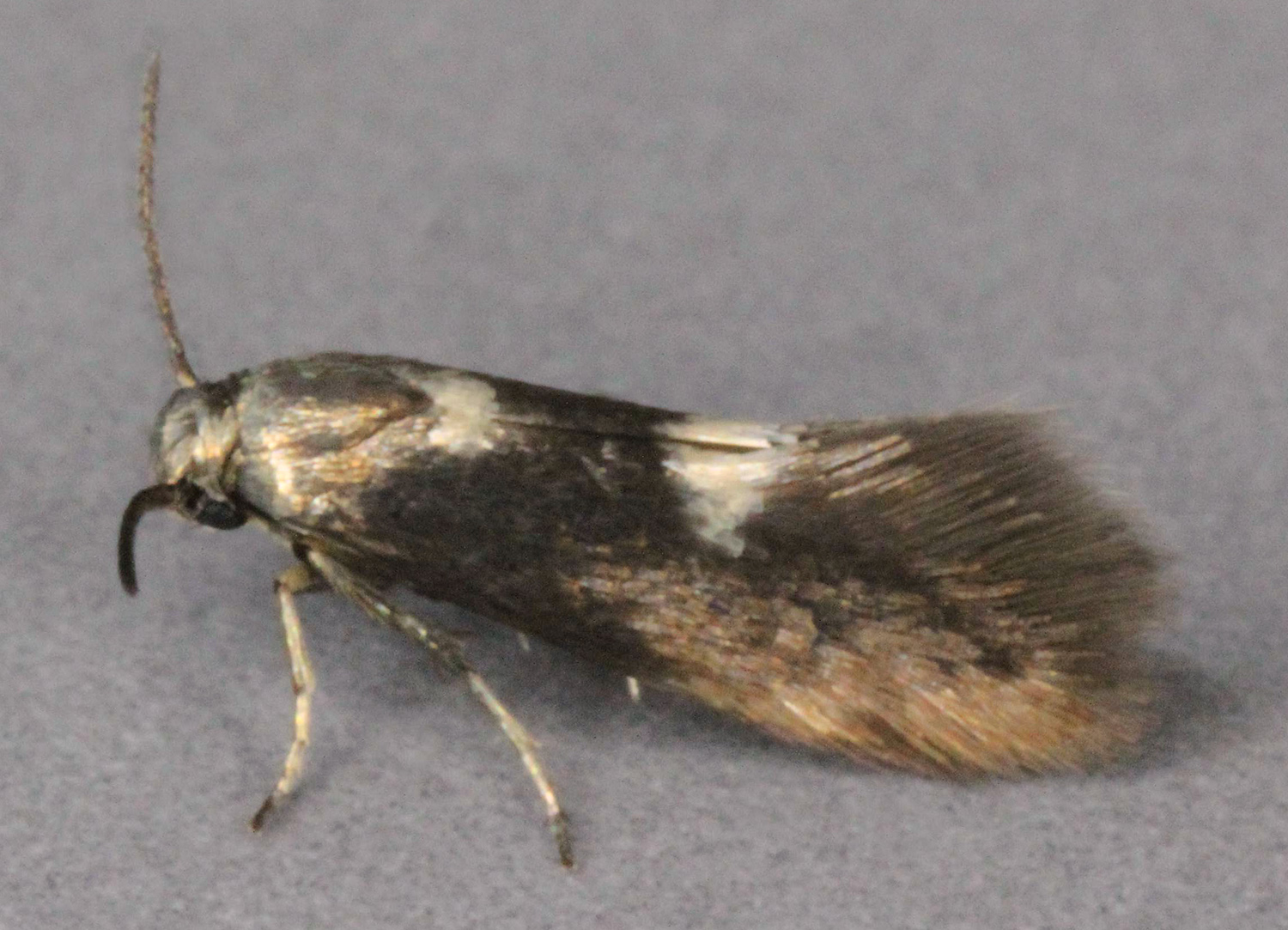
- Heliozela hammoniella, Sarnau, North Wales

Scientific classification
- Kingdom: Animalia
- Phylum: Arthropoda
- Clade: Pancrustacea
- Class: Insecta
- Order: Lepidoptera
- Family: Heliozelidae
- Genus: Heliozela
- Species: H. hammoniella

Binomial name
- Heliozela hammoniella Sorhagen, 1885

Synonyms
- Tinagma betulae Stainton, 1890

= Heliozela hammoniella =

Species of moth

Heliozela hammoniella is a moth of the Heliozelidae family. It is found in Ireland, Great Britain, the Netherlands, France, Germany, Austria, the Czech Republic, Poland, Romania, Lithuania, Latvia, Fennoscandia, and Russia.

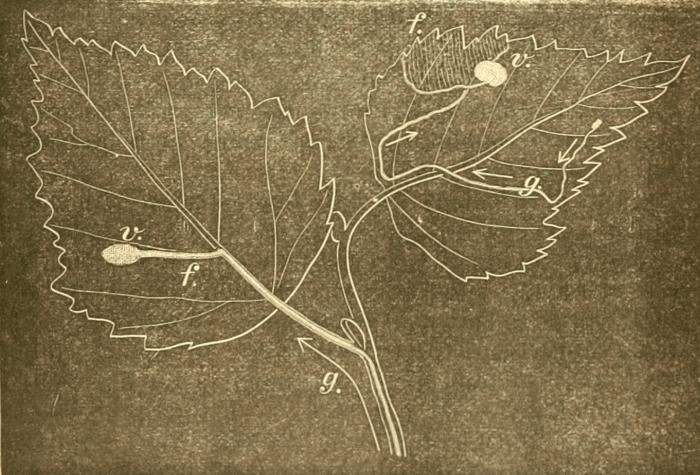
Mine

The wingspan is 5–7 mm. Differs from Heliozela resplendella as follows : forewings less bronzy-tinged, termen less oblique.

Adults are on wing in May and June.

The larvae feed on Betula pubescens. Larvae can be found from July to August.
