= Heliozela sobrinella =

Scientific classification
- Domain: Eukaryota
- Kingdom: Animalia
- Phylum: Arthropoda
- Class: Insecta
- Order: Lepidoptera
- Family: Heliozelidae
- Genus: Heliozela
- Species: H. sobrinella

Binomial name
- Heliozela sobrinella Deventer, 1904

Species of moth

Heliozela sobrinella is a moth of the Heliozelidae family. It was described by Deventer in 1904 as almost identical to Heliozela praeustella but a bit larger, with a wingspan of 6 mm (0.24 in). It is found on Java.
