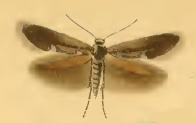
- Heliozela resplendella

Scientific classification
- Domain: Eukaryota
- Kingdom: Animalia
- Phylum: Arthropoda
- Class: Insecta
- Order: Lepidoptera
- Family: Heliozelidae
- Genus: Heliozela; Herrich-Schäffer, 1853

= Heliozela =

Genus of moths

Heliozela is genus of moths of the family Heliozelidae, described by Gottlieb August Wilhelm Herrich-Schäffer in 1853.

== Species ==
- Heliozela aesella
- Heliozela ahenea
- Heliozela anantia
- Heliozela angulata
- Heliozela anna
- Heliozela argyrozona
- Heliozela autogenes
- Heliozela biprominens
- Heliozela brevitalea
- Heliozela castaneella
- Heliozela catoptrias
- Heliozela crypsimetalla
- Heliozela cuprea
- Heliozela eucarpa
- Heliozela glabrata
- Heliozela gracilis
- Heliozela hammoniella
- Heliozela isochroa
- Heliozela limbata
- Heliozela lithargyrella
- Heliozela macrocerella
- Heliozela microphylla
- Heliozela nephelitis
- Heliozela praeustella
- Heliozela prodela
- Heliozela resplendella
- Heliozela rutilella
- Heliozela sericiella
- Heliozela siderias
- Heliozela sobrinella
- Heliozela subpurpurea
- Heliozela trisphaera
