= Corythoxestis tricalysiella =

Scientific classification
- Domain: Eukaryota
- Kingdom: Animalia
- Phylum: Arthropoda
- Class: Insecta
- Order: Lepidoptera
- Family: Gracillariidae
- Genus: Corythoxestis
- Species: C. tricalysiella

Binomial name
- Corythoxestis tricalysiella Kobayashi, Huang & Hirowatari, 2013

Species of moth

Corythoxestis tricalysiella is a moth of the family Gracillariidae. It is found on Ishigaki Island, in the southwest of the Ryukyu Islands, Japan.

The wingspan is 6.6–7 mm.

The larvae feed on Tricalysia dubia (=Diplospora dubia), to which the specific name refers. The larvae mine the leaves of their host plant.
