= Heliozela biprominens =

Scientific classification
- Kingdom: Animalia
- Phylum: Arthropoda
- Class: Insecta
- Order: Lepidoptera
- Family: Heliozelidae
- Genus: Heliozela
- Species: H. biprominens

Binomial name
- Heliozela biprominens Lee, Hirowatari & Kuroko, 2006

Species of moth

Heliozela biprominens is a moth of the family Heliozelidae. It was described by Lee, Hirowatari and Kuroko in 2006 and is endemic to Japan (Honshu).

The length of the forewings is 2.7–3.3 millimetres (0.11–0.13 in).
