= Corythoxestis yaeyamensis =

Scientific classification
- Kingdom: Animalia
- Phylum: Arthropoda
- Class: Insecta
- Order: Lepidoptera
- Family: Gracillariidae
- Genus: Corythoxestis
- Species: C. yaeyamensis

Binomial name
- Corythoxestis yaeyamensis (Kumata, 1998)

Synonyms
- Cryphiomystis yaeyamensis Kumata, 1998

Species of moth

Corythoxestis yaeyamensis is a moth of the family Gracillariidae. It is known from the Ryukyu Islands, Japan.

The wingspan is 3.8-4.9 mm. The hostplant for the species is Saurauia tristyla. They mine the leaves of their host plant.
