= Corythoxestis sunosei =

Scientific classification
- Kingdom: Animalia
- Phylum: Arthropoda
- Class: Insecta
- Order: Lepidoptera
- Family: Gracillariidae
- Genus: Corythoxestis
- Species: C. sunosei

Binomial name
- Corythoxestis sunosei (Kumata, 1998)

Synonyms
- Cryphiomystis sunosei Kumata, 1998

Species of moth

Corythoxestis sunosei is a moth of the family Gracillariidae. It is known from Japan (Kyūshū, Honshū, Okinawa) and China (Hunan).

The wingspan is 4.4-6.7 mm.

The host plants for the species are Adina pilulifera, Mussaenda parviflora, Mussaenda esquirolii, and Uncaria rhynchophylla. The larvae mine the leaves of their host plant.
