= Corythoxestis cyanolampra =

Scientific classification
- Domain: Eukaryota
- Kingdom: Animalia
- Phylum: Arthropoda
- Class: Insecta
- Order: Lepidoptera
- Family: Gracillariidae
- Genus: Corythoxestis
- Species: C. cyanolampra

Binomial name
- Corythoxestis cyanolampra (Vári, 1961)

Synonyms
- Cryphiomystis cyanolampra Vári, 1961

Species of moth

Corythoxestis cyanolampra is a moth of the family Gracillariidae. It is known from South Africa.

The larvae feed on Burchellia bubalina. They mine the leaves of their host plant.
