= Heliozela cuprea =

Scientific classification
- Kingdom: Animalia
- Phylum: Arthropoda
- Class: Insecta
- Order: Lepidoptera
- Family: Heliozelidae
- Genus: Heliozela
- Species: H. cuprea

Binomial name
- Heliozela cuprea Walsingham, 1897

Species of moth

Heliozela cuprea is a moth of the family Heliozelidae. It was described by Thomas de Grey, 6th Baron Walsingham, in 1897. It is found in the West Indies.
