= Heliozela subpurpurea =

Scientific classification
- Kingdom: Animalia
- Phylum: Arthropoda
- Class: Insecta
- Order: Lepidoptera
- Family: Heliozelidae
- Genus: Heliozela
- Species: H. subpurpurea

Binomial name
- Heliozela subpurpurea Meyrick, 1934

Species of moth

Heliozela subpurpurea is a moth of the family Heliozelidae. It was described by Edward Meyrick in 1934. It is found in Japan.
