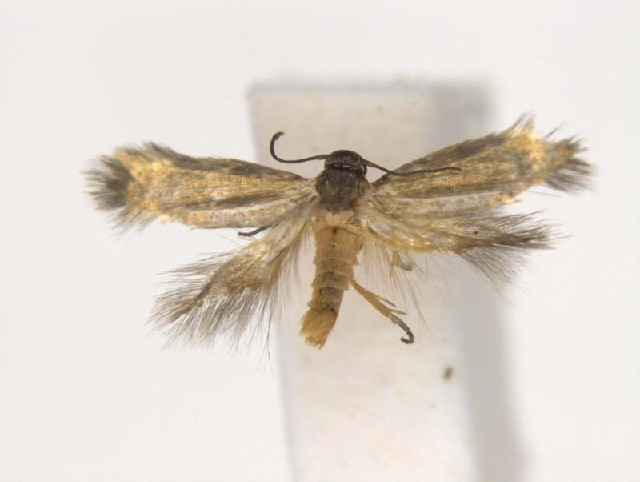
- Specimen of P. xanthodisca

Scientific classification
- Kingdom: Animalia
- Phylum: Arthropoda
- Class: Insecta
- Order: Lepidoptera
- Family: Heliozelidae
- Genus: Pseliastis; Meyrick, 1897

Type species
- P. trizona Meyrick, 1897

Species
- P. spectropa Meyrick, 1897; P. trizona Meyrick, 1897; P. xanthodisca Meyrick, 1897

= Pseliastis =

Genus of moths

Pseliastis is genus of moths in the family Heliozelidae, first described by Edward Meyrick in 1897. Three species are currently described, all endemic to Australia.

== Species ==
This genus includes the following species:

- Pseliastis spectropa Meyrick, 1897 – Tasmania
- Pseliastis trizona Meyrick, 1897 – Tasmania
- Pseliastis xanthodisca Meyrick, 1897 – Tasmania

A 2017 molecular phylogenetics analysis of the family Heliozelidae identified several undescribed species from southern Australia that the authors tentatively attributed to the genus Pseliatis, however, they were not formally described.
