= Hoplophanes =

Scientific classification
- Kingdom: Animalia
- Phylum: Arthropoda
- Clade: Pancrustacea
- Class: Insecta
- Order: Lepidoptera
- Family: Heliozelidae
- Genus: Hoplophanes; Meyrick, 1897

Synonyms
- Prophylactis Meyrick, 1897

Genus of moths

Hoplophanes is genus of moths of the family Heliozelidae. It was described by Edward Meyrick in 1897.

== Species ==
- Hoplophanes acrozona Meyrick, 1897
- Hoplophanes aglaodora (Meyrick, 1897)
- Hoplophanes argochalca (Meyrick, 1897)
- Hoplophanes chalcolitha Meyrick, 1897
- Hoplophanes chalcopetala (Meyrick, 1897)
- Hoplophanes chalcophaedra Turner, 1923
- Hoplophanes chlorochrysa Meyrick, 1897
- Hoplophanes electritis Meyrick, 1897
- Hoplophanes haplochrysa Meyrick, 1897
- Hoplophanes hemiphragma Meyrick, 1897
- Hoplophanes heterospila Meyrick, 1897
- Hoplophanes lithocolleta Turner, 1916
- Hoplophanes memoranda (Meyrick, 1922)
- Hoplophanes monosema Meyrick, 1897
- Hoplophanes niphochalca Meyrick, 1897
- Hoplophanes panchalca Meyrick, 1897
- Hoplophanes peristera Meyrick, 1897
- Hoplophanes phaeochalca Meyrick, 1897
- Hoplophanes philomacha Meyrick, 1897
- Hoplophanes porphyropla Meyrick, 1897
- Hoplophanes semicuprea Meyrick, 1897
- Hoplophanes tritocosma Meyrick, 1897
