= Heliozela castaneella =

Scientific classification
- Kingdom: Animalia
- Phylum: Arthropoda
- Class: Insecta
- Order: Lepidoptera
- Family: Heliozelidae
- Genus: Heliozela
- Species: H. castaneella

Binomial name
- Heliozela castaneella Inoue, 1982

Species of moth

Heliozela castaneella is a moth of the family Heliozelidae. It was described by Hiroshi Inoue in 1982. It is found in Japan.

The wingspan is 4–5 mm.
