= Heliozela glabrata =

Scientific classification
- Kingdom: Animalia
- Phylum: Arthropoda
- Class: Insecta
- Order: Lepidoptera
- Family: Heliozelidae
- Genus: Heliozela
- Species: H. glabrata

Binomial name
- Heliozela glabrata Lee, Hirowatari & Kuroko, 2006

Species of moth

Heliozela glabrata is a moth of the family Heliozelidae. It was described by Lee, Hirowatari and Kuroko in 2006. It is found in Japan (Honshu).

The length of the forewings is about 2.9 millimetres (0.11 in).
