= Corythoxestis pentarcha =

Scientific classification
- Kingdom: Animalia
- Phylum: Arthropoda
- Class: Insecta
- Order: Lepidoptera
- Family: Gracillariidae
- Genus: Corythoxestis
- Species: C. pentarcha

Binomial name
- Corythoxestis pentarcha (Meyrick, 1922)

Synonyms
- Cryphiomystis pentarcha Meyrick, 1922

Species of moth

Corythoxestis pentarcha is a moth of the family Gracillariidae. It is known from Réunion, Malaysia, and Sri Lanka. The hostplants for the species include Coffea robusta and Amomum magnificum.

== Subspecies ==
- Corythoxestis pentarcha pentarcha
- Corythoxestis pentarcha borbonica Guillermet, 2011 (Réunion)
