= Heliozela gracilis =

Scientific classification
- Kingdom: Animalia
- Phylum: Arthropoda
- Clade: Pancrustacea
- Class: Insecta
- Order: Lepidoptera
- Family: Heliozelidae
- Genus: Heliozela
- Species: H. gracilis

Binomial name
- Heliozela gracilis Zeller, 1873

Species of moth

Heliozela gracilis is a moth of the family Heliozelidae. It was described by Philipp Christoph Zeller in 1873. It is found in North America, including Texas.
