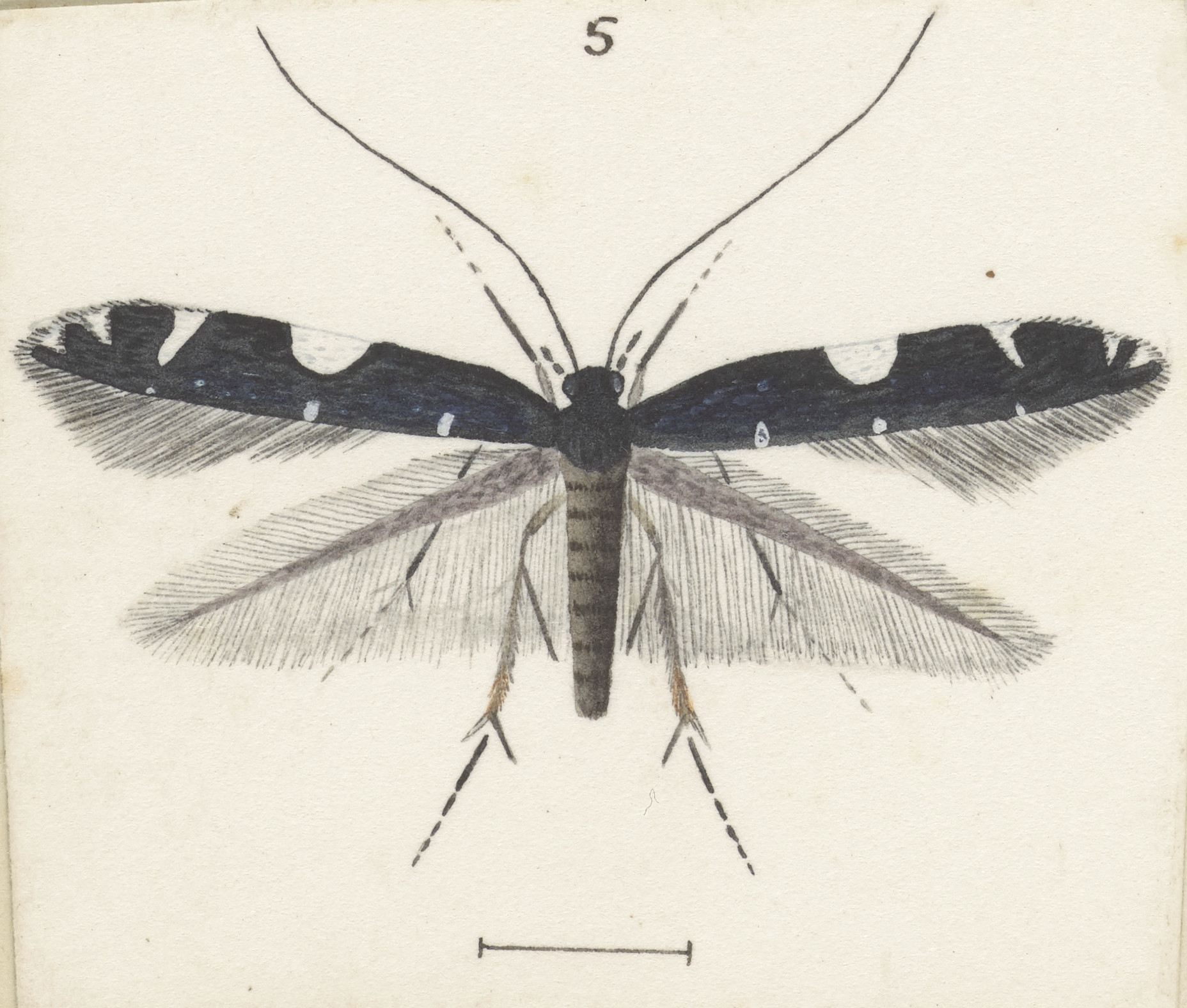
- Corythoxestis zorionella

Scientific classification
- Domain: Eukaryota
- Kingdom: Animalia
- Phylum: Arthropoda
- Class: Insecta
- Order: Lepidoptera
- Family: Gracillariidae
- Subfamily: Phyllocnistinae
- Genus: Corythoxestis; Meyrick, 1921

Type species
- Heliozela praeustella van Deventer, 1904

Species
- 8 species (see text)

Synonyms
- Cryphiomystis Meyrick, 1922

= Corythoxestis =

Genus of moths

Corythoxestis is a genus of moths in the family Gracillariidae. As with their close relatives, they are small leaf-mining moths.

== Species ==
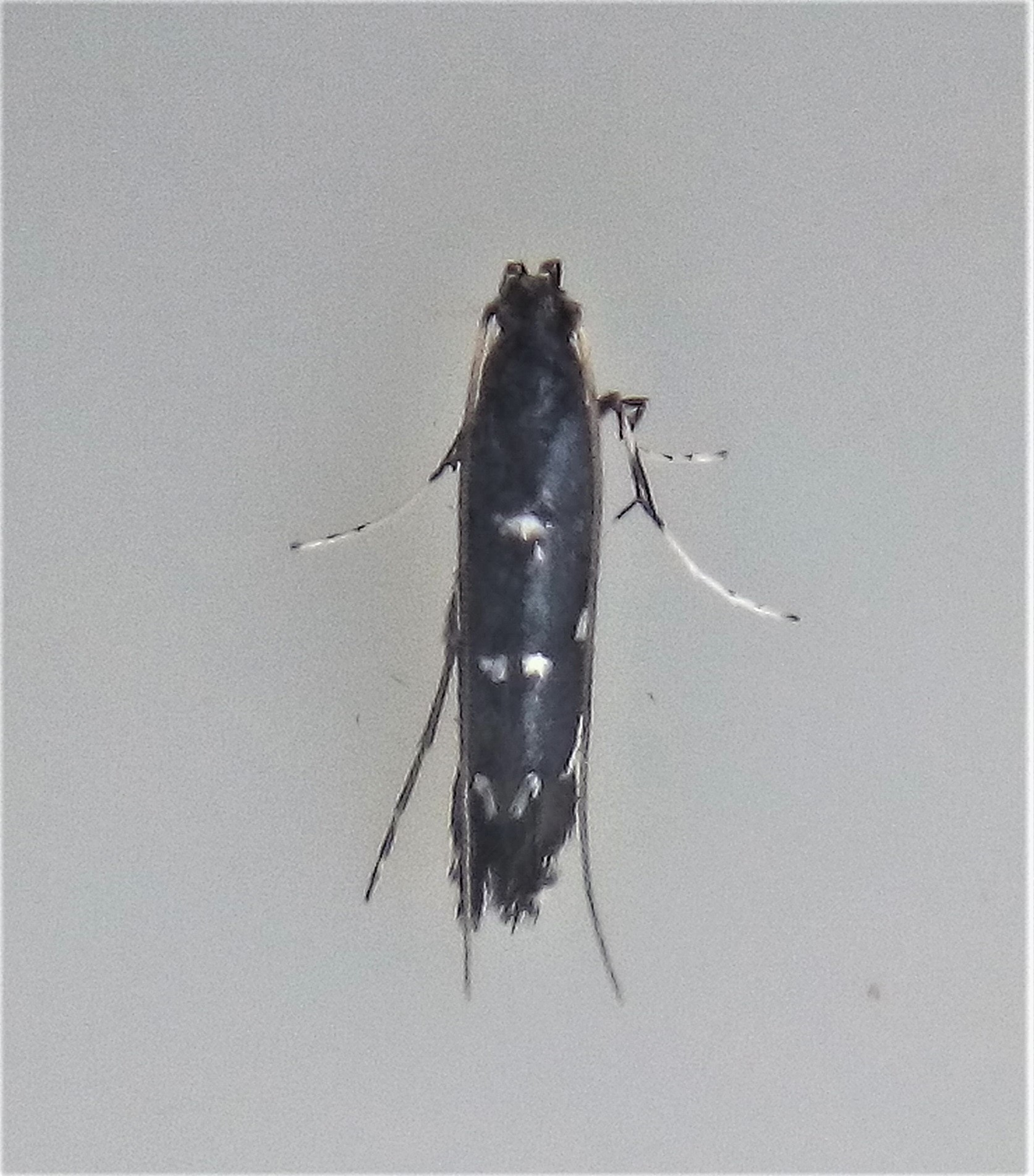
Corythoxestis zorionella

There are eight recognized species:

- Corythoxestis aletreuta (Meyrick, 1936)
- Corythoxestis cyanolampra Vári, 1961
- Corythoxestis pentarcha (Meyrick, 1922)
- Corythoxestis praeustella (van Deventer, 1904)
- Corythoxestis sunosei (Kumata, 1998)
- Corythoxestis tricalysiella Kobayashi, Huang & Hirowatari, 2013
- Corythoxestis yaeyamensis (Kumata, 1998)
- Corythoxestis zorionella (Hudson, 1918)
