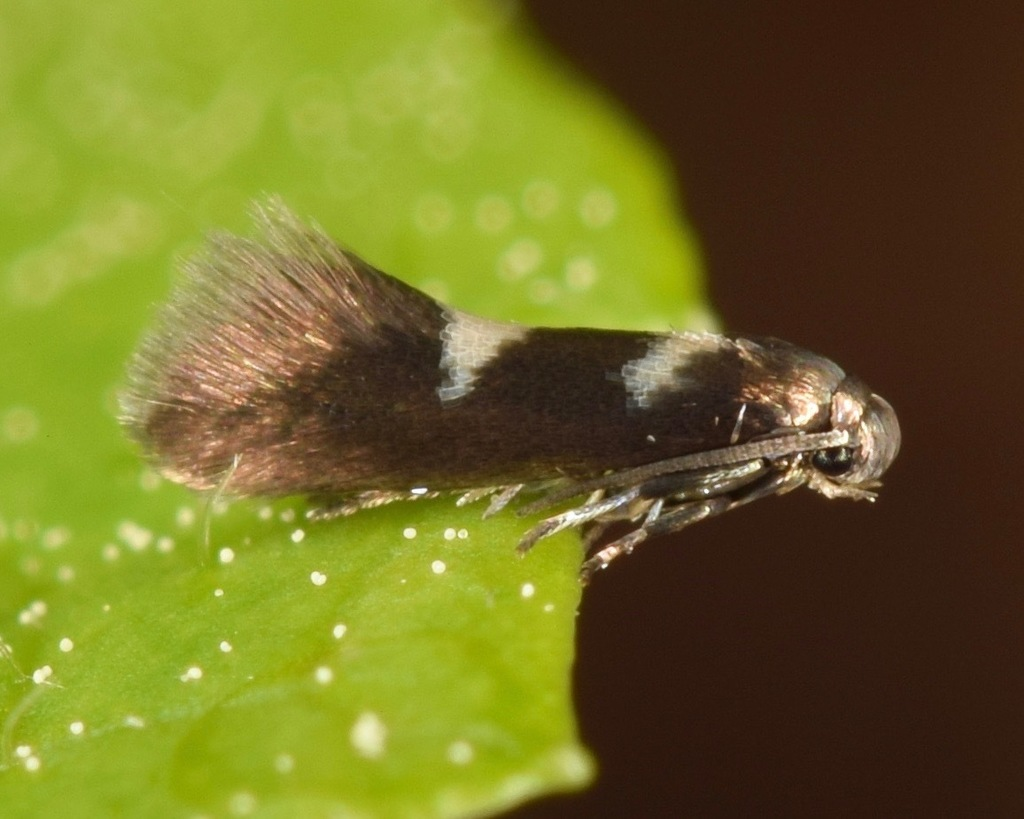

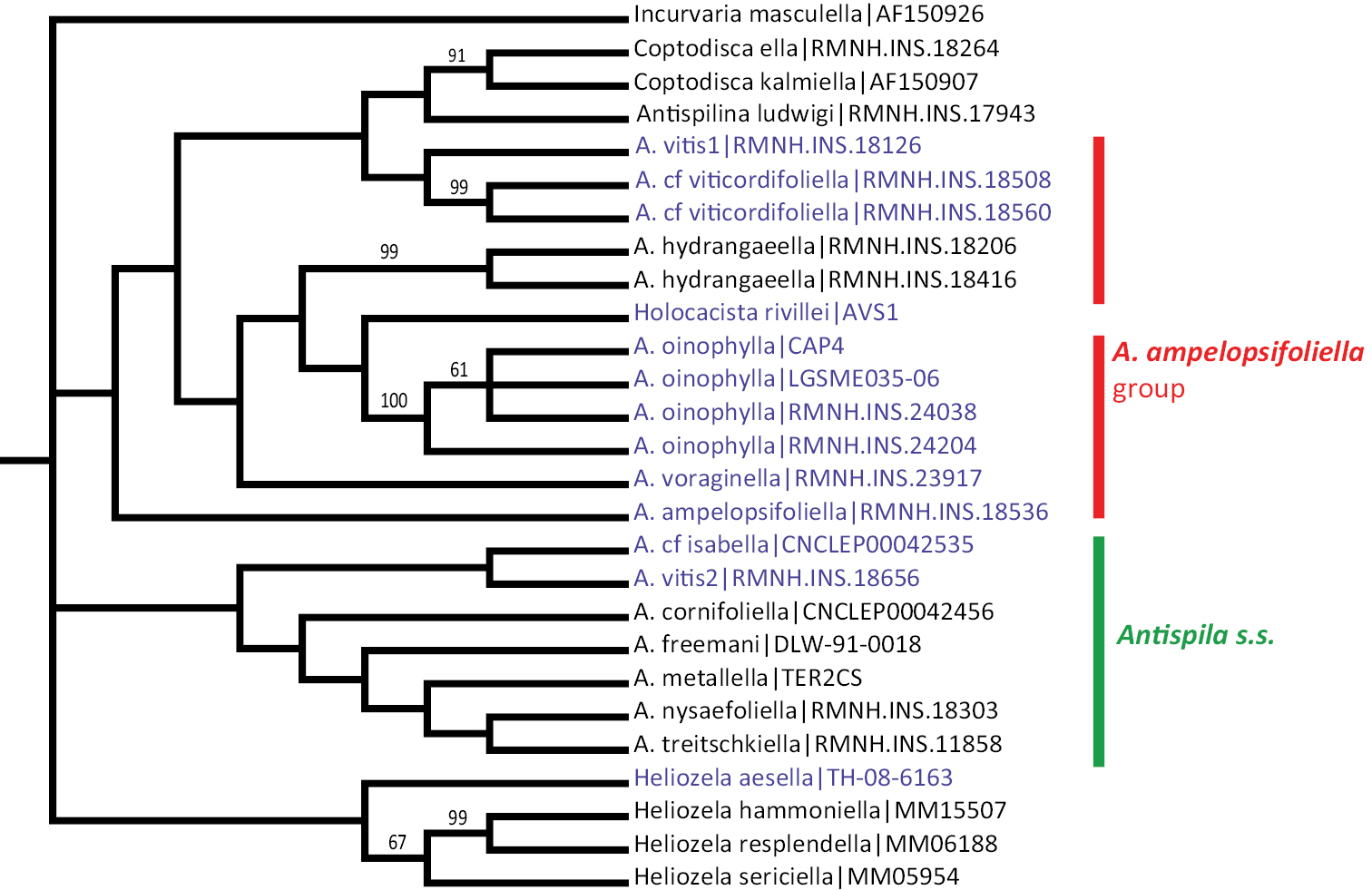
- Cladogram of H. aesella and related species

Scientific classification
- Kingdom: Animalia
- Phylum: Arthropoda
- Clade: Pancrustacea
- Class: Insecta
- Order: Lepidoptera
- Family: Heliozelidae
- Genus: Heliozela
- Species: H. aesella

Binomial name
- Heliozela aesella Chambers, 1877

= Heliozela aesella =

Species of moth

Heliozela aesella is a moth of the family Heliozelidae. It was described by Vactor Tousey Chambers in 1877. It is found in the United States, including Illinois, Iowa, Kentucky, Massachusetts, Minnesota, New York, Ohio and Wisconsin and Quebec in Canada.

Adults are on wing from late April to early May in one generation per year.

The larvae feed on Vitis species. Full-grown larvae cut out a case and drop to the ground. Pupation takes place within this case after overwintering. Larvae and galls can be found in late May.
