= Hoplophanes memoranda =

Scientific classification
- Kingdom: Animalia
- Phylum: Arthropoda
- Clade: Pancrustacea
- Class: Insecta
- Order: Lepidoptera
- Family: Heliozelidae
- Genus: Hoplophanes
- Species: H. memoranda

Binomial name
- Hoplophanes memoranda (Meyrick, 1897)

Synonyms
- Prophylactis memoranda Meyrick, 1897

Species of moth

Hoplophanes memoranda is a moth of the Heliozelidae family. It was described by Edward Meyrick in 1897. It is found in Western Australia.
