= Heliozela limbata =

Scientific classification
- Kingdom: Animalia
- Phylum: Arthropoda
- Clade: Pancrustacea
- Class: Insecta
- Order: Lepidoptera
- Family: Heliozelidae
- Genus: Heliozela
- Species: H. limbata

Binomial name
- Heliozela limbata Lee, Hirowatari & Kuroko, 2006

Species of moth

Heliozela limbata is a moth of the family Heliozelidae. It was described by Lee, Hirowatari and Kuroko in 2006 and is endemic to Japan (Honshu and Kyushu).

The length of the forewings is 3.4–3.9 millimetres (0.13–0.15 in).

The larvae feed on Quercus serrata. They mine the leaves of their host plant.
