= Heliozela brevitalea =

Scientific classification
- Kingdom: Animalia
- Phylum: Arthropoda
- Class: Insecta
- Order: Lepidoptera
- Family: Heliozelidae
- Genus: Heliozela
- Species: H. brevitalea

Binomial name
- Heliozela brevitalea Lee, Hirowatari & Kuroko, 2006

Species of moth

Heliozela brevitalea is a moth of the family Heliozelidae. It was described by Lee, Hirowatari and Kuroko in 2006 and is endemic to Japan (Honshu).

The length of the forewings is 2.8–3.2 millimetres (0.11–0.13 in).
