= Heliozela angulata =

Scientific classification
- Kingdom: Animalia
- Phylum: Arthropoda
- Class: Insecta
- Order: Lepidoptera
- Family: Heliozelidae
- Genus: Heliozela
- Species: H. angulata

Binomial name
- Heliozela angulata Lee, Hirowatari & Kuroko, 2006

Species of moth

Heliozela angulata is a moth of the family Heliozelidae. It was described by Lee, Hirowatari and Kuroko in 2006 and is endemic to Japan (Honshu).

The length of the forewings is 2.7–3.4 millimetres (0.11–0.13 in).
