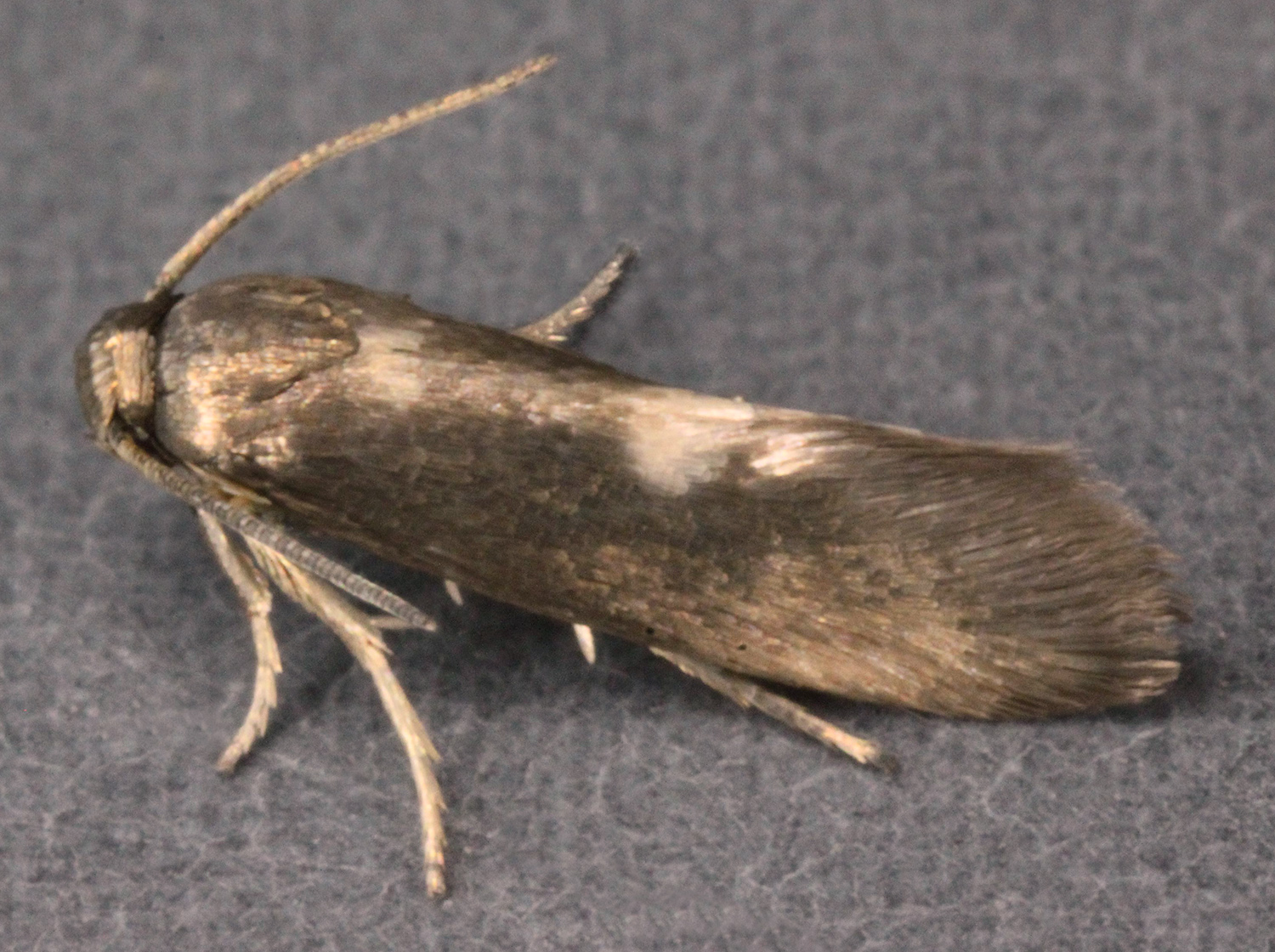

Scientific classification
- Kingdom: Animalia
- Phylum: Arthropoda
- Clade: Pancrustacea
- Class: Insecta
- Order: Lepidoptera
- Family: Heliozelidae
- Genus: Heliozela
- Species: H. sericiella

Binomial name
- Heliozela sericiella (Haworth, 1828)

Synonyms
- Tinea sericiella Haworth, 1828; Aechmia saltatricella Fischer von Röslerstamm, 1841; Aechmia stanneella Fischer von Röslerstamm, 1841

= Heliozela sericiella =

Species of moth

Heliozela sericiella is a moth of the Heliozelidae family found in Europe. The larvae mine the twigs of oaks, causing a gall.

== Description ==
The wingspan is 6–8 mm. The head is dark bronzy. The forewings are bronzy-grey with a small indistinct whitish spot on dorsum towards base, and a larger distinct one beyond middle. The hind wings are grey.

Adults are on wing in May and June in one generation per year.

The larvae feed on Quercus petraea, Quercus pubescens, Quercus robur and Quercus suber. Pupation takes place in the soil. The pupa overwinters. Larvae can be found from June to July.

== Distribution ==
It is found in most of Europe, except Spain, Slovenia and most of the Balkan Peninsula.
