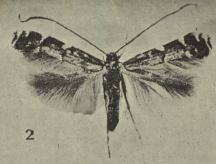

Scientific classification
- Domain: Eukaryota
- Kingdom: Animalia
- Phylum: Arthropoda
- Class: Insecta
- Order: Lepidoptera
- Family: Gracillariidae
- Genus: Corythoxestis
- Species: C. zorionella

Binomial name
- Corythoxestis zorionella (Hudson, 1918)

Synonyms
- Parectopa zorionella Hudson, 1918; Acrocercops zorionella (Hudson, 1918)

= Corythoxestis zorionella =

Karamu leafminer

Species of moth

Corythoxestis zorionella, also known as the karamu leafminer, is a species of moth in the family Gracillariidae. It is endemic to New Zealand.

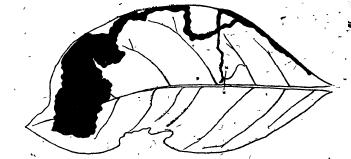
Mine

The larvae feed on Coprosma arborea, Coprosma grandiflora, Coprosma lucida, Coprosma retusa, Coprosma robusta, and Coprosma tenuifolia. They mine the leaves of their host plant. The larva mines directly into the leaf through the bottom of the egg. The mine starts as a long, slender, slightly tortuous, gradually widening gallery. The first part being on the under-surface of the leaf, close against the cuticle, showing up white and silvery by reflected light. The remainder of the mine, however, is on the upper surface. In the last stage the gallery expands, more or less abruptly, into a large irregular blotch. It usually follows the midrib or margin of the leaf along its greater extent, sometimes being deflected by the coarser veins. In this manner its course may be slightly tortuous, but rarely markedly so. The midrib forms an impassable barrier except at its upper end. The colour of the mine is conspicuously white or light green, sometimes discoloured a bright reddish-brown, but patchy in character. That part of the leaf covering the blotch is, in fleshy leaves, more or less mottled in shades of green according to the closeness of the mine to the outer cuticle. The frass is exceedingly scanty, black, finely granular, occupies a thin line near one side of the gallery, sometimes abruptly changing from one side to the other. After the first moult the granules are irregularly scattered over the floor of the mine. Leaves are seldom found containing more than two mines.
