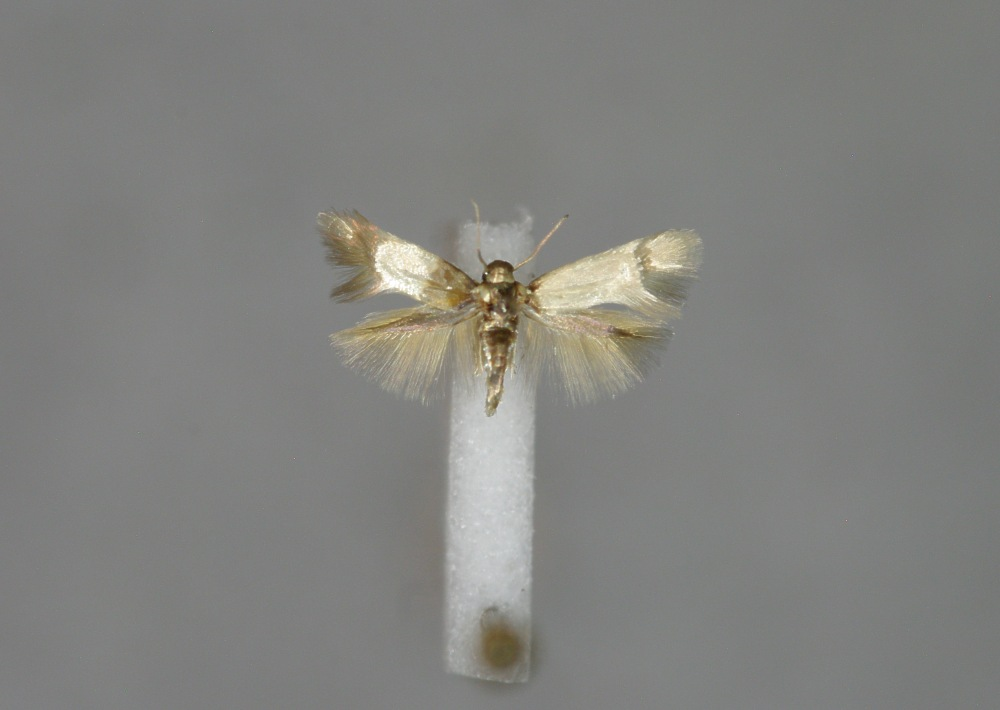

Scientific classification
- Kingdom: Animalia
- Phylum: Arthropoda
- Clade: Pancrustacea
- Class: Insecta
- Order: Lepidoptera
- Family: Heliozelidae
- Genus: Heliozela
- Species: H. lithargyrellum

Binomial name
- Heliozela lithargyrellum (Zeller, 1850)

Synonyms
- Tinagma lithargyrellum Zeller; Heliozela lithargyrella

= Heliozela lithargyrellum =

Species of moth

Heliozela lithargyrellum is a moth of the Heliozelidae family. It is found in France, Italy and on Corsica and Sicily.
