= Corythoxestis aletreuta =

Scientific classification
- Kingdom: Animalia
- Phylum: Arthropoda
- Class: Insecta
- Order: Lepidoptera
- Family: Gracillariidae
- Genus: Corythoxestis
- Species: C. aletreuta

Binomial name
- Corythoxestis aletreuta (Meyrick, 1936)

Synonyms
- Parectopa aletreuta Meyrick, 1936; Cryphiomystis aletreuta; Cryphiomystis chalybophanes (Meyrick, 1937); Acrocercops chalybophanes

Species of moth

Corythoxestis aletreuta is a moth of the family Gracillariidae. It is known from Ethiopia, Nigeria, Rwanda, Tanzania and Uganda.

The larvae feed on Canthium, Coffea arabica, Coffea liberica and Coffea robusta. They probably mine the leaves of their host plant.
