= Heliozela ahenea =

Scientific classification
- Domain: Eukaryota
- Kingdom: Animalia
- Phylum: Arthropoda
- Class: Insecta
- Order: Lepidoptera
- Family: Heliozelidae
- Genus: Heliozela
- Species: H. ahenea

Binomial name
- Heliozela ahenea Walsingham, 1897

Species of moth

Heliozela ahenea is a moth of the family Heliozelidae. It was described by Thomas de Grey, 6th Baron Walsingham, in 1897, and is found in the West Indies.

The wingspan is about 4 mm. The forewings are brassy metallic without markings. The hindwings and cilia are purplish grey.
