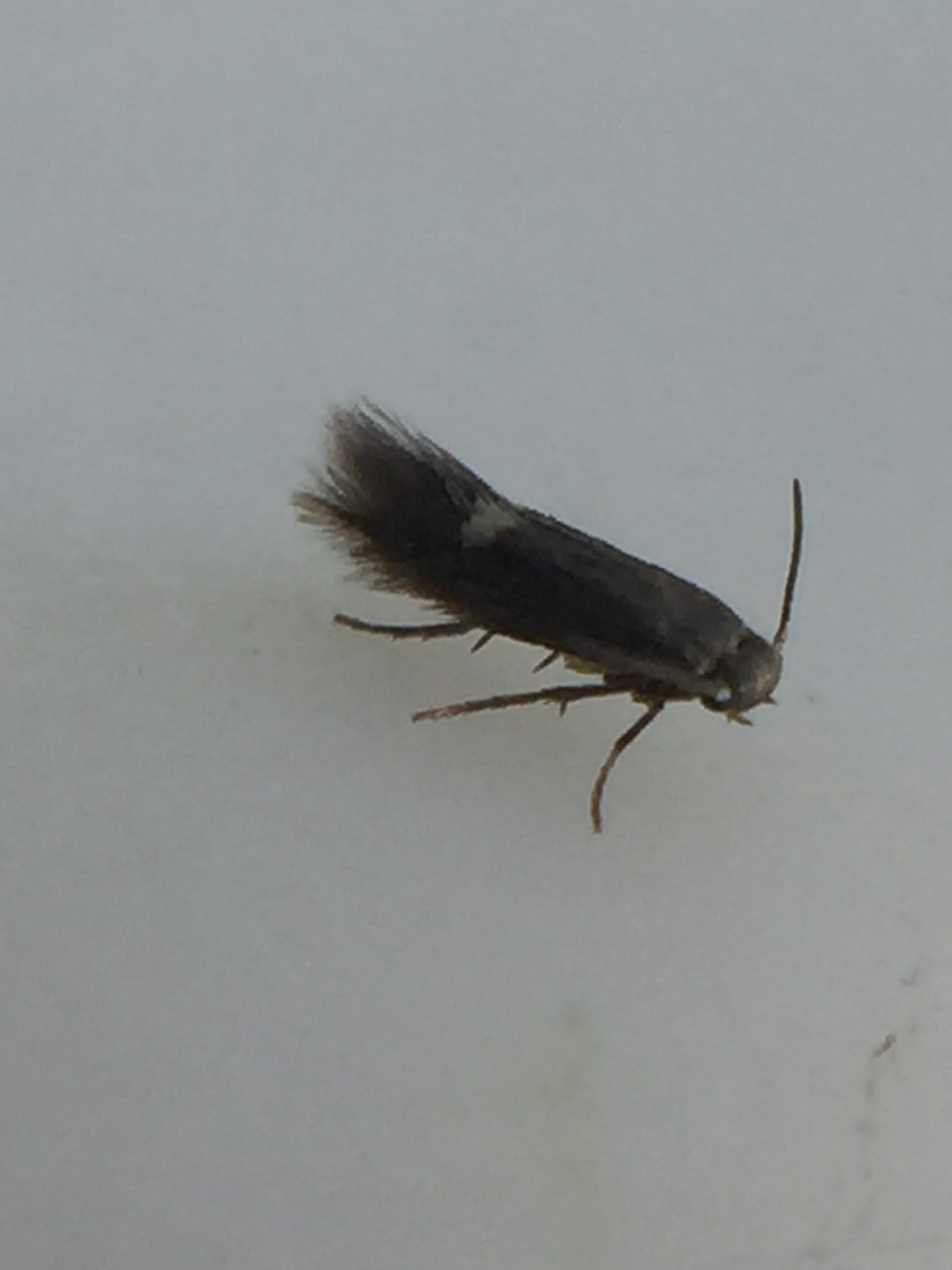
- Heliozela catoptrias in Auckland, New Zealand

Scientific classification
- Kingdom: Animalia
- Phylum: Arthropoda
- Class: Insecta
- Order: Lepidoptera
- Family: Heliozelidae
- Genus: Heliozela
- Species: H. catoptrias

Binomial name
- Heliozela catoptrias Meyrick, 1897

= Heliozela catoptrias =

Species of moth

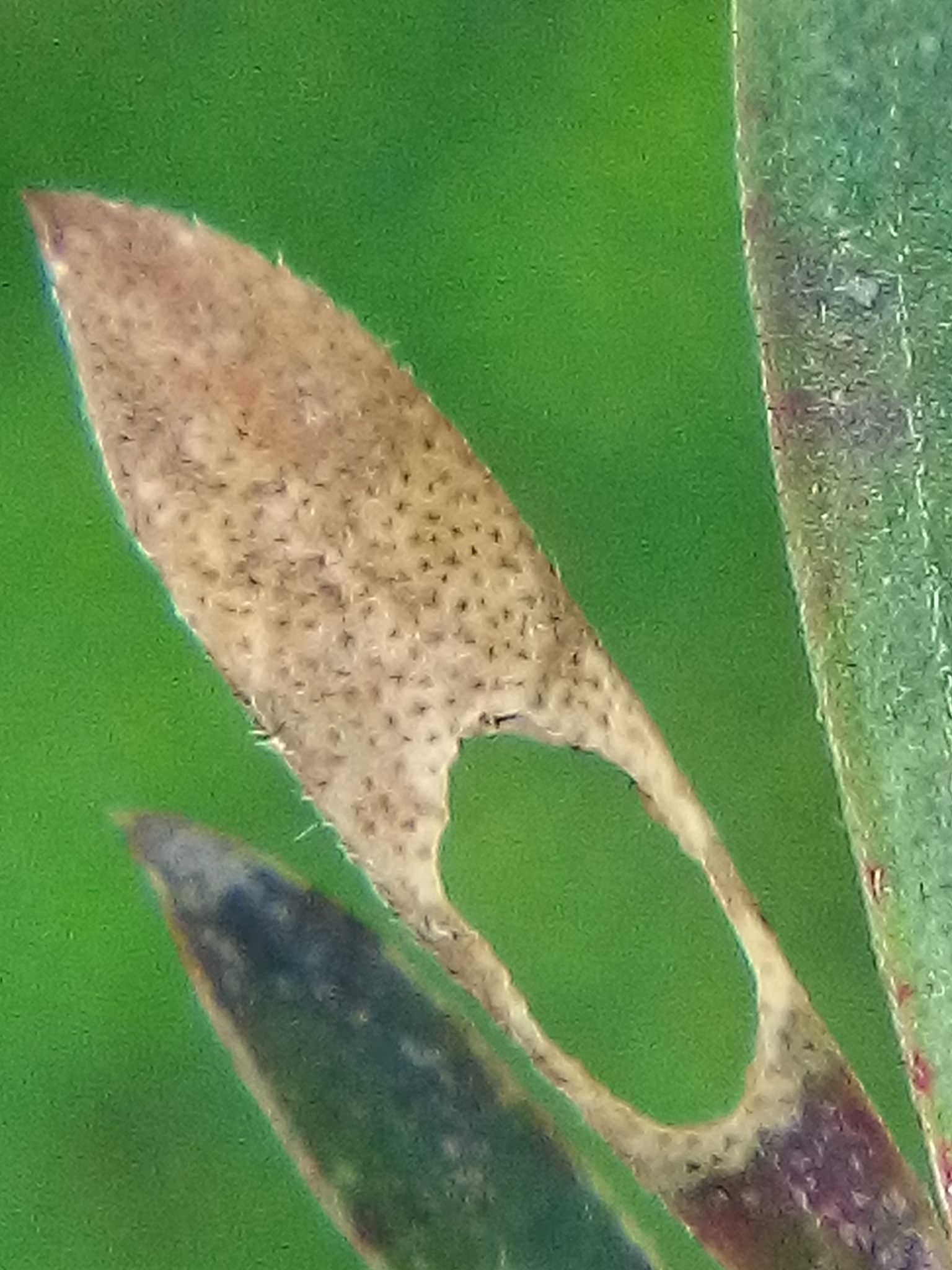
Kanuka leaf mines caused by Heliozela catoptrias

Heliozela catoptrias is a moth of the family Heliozelidae. It was described by Edward Meyrick in 1897. It is found in New South Wales, and is an introduced species in New Zealand.
