= Hoplophanes chalcophaedra =

Scientific classification
- Domain: Eukaryota
- Kingdom: Animalia
- Phylum: Arthropoda
- Class: Insecta
- Order: Lepidoptera
- Family: Heliozelidae
- Genus: Hoplophanes
- Species: H. chalcophaedra

Binomial name
- Hoplophanes chalcophaedra Turner, 1923

Species of moth

Hoplophanes chalcophaedra is a moth of the family Heliozelidae. It was described by Alfred Jefferis Turner in 1923. It is found in New South Wales.
