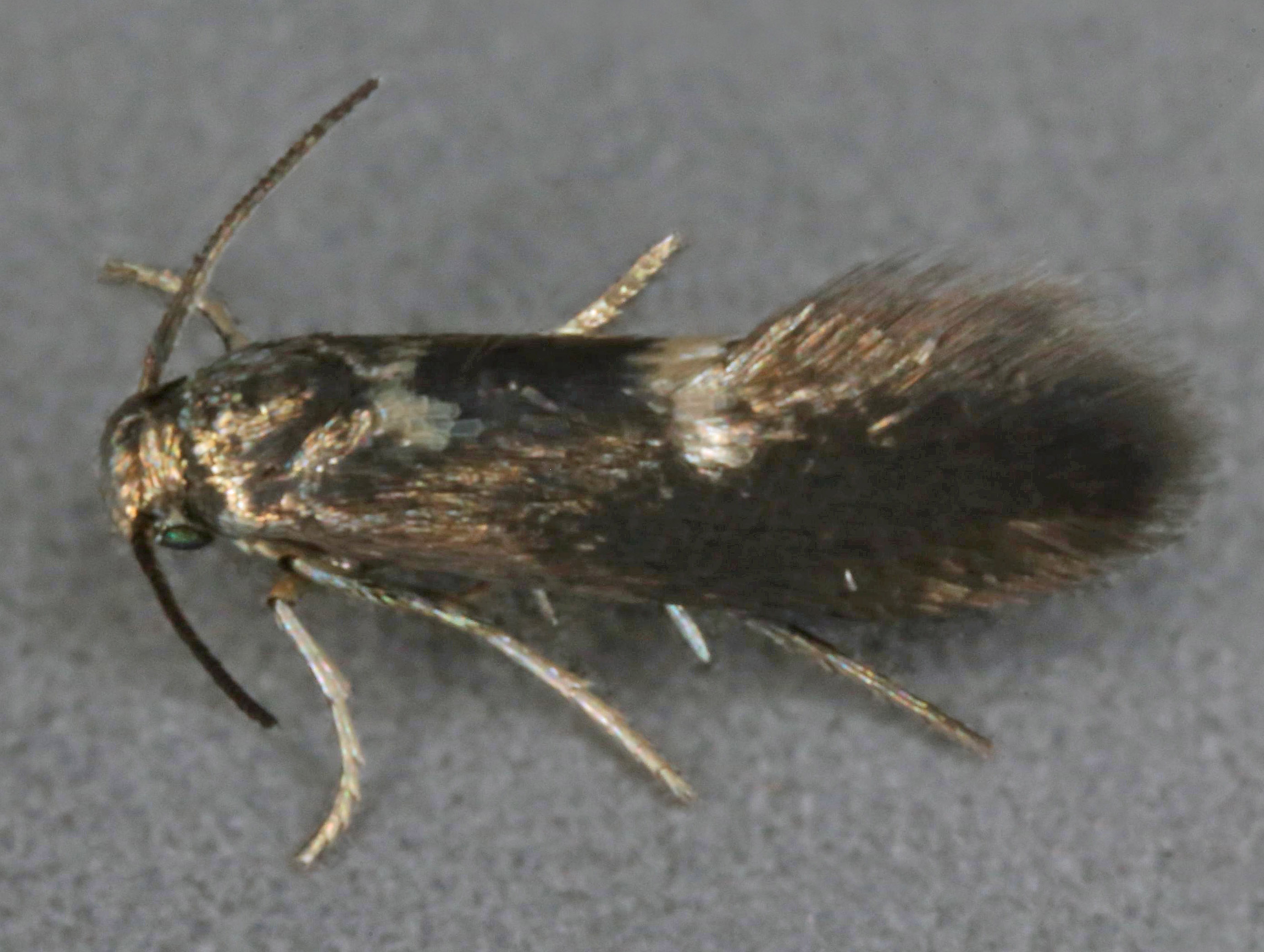
- Heliozela resplendella Fenn's Moss, North Wales,

Scientific classification
- Domain: Eukaryota
- Kingdom: Animalia
- Phylum: Arthropoda
- Class: Insecta
- Order: Lepidoptera
- Family: Heliozelidae
- Genus: Heliozela
- Species: H. resplendella

Binomial name
- Heliozela resplendella (Stainton, 1851)

Synonyms
- Aechmia resplendella Stainton, 1851

= Heliozela resplendella =

Species of moth

Heliozela resplendella is a moth of the Heliozelidae family. It is found from Fennoscandia and northern Russia to the Pyrenees, Alps and Romania and from Ireland to the Baltic region.

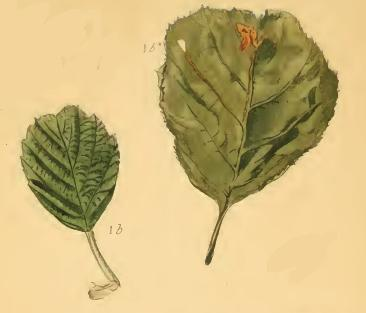
Young alder leaf, showing the early mine of a young larva (1b); developed alder leaf, showing the blotch mine of the adult larva, and another mine whence the oval case has been cut out (1b*)

Larva

The wingspan is 5–7 mm. The head is dark bronzy. The forewings are dark greyish-bronze with a white dorsal spot towards base, and another beyond middle. The hindwings are rather dark brassy grey.

Adults are on wing from late May to July in one generation per year.

The larvae feed on Alnus glutinosa, Alnus glutinosa x incana and Alnus incana. They mine the leaves of their host plant. Larvae can be found from June and July to October. When full-grown, they cut out an oval case, in which they descend to the ground to pupate.
