= Pseliastis trizona =

Scientific classification
- Domain: Eukaryota
- Kingdom: Animalia
- Phylum: Arthropoda
- Class: Insecta
- Order: Lepidoptera
- Family: Heliozelidae
- Genus: Pseliastis
- Species: P. trizona

Binomial name
- Pseliastis trizona Meyrick, 1897

Species of moth

Pseliastis trizona is a species of moth in the family Heliozelidae, described by Edward Meyrick in 1897. It is endemic to Tasmania, Australia.

== Description ==
The head and thorax are bronze in colour and shiny. The legs are a dark bronze, with the posterior tibiae suffused with white. The forewings are a bright, shining golden bronze with several shining white bands. The hindwings and abdomen are dark.
