= Heliozela eucarpa =

Scientific classification
- Kingdom: Animalia
- Phylum: Arthropoda
- Class: Insecta
- Order: Lepidoptera
- Family: Heliozelidae
- Genus: Heliozela
- Species: H. eucarpa

Binomial name
- Heliozela eucarpa Meyrick, 1897

Species of moth

Heliozela eucarpa is a moth of the family Heliozelidae. It was described by Edward Meyrick in 1897. It is found in New South Wales.
