= Heliozela rutilella =

Scientific classification
- Kingdom: Animalia
- Phylum: Arthropoda
- Class: Insecta
- Order: Lepidoptera
- Family: Heliozelidae
- Genus: Heliozela
- Species: H. rutilella

Binomial name
- Heliozela rutilella (Walker, 1864)

Synonyms
- Gelechia rutilella Walker, 1864

Species of moth

Heliozela rutilella is a moth of the family Heliozelidae. It was described by Francis Walker in 1864. It is found in New South Wales.
