= Hoplophanes acrozona =

Scientific classification
- Kingdom: Animalia
- Phylum: Arthropoda
- Class: Insecta
- Order: Lepidoptera
- Family: Heliozelidae
- Genus: Hoplophanes
- Species: H. acrozona

Binomial name
- Hoplophanes acrozona Meyrick, 1897

Species of moth

Hoplophanes acrozona is a moth of the family Heliozelidae. It was described by Edward Meyrick in 1897. It is found in Western Australia.
