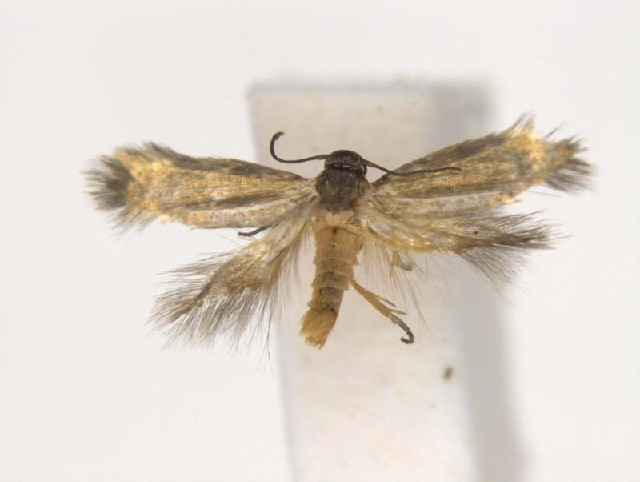
- Adult male specimen of P. xanthodisca

Scientific classification
- Domain: Eukaryota
- Kingdom: Animalia
- Phylum: Arthropoda
- Class: Insecta
- Order: Lepidoptera
- Family: Heliozelidae
- Genus: Pseliastis
- Species: P. xanthodisca

Binomial name
- Pseliastis xanthodisca Meyrick, 1897

= Pseliastis xanthodisca =

Species of moth

Pseliastis xanthodisca is a species of moth in the family Heliozelidae, described by Edward Meyrick in 1897. It is endemic to Tasmania, Australia.

== Description ==
The head, antennae, and thorax of the adult moth are bronze in colour and shiny. The legs are a shining dark grey, with the posterior tibiae yellowish. The forewings are a bright, shining bronze and lack any markings. The hindwings are a shiny grey, marked with a ochreous-yellow patch in males and tinged with yellow in females. The abdomen is orange with a series of dark dots in males, while in females the abdomen is a dark bronze colour.
