= Hoplophanes lithocolleta =

Scientific classification
- Domain: Eukaryota
- Kingdom: Animalia
- Phylum: Arthropoda
- Class: Insecta
- Order: Lepidoptera
- Family: Heliozelidae
- Genus: Hoplophanes
- Species: H. lithocolleta

Binomial name
- Hoplophanes lithocolleta Turner, 1916

Species of moth

Hoplophanes lithocolleta is a moth of the family Heliozelidae endemic to New South Wales. It was described by Turner in 1916.
