= Hoplophanes chalcopetala =

Scientific classification
- Kingdom: Animalia
- Phylum: Arthropoda
- Class: Insecta
- Order: Lepidoptera
- Family: Heliozelidae
- Genus: Hoplophanes
- Species: H. chalcopetala

Binomial name
- Hoplophanes chalcopetala (Meyrick, 1897)

Synonyms
- Prophylactis chalcopetala Meyrick, 1897

Species of moth

Hoplophanes chalcopetala is a moth of the genus Hoplophanes, in the family Heliozelidae. It was described by Edward Meyrick in 1897. It is found in New South Wales.
