= Heliozela crypsimetalla =

Scientific classification
- Kingdom: Animalia
- Phylum: Arthropoda
- Class: Insecta
- Order: Lepidoptera
- Family: Heliozelidae
- Genus: Heliozela
- Species: H. crypsimetalla

Binomial name
- Heliozela crypsimetalla Meyrick, 1897

Species of moth

Heliozela crypsimetalla is a moth of the Heliozelidae family. It was described by Edward Meyrick in 1897. It is found in South Australia.
