= Corythoxestis praeustella =

Scientific classification
- Kingdom: Animalia
- Phylum: Arthropoda
- Class: Insecta
- Order: Lepidoptera
- Family: Gracillariidae
- Genus: Corythoxestis
- Species: C. praeustella

Binomial name
- Corythoxestis praeustella (van Deventer, 1904)

Synonyms
- Heliozela praeustella Deventer, 1904

Species of moth

Corythoxestis praeustella is a moth of the family Gracillariidae. It is known from Java, Indonesia. The hostplants for the species include Nauclea orientalis.
